= List of churches preserved by the Churches Conservation Trust in the East of England =

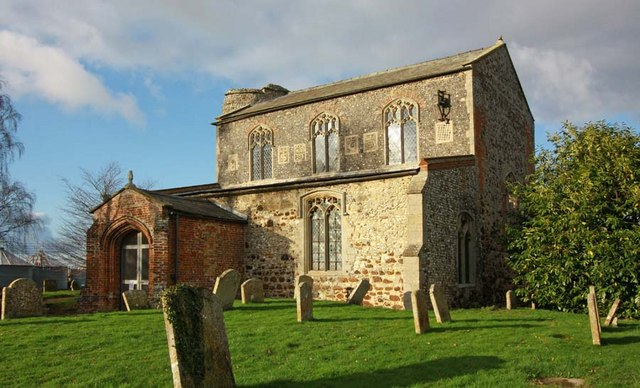
The truncated St Nicholas' Church, Feltwell in Norfolk contains fabric from the Saxon era

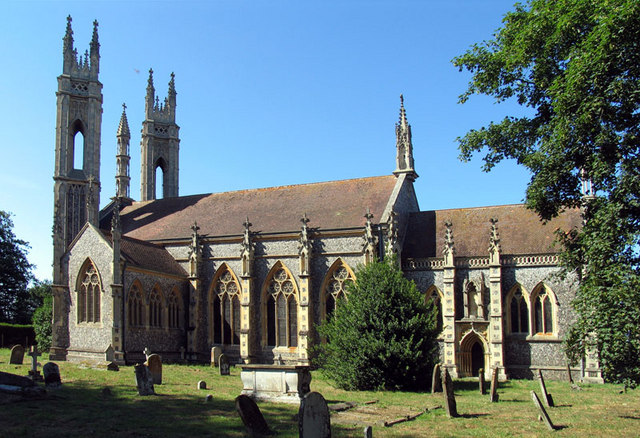
St Michael the Archangel's Church, Booton, Norfolk is the newest church preserved by the Churches Conservation Trust in the East of England

The Churches Conservation Trust, which was initially known as the Redundant Churches Fund, is a charity whose purpose is to protect historic churches at risk, those that have been made redundant by the Church of England. The Trust was established by the Pastoral Measure of 1968. The legally defined object of the Trust is "the preservation, in the interests of the nation and the Church of England, of churches and parts of churches of historic and archaeological interest or architectural quality vested in the Fund ... together with their contents so vested". The charity cares for over 350 churches. The Trust is financed partly by the Department for Culture, Media and Sport and the Church Commissioners, but grants from those bodies were frozen in 2001, since when additional funding has come from other sources, including the general public. In the 12 months ending 31 March 2010 the charity's income was £6,161,653, and its spending was £6,035,871. During that year it had 44 employees, and used the services of 2,000 volunteers. The charity is run by a board of trustees, who delegate the day-to-day management to a chief executive and his senior management team.

The Trust's primary aim is to ensure that the buildings in its care are weatherproof and to prevent any deterioration in their condition. The majority of the churches remain consecrated, and many are occasionally still used for worship. Local communities are encouraged to use them for appropriate activities and events, and the buildings provide an educational resource, allowing children and young people to study history and architecture. Nearly 2 million people visit the Trust's churches each year.

There are 104 churches preserved by the Churches Conservation Trust in the East of England, comprising those in the counties of Bedfordshire, Cambridgeshire, Essex, Hertfordshire, Lincolnshire, Norfolk, and Suffolk. The churches range in age from St Nicholas' Church, Feltwell, which contains fabric from the Saxon era, to the newest church, St Michael the Archangel's Church, Booton, which was built in the later part of the 19th century. All but twelve of the churches were built before the end of the 15th century, so the main architectural styles represented are Norman and English Gothic. There is one church in Georgian style (Old All Saints Church, Great Steeping) and one in Palladian style (St Andrew's Church, Gunton). The newest six churches are Gothic Revival in style. All the churches have been designated by English Heritage as listed buildings, almost all of them at Grades I and II*.

Some of the churches stand in or near the centres of cities or towns, and their functions have been taken over by nearby churches: examples include St Martin's Church, Colchester, St John the Baptist's Church, Stamford, St Peter's Church, Sudbury, St Mary at the Quay Church, Ipswich, three churches in Norwich, and two in Cambridge. The Church of St Cyriac and St Julitta, Swaffham Prior is so close to the Church of St Mary that the churches share the same churchyard; the functions of both are now undertaken by St Mary's. Other churches stand in remote or isolated positions in the countryside. Some fell into disuse because the village they served was deserted, or the local population moved elsewhere, such as St Peter's Church, Kingerby, St Andrew's Church, Sapiston, St Denys' Church, Little Barford, and St Mary's Church, Chilton. In other cases the church originally served the estate of a country house but no longer does: examples include St Lawrence's Church, Snarford, Oxhey Chapel, and St Andrew's Church, Gunton. In some cases, only part of the church has been conserved, as with St Mary, West Walton, where the detached tower is conserved but its church continues in use. All Saints Church, Newton Green has been divided at the chancel, which continues to be used for worship although the rest of the church is maintained by the Trust. Only the Audley chapel of St Michael's Church, Berechurch has been conserved; the rest of it was converted for other uses. Most of the churches remain consecrated and hold occasional services if practical, and some are used for other purposes such as concert venues.

== Key ==
Explanation of the three listed building grades
| Grade | Criteria |
|---|---|
| I | Buildings of exceptional interest, sometimes considered to be internationally important |
| II* | Particularly important buildings of more than special interest |
| II | Buildings of national importance and special interest |

== Churches ==
List of the churches, locations, year of construction and listed building grade
| Name and town or village | County and coordinates | Photograph | Date^{[A]} | Notes | Grade |
|---|---|---|---|---|---|
| St Nicholas, Feltwell | Norfolk; 52.4891°N 0.5209°E | A stone church with a brick porch seen from the south. To the left are the remains of the collapsed tower. The clerestory contains three windows and six carved panels. | c. 683 | The remains of the tower and the west wall of the church date from the Saxon era. Most of the rest of the church is Perpendicular, and its walls are decorated with flushwork panels. It has two aisles but no chancel, making it broader than it is long. | I |
| St Martin, Waithe | Lincolnshire; 53.4874°N 0.0666°W | A stone church seen from the south, with a central tower in front of which is a two-storey gabled porch. To the left is a short nave, and to the right an apsidal chancel | 10th century | The central tower of the church is Saxon, dating from the 10th century. Additions and alterations were made in the 11th and 13th centuries, and the church was restored in 1861 in Early English style. | I |
| St Mary, Chickney | Essex; 51.9287°N 0.2882°E | A stone church with red tiled roofs seen from the southeast, showing the chancel, the nave at a higher level, and at the far end the tower with a pyramidal roof | 10th–11th century | St Mary's dates from before the Norman conquest. The chancel was extended in the 13th century, the tower was added in the 14th century, and the south porch in the 15th century. | I |
| St Mary (old), West Bergholt | Essex; 51.9171°N 0.8384°E | A stone church with red tiled roofs seen from the south, showing the chancel, the south aisle and porch, and the tower with a pyramidal roof | c. 1000 | The north wall of the church dates from about 1000, the chancel was extended in about 1300, and later in that century the south aisle was added. Another church, also dedicated to St Mary, was opened in 1904, and the older church was declared redundant in 1975. | I |
| St Peter, Kingerby | Lincolnshire; 53.4219°N 0.4104°W | A stone church with red tiled roofs seen from the southeast, showing the chancel, the south aisle, clerestory and porch, and the tower plain parapet | Early 11th century | This church originally served a village that is now deserted. Its earliest fabric dates from the early 11th century. Additions and alterations were made in each of the following three centuries and in the 17th century. | I |
| St Peter, Claydon | Suffolk; 52.1056°N 1.1195°E | A stone church seen from the southwest. Nearest is the tower with a battlemented parapet bearing statues, then a short nave, and a larger south transept | 11th century | The nave dates from the 11th century, the east window from the 14th century, and the tower was added in the 15th century. In 1852 a major restoration took place under the direction of the rector, when the chancel was virtually rebuilt, and transepts and organ chambers were added. | I |
| St Mary the Virgin, Little Hormead | Hertfordshire; 51.9429°N 0.0332°E | A small stone church with red tiled roofs seen through a churchyard from the southeast. On its far gable is a bellcote with a pyramidal roof | 11th century | Much of this church is Norman in style. Preserved in the church is a rare door that has a "most lavish display of 12th-century ironwork". The church was vested in the Churches Conservation Trust in 1995. | I |
| St Nicholas, Normanton | Lincolnshire; 53.0052°N 0.5874°W | A stone church seen from the southeast. The chancel has a red tiled roof, the larger nave with clerestory has a battlemented parapet, and the tower has a plain parapet | 11th century | The church dates from the 11th century, with additions and alterations made during each of the following four centuries. In 1845 the vestry was added, and the chancel and the north wall of the nave were largely rebuilt. The church was declared redundant in February 1974. | II* |
| St Mary, North Cockerington | Lincolnshire; 53.4011°N 0.0556°E | A stone church seen from the southeast, with a small chancel, a larger nave and south aisle under one roof beyond, and a short, rendered tower with pinnacles | 11th century | St Mary's stands a mile from its former parish. It dates from the 11th century, with additions and alterations in the late 12th century, in about 1300, and in the 14th century. The tower was added in the 19th century, and the church was declared redundant in March 1981. | I |
| All Saints, Wordwell | Suffolk; 52.3160°N 0.6805°E | A flint church with red tiled roofs seen from the southeast; a double bellcote is at the far end | 11th century | The lancet windows in the church were replaced in the 14th and 15th centuries, and a porch was added in about 1500. A restoration was carried out between 1857 and 1866 by S. S. Teulon. | I |
| St Mary, Barnetby | Lincolnshire; 53.5676°N 0.3986°W | A stone church seen from the south; from the left is a broad squat plain tower, then a nave with a slate roof and two windows, and at the right a small chancel with a red tiled roof | Late 11th century | St Mary's dates from the 11th century, the tower was built in the 11th–12th century, and additions and alterations were made in the 13th, 17th, and 18th centuries. The church was declared redundant in 1972. | I |
| All Saints, Icklingham | Suffolk; 52.3228°N 0.6042°E | A large tower to the left in three stages with a plain parapet and the much smaller body of the church to the right | 11th–12th century | Although the church was almost completely rebuilt in the 14th century, it has retained some Norman fabric in the nave. A south porch was added in the 15th century. The church has been unused for over 100 years, and was declared redundant in the 1970s, since when its roof has been re-thatched. | I |
| St Mary, Stansted Mountfitchet | Essex; 51.8953°N 0.2092°E | A brick tower with a battlemented parapet and a spirelet seen between trees | 1120–24 | Despite alterations, the church retains some original features. In the 13th century the chancel was extended and a chapel was added. The tower was built in 1692. The church was restored in 1888, but the following year another church was built nearer the centre of the village, and it is now the parish church. St Mary's remains consecrated and is used for occasional services and other events. | II* |
| St Michael, Burwell | Lincolnshire; 53.2969°N 0.0327°E | A stone church seen from the northwest. In the foreground is a battlemented tower with a west door and clock with the nave and chancel beyond. | Early 12th century | St Michael's dates from the early 12th century. The chancel was added during the following century, and the tower was built in the early 16th century. There were alterations in the 18th and 19th centuries. The church was restored in 1911, but declared redundant in 1981. | I |
| St Margaret of Antioch, Knotting | Knotting; 52.2603°N 0.5324°W | A stone church with tower and unclerestoried nave and chancel beyond. | Early 12th century | Built as a chapel for a nearby manor, the church dates from the early 12th century. A west tower, a nave, a chancel and a south transept are constructed of limestone rubble with a clay-tiled roof. Inside are lockable gates leading to the chancel added after the church was used for cockfighting in 1637. Vested into the CCT in 2009. | I |
| St Martin, Colchester | Essex; 51.8909°N 0.8994°E | A stone tower with a sloping top, standing in a churchyard | Early 12th century | The nave and tower date from the 12th century, and much of the rest of the church was added in the 14th century. The tower was damaged during the Civil War, and has never been repaired. The church was restored in the late 19th century by Giles Gilbert Scott. | II* |
| St Benedict, Haltham on Bain | Lincolnshire; 53.1571°N 0.1379°W | A stone church with a slate roof seen from the southwest, showing the weatherboarded bellcote and the gabled south porch | Early 12th century | Dating from the 12th century, additions and alterations were made later that century, and in each of the following three centuries. It was restored in 1880 and in 1891, increasing its seating from 67 to 140. The church was declared redundant in October 1977. | I |
| St Mary the Virgin, Little Bromley | Essex; 51.9097°N 1.0397°E | A church seen from the southwest. The body of the church and the lower part of the tower are in stone, the upper part of the tower is red brick, the south porch is timber-framed, and the roof is covered in red tiles | Early 12th century | The nave dates from the early 12th century, the chancel was rebuilt in the 14th century, the lower part of the tower dates from the early 15th century, and the upper part was rebuilt in the 16th century. The church was restored in the 19th and 20th centuries. | II* |
| St Nicholas, Brandiston | Norfolk; 52.7480°N 1.1712°E | A flint church seen from the southwest. From the left are a round tower with an octagonal top, the west gable, the south porch, and the south wall of the nave with large windows | 12th century | The lower part of the tower dates from the 12th century, but its octagonal upper stage was not added until the 19th century. The present north aisle was originally the nave. A chancel was added in the 15th century. The windows in the south wall of the nave contain some medieval stained glass. | II* |
| St Barbara, Haceby | Lincolnshire; 52.9122°N 0.4694°W | A stone church seen from the southeast, showing the chancel, beyond which is the nave with a clerestory, a south aisle and a porch, beyond which is a tower with a plain parapet | 12th century | This limestone church dates from the 12th century, with later additions and alterations. It was restored in 1890 and in 1924. Above its chancel arch are Royal arms painted over a medieval Doom picture. | I |
| St Margaret, Hales | Norfolk; 52.5106°N 1.5111°E | A stone church with thatched roofs seen from the north; on the left is a chancel with an apse, in the middle is the nave containing a Norman doorway, and on the right is a round tower | 12th century | St Margaret's has a round tower, a semicircular apse, two fine Norman doorways, and a thatched roof. Other than the addition of windows, it has been little changed since it was built in the 12th century. There are traces of paintings on the walls of the nave. | I |
| St Gregory, Heckingham | Norfolk; 52.5352°N 1.5144°E | A flint church seen from the southeast, with thatched roofs, an apsidal chancel, a slightly taller nave beyond it, and a tower with an octagonal top | 12th century | Most of the fabric of this church dates from the 12th and 13th centuries. The lower part of the tower is round, and the upper two stages are octagonal. The church also has a fine Norman doorway, and an apsidal east end. | I |
| St John the Baptist, Hellington | Norfolk; 52.5761°N 1.4128°E | A stone church seen from the southeast, showing the chancel and nave with Decorated windows, the south porch carried on open arches, and the round, battlemented tower | 12th century | The round tower dates from the 12th century as does much of the rest of the church's fabric; the remainder is 14th-century. The church has a "very elaborate" Norman south doorway. | I |
| St Faith, Little Witchingham | Norfolk; 52.7383°N 1.1323°E | A small flint church seen between trees from the southeast, with a battlemented tower at the far end | 12th century | The church originated in the 12th century, but most of its fabric is from the 14th century; the tower was added in the 15th century. The church fell into ruin during the 20th century before its medieval wall paintings were rediscovered. | II* |
| St Mary, Moulton | Norfolk; 52.6046°N 1.5464°E | A mainly stone church with a round tower on the left, to the right is a nave with a porch, and a chancel at a lower level | 12th century | The fabric of this church dates from the 12th, 14th, and 16th centuries. The east wall of the chancel was rebuilt in the 1870s. On the walls of the nave are 14th-century wall paintings depicting Saint Christopher and the Seven Acts of Mercy. | I |
| St Peter, Normanby by Spital | Lincolnshire; 53.3804°N 0.4964°W | A stone church seen from the south with, on the left, an embattled tower with pinnacles, and to the right a nave with clerestorey, aisle, and pointed doorway | 12th century | St Peter's dates from the 12th century, with additions and alterations in each of the following three centuries. It was restored in 1890. Its north arcade is Norman, with round arches, and its south arcade has pointed arches. | I |
| St Peter, Offord D'Arcy | Cambridgeshire; 52.2824°N 0.2178°W | A stone church seen from the southeast, showing chancel, beyond which is a taller nave with a south aisle, and a tower with a spire | 12th century | The church has Norman origins, its chancel was rebuilt in the 13th century, and the south aisle, tower and spire were added in the 14th century. The spire was rebuilt in 1860. By the time the church was declared redundant its roof was leaking. The church has since been repaired and is used for a variety of events. | I |
| All Saints, Saltfleetby | Lincolnshire; 53.3906°N 0.1867°E | A stone church seen from the south, with a slightly leaning west tower on the left, a long south aisle to the right, and a porch | 12th century | All Saints stands in marshland and has a leaning west tower. One of the two pulpits inside the church was donated by Oriel College, Oxford. The church dates from the 12th century, and many later additions and alterations have been made. It was declared redundant in 1973. | I |
| St Andrew, Sapiston | Suffolk; 52.3328°N 0.8172°E | A stone church with red-tiled roofs seen from the south; on the left is an embattled tower, and to the right is the nave with a south porch, and a lower chancel | 12th century | This church originally served what is now a deserted medieval village. It has a Norman south doorway. The rest of the church dates from the 14th century, and it was restored in 1847. The church was declared redundant in 1973. | I |
| St George, Shimpling | Norfolk; 52.3993°N 1.1680°E | A flint church seen from the southwest, having a tall round tower with an octagonal bell stage and a lead spirelet. The body of the church stretches to the right. | 12th century | St George's dates from the 12th century, with later additions and alterations, and two restorations in the 19th century. The lower part of its tower is round and the upper stage is octagonal, surmounted by a lead-covered spirelet. | I |
| St Lawrence, Snarford | Lincolnshire; 53.3284°N 0.4240°W | A small stone church seen from the southeast; at the far end is a short tower with a hipped roof | 12th century | The church was built to serve the residents of the nearby Snarford Hall (now demolished), including the St Paul (or St Pol) family. It contains elaborate monuments to this family, and an alabaster plaque to Robert Rich. The church was declared redundant in 1995. | I |
| All Saints, South Elmham | Suffolk; 52.3937°N 1.4226°E | A flint church seen from the southeast; on the left is a round tower with a battlemented parapet, and the body of the church, with a porch and a small clerestory, extends to the right | 12th century | The tower is round and contains a Norman west window. The rest of the church dates from between the 13th and the 17th centuries. It was restored in 1870, when a Romanesque Revival south doorway was inserted. | I |
| St John the Baptist, Stamford | Lincolnshire; 52.6518°N 0.4800°W | The tower and part of the body of a Perpendicular style church | 12th century | Built in the 12th century, the church was expanded during a time of prosperity in the town in the early 15th century. It was restored in the High church tradition in 1856. Repairs had to be undertaken in 1950–53 because of subsidence resulting from the collapse of burial vaults under the church. | I |
| St James, Stanstead Abbotts | Hertfordshire; 51.7807°N 0.0276°E | A flint tower with a battlemented parapet and a small spire; to the right is a stair turret rising higher than the tower | 12th century | This medieval church has maintained its unrestored 18th-century interior. It contains an elaborate monument to Sir Edward Baesh, who died in 1587. In the churchyard are six Grade II monuments and a tomb. | I |
| St Andrew, Steeple Gidding | Cambridgeshire; 52.4185°N 0.3369°W | A stone church seen from the southwest with, from the left, a tower with a steeple, the nave with clerestory and porch, and to the right the chancel | 12th century | The oldest part of the church is the Norman south doorway, but the remainder dates from the 14th century. The body of the church was restored in 1874 and the tower in 1899. | II* |
| All Saints, Theddlethorpe | Lincolnshire; 53.3705°N 0.1985°E | A stone church seen from the south, with a battlemented tower on the left, and a nave with clerestorey and porch to the right | 12th century | Sometimes known as the "Cathedral of the Marsh", All Saints dates from the 12th century, with additions and alterations in about 1380–1400, and again in the late 17th century. It was declared redundant in 1973. | I |
| All Saints, Vange, Basildon | Essex; 51.5533°N 0.47236°E | A small stone church with a red tiled roof and a wooden bellcote | 12th century | This small, simple church dates from the 12th century. It contains the remains of a Norman window, and a 12th-century font. | II* |
| St Mary, Washbrook | Suffolk; 52.0415°N 1.0746°E | A mainly stone church seen from the south showing a tower with a battlemented brick parapet, a porch, and a roof with red and black tiles in bands | 12th century | St Mary's stands in an isolated position in fields. Most of its fabric dates from the 14th century, but it was restored in 1866. | II* |
| St Andrew, Willingale | Essex; 51.7418°N 0.3106°E | A flint church with red tiled roofs and a white wooden spire | 12th century | The nave dates from the 12th century, and the chancel from the 15th century. In the 19th century the church was restored and a vestry added. It is built mainly in flint, with a red tiled roof. At its west end is a white weatherboarded belfry and spire. | II* |
| St John, Duxford | Cambridgeshire; 52.0944°N 0.1563°E | A stone church seen from the south, with a central battlemented tower, the nave with a porch and red tiled roof to the left, and a smaller chancel with a flat copper roof to the right | Late 12th century | The Norman south door is decorated with a zigzag pattern. The central tower of the church bears a twisted spirelet damaged in a gale. Inside the church is a variety of wall decorations, including medieval wall paintings. | I |
| St Michael, Farndish | Bedfordshire; 52.2638°N 0.6418°W | A plain stone church seen from the southwest; the west tower has a plain parapet and is incorporated into the body of the church; the south wall of the church has two windows with a doorway between | Late 12th century | St Michael's is built with a mixture of orange ironstone and grey limestone, giving a polychrome effect. Its tower is incorporated within the west bay of the nave. | I |
| St Denys, Little Barford | Bedfordshire; 52.1982°N 0.2785°W | A field with a stone church in the distance, showing an embattled tower on the left, then the nave with a slate roof, and at a lower level the chancel with a red tiled roof | Late 12th century | This church originally served what is now a deserted medieval village. It was restored in 1869 by Arthur Blomfield. The ceiling paintings by Heaton and Butler and the mosaic reredos by William Butler Simpson date from around this time. | II* |
| St Mary, Badley | Suffolk; 52.1630°N 1.0140°E | A stone church seen from the south with red tiled roofs and a plain tower on the left | c. 1200 | The arrangement of pews and benches in the church has been undisturbed since the 18th century. Also in the church are monuments and memorials, including 17 memorial floor slabs, mainly to the Poley family. | I |
| St George, Edworth | Bedfordshire; 52.0510°N 0.2190°W | | c. 1200 | In the Middle Ages the church belonged to St Neots Priory. It contains an unusual piscina standing on a pillar. Also in the church is a fragment of a 14th-century wall painting, and some medieval stained glass. | I |
| St Peter, South Somercotes | Lincolnshire; 53.4221°N 0.1293°E | A stone church seen from the south with, from the left, a tower with a tall spire, the nave with a protruding aisle and a porch, and a shorter chancel | c. 1200 | With its tall spire rising from a flat landscape, this church has been called "The Queen of the Marsh". Since it was declared redundant it has been underpinned because of subsidence. | I |
| St Nicholas, King's Lynn | Norfolk; 52.7575°N 0.3970°E | The west end of a church; on the right is a tower with a tall slim tower, in the middle the nave with a large west window, and on the left a lower aisle, also with a large window | c. 1220 | The steeple collapsed in 1741 and was rebuilt in 1869 by George Gilbert Scott. It contains a rare surviving example of a consistory court. Among its memorials is one designed by Robert Adam to Benjamin Keene. | I |
| St Michael, Longstanton | Cambridgeshire; 52.2730°N 0.0548°E | The west end of a stone church seen from a slight angle, showing two large buttresses with a window between, a double bellcote above, and part of the body of the church with its thatched roof | Early 13th century | The design of this thatched church was influential in the design of churches in the American Gothic Revival. Its contents include a double piscina said to be similar to that in Jesus College Chapel, Cambridge. | II* |
| St Botolph, Skidbrooke | Lincolnshire; 53.4162°N 0.1651°E | A stone and brick church seen from the southeast showing, from the far end, a battlemented tower, a nave with clerestory, aisle and porch, and a smaller chancel | Early 13th century | Standing in the Lincolnshire marshlands, additions and alterations have been carried out since the church was built in the 13th century. It was declared redundant in 1973, and there have been reports of satanist activity in the church. | I |
| Bell tower of St Mary, West Walton | Norfolk; 52.69759°N 0.175781°E | A tower with an open lower stage, and arches in the stages above and on the buttresses; at the top is a decorated parapet and crocketted pinnacles | c. 1240–50 | This tower is detached from its church, which is still active and is separately listed at Grade I. The bottom stage of the tower is open on all sides to provide walkways. Above this are three more stages, all decorated with arches. | I |
| St Nicholas, Buckenham | Norfolk; 52.5996°N 1.4771°E | A stone church with a red tiled roof seen from the southeast with an octagonal west tower | 13th century | The tower of this church is wholly octagonal and it has a Norman west doorway. Inside its upper part is a 17th-century dovecote lined with brick nesting boxes. The church was vandalised in the 1960s and 1970s, and has since been repaired by the Trust. | I |
| St Michael, Buslingthorpe | Lincolnshire; 53.3523°N 0.3797°W | A simple stone church showing a stubby tower with pyramidal roof and lancet windows and beyond that, the nave with a single window | 13th century | St Michael's is a simple church standing on the site of a deserted medieval village. Its limestone tower dates from the 13th century, while the rest of the church was rebuilt in brick in 1835. It is notable for two medieval monuments to members of the Buslingthorpe family. The church was declared redundant in 1984. | II* |
| All Hallows, Clixby | Lincolnshire; 53.5242°N 0.3385°W | A small, very plain stone church seen from an angle, consisting of a single cell with a porch at the west end, a bellcote at the far end, and no visible windows | 13th century | Since being built in the 13th century the fabric of this church deteriorated so much that by 1871 only the chancel had survived. This was restored in 1889 by C. Hodgson Fowler and a west porch was added. The church was declared redundant in 1973. | II* |
| St Michael, Coston | Norfolk; 52.6145°N 1.0447°E | A church in stone, partly rendered, seen from the southeast, showing the battlemented tower, the south porch, and the nave and chancel, both with lancet windows | 13th century | St Michael's is a church in Early English style dating mainly from the 13th century. A battlemented parapet was added to the tower in the 15th century, the south porch was built in the 16th century, and the east wall was rebuilt at a later date. | II* |
| All Saints, Little Wenham | Suffolk; 52.0119°N 1.0309°E | A church seen from the southwest; prominent is the west tower, its lower two stages in flint and the battlemented top stage in red brick; beyond it stretches the body of the church with its south porch | 13th century | All Saints stands in an isolated position close to Little Wenham Hall. Inside the church are paintings of saints on the east wall, an elaborate memorial to Joannes Brewse, who died in 1585, and a medieval brass to the memory of Thomas Brewse, who died in 1514, and his wife. The brass is said to be one of the best pre-Reformation brasses in Suffolk. | I |
| St John the Baptist, Stanton | Suffolk; 52.3268°N 0.8779°E | A flint church seen between trees, the body ruined and roofless, the tower with a battlemented parapet | 13th century | Only the tower of this church is still intact, its body being roofless. The west wall of the tower is built against the boundary of the churchyard, and its lowest stage is open to allow a way for processions around the outside of the church. | II* |
| St Mary the Virgin, Wiggenhall | Norfolk; 52.7042°N 0.3409°E | A stone church with red tiled roofs seen from the southeast, showing a battlemented tower, a nave with a clerestory, a south porch and a chancel | 13th century | The doorways date from the 13th century and the rest of the church from about 1400. It was restored in 1862 by G. E. Street. Its interior is notable particularly for the quality of carving of its wooden fittings, especially the elaborate font cover, and the benches. Also in the church is a monument to Sir Henry Kervil who died in 1624. This consists of an alabaster tomb chest with two effigies surrounded by columns and an entablature. | I |
| St Mary, Akenham | Suffolk; 52.0962°N 1.1344°E | A church seen from the south with a flint battlemented tower on the left, a brick chapel in the middle, and a rendered chancel to the right | Late 13th century | St Mary's is built mainly in flint with limestone dressings, the wall of the chancel is rendered, and the chapel is in brick. There is a Norman slit window in the north wall of the nave. During recent repairs a piscina was discovered in the chapel and a blocked north doorway in the nave. | II* |
| St Mary, Islington | Norfolk; 52.7268°N 0.3247°E | The ruins of a church from the southeast showing from the left a battlemented tower, the gable end of the roofless south transept, and the roofed chancel | Late 13th century | Although it is now a ruin, the church was still intact in 1883. Now only the tower and the chancel have retained their roofs; between them stand the walls of the nave and the transepts open to the sky. | II* |
| St Andrew, Ufford | Cambridgeshire; 52.6231°N 0.3863°W | A long stone church with a west tower and a rood tower at the junction of the nave and chancel | Late 13th century | Most of the church dates from the 14th century. It consists of a nave without a clerestory, aisles, and a chancel. There is also a west tower, and a rood turret near the junction of the nave and chancel, both of which are embattled. The church contains a series of 20th-century Arts and Crafts stained glass. | I |
| All Saints, West Harling | Norfolk; 52.4289°N 0.9022°E | A stone church with red tiled roofs seen from the south, showing a battlemented tower, a nave with a south porch, and a chancel at a lower level | Late 13th century | The church stands in an isolated position on the edge of Thetford Forest. Alterations were made to it in the 14th and 18th centuries, and it was restored in 1902. Some of its windows contain pieces of medieval stained glass, and in the nave floor are three brasses with dates in the late 15th and early 16th centuries. | I |
| St Mary, Redgrave | Suffolk; 52.3633°N 1.0197°E | A stone church seen from the south, showing a tower with pinnacles, a nave with clerestory, south aisle, south porch, and a chancel | c. 1280 | St Mary's contains thirteen hatchments, and a collection of important monuments, including one to Sir Nicholas Bacon, and one to Sir John Holt, Lord Chief Justice. In 2010 the entrance to a burial vault below the church was accidentally discovered. | I |
| St Margaret, Abbotsley | Cambridgeshire; 52.1935°N 0.2053°W | A stone church seen from the northeast showing part of the chancel, the nave with clerestory, a north porch, and an embattled tower with a statue on the top of each corner | c. 1300–10 | Statues of four kings stand on the corners of the summit of the tower. The church was restored in 1861 by William Butterfield, when the chancel, north vestry and north porch were rebuilt. Although the church is vested in the Trust, its chancel is still used as a parish church. | II* |
| St Peter, Cambridge | Cambridgeshire; 52.2115°N 0.1136°E | A flight of steps leads up to a stone church with a tower and steeple | Early 14th century | Although the church originated in the 11th century, the oldest remaining parts are the tower and spire which date from the 14th century. The rest of the church was rebuilt in 1781 on a smaller scale, making the tower and spire appear disproportionately large. The church was declared redundant in 1973. | II* |
| St Andrew, Frenze | Norfolk; 52.3802°N 1.1361°E | A small stone church with a red tiled roof seen from the southwest, showing a south porch and a small bellcote | Early 14th century | St Andrew's stands in an isolated position adjacent to Frenze Hall. It is a small, simple church, consisting of a nave without a chancel. Its contents include a large Jacobean pulpit with a tester, and a manorial box pew, both dating from the early 17th century, and seven brasses. | I |
| St Peter, Sudbury | Suffolk; 52.0387°N 0.7314°E | A flint church seen from the north with a battlemented tower to the right | 1330–48 | The church stands in a dominating position in the centre of the town. It was damaged during the Civil War by William Dowsing. The church was restored in 1858–59 by William Butterfield, and the chancel was restored and redecorated in 1898 by G. F. Bodley. | I |
| St Andrew, Buckland | Hertfordshire; 51.9866°N 0.0232°W | A stone church seen from the south with a red tiled roof showing, from the left, a relatively large embattled tower, then the south aisle with a porch | c.1348 | The nave and chancel date from about 1348, the tower from about 1400, and the south aisle and south porch from the late 15th century. A series of restorations took place in the 19th century. Its contents include a number of memorials, one of which, dated 1819, is by Chantrey. | II* |
| St Mary, Barton Bendish | Norfolk; 52.6198°N 0.52423°E | A simple stone church seen from the southeast, showing the chancel and the nave with a bellcote at the far end | 14th century | Although dating from the 14th century, the church has a Norman doorway moved from a nearby church which was being demolished. The tower fell in 1710 and has not been rebuilt. The roofs are thatched. Inside the church are box pews dating from 1789, and the remains of a wall painting depicting Saint Catherine with her wheel. | I |
| St Michael, Berechurch | Essex; 51.8600°N 0.8926°E | A red brick church with white stone banding and a red tiled roof seen from the southeast, showing the body of the church with a large window, a porch, and a battlemented tower | 14th century | The tower dates from the 14th century and the Audley chapel from the early 16th century. The rest of the church was entirely rebuilt in 1872, re-using some earlier material. In the chapel is a hammerbeam roof with carvings that include the emblems of Henry VIII and Catherine of Aragon. The church was declared redundant in 1975. The chapel was vested in the Trust in 1981, and the rest of the church has been converted for other uses. | II* |
| St Leonard, Colchester | Essex; 51.8847°N 0.9232°E | A stone church with a red tiled roof seen from the southeast showing the south aisle, south porch and tower | 14th century | The nave contains a 16th-century hammerbeam roof. During the Siege of Colchester in the Civil War, Royalist soldiers took refuge in the church. Over the centuries the church has required repeated restoration due to subsidence, or to inadequacies in the earlier construction. | II* |
| St Andrew, Covehithe | Suffolk; 52.3768°N 1.7055°E | The ruins of a stone church seen from the southeast showing the walls of the chancel and south aisle, with the intact tower beyond | 14th century | A small 17th-century church stands within the ruins of the much larger medieval church. The small church is still in use, while the tower and the ruins of the old church are maintained by the Trust. The church stands in an area of coast threatened by erosion. | I |
| St Mary, East Bradenham | Norfolk; 52.6389°N 0.8522°E | A stone church seen from the north east, with a battlemented tower, a large north porch, and the body of the church extending to the left | 14th century | St Mary's was built in the 14th century, with additions and alterations in the 15th and 19th centuries. Its tower is Perpendicular in style, and along both sides of the clerestory are six round windows with quatrefoil tracery. | I |
| St Mary, East Ruston | Norfolk; 52.8037°N 1.5061°E | A stone church seen from the southeast, showing the chancel, beyond which is a taller nave with a south aisle and porch, and a battlemented tower | 14th century | The north aisle was removed in 1778. The interior of the church is noted for its 15th-century painted and carved chancel screen, containing tracery and depictions of the Four Evangelists, four Doctors of the Church, and lions. | II* |
| All Saints, Ellough | Suffolk; 52.4233°N 1.5915°E | A plain stone church, partly rendered, seen from the south with a tower to the left and the body of the church extending to the right | 14th century | All Saints stands in an isolated position on the top of a low hill. It was restored in 1882 by William Butterfield when the east window was replaced. Inside the church are a 14th-century piscina and sedilia. The reredos and the chancel ceiling were designed by Butterfield. | I |
| St Peter, Hockwold | Norfolk; 52.4628°N 0.5375°E | A stone church seen from the southeast with a chancel, nave with clerestory, south aisle and porch and a tower | Mid 14th century | The nave and tower date from the middle of the 14th century and the chancel was added during the following century. The church was restored in 1857. Inside the church is a wall memorial to Sir Cyril Wyche who died in 1707, and who was one of the first members of the Royal Society. | I |
| St Mary, Lower Gravenhurst | Bedfordshire; 52.0045°N 0.3833°W | A stone church seen from the south, with a tower and stair turret to the left, and the red tiled body of the church to the right | 14th century | St Mary's is surrounded by fields and stands on a small hill. Its tower was added in about 1400. The nave and chancel have survived from the 14th century, as have the south door, the screen, the benches and the roof. | I |
| All Saints, Newton Green | Suffolk; 52.0365°N 0.7974°E | A flint church with red tiled roofs seen from the southwest, showing a tower with a battlemented parapet, the nave with a porch, and the chancel | 14th century | By the 1960s the church had fallen into disrepair, and it was divided at the chancel arch, the chancel continuing in use for worship. The nave contains a tomb dating from about 1300, 14th-century wall paintings depicting the Incarnation, and a 15th-century octagonal font. | II* |
| St John the Baptist, Parson Drove | Cambridgeshire; 52.6617°N 0.0543°E | A stone church seen from the southeast, with a long south aisle and clerestory and a battlemented tower | 14th century | Most of the fabric of the church dates from the late 15th or early 16th century, although in 1613 the chancel was destroyed by floods. Its contents include a Perpendicular octagonal font, a pulpit dated 1677, and fragments of 15th-century stained glass. | II* |
| St Mary, Potsgrove | Bedfordshire; 51.9590°N 0.6167°W | A plain stone church with a red tiled roof seen from the south, with the top of a small spire seen protruding above the left of the nave | 14th century | St Mary's was restored in 1880–81 by J. D. Sedding, who re-used some of the medieval materials including parts of the 14th-century rood screen. He also added the font and the spirelet on the tower. The west window consists almost completely of fragments of medieval glass. | II* |
| St Augustine, Norwich | Norfolk; 52.6372°N 1.2925°E | A church seen from the southwest with a large brick tower on the left and the flint body of the church on the right, showing the clerestory, south aisle and porch | 14th century | The body of the church is constructed in flint, and the tower in brick, the only brick tower in Norwich. The church contains a memorial to the architect Matthew Brettingham, who designed Holkham Hall, and another to the textile manufacturer, Thomas Clabburn, erected by 600 of his weavers. | I |
| St John the Baptist, Norwich | Norfolk; 52.6300°N 1.2927°E | A stone church seen from the southeast, showing the south aisle, clerestory, and west tower | 14th century | St John's stands near the centre of the city, and is almost as wide as it is long. In 1876 much of the stained glass was damaged by a gas explosion. Many of the furnishings were collected from other churches by Rev William Busby, vicar in the early 20th century. | I |
| St Mary, Rickinghall Superior | Suffolk; 52.3314°N 0.9939°E | A stone church seen from the southeast, showing a chancel with a red tiled roof, a much larger nave with a slated roof, and a battlemented tower | 14th century | The nave was rebuilt and the porch was added in the 15th century. The nave has four large Perpendicular windows on each side, and the porch has two storeys. In 1868 the church was restored by W. C. Fawcett. | I |
| St Mary the Virgin, Stonham Parva | Suffolk; 52.1991°N 1.0885°E | A stone church seen from the southeast with stepped gables, also showing the south chapel, porch, clerestory, and decorated tower | 14th century | St Mary's was remodelled in the early 16th century, and restored in the 19th century. The parapets of the nave are embattled, and those of the gables are crowstepped. The nave's double hammerbeam roof contains medieval carving. | I |
| All Saints, Thurgarton | Norfolk; 52.8763°N 1.2398°E | A small thatched flint church seen from the south, showing the nave and a smaller chancel | 14th century | This church has a thatched roof. Its west tower fell in 1882, and was replaced by a vestry at the west end in 1924. The interior of the church is notable for its medieval benches with carved ends, and there are the remains of wall paintings. | I |
| St John the Baptist, Yarburgh | Lincolnshire; 53.4172°N 0.0312°E | A tall church tower seen from the southwest with a battlemented parapet; the body of the church stretches beyond it | 14th century | St John's was largely rebuilt in 1405 after a fire. It was restored in 1854–55 by James Fowler of Louth. The church has a prominent sandstone tower, and its west doorway is embellished with carvings, including depictions of Adam and Eve and the serpent, and a Paschal Lamb. | I |
| St Mary, Bungay | Suffolk; 52.4556°N 1.4379°E | A flint church seen from the west, showing from the right, the tower and the west ends of the nave and the north aisle | 14th–15th century | Originally built as the church to a Benedictine priory, St Mary's became a parish church after the dissolution of the monasteries. In 1577 it was struck by lightning, and in 1688 it was damaged in a fire affecting much of the town. The church contains a variety of carvings on the roof bosses, a dole cupboard carved with a rat, and a 17th-century panel given to the church by the author H. Rider Haggard. | I |
| St Andrew, Redbourne | Lincolnshire; 53.4872°N 0.5345°W | A large stone church seen from the south, showing a tall west tower, the clerestory, south aisle, porch and mausoleum | 14th–15th century | The church was largely rebuilt in the later part of the 18th century, although the south chapel was rebuilt in the early 19th century as a mausoleum for the Dukes of St Albans. It was restored in 1888 by local architect W. W. Goodhand. The east window contains painted glass by William Collins dating from about 1840, depicting the Last Judgment. | I |
| St Mary, Chilton | Suffolk; 52.0461°N 0.7542°E | A brick tower with a battlemented parapet, and the body of the flint church beyond it | 15th century | St Mary's stands on the site of a deserted medieval village near Chilton Hall, just outside the Sudbury eastern bypass. The tower and a chantry chapel were added during the 16th century, and the church was restored in the 1860s. The chapel contains table tombs and memorials to the Crane family of Chilton Hall. | I |
| St Mary at the Quay, Ipswich | Suffolk; 52.0529°N 1.1564°E | A tall flint tower with the body of the church extending beyond it | 15th century | The church is lit by Perpendicular style windows, and contains a medieval double hammerbeam roof, and a 15th-century font. | II* |
| St Peter, North Barningham | Norfolk; 52.8888°N 1.1953°E | A flint church seen from the northeast showing the chancel, nave and aisle with a catslide roof, porch and battlemented tower | 15th century | St Peter's stands in an isolated position on a hill. In the floor of the nave is a pattern in the form of a rose window in brick and stone. The church contains monuments to members of the Palgrave family. | II* |
| St Cyriac and St Julitta, Swaffham Prior | Cambridgeshire; 52.2509°N 0.2959°E | The stone tower of a church with buttresses and an octagonal top stage with a clock | 15th century | This church shares its churchyard with the adjacent church of St Mary. The lower two stages of the tower are square, and its top stage is octagonal. In 1806 the nave and chancel were completely rebuilt by Charles Humfrey. | II* |
| St Andrew, Walpole | Norfolk; 52.7348°N 0.2225°E | A stone church see from the east showing a Perpendicular style east window, and beyond, a battlemented tower | 15th century | On the west side of the tower of this Perpendicular church is a chamber which was probably an anchorite cell. At the east end of the nave are two octagonal rood turrets, each surmounted by a spirelet. | I |
| St Laurence, Norwich | Norfolk; 52.6311°N 1.2901°E | Protruding above the houses in a street is a battlemented tower with a corner turret, and the body of the church beyond it | 1460–72 | The church stands on a sloping site. It has a large tower, and eleven windows along the clerestory on each side. Around the west doorway are carvings of the martyrdom of Saints Edmund and Lawrence. | I |
| All Saints, East Horndon | Essex; 51.5809°N 0.3591°E | A stone church seen from the northwest, showing a squat tower with turrets on the top corners and a pyramidal roof; a transept protrudes from the centre of the church and part of the listed stable is on the extreme left | Late 15th century | All Saints was built by the Tyrells of nearby Heron Hall to replace an earlier church. Its unusual features include turrets at the corners of the tower, and galleried upper rooms in both of the transepts. The south transept contains monuments to members of the Tyrell family. Since the 19th century the church has been damaged by decay, a bomb during the Second World War, fire caused by a tramp, and by thieves and vandals. | II* |
| All Saints, Conington | Cambridgeshire; 52.4583°N 0.2642°W | A stone church seen from the southeast with Perpendicular windows, embattled parapets, and a west tower with tall pinnacles | c. 1500 | The embattled parapets were restored in 1638 by Sir Thomas Cotton. A series of restorations and repairs was carried out during the 19th century. In the church are monuments to the Cotton and Heathcote families, and a 15th-century font. Most of the other furnishings date from 1841. | I |
| Oxhey Chapel, Oxhey | Hertfordshire; 51.6279°N 0.3925°W | A flint and brick chapel seen from an angle, with a brick gable at the near end, and a white bellcote towards the far end | 1612 | Built by Sir James Altham as a private chapel for the family and staff of Oxhey Place, it was damaged by Roundheads during the Civil War, and later used for storage. The chapel was repaired and restored twice in the 19th century, but deteriorated again during the 20th century. It has since been repaired, and stands between a modern church and its vicarage, surrounded by 1940s housing. | II* |
| St George, Goltho | Lincolnshire; 53.2828°N 0.3272°W | A small, simple brick church seen from the southwest in a churchyard, with a single bellcote at the west end | c. 1640 | This simple red brick church is built on the site of a former Saxon settlement. Alterations were made in the early 18th and the late 19th centuries. Two 17th-century gravestones have been incorporated into the floor of the nave. | II* |
| Guyhirn Chapel of Ease, Guyhirn | Cambridgeshire; 52.6158°N 0.0710°E | a small simple rectangular chapel with a red tiled roof | 1660 | Built as a chapel of ease following the Restoration, this is a simple plain building constructed in brick and stone. Its condition deteriorated during the 20th century, and the last service was held in 1960. It is now supported by the Friends of Guyhirn Chapel. | II* |
| All Saints (old), Great Steeping | Lincolnshire; 53.1533°N 0.1441°E | A small simple rectangular brick church seen from the southeast with two round-headed windows on the south side and a bellcote on the west gable | 1748 | All Saints is a simple Georgian-style church built on the site of an earlier medieval church. It was restored in 1908. A new church with the same dedication was built in 1891, and the old church was declared redundant in August 1973. | II* |
| St Andrew, Gunton | Norfolk; 52.8585°N 1.3096°E | A classical portico with four columns and the entrance to the church beyond | 1769 | The church stands adjacent to Gunton Hall. It was designed by Robert Adam in the form of a temple in Palladian style. At the entrance to the church is a portico. | I |
| All Saints, Haugham | Lincolnshire; 53.3127°N 0.0034°E | A slim ornate tower and spire seen between trees | 1840 | All Saints was designed by W. A. Nicholson to replace an earlier church on the site. Its ornate octagonal spire is supported by flying buttresses and is decorated with crockets. Except for a 15th-century font, a stoup and some memorial slabs, the fittings date from 1840. | II* |
| Holy Trinity, Halstead | Essex; 51.9435°N 0.6296°E | A church seen beyond houses and trees with a prominent tower and spire | 1843–44 | This church was designed by George Gilbert Scott in Early English style. The spire collapsed during its construction. Some of the fittings were designed by Scott and others were added later. The church was declared redundant in 1987. | II* |
| St John the Baptist, Burringham | Lincolnshire; 53.5713°N 0.7441°W | A red brick church seeen from the southeast with a squat loww tower and porch on the left, and a chancel with an apse on the right | 1856–57 | S. S. Teulon designed this brick church with its square short tower and apsidal east end. The interior is decorated in red, yellow and black brick, and it is floored with polychrome encaustic tiles. The church closed in 1983, and was declared redundant the following year. | II |
| St Helen, Little Cawthorpe | Lincolnshire; 53.3332°N 0.0363°E | A red brick church with a steeply sloping slate roof seen from the northwest; at the right is a bellcote with a spirelet, and the vestry with its chimney protrudes from the body of the church | 1860 | A small church, seating only about 60 people, St Helen's is built in red brick and decorated with bands of black brick. At its west end is a bellcote surmounted by a broached spirelet and a weathercock. The church was declared redundant in April 1996. | II |
| All Saints, Cambridge | Cambridgeshire; 52.2083°N 0.1232°E | A handsome stone church showing a wide window beyond which is a large tower with a spire and a single crocketted pinnacle | 1864 | All Saints, with its prominent spire, was designed by G. F. Bodley. Bodley also designed much of the internal decoration and fittings, including the font, the pulpit, and the aisle screen. Stained-glass windows are by Burne-Jones, Ford Madox Brown, William Morris, and C. E. Kempe. | I |
| St Michael the Archangel, Booton | Norfolk; 52.7574°N 1.1446°E | The west front of an elaborately designed stone church with slender twin towers, between which are a doorway, a large window and, at the top of the gable, a minaret-like pinnacle | Late 19th century | This church was designed by its rector, Rev Whitwell Elwin, without the help of an architect, and incorporated architectural details from other churches in the country. At the west end there are twin, slim towers set diagonally, and a three-tier pinnacle that has the appearance of a minaret. Inside is a hammerbeam roof decorated with carved wooden angels. | II* |

== See also ==
- List of churches preserved by the Churches Conservation Trust in the English Midlands
- List of churches preserved by the Churches Conservation Trust in Northern England
- List of churches preserved by the Churches Conservation Trust in Southeast England
- List of churches preserved by the Churches Conservation Trust in Southwest England

== Notes ==
^{A} The dates given for construction are often not exactly known. Where this is the case the century of first construction of the existing building is given.
