= St Gregory's Church, Heckingham =

Coordinates: 52.5352°N 1.5144°E

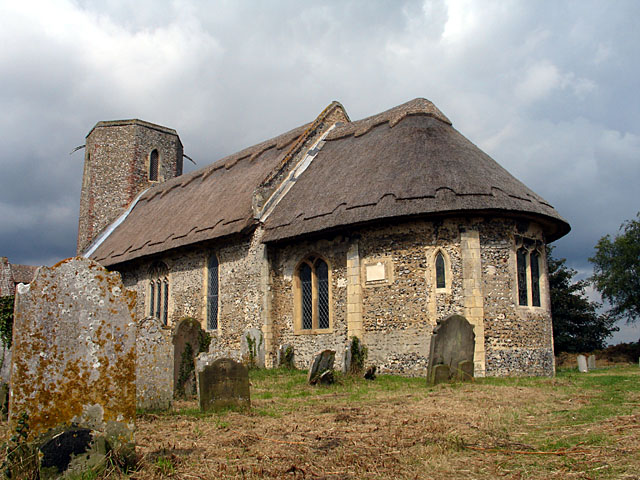
- St Gregory's Church, Heckingham, from the southeast

- Location in Norfolk
- OS grid reference: TM 385 988
- Country: England
- Denomination: Anglican
- Website: Churches Conservation Trust

History
- Dedication: Saint Gregory

Architecture
- Functional status: Redundant
- Heritage designation: Grade I
- Designated: 5 September 1960
- Architectural type: Church
- Style: Norman

Specifications
- Materials: Flint with limestone dressings, some red brick Thatched roofs

St Gregory's Church is a redundant Anglican church in the village of Heckingham, Norfolk, England. It is recorded in the National Heritage List for England as a designated Grade I listed building, and is under the care of the Churches Conservation Trust. It stands on a small hill overlooking the River Chet.

== History ==
St Gregory's originated in the 12th century, and most of its fabric dates from that and the next century. The south porch was added in the 15th century.

== Architecture ==
=== Exterior ===
The church is constructed in flint with limestone dressings, and some red brick. The roofs are thatched. Its plan consists of a nave with a north aisle and a south porch, a chancel with an apse at the east end, and a west tower. The lower third of the tower, dating from the 12th century, is round, and the upper two-thirds, added at a later date, is octagonal with brick quoins. The bell openings are lancets, and there are two lancet windows lower down on the west side, one above the other. The gabled porch is decorated with shields over the doorway. There are blocked windows in its east and west sides. In the south wall of the nave are a three-light window, dating from the 15th century, and a lancet window. The apsidal chancel is divided into five bays by pilasters acting as buttresses. In the south bay is a two-light window with Y-tracery. The southeast bay contains a lancet window and a memorial tablet. The east window has two lights containing Decorated tracery. The northeast bay contains a small lancet window, and in the north bay is a two-light window with ogee heads. There are windows with Y-tracery dating from about 1300 in the east and west windows of the north aisle. In its north wall are a two-light window with Y-tracery, two lancet windows, and a blocked round-headed doorway dating from the 12th century.

The Norman south doorway also dates from the 12th century, and is described as being "very fine". It has four orders of shafts, cushion capitals, and arches decorated with a variety of motifs, including zigzags, reels, bobbins, stars and wheels. The church is located close to St Margaret's Church, Hales, which also has a very fine Norman doorway, and there is speculation that both doorways were the work of the same mason.

=== Interior ===
The arcade is in three bays with pointed arches, carried on square piers without capitals. The chancel ceiling is plastered and coved; the nave ceiling is boarded. In the southeast corner of the nave is a recess for the former stairway to the rood loft. At the east end of the aisle is a raised area which contains some medieval tiles and a memorial slab. The rest of the aisle is partly paved with stone coffin slabs and more memorials. The font probably dates from the 12th century. It consists of a square bowl supported by an octagonal stem and four columns, on a square base. In the nave is a small memorial brass dated 1407. The stained glass in the east window dates from 1910 and depicts the Annunciation.

== See also ==
- List of churches preserved by the Churches Conservation Trust in the East of England
