= All Hallows Church, Clixby =

Coordinates: 53.5242°N 0.3385°W

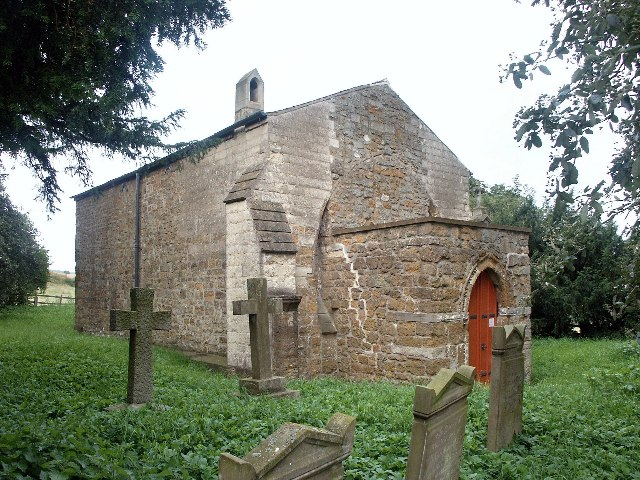
- All Hallows Church, Clixby, from the northwest

- Location in Lincolnshire
- OS grid reference: TA 103 043
- Location: Clixby, Lincolnshire
- Country: England
- Denomination: Anglican
- Website: Churches Conservation Trust

Architecture
- Functional status: Redundant
- Heritage designation: Grade II*
- Designated: 1 November 1966
- Architectural type: Church
- Style: Gothic
- Completed: 1889

Specifications
- Materials: Ironstone and limestone Slate roof

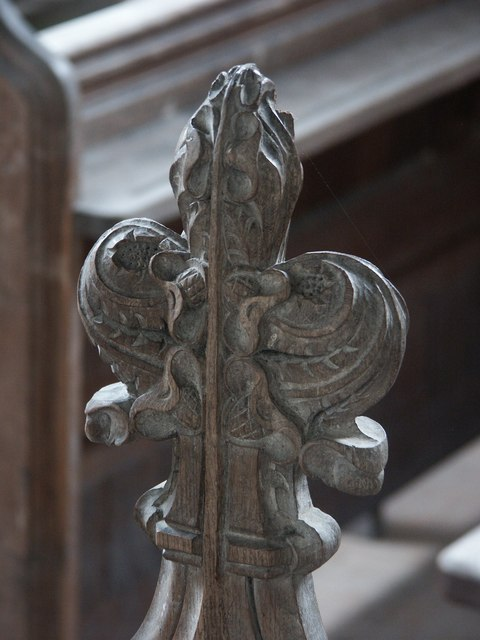
Poppyhead carving in the church

All Hallows Church, Clixby, is a redundant Anglican church in the hamlet of Clixby, about 1 mile (1.6 km) east of the village of Grasby, Lincolnshire, England. It is recorded in the National Heritage List for England as a designated Grade II* listed building, and is under the care of the Churches Conservation Trust. The church stands to the north of the A1084 road between Caistor and Brigg.

== History ==
The church dates from the 13th century, with additions and alterations during the following century. Deterioration occurred in the following centuries and by 1871 only the chancel had survived. This was restored in 1889 by Hodgson Fowler. The church was declared redundant in July 1973.

== Architecture ==
=== Exterior ===
All Hallows is constructed in ironstone and limestone with a slate roof. Some former openings have been blocked by brick. Its plan consists of the chancel, with a west porch which was added in the 1889. At the east end is a single bellcote. The porch has a flat roof, and it incorporates a 13th-century doorway. This has a pointed arch and its decoration includes some dogtooth carving. It is built against the blocked chancel arch, parts of which are still visible, including the ends of the nave arcades. The chancel stands on a plinth, and its north wall is blank. At the east end is a late 14th-century three-light window that was restored in the 19th century. The south wall of the chancel contains a priest's door, now blocked with brick, above which is a two-light window dating probably from the early 14th century. To the east of this is another similar window.

=== Interior ===
The outlines of the chancel arch are also visible on the inside of the west wall. On each side of it are recesses incorporating re-used 13th-century masonry. In the south wall is a sedilia and in the sanctuary is a piscina, both of which have ogee heads. On the sanctuary floor are Minton tiles. The ceiling dates from the 19th century and is decorated with Latin inscriptions praising the Virgin Mary. The font dates from the 15th century and was formerly in a church at Low Toynton in Lincolnshire. It consists of an octagonal bowl with panels containing carvings of angels, other figures, a Tudor rose, and other flowers. The base is also octagonal, and the stem incorporates carvings of saints. At the base of the altar steps is a ledger slab to the memory of a 14th-century priest. This has a Latin inscription around its margin, and is carved with a cross fleury and a chalice.

== External features ==
In the churchyard is a cross base dating probably from the 14th century. This was also restored by Hodgson Fowler. It is constructed in limestone and sandstone and consists of a square base with an octagonal shaft. It has been set on 19th-century octagonal steps, and the shaft has been extended, with a carving of the Crucifixion at its summit. It has been designated as a Grade II listed building.

== See also ==
- Grade II* listed buildings in West Lindsey
- List of churches preserved by the Churches Conservation Trust in the East of England
