= Old All Saints Church, Great Steeping =

Coordinates: 53.1533°N 0.1441°E

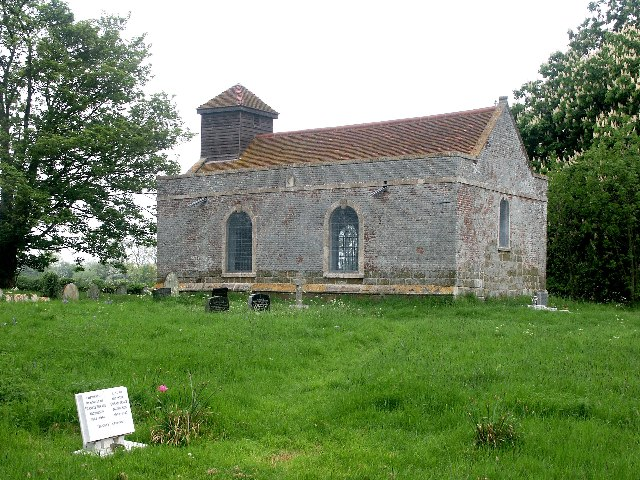
- Old All Saints Church, Great Steeping, from the southeast

- Location in Lincolnshire
- OS grid reference: TF 434 639
- Location: Great Steeping, Lincolnshire
- Country: England
- Denomination: Anglican
- Website: Churches Conservation Trust

Architecture
- Functional status: Redundant
- Heritage designation: Grade II*
- Designated: 17 December 1987
- Architectural type: Church
- Style: Georgian
- Groundbreaking: 1748
- Completed: 1908

Specifications
- Materials: Brick with limestone dressings and some greenstone Tiled roof

Old All Saints Church is a redundant Anglican church in the village of Great Steeping, Lincolnshire, England. It is recorded in the National Heritage List for England as a designated Grade II* listed building, and is under the care of the Churches Conservation Trust. The church stands in marshland, surrounded by a medieval field system, at the end of a lane leading south from the B1195 road, some 3 miles (5 km) southeast of Spilsby.

== History ==
The church was built in 1748 on the site of an earlier medieval church, and was restored in 1908. However a new church, also dedicated to All Saints, was built nearer the centre of the village in 1891, and the old church was declared redundant in August 1973.

== Architecture ==
All Saints is constructed in brick with limestone dressings, on a plinth of greenstone rubble. The roof is tiled. The architectural style is Georgian. Its plan is simple, consisting of a nave and chancel under one roof, and a bellcote at the west end. The bellcote is rectangular and weatherboarded, with a pyramidal roof. At the west end of the church is a doorway with a moulded architrave and a raised keystone. Above this is a stone inscribed with the dates 1748 and 1908, and there is a band with a pediment above that. Along each side of the church are two semicircular-headed windows. Between the windows on the south side is a sundial. At the east end is a smaller semicircular-headed window, above which is the outline of the gable of the chancel of the earlier church.

== See also ==
- List of churches preserved by the Churches Conservation Trust in the East of England
