= Oxhey Chapel =

Coordinates: 51.6279°N 0.3925°W

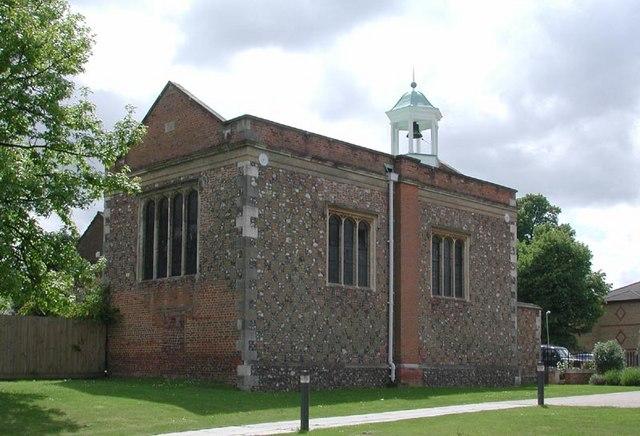
- Oxhey Chapel from the southeast

- Location in Hertfordshire
- OS grid reference: TQ 113 934
- Location: Oxhey, Watford, Hertfordshire
- Country: England
- Denomination: Anglican
- Website: Churches Conservation Trust

Architecture
- Functional status: Redundant
- Heritage designation: Grade II*
- Architectural type: Chapel
- Style: Gothic
- Groundbreaking: 1612
- Completed: 1897

Specifications
- Materials: Flint and brick, stone dressings Tiled roof

Oxhey Chapel is a redundant Anglican chapel in Oxhey, Hertfordshire, England. It is recorded in the National Heritage List for England as a designated Grade II* listed building, and is under the care of the Churches Conservation Trust. The chapel stands, surrounded by 1940s housing in South Oxhey between a modern church and its vicarage, some 2 miles (3.2 km) south of the centre of Watford.

== History ==
The chapel was built in 1612 by Sir James Altham as a private chapel for his family and staff who lived nearby at Oxhey Place. It is probably on the site of an earlier monastic church. In 1649 during the Civil War following the Battle of Uxbridge, it was used by Cromwell's Parliamentary forces as a store and a barracks. During this time they damaged the chapel, took lead from the roof to make musket balls, and created a new door in the east wall. In 1688 Sir John Bucknall became the owner of the house. He blocked the east door and added a reredos to the east end of the chapel. The wood for this came from the house which he had largely rebuilt. In 1704 a bellcote and a hipped, tiled roof were added to the chapel. The interior was restored in 1712, and the reredos was whitewashed. The chapel was used for worship until 1799, but after that it was used for storage.

In 1852 it was restored for T. Estcourt to be used again for worship by those living in the nearby hamlet. The whitewash was removed from the reredos, and the old pews and pulpit were replaced. In 1897 vestries were added, the windows were restored and the pews were rearranged in collegiate manner. This was paid for by the owner of Oxhey Place at that time, Thomas Blackwell, the co-founder of Crosse & Blackwell, the architect being J. E. K. Cutts. During the 20th century the fabric of the chapel deteriorated, and in the winter of 1962–63 part of the roof fell in. Repairs were carried out, including complete replacement of the roof and the bellcote. Although the chapel returned into use, it was eventually declared redundant, and in 1977 was vested in the Redundant Church Fund, the forerunner of the Churches Conservation Trust. It is still consecrated and is used at times for weddings.

== Architecture ==
=== Exterior ===
Oxhey Chapel is constructed in knapped flint and red brick, arranged in alternating squares forming a chequerwork pattern. The dressings are in stone, and the roof is tiled. Its plan is that of a rectangle with a narthex projecting to the west. The entrance has a moulded Tudor arched surround, with the date 1897 in the spandrels. On each side of the narthex is a two-light window, and above it is a four-light window. Above this is a stone cornice, and a brick gable with a stone coping. On the roof is a 20th-century octagonal wooden bellcote, with an ogee-headed cupola. At the corners of the chapel are stone quoins. Along the north and south sides are three-light windows, and a brick parapet. Between the windows on the north side is a 19th-century brick buttress. At the east end is a four-light window, above which is a brick gable containing a plaque with the dates 1612 and 1963.

=== Interior ===
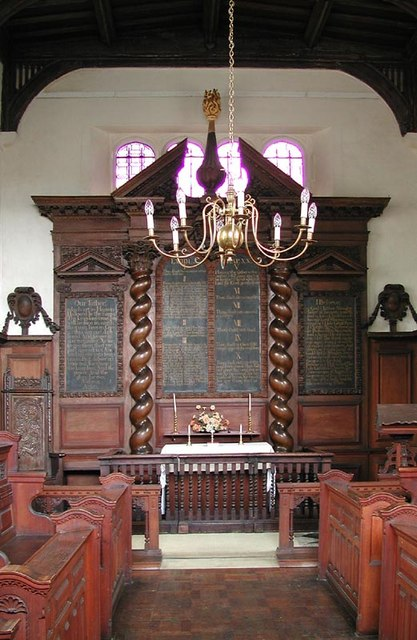
East end showing the reredos, candelabrum and benches

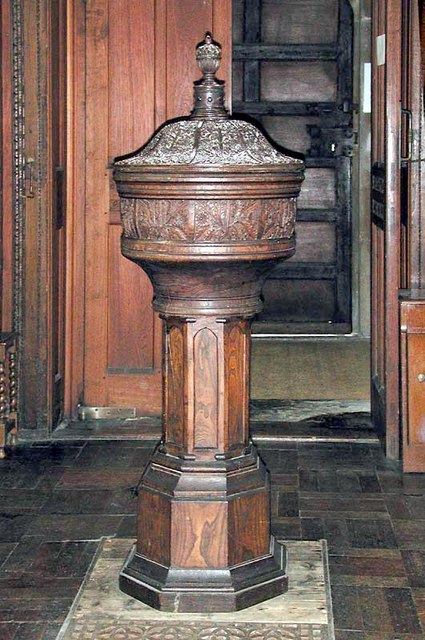
The font

The chapel contains a double row of stalls facing each other in collegiate fashion. The west door is surrounded by a doorcase consisting of carved Corinthian pilasters and an entablature. The reredos contains two twisted Solomonic columns framing panels containing the Ten Commandments, and outside them are panels with the Lord's Prayer and the Creed. At the top of the reredos is an open pediment enclosing a flaming urn. Above the central panels is a cartouche, and over the side panels are smaller closed pediments. The sanctuary is paved with black and white marble. The roof is in five bays. The wooden font dates from the 17th century. It has an octagonal base, a richly carved circular bowl, and a dome-shaped cover. From the roof hangs an eight-branch candelabrum. In the chapel is a wall tomb to Sir James Altham, who died in 1616, and his last wife Helen, who died in 1638. It consists of two praying figures facing each other in an alabaster and marble frame, consisting of Corinthian columns and an open segmental pediment containing a cartouche flanked by obelisks. At the west end is a marble memorial tablet to John Askill Bucknall dated 1797 by C. Regnant.

== See also ==
- List of churches preserved by the Churches Conservation Trust in the East of England
