= St Denys' Church, Little Barford =

Coordinates: 52.1982°N 0.2785°W

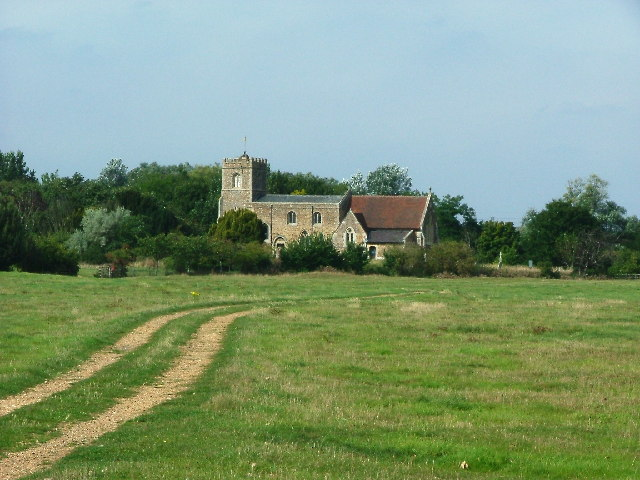
- St Denys' Church, Little Barford, from the south with the site of the deserted medieval village in the foreground

- Location in Bedfordshire
- OS grid reference: TL 178 569
- Location: Little Barford, Bedfordshire
- Country: England
- Denomination: Anglican
- Website: Churches Conservation Trust

History
- Dedication: Saint Denys

Architecture
- Functional status: Redundant
- Heritage designation: Grade II*
- Designated: 13 July 1964
- Architect: Arthur Blomfield (restoration)
- Architectural type: Church
- Style: Norman, Gothic, Gothic Revival

Specifications
- Materials: Cobbles with ashlar dressings Roofs tiled or slated

St Denys' Church is a redundant Anglican church in the village of Little Barford, Bedfordshire, England. It is recorded in the National Heritage List for England as a designated Grade II* listed building, and is under the care of the Churches Conservation Trust.

The church lies to the west of the village of Little Barford, overlooking the River Great Ouse, about 2 miles (3 km) south of St Neots.

== History ==
The oldest fabric in the church is in the nave and the chancel and dates from the Norman era. Alterations and additions took place in the 14th, 15th and 19th centuries. The tower and the clerestory were built in the late 15th century. In 1834 a south chapel was demolished and it was replaced in 1869 by a vestry and organ chamber. This was part of a restoration carried out by Arthur Blomfield. The church closed in 1972, and two years later was vested in the Redundant Churches Fund (the forerunner of the Churches Conservation Trust). The church had been built to serve a medieval village which has since been deserted.

== Architecture ==
=== Exterior ===
The church is constructed in cobbles with ashlar dressings. Some roofs are tiled, others are slated. The plan consists of a nave with a clerestory and a north aisle, a chancel with a south vestry, and a west tower. The tower is in three stages with an embattled parapet, paired bell openings, and a five-light west window. The east window in the chancel consists of three lancets, and in the north wall of the chancel are two windows in 14th-century style. In the south wall of the nave are three windows; one at a higher level dates from the 16th century, the others are from the 19th century, one in 12th-century style, and the other in the style of the 14th century. The south doorway dates from the 12th century. It has a semicircular arch, is decorated with zigzag and dogtooth designs, and has scalloped capitals. To the east of the doorway is a projecting stone for holding holy water. The clerestory has two windows on each side and a plain parapet. In the north wall of the aisle are re-set 12th-century windows, and windows dating from the 19th century.

=== Interior ===
The chancel arch dates from the 14th century, as does the two-bay south arcade between the chancel and the vestry. The north arcade between the nave and aisle has three bays and pointed arches. The octagonal font dates from the late 13th century. It stands on five columns and shows traces of red paint. In the nave is a brass dated 1535. The pews date from the 19th century. A piscina dating from the 15th century has been re-set in the vestry. Also in the vestry is the former rood screen, which was moved there in 1871 and its painting was restored. The west window contains stained glass from 1887 by the Kempe studio. Stained glass by Clayton and Bell was installed in the east window in 1869. At about the same time Heaton and Butler executed the paintings on the ceilings, and a mosaic reredos by W. B. Simpson was installed. The two-manual organ, made by Nicholson of Worcester, was purchased in 1870. There is a ring of four bells. The oldest of these was cast in 1661 by Christopher Graye, the next in 1681 by Richard Chandler III, and a third bell in 1759 by Joseph Eayre. The provenance of the fourth bell is not known.

== See also ==
- List of churches preserved by the Churches Conservation Trust in the East of England
