= All Saints Church, West Harling =

Coordinates: 52.4289°N 0.9022°E

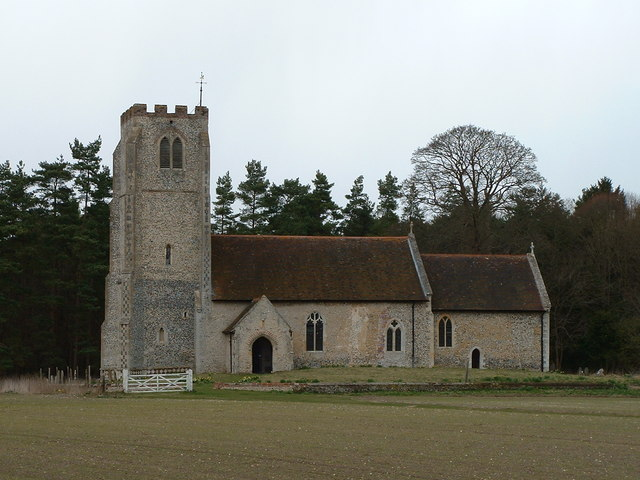
- All Saints Church, West Harling, from the south

- Location in Norfolk
- OS grid reference: TL 973 852
- Location: West Harling, Norfolk
- Country: England
- Denomination: Anglican
- Website: Churches Conservation Trust

Architecture
- Functional status: Redundant
- Heritage designation: Grade I
- Designated: 16 July 1958
- Architectural type: Church
- Style: Gothic, Gothic Revival

Specifications
- Materials: Flint and brick Tiled roofs

All Saints Church, West Harling, is a redundant Anglican church in the civil parish of Harling, Norfolk, England. It is recorded in the National Heritage List for England as a designated Grade I listed building, and is under the care of the Churches Conservation Trust. The church stands in an isolated position on the edge of Thetford Forest.

== History ==
The church dates from the late 13th century, with alterations and additions during the following century. It was repaired in 1733, further alterations were carried out in 1756, and the church was restored in 1902.

== Architecture ==
=== Exterior ===
All Saints is constructed in flint with ashlar dressings, and some brick. It has tiled roofs. The plan is simple, consisting of a nave with a south porch, a chancel, and a west tower. The tower is in two stages, and is supported by buttresses that are decorated with chequered flushwork. In the lower stage is a two-light west window in Perpendicular style that dates from the 1902 restoration. On the south side is a niche with a trefoil head for a statue. At a higher level on the north and south sides are windows, again with trefoil heads. In the upper stage of the tower are paired lancet bell openings, above which is a crenellated parapet; these all date from 1756. The porch is gabled and has diagonal buttresses. In each side of it are two-light windows. In the north wall of the nave are two two-light early Perpendicular windows, dating from the middle of the 14th century, and a doorway. There is a similar window in the south wall, and a two-light window with plate tracery. The south wall of the chancel has a two-light window dating from 1902 and a priest's door. The east window has three lights and dates from about 1300. In the north wall of the chancel is a 13th-century lancet window and a dormer window with Y-tracery illuminating the organ loft. Around the exterior of the church are carved heads.

=== Interior ===
The nave has a hammerbeam roof and the chancel roof is barrel vaulted, both of these dating from 1902. In the chancel are a single piscina, a double piscina, and a niche for a sedilia. On the back of the niche is a fragment of painted diaper decoration. In some of the windows are pieces of medieval stained glass. The octagonal font dates from the 15th century. In the nave floor are three brasses with dates in the late 15th and early 16th centuries. The reredos contains Flemish panels, and in the church is a bust dating from 1780.

== See also ==
- List of churches preserved by the Churches Conservation Trust in the East of England
