= Monksthorpe =

Hamlet in the district of East Lindsey, Lincolnshire, England

Coordinates: 53.165856°N 0.159548°E

- Location within Lincolnshire
- OS grid reference: TF444653
  - London: 115 mi (185 km) S
- District: East Lindsey
- Shire county: Lincolnshire
- Region: East Midlands
- Country: England
- Sovereign state: United Kingdom
- Post town: Spilsby
- Postcode district: PE23
- Police: Lincolnshire
- Fire: Lincolnshire
- Ambulance: East Midlands
- UK Parliament: Louth and Horncastle

Monksthorpe is a hamlet in the district of East Lindsey, Lincolnshire, England. It lies 3 miles (5 km) east from the town of Spilsby and north from the village of Great Steeping .

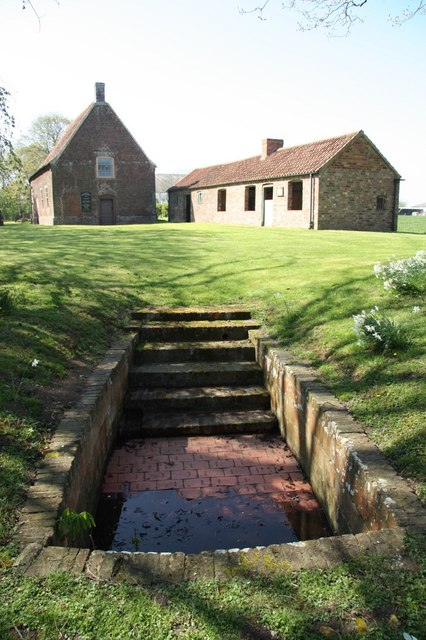
Monksthorpe Baptistry

Monksthorpe chapel is a Grade II* listed building dating from 1701, now in the care of the National Trust. In the grounds is a Grade II* listed open air total submersion font, believed to be one of only two in the country.
