= St Andrew's Church, Sapiston =

Coordinates: 52.3328°N 0.8172°E

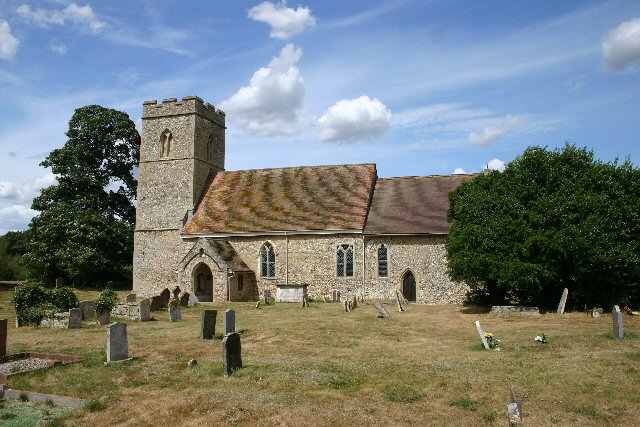
- St Andrew's Church, Sapiston, from the south

- Location in Suffolk
- Location: Sapiston, Suffolk
- Country: England
- Denomination: Anglican
- Website: Churches Conservation Trust

Architecture
- Functional status: Redundant
- Heritage designation: Grade I
- Designated: 14 July 1955
- Architectural type: Church
- Style: Norman, Gothic

Specifications
- Materials: Flint, with some ragstone Tiled roofs

St Andrew's Church is a redundant Anglican church in the village of Sapiston, Suffolk, England. It is recorded in the National Heritage List for England as a designated Grade I listed building, and is under the care of the Churches Conservation Trust. It stands at the end of a track to the south of the village, adjacent to Grange Farm and near to a ford crossing the Black Bourne stream. The church served what became a deserted medieval village.

== History ==
The oldest part of the church is the Norman south doorway which dates from the 12th century. The remainder of the nave, the chancel and the tower date from the 14th century. The church underwent a restoration in 1847. The parish of Sapiston was combined with that of Honington in 1972. Two years later St Andrew's was declared redundant and was vested in the Redundant Churches Fund (the forerunner of the Churches Conservation Trust).

== Architecture ==
=== Exterior ===
The church is constructed in flint, with some ragstone. The steeply pitched roofs are tiled. Its plan consists of a nave with a south porch, a chancel and a west tower. The tower is in three stages, separated by string courses, without buttresses. It has an internal staircase and an embattled parapet. In the top stage are two-light bell openings with Y-tracery. The south porch dates from the 15th century, and has a plain doorway and two two-light windows in each side wall. It is floored with medieval coffin lids. The south doorway has two orders of columns, and three orders in the round-headed arch. The inner order of the arch is plain, and the outer two orders are decorated with acanthus leaves, which is an unusual motif in Suffolk. Above the arch is a weathered stone carved with the image of a face, probably human. Along the south wall of the church are two two-light windows with Y-tracery, and another two-light window with a Tudor arch. In the south wall of the chancel is a single-light window, and a doorway with pointed arch. The east window has three lights with reticulated tracery.

=== Interior ===
Inside the church, on the north wall of the nave, are the remains of an Easter Sepulchre, an arched recess. Above this are traces of a wall painting. This depicts the martyrdom of Saint Edmund. Around the walls are benches, two of which are smaller with low seats, which were probably intended for children. The octagonal font dates from the 13th century; it is plain and has a damaged Jacobean cover. In the chancel is a piscina with an ogee head, and a blocked south window. The church contains a memorial to the local poet Robert Bloomfield, and the royal arms of George II. The four bells have been dismounted; three of them are dated 1591, 1608 and 1730 respectively.

== See also ==
- List of churches preserved by the Churches Conservation Trust in the East of England
