= Hales =

Village in Norfolk, England

Coordinates: 52.521861°N 1.509247°E

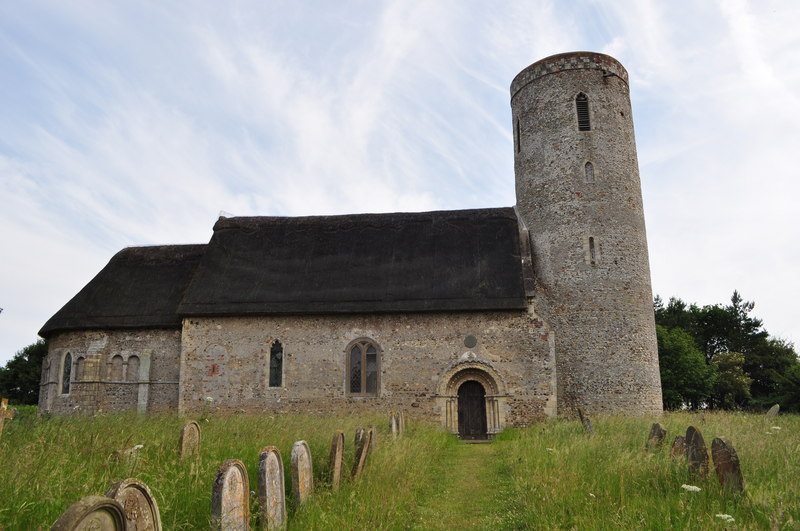
- St. Margaret's Church

- Location within Norfolk
- Area: 1.54 sq mi (4.0 km^{2})
- Population: 525 (2021 census)
  - Density: 341/sq mi (132/km^{2})
- OS grid reference: TM382972
- Civil parish: Hales
- District: South Norfolk
- Shire county: Norfolk
- Region: East
- Country: England
- Sovereign state: United Kingdom
- Post town: NORWICH
- Postcode district: NR14
- Dialling code: 01508
- Police: Norfolk
- Fire: Norfolk
- Ambulance: East of England
- UK Parliament: South Norfolk

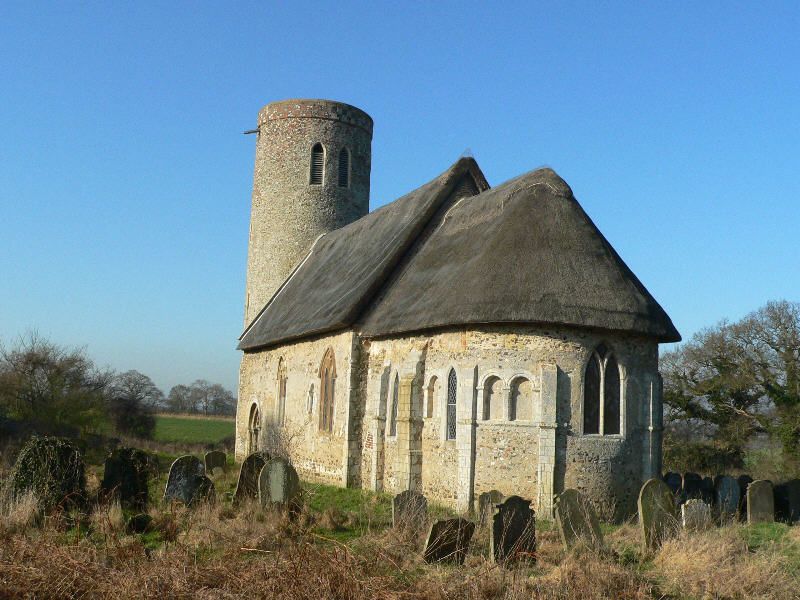
Hales St Margaret

Hales is a village and civil parish in the English county of Norfolk.

Hales is located 1.5 miles (2.4 km) south-east of Loddon and 11 miles (18 km) south-east of Norwich.

== History ==
Hales' name is of Anglo-Saxon origin and derives from the Old English for nooks of land.

In the Domesday Book, Hales is listed as a settlement of 54 households in the hundred of Clavering. In 1086, the village was divided between the estates of Roger Bigod, Godric the Steward, St Edmunds Abbey and Ralph Baynard.

Hales Hall was built in 1478 by Sir James Hobart, the Attorney General of King Henry VII. Hobart acquired the estate from Sir Roger de Hales, whose daughter had married the Duke of Norfolk. In 1666, the last Hales heiress was Lady Dionysia Williamson, who left her estate to her nephew, John Hoskins.

In 1957, two Gloster Meteors of No. 74 Squadron RAF crashed in Hales after a mid-air collision. Both pilots (FO W.R. Taylor of Cleethorpes and FO R.G. Baillie of Edinburgh) were killed.

== Geography ==
According to the 2021 census, Hales has a total population of 525 people which demonstrates an increase from the 469 people listed in the 2011 census.

Hales is located at the junction of the A146, between Norwich and Lowestoft, and the B1136, between Hales and Haddiscoe.

== St Margaret's Church ==
Hales' parish church is dedicated to Saint Margaret the Virgin and is one of Norfolk's 124 remaining round-tower churches. St. Margaret's is located outside of the village on Church Lane and has been Grade I listed since 1960. The church is no longer open for Sunday services and is in the care of the Churches Conservation Trust.

St. Margaret's was lightly restored in the Victorian era by Herbert John Green and still hosts medieval wall paintings.

== Governance ==
Hales is part of the electoral ward of Loddon & Chedgrave for local elections and is part of the district of South Norfolk.

The village's national constituency is South Norfolk which has been represented by the Labour's Ben Goldsborough MP since 2024.

== War Memorial ==
Hales War Memorial is shared with nearby Heckingham and is a rough-hewn Celtic cross on Yarmouth Road. The memorial was damaged in a car accident in 1999 and was subsequently restored. The memorial lists the following names for the First World War:

Rank	Name	Unit	Date of death	Burial/Commemoration
Cpl.	William Edge	1st Bn., Border Regiment	28 Apr. 1915	Helles Memorial
Cpl.	James Edge	11th Bn., Sherwood Foresters	7 Jun. 1917	Menin Gate
LCpl.	Harry Scarfe	8th Bn., Norfolk Regiment	1 Jul. 1916	Thiepval Memorial
LCpl.	Walter Stone	9th Bn., Norfolk Regt.	18 Oct. 1916	Thiepval Memorial
Dvr.	William L. Herwin	141st Coy., Royal Engineers	28 Mar. 1918	Brandhoek Cemetery
Pte.	Arthur G. Gower	1st Bn., Dragoon Guards	6 Jun. 1915	Bailleul Cemetery
Pte.	George Brister	1st Bn., Essex Regiment	14 Apr. 1917	Arras Memorial
Pte.	Victor G. Stone	7th Bn., Norfolk Regiment	13 Oct. 1915	Loos Memorial
Pte.	Walter Tipple	7th Bn., Norfolk Regt.	28 Mar. 1917	St. Margaret's Churchyard
Pte.	Albert R. Scarfe	8th Bn., Norfolk Regt.	22 Oct. 1917	Tyne Cot
Pte.	John E. Smith	1st Bn., Northamptonshire Regiment	9 Sep. 1916	Thiepval Memorial
By1C	Allan I. Denny (Note: Denny died of cerebro-spinal meningitis whilst serving on the shore establishment, HMS Ganges.)	HMS Ganges	5 Aug. 1916	St. Mary's Churchyard
Dhd.	Alfred J. Edge	H.M. Drifter EBC	8 Sep. 1915	St. James' Churchyard

The following names were added after the Second World War:

Rank	Name	Unit	Date of death	Burial/Commemoration
Dvr.	Ronald Tovell	Royal Army Service Corps	15 Dec. 1945	St. Margaret's Churchyard
Pte.	Sydney W. Wade	4th Bn., Royal Norfolk Regiment	31 Jan. 1942	Maitland Cemetery
Rfn.	Ernest E. Crisp	2nd Bn., London Irish Rifles	5 Aug. 1943	Catania War Cemetery
