= St Andrew's Church, Gunton =

Coordinates: 52.8585°N 1.3096°E

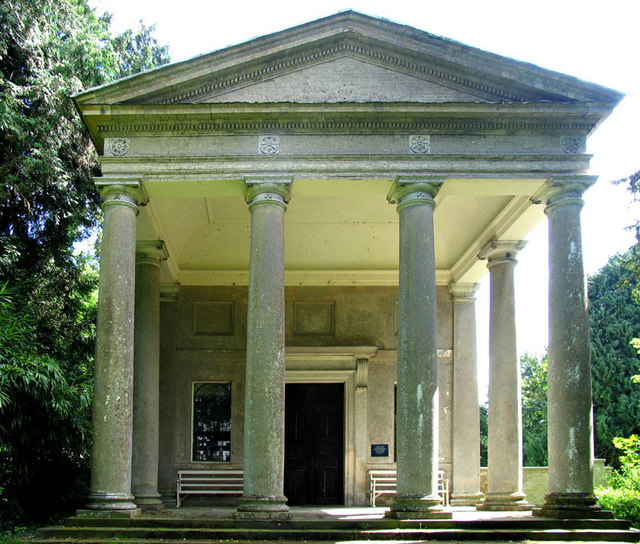
- Portico of St Andrew's Church, Gunton

- Location in Norfolk
- OS grid reference: TG 229 342
- Location: Gunton Hall, Norfolk
- Country: England
- Denomination: Anglican
- Website: Churches Conservation Trust

Architecture
- Functional status: Redundant
- Heritage designation: Grade I
- Designated: 24 April 1987
- Architect: Robert Adam
- Architectural type: Church
- Style: Neo-Palladian
- Completed: 1769

Specifications
- Materials: Gault brick, partly rendered, with stone dressings

St Andrew's Church is a redundant Anglican church adjacent to Gunton Hall, in the parish of Hanworth, Norfolk, England. It is recorded in the National Heritage List for England as a designated Grade I listed building, and is under the care of the Churches Conservation Trust. The church stands in woodland to the east of the hall.

== History ==
The church was built in 1769. It was designed by Robert Adam for the owner of Gunton Hall, Sir William Harbord, to replace a former medieval church. It is the only building designed by Adam in Norfolk, and his only complete church in England.

== Architecture ==
=== Exterior ===
St Andrew's is constructed in gault brick, parts of which are rendered, with stone dressings. It is in the form of a temple with a tetrastyle (four columns) prostyle (protruding forward) portico. It is in Neo-Palladian style. The portico is set on three steps. It has four Doric columns along the front, and another similar column on each side, making it two bays deep. The architrave is plain, the frieze above it is decorated with four rosettes, and the cornice has dentils, as does the pediment. In the centre of the west end of the church is a doorway with a square-headed window on each side. Above each window and the doorway is a blank square with a recessed panel. The body of the church is four bays deep. On both the north and south sides are four niches, three square-headed windows, a plain architrave, rosettes in the frieze and dentils in the cornice. On the east side are three blank rectangular panels, the central one with a memorial tablet inscribed with the date 1665.

=== Interior ===
The doorway leads to a circular entrance lobby with two doors. The door on the right leads to a stairway. The other door leads into the church, which is paved in stone with black diamond-shaped inserts. At the east end of the church is a step, then two curved steps leading up to the altar. Behind the altar is an oak reredos with fluted Corinthian columns having gilded capitals. In the central panel of the reredos is a painting of the Virgin and Child and other figures. The pews have wrought iron candle holders, and at the west end of the church are two box pews with brass gas lamps. The west gallery is supported by fluted pilasters with gilded capitals. The west wall is panelled, and the other walls have ornate plasterwork. In the ceiling is an oval panel containing guilloché and a central rose. On the north, south and west walls are hatchments. In the west gallery is a two-manual organ.

== See also ==
- List of churches preserved by the Churches Conservation Trust in the East of England
