= St Helen's Church, Little Cawthorpe =

Coordinates: 53.3332°N 0.0363°E

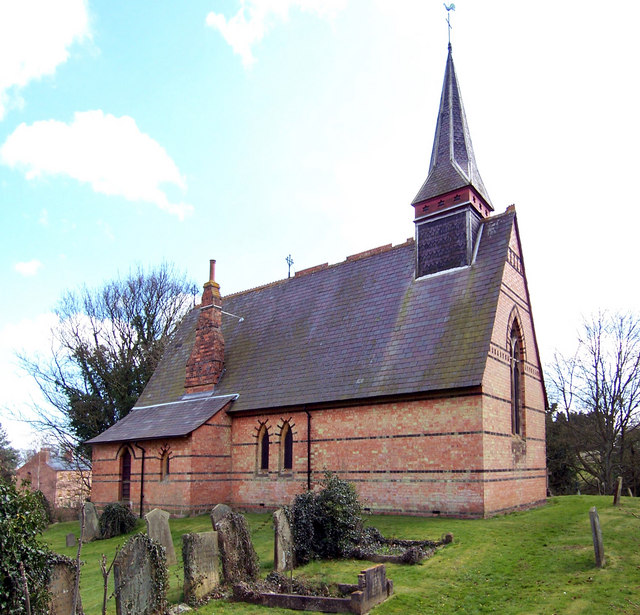

- Location in Lincolnshire
- OS grid reference: TF 356 837
- Location: Little Cawthorpe, Lincolnshire
- Country: England
- Denomination: Anglican
- Website: Churches Conservation Trust

History
- Dedication: Saint Helen

Architecture
- Functional status: Redundant
- Heritage designation: Grade II
- Designated: 9 March 1967
- Architect: Robert J. Withers
- Architectural type: Church
- Style: Gothic Revival
- Completed: 1860

Specifications
- Materials: Brick with slated roof

St Helen's Church is a redundant Anglican church in the village of Little Cawthorpe, Lincolnshire, England. It is recorded in the National Heritage List for England as a designated Grade II listed building, and is under the care of the Churches Conservation Trust. Little Cawthorpe is about 1 mile (1.6 km) southwest of the village of Legbourne, and 3 miles (4.8 km) southeast of Louth.

== History ==
The church was built in 1860, and designed by Robert J. Withers. It was declared redundant in April 1996.

== Architecture ==
=== Exterior ===
St Helen's is constructed in red brick, with decoration in dark burnt brick. The dressings are in limestone ashlar, with some green sandstone and marble. The roofs are slated with red ridge tiles. It is a small church, seating only about 60 people. Its plan is simple, and consists of a nave with a south porch, a chancel, and a north vestry with a chimney. At the west end is a bellcote. On the roof at the east end, and at the junction between the nave and the chancel are wrought iron finials. The bellcote has hung slates in its lower part, above which is a row of star-shaped openings. On its summit is a broached spirelet surmounted by a weathercock. At the west end of the church is a large pointed window with two lights. On the north side is the vestry with two lancet windows to the east. The vestry has a doorway with a small pointed window to its right, and in its east wall is a two-light pointed window. The east window is large, with three lights. Beneath it is a foundation stone inscribed with the date 1860. On the south side of the chancel is a two-light window, and there is a pair of lancet windows in the south wall of the nave. The gabled porch has a pointed doorway.

=== Interior ===
Inside the church, the pointed chancel arch has two orders and is decorated with red diamond-shaped tiles. Its responds have marble shafts and ornate capitals. In the north wall of the chancel are three sharply pointed openings, the one to the east leading to the vestry. In the south wall is a plain sedilia. Behind the altar is an ornate reredos composed of encaustic tiles. The altar rail, the octagonal font, and the polygonal pulpit all date from the 19th century. There is a monument under the west window dated 1860. The windows contain richly coloured stained glass.

== See also ==
- List of churches preserved by the Churches Conservation Trust in the East of England
