= St Nicholas Church, Feltwell =

Coordinates: 52.4891°N 0.5209°E

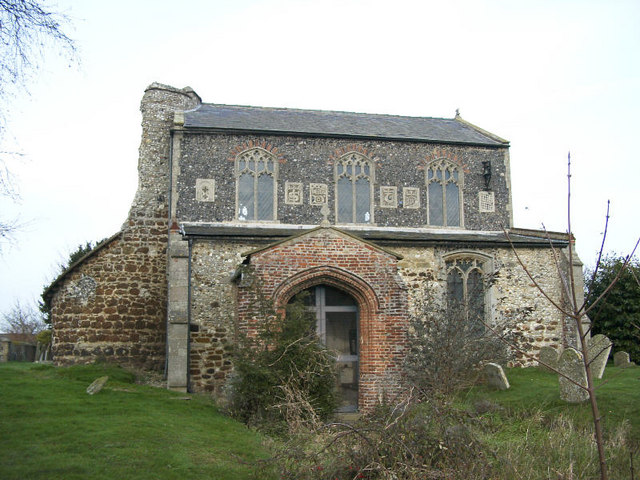
- St Nicholas Church from the south

- Location in Norfolk
- OS grid reference: TL 712 909
- Location: Feltwell, Norfolk
- Country: England
- Denomination: Anglican
- Website: Churches Conservation Trust

History
- Dedication: Saint Nicholas

Architecture
- Functional status: Redundant
- Heritage designation: Grade I
- Designated: 8 July 1959
- Architectural type: Church
- Style: Anglo-Saxon, Norman, Gothic
- Groundbreaking: c. 683
- Closed: 1973

Specifications
- Length: 36 feet (11.0 m)
- Width: 48 feet (14.6 m)
- Materials: Body: flint and brick with ashlar dressings Tower: ferruginous conglomerate Roofs tiled Porch: brick

St Nicholas Church is a redundant Anglican church in the village of Feltwell, Norfolk, England. It is recorded in the National Heritage List for England as a designated Grade I listed building, and is under the care of the Churches Conservation Trust. It has a partly collapsed west tower, and is unusual in being broader than it is long, having two side aisles and no chancel.

== History ==
The original church on the site was built in about 683. This was partly demolished and rebuilt in about 1072. The aisles, clerestory and an octagonal top to the tower were added in the 15th century. In the latter half of that century the church was damaged by fire, and it was repaired in 1491; however, by the 16th century it had fallen into decay. In 1805 it was described as being 36 feet (11.0 m) long and, including the aisles, 48 feet (14.6 m) wide. The chancel was 27 feet (8.2 m) by 17 feet (5.2 m), the church had a thatched roof, and it was approached up two steps. The tower was round at the bottom, octagonal at the top and contained five small bells.

The church was restored in 1830, although the chancel was demolished in 1862. The parish had been united with that of St Mary's Church in the village in 1805, and St Nicholas closed for regular services (except for funerals) in about 1864. The tower collapsed during repairs in 1898 and was not rebuilt. During the Second World War the church was used as a place of worship for German prisoners of war. It was declared redundant in 1973 and vested in the Churches Conservation Trust in 1975. It is now cared for by the Feltwell Historical and Archaeological Society on behalf of the Trust and holds two services each year.

== Architecture ==
=== Exterior ===
The body of the church is constructed in flint and brick with ashlar stone dressings. The roofs are slated. The remains of the tower are in ferruginous conglomerate, and the porch is built in brick. Its plan consists of a nave with north and south aisles, a south porch, and the remains of a west tower. The remains of the tower and the west wall of the church are Anglo-Saxon. Most of the church is in Perpendicular style. In the west wall of the south aisle is a two-light window. The porch is gabled with diagonal buttresses and has blocked square-headed side windows. In the south and east walls of the south aisle are two-light windows. The south wall of the clerestory contains three two-light Perpendicular windows. These are flanked by six flushwork panels carved with decorated letters and designs. The first panel from the left is decorative, and the next one is carved with the letters "S" and "t" surmounted by a crown. The next three panels spell out the names or initials of either the churchwardens at the time, or a pair of benefactors. The panel on the right bears a chequer pattern. Above the last panel is a gleaners' bell. The Perpendicular three-light east window was moved from the original chancel when it was demolished. There is a two-light Perpendicular window in the east wall of the north aisle, and a three-light window in the north wall. Also in the north wall is a doorway over which is a churchwardens' plaque dated 1830. The windows in the north wall of the clerestory are similar to those in the south wall, without any intervening panels.

=== Interior ===
The porch has stone benches along each side, and to the right of the doorway are what are thought to be the remains of a stoup. The interior of its roof is ornate and has spandrels carved with foliage. Inside the church are two three-bay arcades. The south arcade dates from the 13th century and is carried on quatrefoil piers. The north arcade is from the 15th century, its piers being lozenge-shaped in section. The semicircular tower arch is massive and Norman in style. In the south aisle is a piscina with a cinquefoil head. Along the wall of the north aisle is set a seat, which was used when the church contained no other seating. Also in the north aisle is a stone coffin with a cross on its lid, which was dug up outside the north door in 1830. A Norman pilaster carved with chevrons has been re-set into the wall to the left of the altar.

The wooden crucifix on the altar was carved by a German prisoner of war. The font was moved from a church in Stanton, Suffolk, in 1962–63, the costs of transporting and re-erecting this being borne by the Royal Air Force. The pulpit came from St Martin's Church, Cambridge, as a gift about the same time. The single-manual organ was made by G. M. Holdich of London in 1840. It was moved here from St Mary's Church in the village in 1925 and was restored in 1977. When the tower collapsed, three of the five bells were damaged beyond repair. One of the surviving bells was dedicated to St Etheldreda and presented to Ely Cathedral. The other bell was sold and is now in St Mark's Church, Gabalfa, Cardiff. In 1970 the tongues (clappers) of the three destroyed bells were restored and attached to the west wall of the church.

== See also ==
- List of churches preserved by the Churches Conservation Trust in the East of England
