= St Peter's Church, Kingerby =

Coordinates: 53.4219°N 0.4104°W

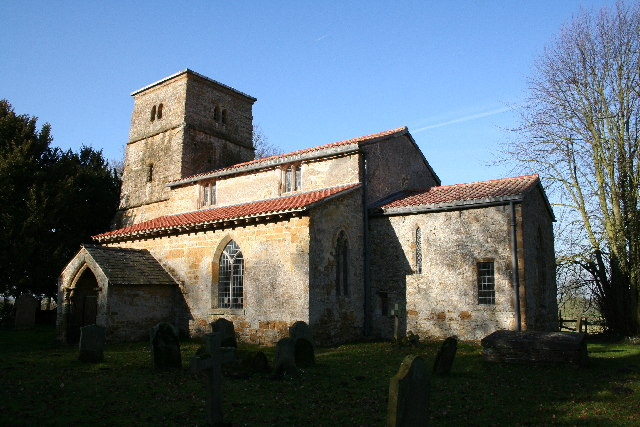
- St Peter's Church, Kingerby, from the southeast

- Location in Lincolnshire
- OS grid reference: TF 057 929
- Location: Kingerby, Lincolnshire
- Country: England
- Denomination: Anglican
- Website: Churches Conservation Trust

History
- Dedication: Saint Peter

Architecture
- Functional status: Redundant
- Heritage designation: Grade I
- Designated: 1 November 1966
- Architectural type: Church
- Style: Anglo-Saxon, Norman, Gothic

Specifications
- Materials: Ironstone with pantile roofs

St Peter's Church is a redundant Anglican church in Kingerby, Lincolnshire, England. It is recorded in the National Heritage List for England as a designated Grade I listed building, and is under the care of the Churches Conservation Trust. The church stands in an isolated position opposite the grounds of Kingerby Hall.

== History ==
The earliest fabric in the church dates from the early 11th century. The church originally served a village which has subsequently been deserted. Additions and alterations were made to the church in the 12th, 13th, 14th and early 17th centuries, and minor repairs were undertaken in the 19th century. During the 14th and 15th centuries the lords of the manor were the Disney family. Sir William Disney fought with Edward, the Black Prince, and died in 1316. His son, also named Sir William, died in 1349 during the Black Death. They were ancestors of the film maker, Walt Disney. Between the 17th and 19th centuries, the estate of Kingerby Hall was owned by Roman Catholic families, and was used to hide recusant priests. The last holders of the manor were the Young family.

== Architecture ==
=== Exterior ===
The church is constructed in ironstone rubble with pantile roofs. Some of the walls have been patched with bricks or plaster. Its plan consists of a two-bay nave with a clerestory, a south aisle, a south porch, a chancel, and a west tower. There are remnants of a north aisle which has been demolished. The tower tapers and has three stages separated by string courses. At the corners are buttresses rising to the top of the lowest stage. On the west side of the lowest stage is a window with a pointed arch and a trefoil head. The middle stage contains a flat-headed window on the south side. The bell openings in the top stage are paired, and have almost triangular heads. On the east side, above the roof, can be seen the line of an earlier roof which is thought to have dated from the 11th century. On the north side of the church are three large buttresses, and the blocked arcade from the previous north aisle. In the easternmost bay is a re-used 14th-century three-light window. There are no windows in the north face of the clerestory. The chancel is at a much lower level than the nave, and this reveals the line of the earlier roof on the east wall of the nave. The east window has two lights. On the south side of the chancel are a rectangular altar window, a narrow lancet window at a higher level, and a small single-light window at a low level. The south aisle has two-light windows on the east, south and west sides. The doorway to the porch dates from the early 13th century and has dog-tooth decoration. Inside the porch are stone benches. The doorway to the church dates from the 12th century and is round-arched. On the south side of the clerestory are two rectangular windows.

=== Interior ===
The two-bay south arcade has an octagonal pier with plain capitals. The nave has a king post roof carved with a heart and rosettes. At the west end of the nave, at a high level, is a circular opening dating from the early 11th century; it is likely to have been the west light of the original Anglo-Saxon church. In the east window of the aisle is stained glass dating from the 14th century. This depicts the Crucifixion, Saint Catherine with her wheel, and Saint Cecilia with an organ. In the east window of the aisle is stained glass dating from 1850. The octagonal font is from the 15th century, as is the prayer desk in the chancel. The pulpit dates from the 19th century. An alms box, carved from a single piece of wood, is carved with an inscription and the date 1639.

In the west corner of the aisle are two monuments, consisting of effigies on tomb chests. One of the effigies is that of a knight from the middle of the 13th century, lying with his legs crossed, and with puppies lying beside his pillow. He carries a large shield and is dressed in a chain mail surcoat. The other effigy is from the late 14th century, and has been partly truncated. It consists of a knight, his hands held in prayer, and his feet on a dog. He is also dressed in chain mail and has a surcoat carved with heraldic symbols. In the chancel is a coffin-shaped slab carved in low relief. It depicts a 14th-century knight with a beard, and shows his head and the upper part of his body, and his shoes, but the lower part of his body and his legs have been replaced by an elaborate cross. The monuments are thought to represent members of the Disney family. In the chancel are three 19th-century marble memorials to members of the Young family of Kingerby Hall.

== External features ==
In the churchyard is a tomb slab on a brick base dated 1699 which has been designated as a Grade II listed building.

== See also ==
- List of churches preserved by the Churches Conservation Trust in the East of England
