= Clixby =

Village in Lincolnshire, England

Coordinates: 53.523608°N 0.338190°W

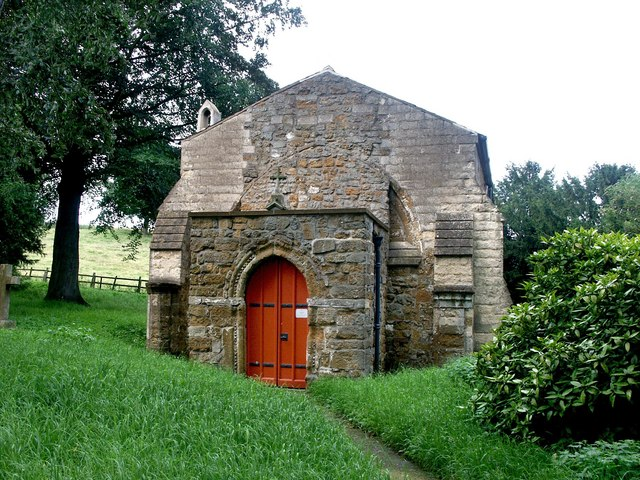
- Church of All Hallows, Clixby

- Location within Lincolnshire
- OS grid reference: TA102042
  - London: 140 mi (230 km) S
- Civil parish: Grasby
- District: West Lindsey
- Shire county: Lincolnshire
- Region: East Midlands
- Country: England
- Sovereign state: United Kingdom
- Post town: Market Rasen
- Postcode district: LN7
- Police: Lincolnshire
- Fire: Lincolnshire
- Ambulance: East Midlands
- UK Parliament: Gainsborough

Clixby is a small village and former civil parish, now in the parish of Grasby, in the West Lindsey district of Lincolnshire, England. It is situated approximately 2 miles (3 km) north from the town of Caistor, and lies in the Lincolnshire Wolds, a designated Area of Outstanding Natural Beauty. In 1931 the parish had a population of 39.

Clixby was formerly a township and chapelry in the parish of Caistor, in 1866 Clixby became a civil parish, on 1 April 1936 the parish was abolished and merged with Bishop Norton.

Clixby is listed in the 1086 Domesday Book, with Lord of the manor as King William I. At the beginning of the 18th century Clixby was the seat of Sir John Fitzwilliam.

The parish church was dedicated to All Hallows and dates from the 13th century with a 19th-century restoration by Hodgson Fowler. It was declared redundant in 1973.
