= North Barningham =

Hamlet in Norfolk, England

Coordinates: 52.88825°N 1.18998°E

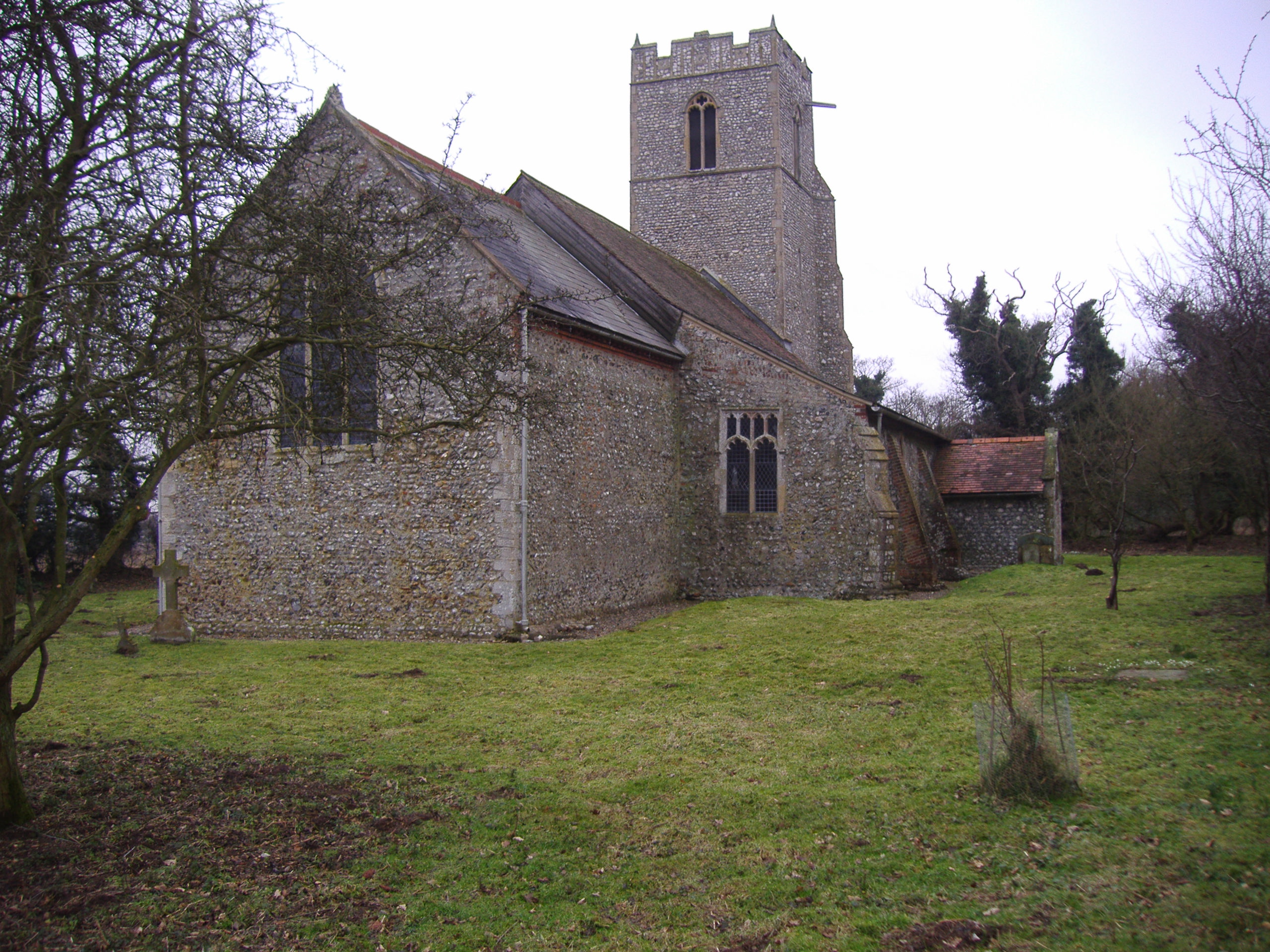
- St Peter's Church

- Location within Norfolk
- Population: 443 (parish, 2001 census)
- OS grid reference: TG 1471 3708
  - London: 138 miles (222 km)
- Civil parish: Matlask
- District: North Norfolk
- Shire county: Norfolk
- Region: East
- Country: England
- Sovereign state: United Kingdom
- Post town: NORWICH
- Postcode district: NR11
- Dialling code: 01263
- Police: Norfolk
- Fire: Norfolk
- Ambulance: East of England

North Barningham or Barningham Northwood or Barningham Norwood is a village in the civil parish of Matlask in the North Norfolk district, in the English county of Norfolk. The hamlet is 7 miles (11 km) south-west of Cromer, 23.2 miles (37.3 km) north-northwest of Norwich and 138 miles (222 km) north-northeast of London. The hamlet lies 4.6 miles (7.4 km) south of the town of Sheringham. The nearest railway station is at Sheringham for the Bittern Line which runs between Sheringham, Cromer and Norwich. The nearest airport is Norwich International Airport.

== Description ==
The village of North Barningham consists of a few scattered houses and farms, the church of Saint Peter and one remaining wing of a large H-shaped early-17th-century mansion, originally home to the Palgrave family. The hamlet is classed as a lost settlement. The name Barningham derive from the Old English for the Village of Beorn's people with the north part of the name added to differentiate it from others of the same name nearby. It is thought that Beorn was a Viking warlord who was given the land as a reward for his performance in battle.

== History ==
North Barningham has an entry in the Domesday Book of 1086, where its population, land ownership and productive resources were extensively detailed. In the great book North Barningham is recorded by the name of Berningeham. The main landholders were Thorold from William de Warenne, Roger Bigot, and Osferth from him. Then William de Noyers from Bishop William, Walter Giffard, and Drogen de Beuvriere.

On 1 April 1935 the parish was abolished and merged with Gresham. At the 1931 census (the last before the abolition of the parish), Barningham Norwood had a population of 36.

== Prominent buildings ==
=== Saint Peter's Church ===
The church of Saint Peter no longer holds regular services and is in the care of the Churches Conservation Trust. The church consists of a nave, chancel, north aisle, north porch and a west tower. It stands in the middle of a small churchyard with a hedge all around. The earliest parts of the building date back to 1100. Within the church there is a memorial to the Palgraves who had become the lords of the manor in the 15th century. The Palgraves lived in nearby North Barningham Hall. When Sir Richard Palgrave died without issue in 1732 the association with that branch of the family ended. The Windham family of nearby Felbrigg Hall purchased the hall and estate, demolishing part of the hall soon after. By 1745 there were only two inhabitants of the village left and the church fell into a state of disrepair. By 1886 the church had become out of use and continued to deteriorate until it was restored between 1893 and 1894. The church then saw a period of constant use in the early years of the 20th century but after a steady decline of services and attendance fell back into disuse. In 1969 in accordance with the Church of England pastoral measure, a petition went forward to have the church declared redundant. In 1973 bearers of the Palgrave surname organised a service on St Peter's Day. This was followed up by the formation of the Palgrave Society to carry out maintenance in the church and churchyard and also organise future services. By organising regular working parties and drawing attention to the historical importance of the church and its monuments it became clear that conservation was the only way forward so in October 1976 the church was officially vested in the redundant Churches Fund.

The main structure of the church is built from coursed flint with limestone quoins. The chancel and extension to the nave date from the early part of the 13th century. The north aisle was added in the 15th century and is separated from the nave by a four-bay arcade with octagonal shaped piers. The tower and north porch were added in the late 15th century. Within the tower there were once two bells. One was removed in 1669 when it was found to be cracked. The second was removed and transferred to Bawdeswell and installed in the new church there in the 1950s. Inside the church there are several memorials of note, the most impressive being to Sir Austin and Dame Elizabeth Palgrave which is located on the wall of the north aisle. In the sanctuary there is a monument to John Palgrave who died on 29 May 1611 who had been a prominent lawyer and a local magistrate in Norfolk. On the wall of the chancel there is a monument to Margaret Pope the wife of Dr John Pope of Over, Cambridgeshire. She was the daughter of John and Urith Palgrave. At the eastern end of the north aisle brasses set into a stone slab to commemorate Henry Palgrave who died in 1516.

The Palgrave Society continues its association with the church by arranging annual services and other events. It has published several monographs relating to the church, the family and the nearby hall. The official Guide to the Church was compiled by Derek Palgrave on behalf of the Churches Conservation Trust.

=== North Barningham Hall ===
North Barningham Hall or Barningham Norwood Hall was once owned by the Palgrave family. Today the hall is a fragment of a large mansion. What remains is one wing of an originally H-shaped house, probably of 1638; this house stood on an even older moated site. Among the various outbuildings in the grounds of the house, there is a 17th-century privy house and possibly some of the earliest foxhound kennels known to exist. The hall was in ruins for many years; it has been restored and is today a private residence.

== Gallery ==
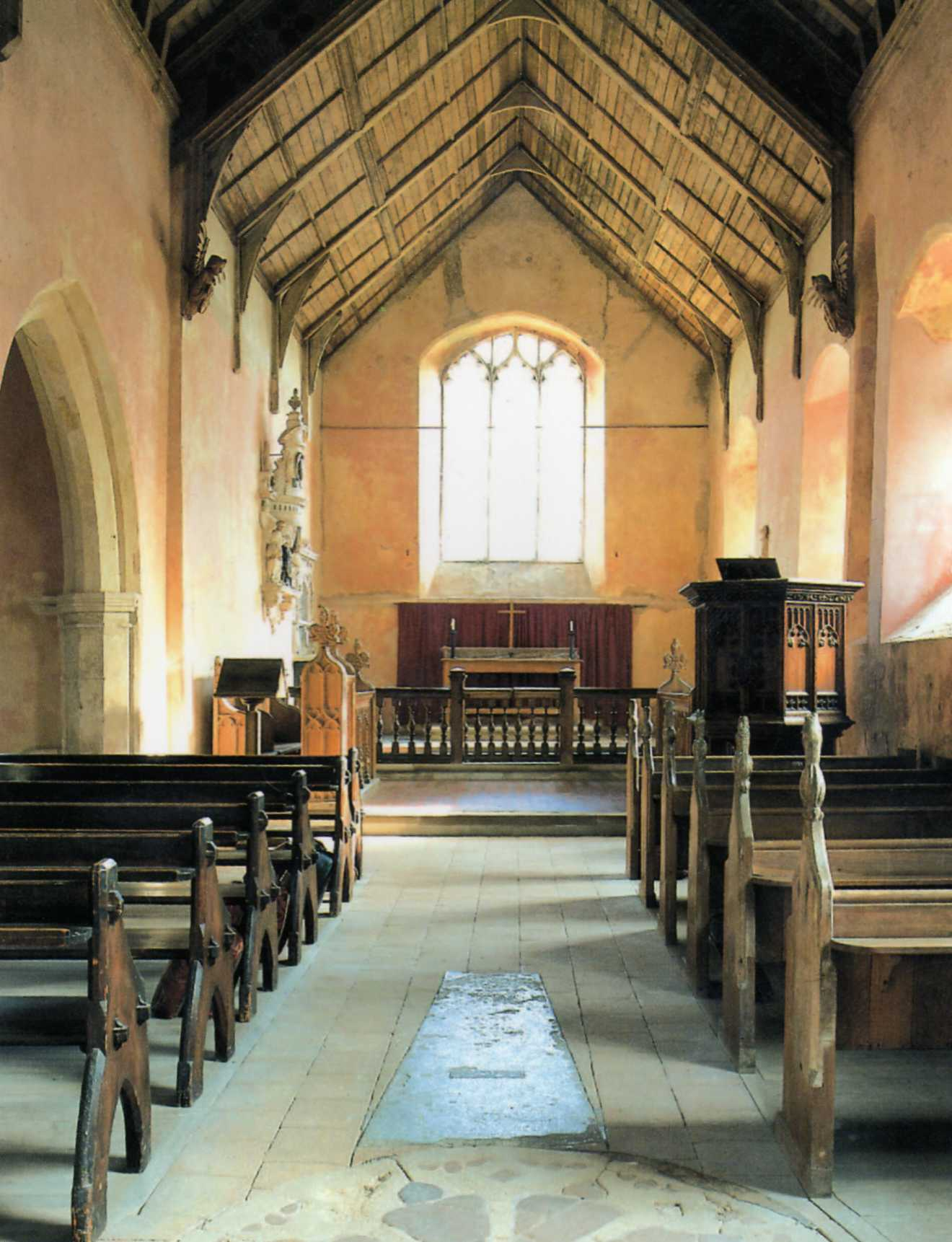
Interior of the church

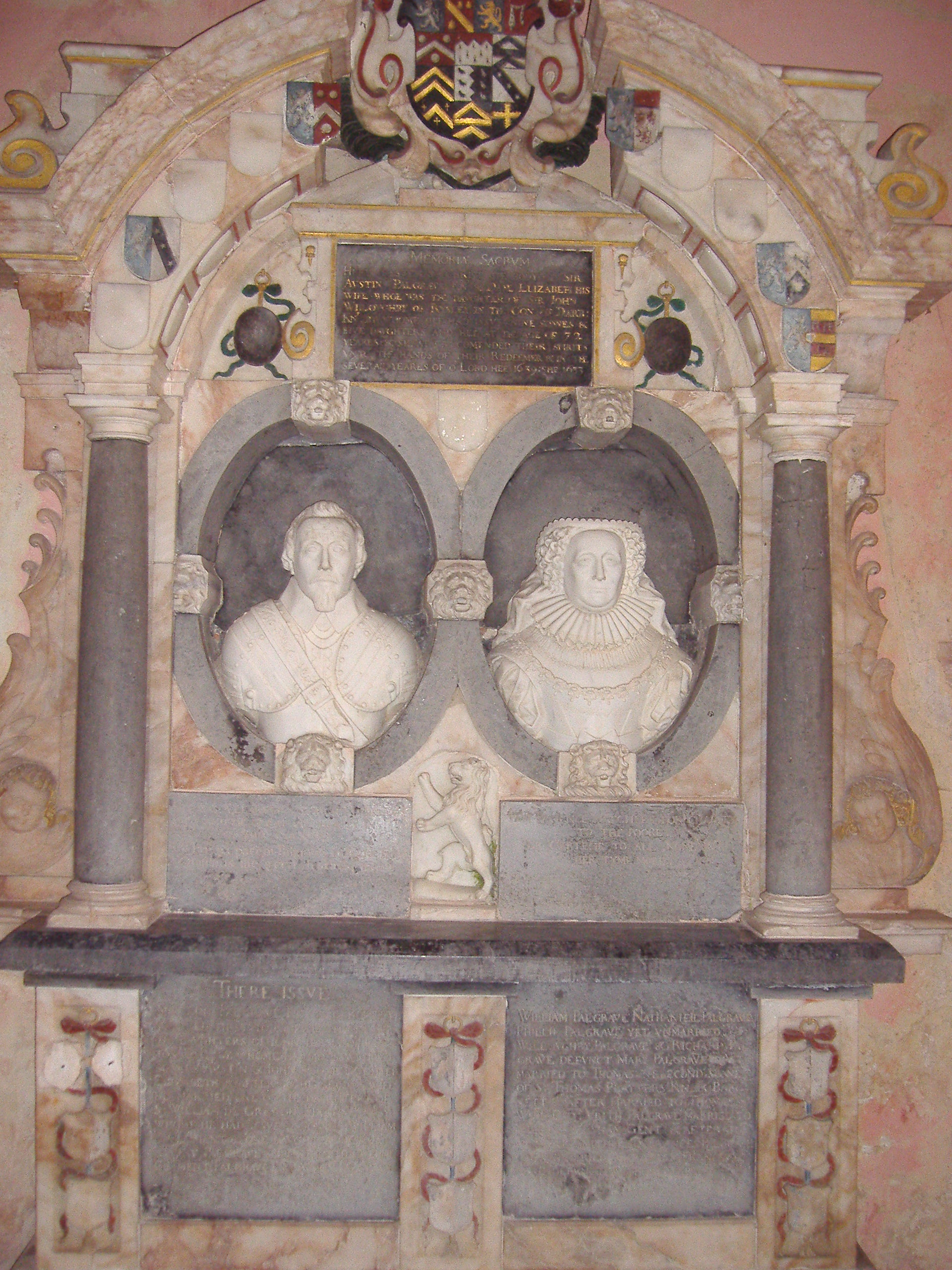
Palgrave Monument
