= Sapiston =

Village in Suffolk, England

Coordinates: 52.33957°N 0.8125°E

- Location within Suffolk
- Population: 164; 178 (2011)
- OS grid reference: TL917750
- District: West Suffolk
- Shire county: Suffolk
- Region: East
- Country: England
- Sovereign state: United Kingdom
- Post town: BURY ST EDMUNDS
- Postcode district: IP31
- Dialling code: 01284
- Police: Suffolk
- Fire: Suffolk
- Ambulance: East of England
- UK Parliament: Bury St Edmunds and Stowmarket

Sapiston is a small village and civil parish in the West Suffolk district of Suffolk in eastern England, located near the Suffolk-Norfolk border. It is in northern Suffolk lying on the river Blackbourn. The place-name 'Sapiston' is first attested in the Domesday Book of 1086, where it appears as Sapestuna. The name is thought to mean 'village of soapmakers', but this is not certain.

Sapiston is bordered to the south-west by Honington, to the north-west by Fakenham Magna, to the north by Euston, to the east by Bardwell, and to the south by Ixworth Thorpe. It is 8 miles from Bury St Edmunds and 6 miles from Thetford in Norfolk.

Also nearby are RAF Honington and two Joint RAF/USAF Bases, RAF Lakenheath and RAF Mildenhall.

== History ==
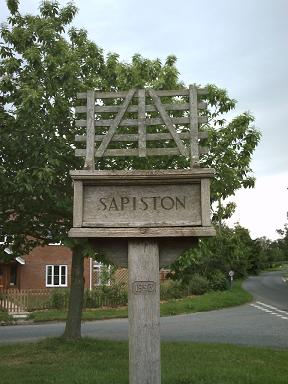
Sapiston's village sign

Sapiston, a parish in the hundred of Blackbourn, county Suffolk, 3½ miles N.W. of Ixworth, its post town, and 7 from Bury St. Edmund's. The village, which is of small extent, is situated on the River Blackbourn, a tributary of the River Little Ouse. It is wholly agricultural. The living is a perpetual curacy in the diocese of Ely, value £100. The church, dedicated to St. Andrew, is an ancient stone structure, with a thatched roof and a square embattled tower. The interior of the church contains a monument to the farmer William Austin, who resided here with his nephew, the poet Robert Bloomfield. There is a parochial school, erected by the Duke of Grafton, who is lord of the manor.

— From The National Gazetteer of Great Britain and Ireland (1868) (edited version)

Settled in the 1070s, one of the oldest references thus found of Sapiston is in the history of the Drurys, one of the oldest Suffolk families. Matilda, one of that family, married Henry de Sapiston to become Matilda de Sapiston around 1185.

Sapiston church dates back to the 12th century, (a little before the time of Matilda). It has not been in use since 1972 when the parishes of Sapiston and Honington were combined. The church is now maintained by the Churches Conservation Trust and, although Sapiston's church is redundant, occasional services are still held there.

The village was originally right by the ford across the Blackbourn (or Black Bourn). During the 14th century the entire village moved a few hundred yards north, possibly to escape from the Black Death. Now only the Church of St Andrew and The Grange farmhouse remain at the village’s original location.

It was in Sapiston that the Suffolk poet Robert Bloomfield, author of "The Farmer's Boy" (1800), worked from the age of ten to the age of fifteen. He was a farm labourer on the farm of his uncle William Austin (who is buried in Sapiston churchyard). Bloomfield was born in nearby Honington, and the church there contains a memorial to the poet, as well as many notes from admirers.

The local lord of the manor was the Duke of Grafton in neighbouring Euston, Suffolk. The first Duke of Grafton, previously Earl of Euston, was Henry Fitzroy, the son of King Charles II. The third Duke of Grafton was briefly Prime Minister. The current Duke of Grafton is the 12th.

=== About Sapiston ===
Village Life & Folk Remembered, a book by Syd Thurlow, was written detailing many local stories about Honington & Sapiston. Here's what the Gazetteer of Suffolk had to say about it in 1855. Kelly's Directory of Suffolk described it like this in 1912.

=== Dad's Army ===
This sleepy part of Suffolk proved to be an ideal filming location for the 1970s British TV show Dad's Army. In common with much of the surrounding area, Sapiston and Honington were used for part of the series, in particular the episode "Dads Army Things that go Bump in the Night".

David Croft, the director/producer of Dad's Army, 'Allo 'Allo!, Are You Being Served?, Hi-de-Hi!, etc. lived in Honington.
