= Heckingham =

Village in Norfolk, England

Coordinates: 52.53473°N 1.51668°E

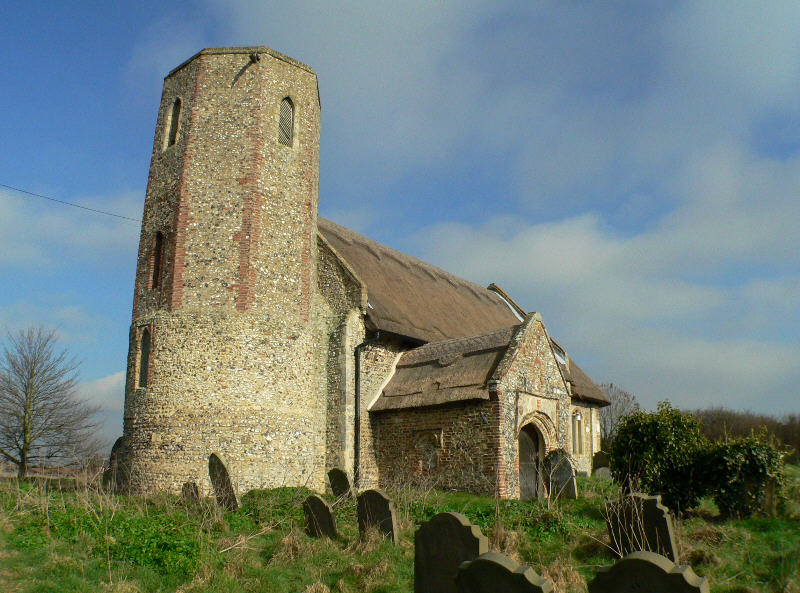
- St Gregory's Church

- Location within Norfolk
- Area: 1.72 sq mi (4.5 km^{2})
- Population: 245
  - Density: 142/sq mi (55/km^{2})
- OS grid reference: TM385987
- Civil parish: Heckingham
- District: South Norfolk
- Shire county: Norfolk
- Region: East
- Country: England
- Sovereign state: United Kingdom
- Post town: NORWICH
- Postcode district: NR14
- Dialling code: 01508
- UK Parliament: South Norfolk

Heckingham is a village and civil parish in the English county of Norfolk.

Heckingham is located 1.5 miles (2.4 km) east of Loddon and 11 miles (18 km) south-east of Norwich, along the course of the River Chet.

== History ==
Heckingham's name is of Anglo-Saxon origin and derives from the Old English for the hamlet of Hecca's people.

In the Domesday Book, Heckingham is listed as a settlement of 54 households in the hundred of Clavering. In 1086, the village was divided between the estates of Roger Bigod, Godric the Steward and St Edmunds Abbey.

Between 1764 and 1767, a workhouse was built in Heckingham which was later used as a hospital. In 1766, a pest house was built nearby by John Harris of Ipswich for the afflicted.

== Geography ==
According to the 2021 census, Heckingham has a total population of 245 people which demonstrates an increase from the 179 people listed in the 2011 census.

Heckingham is located along the course of the River Chet.

== St. Gregory's Church ==
Heckingham's parish church is dedicated for Saint Gregory and dates from the Twelfth Century. St. Gregory's is located within the village on Church Lane and has been Grade I listed since 1960. The church is no longer open for Sunday services and is in the care of Churches Conservation Trust.

St. Gregory's features an Eleventh Century font and several medieval monuments and memorials.

== Governance ==
Heckingham is part of the electoral ward of Loddon & Chedgrave for local elections and is part of the district of South Norfolk.

The village's national constituency is South Norfolk which has been represented by the Labour's Ben Goldsborough MP since 2024.

== War Memorial ==
Heckingham War Memorial is shared with nearby Hales and is a rough-hewn Celtic cross on Yarmouth Road. The memorial was damaged in a car accident in 1999 and was subsequently restored. The memorial lists the following names for the First World War:

Rank	Name	Unit	Date of death	Burial/Commemoration
Capt.	Henry de Grey	4th Royal Irish Dragoon Guards	20 Nov. 1917	Ribécourt Cemetery
LCpl.	Frank Smith	9th Bn., Suffolk Regiment	13 Sep. 1916	Thiepval Memorial
Pte.	George E. W. Tills	11th (WA) Bn., AIF	13 Oct. 1915	Beach Cemetery
Pte.	James E. Batchelder	9th Bn., Norfolk Regiment	15 Apr. 1918	Tyne Cot

The following names were added after the Second World War:

Rank	Name	Unit	Date of death	Burial/Commemoration
Pte.	Claud H. Colchester	4th Bn., Royal Norfolk Regiment	21 Sep. 1944	Kranji War Memorial
Spr.	Robert S. Moore	Royal Engineers	27 Dec. 1940	St. Gregory's Churchyard

== See also ==
- Clavering hundred
