= Great Steeping =

Village and civil parish in the East Lindsey district of Lincolnshire, England

Coordinates: 53.156949°N 0.151628°E

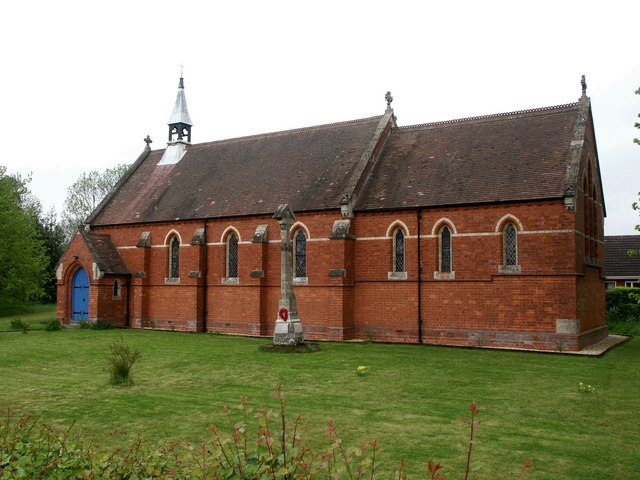
- All Saints' Church, Great Steeping

- Location within Lincolnshire
- Population: 297 (2011 census)
- OS grid reference: TF439643
  - London: 110 mi (180 km) S
- Civil parish: Great Steeping
- District: East Lindsey
- Shire county: Lincolnshire
- Region: East Midlands
- Country: England
- Sovereign state: United Kingdom
- Post town: Spilsby
- Postcode district: PE23
- Police: Lincolnshire
- Fire: Lincolnshire
- Ambulance: East Midlands
- UK Parliament: Boston and Skegness

Great Steeping is a village and civil parish in the East Lindsey district of Lincolnshire, England. It is situated approximately 3 miles (5 km) from Spilsby. The parish includes the hamlet of Monksthorpe.

There are two churches dedicated to All Saints, one being redundant and now known as Old All Saints.

Old All Saints, built in 1748 on the site of a medieval church, and restored in 1908, is a Grade II* listed building. The Diocese of Lincoln declared it redundant in August 1973. In the grounds is the socket stone of a medieval churchyard cross which is an ancient scheduled monument.

All Saints’ Church was built of red brick in 1891, after a design by William Bassett-Smith. It is Grade II listed, and has a listed churchyard cross.

Great Steeping Primary School was built in 1859, and later run by the Great Steeping School Board from 1876 to 1903 as Great Steeping Board School.

Kelsey Hall dates from 1854 but occupies the site of an earlier manor house which burnt down. It is first noted in 1507 as "Kelsayhall" and its name derives from the Kelsey family associated with Great Steeping. Old documents refer to "William de Kellessay in Steping" in 1299, and Ralph de Kelsay in 1327. Kelsey Hall is a private house.

Great Steeping was also the base for RAF Spilsby, which originally was to be on the site of Gunby Park. However, after an appeal by Field Marshal Sir Archibald Montgomery-Massingberd of Gunby Hall to the King, the RAF Steeping airfield was built as RAF Spilsby. It opened in September 1943, and in 1944 RAF Spilsby, RAF Strubby, and RAF East Kirkby joined to become the newly formed 55 Base with headquarters at East Kirkby. In September 1944 RAF Spilsby became a station for two Lancaster squadrons, the 207 and 44. It was taken over by No 2 Armament Practice School from 1945 until November 1946, after which the station was placed on care and maintenance until 1955. It re-opened to host ground units of the USAF until they moved out in 1958.
