= Feltwell =

Village in Norfolk, England

Coordinates: 52.486°N 0.519°E

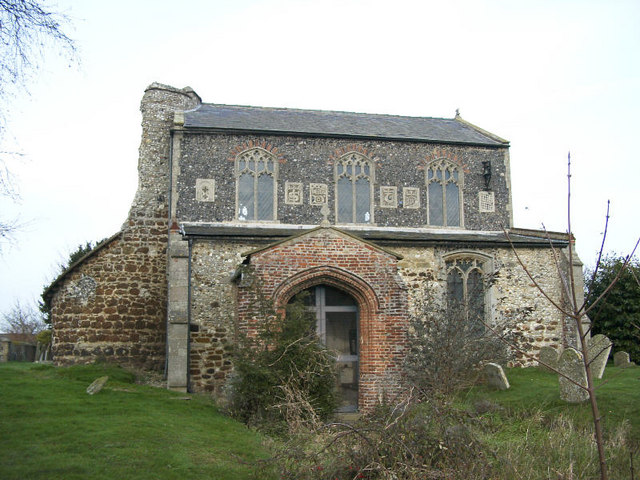
- St Nicholas Church, Feltwell

- Location within Norfolk
- Area: 20.14 sq mi (52.2 km^{2})
- Population: 3,112 (2021 census)
  - Density: 155/sq mi (60/km^{2})
- OS grid reference: TL711905
- Civil parish: Feltwell
- District: King's Lynn and West Norfolk
- Shire county: Norfolk
- Region: East
- Country: England
- Sovereign state: United Kingdom
- Post town: Thetford
- Postcode district: IP26
- Dialling code: 01842
- Police: Norfolk
- Fire: Norfolk
- Ambulance: East of England
- UK Parliament: South West Norfolk

Feltwell is a village and civil parish in the English county of Norfolk. It is 11 miles (18 km) north-west of Thetford and 34 miles (55 km) south-west of Norwich on the western border of the county where it meets Cambridgeshire.

== History ==
Feltwell's name is of Anglo-Saxon origin. There is evidence of Roman settlement in the parish, including two villas and two bathhouses. In the Domesday Book, it is listed as a settlement of 124 residents in the hundred of Grimshoe. In 1086, the village was divided between the East Anglian estates of William the Conqueror, William de Warenne and the Abbey of St Etheldreda, Ely.

In August 1382 the poet John Gower purchased the manors of Feltwell in Norfolk and Moulton in Suffolk. They were then granted to Thomas Blakelake, parson of St Nicholas's, Feltwell, and others, at a rent of £40 annually for his life.

In 1944, an Avro Lancaster of No. 15 Squadron RAF crashed in the parish after a training flight from RAF Mildenhall, the crash site was excavated by the Anglian Aeronautical Preservation Society in 1982.

== Geography ==
According to the 2021 census, Feltwell has a population of 3,112 people which shows an increase from the 2,825 people listed in the 2011 census. The parish is large, with an area of 20.14 square miles (52.2 km^{2}), and extends 5 miles (8.0 km) west of the village of Feltwell to the county border with Cambridgeshire marked by the River Little Ouse. The hamlet of Brandon Bank along the river is split between the two counties, with the church of St John Little Ouse located on the Cambridgeshire side of the river in Littleport parish.

The village of Feltwell sits along the B1112 between Stoke Ferry and Icklingham and the River Little Ouse.

== Religion ==
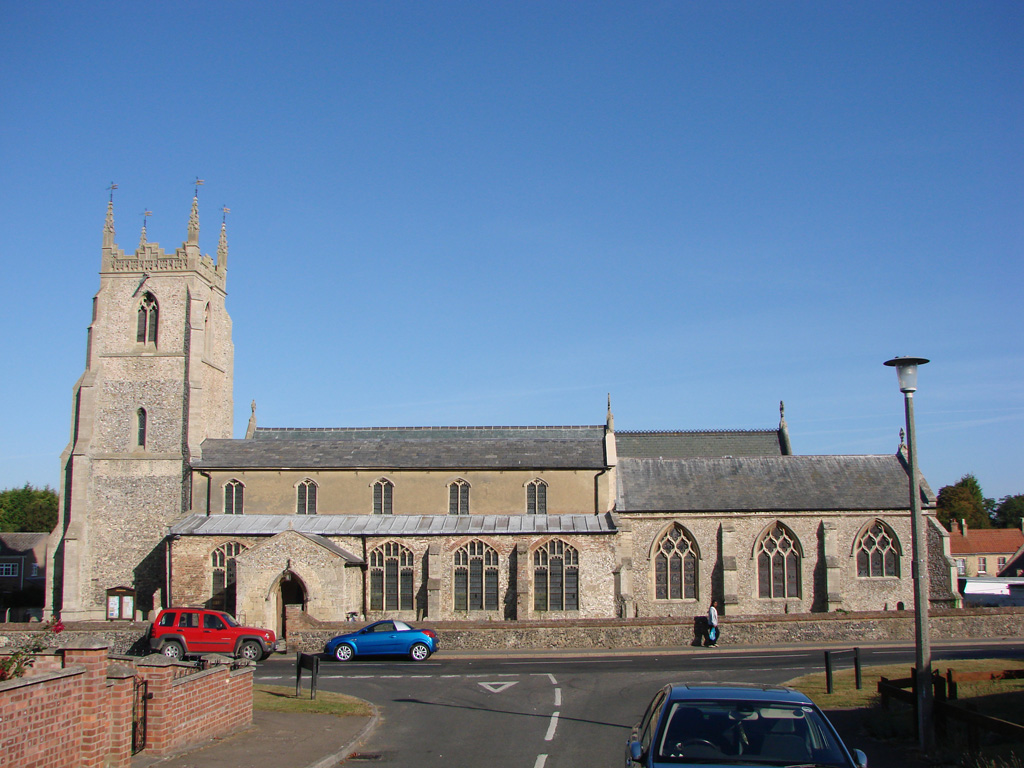
The Church of St Mary, Feltwell

St. Nicholas Church is a redundant church in the care of the Churches Conservation Trust. It is a Grade I listed building. St. Nicholas' is located within the village on Hythe Road. The church was largely rebuilt in the nineteenth century, after the collapse of the tower in 1898, under the direction of Frederick Preedy and was used for Catholic Mass during the Second World War for prisoners of war.

Feltwell's active Church of England parish church, St Mary's, is also a Grade I listed building. It largely dates from the fifteenth century and was built after the site of earlier worship was severely damaged by fire. St Mary's displays East Anglia's finest examples of French stained-glass installed by the Parisian workshops of Édouard Didron and Eugene Oudinot in the nineteenth century. The church was extended in the late-nineteenth century under the oversight of Frederick Preedy. Among the memorials in the church is one to Lt-Col. Edward G. Hibbert of the Grenadier Guards, a veteran of the Crimean War and the Battles of Alma, Inkerman and Sevastopol.

A primitive Methodist chapel was built at Brandon Bank on the Norfolk side of the River Little Ouse.

== RAF Feltwell ==
RAF Feltwell opened in 1937 for use by the Royal Air Force and, during the Second World War was the base for Vickers Wellingtons of No. 37, No. 57 and No. 75 Squadrons RAF. After the war, PGM-17 Thor ballistic missiles were based at the airfield which was later leased to the United States Air Force. Today, RAF Feltwell is used as an accommodation estate for Americans based at RAF Mildenhall. The base is notable for its three radomes, resembling giant golf balls..

== Amenities ==
Feltwell Primary School is named after Edmund Moundeford, a seventeenth-century Feltwell resident and politician. The village has a public house which dates from the eighteenth century and has also been used as a shop, off-licence, restaurant, and a wine-bar. The Chequers closed in 2017 having stood on its site since the eighteenth century.

The village is also home to: a doctors surgery and pharmacy, a veterinarian practice, a garage and service station, and a number of other businesses.

== Notable people ==
- John Gower (c. 1330 – 1408) poet, lord of the manor of Feltwell.
- Edmund Moundeford (1596–1643) politician, died in Feltwell.
