= St Margaret's Church, Hales =

Coordinates: 52.5106°N 1.5111°E

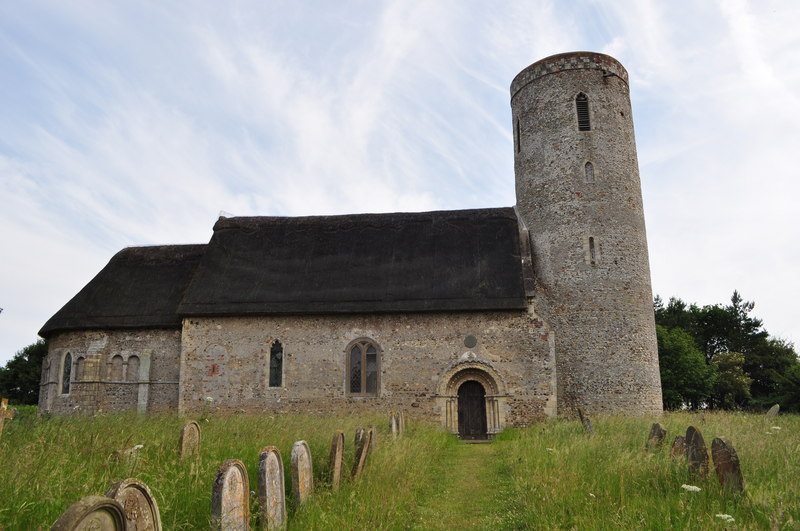
- St Margaret's Church, Hales, from the north

- Location in Norfolk
- OS grid reference: TM 384 962
- Location: Hales, Norfolk
- Country: England
- Denomination: Anglican
- Website: Churches Conservation Trust

History
- Dedication: Saint Margaret

Architecture
- Functional status: Redundant
- Heritage designation: Grade I
- Designated: 5 September 1960
- Architectural type: Church
- Style: Norman

Specifications
- Materials: Flint, brick and conglomerate, with some rendering, limestone dressings, thatched roofs

St Margaret's Church is a redundant Anglican church in the village of Hales, Norfolk, England. It is recorded in the National Heritage List for England as a designated Grade I listed building, and is under the care of the Churches Conservation Trust. The church stands in open fields to the south of the village and to the east of the A146 road.

== History ==
St Margaret's was built in the 12th century and, other than the addition of windows in the 13th and 14th centuries, it remains almost intact. With its round tower, semicircular apse, and thatched roof, it is described as "an almost perfect Norman church". The church was controlled by St Olave's Priory until the Dissolution of the Monasteries in the 16th century.

== Architecture ==
=== Exterior ===
The church is constructed in flint, brick and conglomerate, some of which has been rendered. The dressings are in limestone, and the roof is thatch. Its plan consists of a nave, a chancel with an apse, and a west tower. The tower is round, and dates possibly back to the 11th century. In the lower part of the tower are small lancet windows, and around the upper part are single-light bell openings. The parapet is decorated with brick, flint and limestone chequerwork. The south doorway has two orders of shafts, and its arch is decorated with zigzags. In the south wall of the nave are two two-light windows containing Y-tracery, and between them is a blocked round-headed window, partly cut by a later lancet which is also blocked. Around the apsidal chancel are round-headed blind arcades in pairs, in some places pierced by lancets. Between the arcades are pilaster buttresses. The east window has a pointed arch, and two lights with Y-tracery. The north wall contains a blocked round-headed window pierced with a lancet, which is also blocked, a single-light window, and a two-light window with Y-tracery. The north doorway is more ornate than the south, also with two orders of shafts, but six orders in the arch and more detailed decoration.

=== Interior ===
The nave has a 19th-century waggon roof; the chancel has a plain plaster vault. In the chancel there are niches on each side of the east window, and a recess for an aumbry in the north wall. The chancel floor contains two memorial slabs. In the nave is an arch leading to the stairway to a former rood screen. At the west end of the nave is a gallery. The tower arch is semicircular, and in the tower are two blocked round-headed windows. The octagonal font dates from the 15th century. Around the stem are carvings of four lions, the bowl is supported by corbels carved with angels, and the faces of the bowl are decorated alternatively with Tudor roses and with angels holding shields. On the nave walls are the remnants of wall paintings. One of these is of Saint James the Great holding a staff, and another fragment depicts Saint Christopher carrying the Christ child. Above the chancel arch are depictions of two angels, and around the upper part of the chancel wall runs a painted frieze.

== See also ==
- List of churches preserved by the Churches Conservation Trust in the East of England
