= Godric the Steward =

11th and 12th-century English royal official

Godric or Godric the Steward or Godric dapifer (died c. 1114) was an Englishman around the time of the Norman Conquest.

Godric was a native Englishman who was the dapifer, or steward, of the Earl of East Anglia, Ralph de Gael. Godric may have been a relative of the earl's.

Godric is listed in Domesday Book as administering some royal lands in Norfolk and Suffolk, some of which were lands formerly held by Ralph before the earl's participation in the Revolt of the Earls and subsequent loss of all his English landholdings. Godric is also listed in Domesday Book as holding lands in his own right. Godric was one of only 13 tenants-in-chief who were English listed in Domesday Book.

Godric served King William II of England as a steward also. The historian Frank Barlow states that he held the office of Sheriff of Suffolk, but the historian Judith Green only gives him as probably sheriff of Suffolk around 1087. Green also states that Godric may have been Sheriff of Norfolk at least part of the time between 1091 and 1100.

Godric was married to a woman named Ingreda. The marriage had at least one son, named Ralph. Ingreda may have been the daughter of Edwin, whose lands Godric held in 1086. A further piece of evidence suggesting that Edwin is Ingreda's father is that Edwin was married to a woman named Ingreda. Charters of St Benet's Abbey state that Godric's son Ralph had a brother named Eudo and a nephew named Lisewy, but it is not clear how these two individuals were related to Godric.

Godric died around 1114.
