= Grasby =

Village in Lincolnshire, England

Coordinates: 53.529953°N 0.358874°W

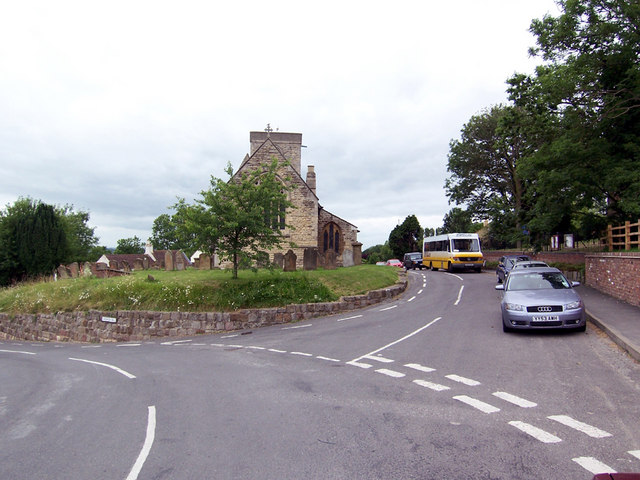
- All Saints' Church, Grasby

- Location within Lincolnshire
- Population: 480 (2011)
- OS grid reference: TA088049
  - London: 140 mi (230 km) S
- District: West Lindsey
- Shire county: Lincolnshire
- Region: East Midlands
- Country: England
- Sovereign state: United Kingdom
- Post town: BARNETBY
- Postcode district: DN38
- Dialling code: 01652
- Police: Lincolnshire
- Fire: Lincolnshire
- Ambulance: East Midlands
- UK Parliament: Gainsborough

Grasby is a small village and civil parish in the West Lindsey district of Lincolnshire, England. The population of the civil parish (including Clixby) taken at the 2011 census was 480. It is situated 3 miles (5 km) north-west of the town of Caistor and lies in the Lincolnshire Wolds, a designated Area of Outstanding Natural Beauty.

Grasby's 13th-century Anglican parish church, dedicated to All Saints, is opposite the village primary school.

The church is part of the Caistor group of parishes in the Deanery of West Wold. The 2013 incumbent is The Rev'd Canon Ian Robinson. In earlier times the vicar was Rev Charles Tennyson Turner, brother of the poet Alfred Lord Tennyson.

The village school came close to closing at the end of the 20th century but remains open. It is now Grasby All Saints Church of England Primary School, and grant maintained. The school received a Grade 2 (Good) judgement for "Overall effectiveness" in its 2013 Ofsted report.

The village hall holds events such as Rock and Roll and Jive classes, runs a Learn Direct programme and is used by the village school for physical education lessons and a yearly Easter ceremony.

Grasby has one public house, The Cross Keys, on the Caistor to Brigg road, which for a time housed a village shop. A second public house, The Bluebell, on the corner of Church Hill and Canty Nook, is now closed.

Since 1987 Grasby has been twinned with the small French village of Saint-Rémy-de-Sillé in Sarthe, whose main road has been renamed Rue de Grasby.

In 2005 Grasby won the Central England Village of the Year competition.
