= Grade I listed buildings in South Norfolk =

There are over 9,000 Grade I listed buildings in England. This page is a list of these buildings in the district of South Norfolk in Norfolk.

== South Norfolk ==
Name	Location	Type	Completed (Note: The date given is the date used by Historic England as significant for the initial building or that of an important part in the structure's description.)	Date designated	Grid ref. (Note: The grid reference is based on the British national grid reference system, sometimes known as OSGB36, used by the Ordnance Survey.) Geo-coordinates	Entry number (Note: The "List Entry Number" is a unique number assigned to each listed building and scheduled monument by Historic England.)	Image
Church of All Saints	Alburgh	Parish Church	14th century	7 December 1959	TM2707987286; 52°26′11″N 1°20′21″E	1373533	Church of All Saints More images
Church of St Mary	Aldeby	Parish Church	12th century	5 September 1960	TM4504693310; 52°28′58″N 1°36′27″E	1050600	Church of St Mary More images
Church of All Saints	Ashwellthorpe, Ashwellthorpe and Fundenhall	Tower	Late 13th century	7 December 1959	TM1467997680; 52°32′05″N 1°09′50″E	1170251	Church of All Saints More images
Church of St Nicholas	Fundenhall, Ashwellthorpe and Fundenhall	Tower	12th century	7 December 1959	TM1526196890; 52°31′38″N 1°10′19″E	1306126	Church of St Nicholas More images
Church of St Michael	Aslacton	Church	11th century	7 December 1959	TM1563491092; 52°28′30″N 1°10′25″E	1170344	Church of St Michael More images
Church of St Peter and St Paul	Barnham Broom	Parish Church	15th century	26 November 1959	TG0822907787; 52°37′40″N 1°04′31″E	1050739	Church of St Peter and St Paul More images
The Old Hall	Barnham Broom	Manor House	16th century	2 October 1951	TG0787808050; 52°37′49″N 1°04′13″E	1373037	The Old Hall More images
Church of St Mary and St Walstan	Bawburgh	Church	12th century	26 November 1959	TG1527008635; 52°37′58″N 1°10′47″E	1050778	Church of St Mary and St Walstan More images
Church of St Andrew	Crow Hill, Bedingham	Parish Church	12th century	5 September 1960	TM2851193397; 52°29′26″N 1°21′52″E	1050605	Church of St Andrew More images
Church of All Saints	Hethel, Bracon Ash	Parish Church	11th century	26 November 1959	TG1711300398; 52°33′29″N 1°12′05″E	1050688	Church of All Saints More images
Church of St Nicholas	Bracon Ash	Parish Church	Medieval	26 November 1959	TG1795000194; 52°33′21″N 1°12′49″E	1050695	Church of St Nicholas More images
Church of St Andrew	Fersfield, Bressingham	Tower	c. 1300	7 December 1959	TM0656082827; 52°24′16″N 1°02′07″E	1049662	Church of St Andrew More images
Church of St John the Baptist	Bressingham	Church	Late 13th century	7 December 1959	TM0760480754; 52°23′08″N 1°02′57″E	1373587	Church of St John the Baptist More images
Church of All Saints	Thorpe Abbotts, Brockdish	Church	13th century	26 June 1981	TM1876278903; 52°21′52″N 1°12′42″E	1049636	Church of All Saints More images
Church of St Peter and St Paul	Brockdish	Tower	1864	7 December 1959	TM2044279617; 52°22′13″N 1°14′12″E	1373573	Church of St Peter and St Paul More images
Church of St Michael	Broome	Parish Church	14th century	5 September 1960	TM3466193171; 52°29′09″N 1°27′17″E	1373130	Church of St Michael More images
Church of St Michael	Bunwell	Church	15th century	7 December 1959	TM1255492767; 52°29′29″N 1°07′46″E	1373605	Church of St Michael More images
Church of St George	Shimpling, Burston and Shimpling	Church	Late 13th century	7 December 1959	TM1562482641; 52°23′57″N 1°10′05″E	1171296	Church of St George More images
Church of All Saints	Carleton Rode	Church	Late 13th century	7 December 1959	TM1148692512; 52°29′22″N 1°06′49″E	1305560	Church of All Saints More images
Church of All Saints	Chedgrave	Parish Church	12th century	5 September 1960	TM3632499370; 52°32′27″N 1°29′01″E	1050520	Church of All Saints More images
Church of St Andrew	Claxton	Parish Church	12th century	5 September 1960	TG3278903192; 52°34′36″N 1°26′03″E	1373099	Church of St Andrew More images
Church of St Edmund	Costessey	Church	14th century	26 November 1959	TG1771812452; 52°39′58″N 1°13′06″E	1305980	Church of St Edmund More images
Church of St Mary	Denton	Church	Late 13th century	7 December 1959	TM2862587345; 52°26′10″N 1°21′43″E	1373626	Church of St Mary More images
Church of St Andrew	Deopham	Parish Church	Late 14th century to Early 16th century	26 November 1959	TG0497900474; 52°33′48″N 1°01′22″E	1373039	Church of St Andrew More images
Church of All Saints	Dickleburgh	Church	14th century	7 December 1959	TM1677982423; 52°23′49″N 1°11′06″E	1373199	Church of All Saints More images
Church of St Mary	Rushall	Church	13th century	7 December 1959	TM1976882652; 52°23′52″N 1°13′44″E	1050387	Church of St Mary More images
Church of St Mary	Diss	Parish Church	14th century	29 December 1950	TM1172680021; 52°22′38″N 1°06′33″E	1049757	Church of St Mary More images
Church of St Mary	Ditchingham	Parish Church	15th century	5 September 1960	TM3298292222; 52°28′41″N 1°25′46″E	1050612	Church of St Mary More images
Ditchingham Hall	Ditchingham Park, Ditchingham	Country House	c. 1715	25 September 1951	TM3205092702; 52°28′58″N 1°24′58″E	1153041	Ditchingham Hall More images
Church of All Saints	Earsham	Church	Norman	7 December 1959	TM3260188801; 52°26′51″N 1°25′17″E	1050403	Church of All Saints More images
Soane's Music Room at North-east Corner of the Wilderness North of Earsham Hall	Earsham	Railings	1784	7 December 1959	TM3072190034; 52°27′34″N 1°23′41″E	1152446	Soane's Music Room at North-east Corner of the Wilderness North of Earsham Hall More images
Church of St. Peter	Easton	Church	Late 12th century	26 November 1959	TG1300410968; 52°39′16″N 1°08′52″E	1305921	Church of St. Peter More images
Church of St Mary	Ellingham	Parish Church	Medieval	5 September 1960	TM3663891848; 52°28′24″N 1°28′58″E	1153134	Church of St Mary More images
Rainthorpe Hall including Garden Wall with Gate and Gate Piers	Flordon	Country House	1503	2 October 1951	TM2026697144; 52°31′39″N 1°14′45″E	1050699	Rainthorpe Hall including Garden Wall with Gate and Gate Piers More images
Church of St Mary	Forncett St Mary, Forncett	Church	13th century	7 December 1959	TM1662593837; 52°29′58″N 1°11′24″E	1304627	Church of St Mary More images
Church of St Peter	Forncett St Peter, Forncett	Church	14th century	7 December 1959	TM1649492826; 52°29′25″N 1°11′15″E	1152619	Church of St Peter More images
Church of St Andrew	Framingham Earl	Church	11th century	26 November 1959	TG2774702754; 52°34′30″N 1°21′35″E	1373174	Church of St Andrew More images
Church of St Mary	Gillingham	Parish Church	12th century	5 September 1960	TM4115792261; 52°28′30″N 1°32′58″E	1050580	Church of St Mary More images
Church of St Mary	Gissing	Church	Late 11th century	7 December 1959	TM1462785296; 52°25′25″N 1°09′18″E	1152891	Church of St Mary More images
Church of St Mary	Haddiscoe	Parish Church	11th century	5 September 1960	TM4393196897; 52°30′55″N 1°35′37″E	1169126	Church of St Mary More images
Church of St Matthias	Haddiscoe Thorpe, Haddiscoe	Parish Church	1661	5 September 1960	TM4359798097; 52°31′34″N 1°35′23″E	1306674	Church of St Matthias More images
Church of St Margaret	Hales	Parish Church	12th century	5 September 1960	TM3835196104; 52°30′38″N 1°30′40″E	1169239	Church of St Margaret More images
Church of St Margaret	Hapton	Tower	1848	7 December 1959	TM1761196674; 52°31′28″N 1°12′23″E	1179227	Church of St Margaret More images
Church of St Gregory	Heckingham	Parish Church	12th century	5 September 1960	TM3843798845; 52°32′07″N 1°30′52″E	1169302	Church of St Gregory More images
Church of St Peter	Hedenham	Church	14th century	5 September 1960	TM3120993387; 52°29′22″N 1°24′15″E	1304292	Church of St Peter More images
Hedenham Hall	Hedenham	Country House	Late 16th century	25 September 1951	TM3124992785; 52°29′02″N 1°24′16″E	1373118	Hedenham Hall More images
Church of St John the Baptist	Hellington	Parish Church	12th century	5 September 1960	TG3134403058; 52°34′34″N 1°24′46″E	1169361	Church of St John the Baptist More images
Church of St Margaret	Hempnall	Tower	Early 14th century	7 December 1959	TM2412194454; 52°30′07″N 1°18′02″E	1050328	Church of St Margaret More images
Church of St. Andrew	Hingham	Parish Church	1319-59	26 November 1959	TG0218002125; 52°34′46″N 0°58′57″E	1051162	Church of St. Andrew More images
Church of All Saints	Kirby Cane	Parish Church	Medieval	5 September 1960	TM3737294170; 52°29′37″N 1°29′43″E	1153564	Church of All Saints More images
Kirstead Hall	Kirstead	Country House	Early 17th century	5 September 1960	TM2960898680; 52°32′15″N 1°23′03″E	1170485	Kirstead Hall More images
Church of St Margaret Hardley	Langley with Hardley	Parish Church	12th century	5 September 1960	TG3853400730; 52°33′08″N 1°31′02″E	1050636	Church of St Margaret Hardley More images
Church of St Michael	Langley, Langley with Hardley	Parish Church	14th century	5 September 1960	TG3550500931; 52°33′19″N 1°28′22″E	1373104	Church of St Michael More images
Former Western Range to Langley Abbey	Langley Green, Langley with Hardley	Abbey	13th century	25 September 1951	TG3624302852; 52°34′20″N 1°29′06″E	1373102	Former Western Range to Langley Abbey
Langley Abbey Remains	Langley Green, Langley with Hardley	Abbey	1195 or later	25 September 1951	TG3628002854; 52°34′20″N 1°29′08″E	1050634	Langley Abbey Remains More images
Langley Park School	Langley Park, Langley with Hardley	Country House	c. 1740	25 September 1951	TG3512900661; 52°33′11″N 1°28′01″E	1306509	Langley Park School More images
Barn South of Hales Hall	Hales Green, Loddon	Barn	Late 15th century	25 September 1951	TM3691096007; 52°30′38″N 1°29′23″E	1373161	Upload Photo
Church of Holy Trinity	Loddon	Parish Church	Late 15th century	5 September 1960	TM3634298724; 52°32′06″N 1°29′00″E	1373159	Church of Holy Trinity More images
Hales Hall	Hales Green, Loddon	Country House	Late 15th century	25 September 1951	TM3694996080; 52°30′40″N 1°29′26″E	1169558	Hales Hall More images
Church of St Mary	Long Stratton	Parish Church	12th century	7 December 1959	TM1968592268; 52°29′03″N 1°14′02″E	1304232	Church of St Mary More images
Church of St Michael	Stratton St Michael, Long Stratton	Bell Tower	14th century	26 June 1981	TM2057693607; 52°29′45″N 1°14′53″E	1304267	Church of St Michael More images
Morley Old Hall	Morley	House	c. 1600	2 October 1951	TM0558398388; 52°32′40″N 1°01′49″E	1050714	Morley Old Hall More images
Church of St Catherine	Fritton, Morning Thorpe	Church	12th century	7 December 1959	TM2275193285; 52°29′31″N 1°16′47″E	1373281	Church of St Catherine More images
Church of St John the Baptist	Morning Thorpe	Church	14th century	7 December 1959	TM2184492556; 52°29′09″N 1°15′57″E	1154001	Church of St John the Baptist More images
Church of St Peter	Mundham	Parish Church	12th century	5 September 1960	TM3248498024; 52°31′50″N 1°25′34″E	1305975	Church of St Peter More images
Church of St Peter	Needham	Church	Norman	7 December 1959	TM2310781912; 52°23′23″N 1°16′39″E	1154114	Church of St Peter More images
Church of St Mary	Norton Subcourse	Parish Church	Earlier	5 September 1960	TM4076298646; 52°31′57″N 1°32′54″E	1306333	Church of St Mary More images
Church of All Saints	Poringland	Parish Church	Late 12th century	26 November 1959	TG2708101701; 52°33′57″N 1°20′57″E	1050466	Church of All Saints More images
Church of St Mary Magdalene	Pulham Market	Parish Church	14th century	7 December 1959	TM1970186076; 52°25′43″N 1°13′49″E	1155029	Church of St Mary Magdalene More images
Church of St Mary	Pulham St Mary	Church	Mid 13th century	7 December 1959	TM2123285271; 52°25′14″N 1°15′08″E	1050185	Church of St Mary More images
Church of St Remigius	Roydon	Church	Norman	7 December 1959	TM0961080378; 52°22′53″N 1°04′42″E	1050237	Church of St Remigius More images
Church of St Andrew, Frenze	Frenze, Scole	Bell Tower	Modern	7 December 1959	TM1353880425; 52°22′49″N 1°08′10″E	1050244	Church of St Andrew, Frenze More images
Church of St Leonard, Billingford	Billingford, Scole	Church	Early 14th century	7 December 1959	TM1681479062; 52°22′00″N 1°11′00″E	1050112	Church of St Leonard, Billingford More images
Scole Inn	Scole	Inn	Mid 17th century	11 September 1951	TM1492878901; 52°21′58″N 1°09′20″E	1303017	Scole Inn More images
Church of All Saints	Shelfanger	Tower	Early 14th century	7 December 1959	TM1073783660; 52°24′37″N 1°05′49″E	1373360	Church of All Saints More images
Church of St Margaret	Hardwick, Shelton and Hardwick	Church	Norman	7 December 1959	TM2231090092; 52°27′49″N 1°16′16″E	1156827	Church of St Margaret More images
Church of St Mary	Shelton and Hardwick	Tower	Late 14th century	7 December 1959	TM2209891041; 52°28′20″N 1°16′07″E	1050096	Church of St Mary More images
The Hall	Shotesham Park, Shotesham	Country House	1784	26 November 1959	TM2247998802; 52°32′30″N 1°16′46″E	1304783	Upload Photo
Church of St Margaret	Starston	Church	14th century	7 December 1959	TM2349784386; 52°24′42″N 1°17′05″E	1050064	Church of St Margaret More images
Church of St Michael	Stockton	Parish Church	12th century	5 September 1960	TM3876894117; 52°29′34″N 1°30′57″E	1050593	Church of St Michael More images
Church of All Saints	Tacolneston	Church	14th century	7 December 1959	TM1495195534; 52°30′55″N 1°09′59″E	1178820	Church of All Saints More images
Church of St Mary	Tasburgh	Church	Perpendicular	7 December 1959	TM2011195887; 52°30′59″N 1°14′33″E	1302231	Church of St Mary More images
Church of St Mary	Tharston and Hapton	Church	14th century	7 December 1959	TM1903094274; 52°30′08″N 1°13′32″E	1373411	Church of St Mary More images
Church of All Saints	Thurlton	Parish Church	12th century	5 September 1960	TM4171598301; 52°31′44″N 1°33′44″E	1050485	Church of All Saints More images
Church of St Ethelbert	Thurton	Parish Church	12th century	5 September 1960	TG3279800658; 52°33′14″N 1°25′57″E	1050637	Church of St Ethelbert More images
Church of All Saints	Tibennam	Tower	15th century	7 December 1959	TM1348489896; 52°27′55″N 1°08′29″E	1049992	Church of All Saints More images
Church of St Margaret	Tivetshall St Margaret	Tower	14th century	7 December 1959	TM1637187041; 52°26′19″N 1°10′55″E	1373033	Church of St Margaret More images
Church of St Margaret	Toft Monks	Parish Church	Late C13/Early 13th century	5 September 1960	TM4263395268; 52°30′05″N 1°34′24″E	1373125	Church of St Margaret More images
Church of St Andrew	Trowse with Newton	Parish Church	13th century	26 November 1959	TG2455106864; 52°36′47″N 1°18′55″E	1050444	Church of St Andrew More images
Church of All Saints	Wacton	Church	12th century	7 December 1959	TM1798491747; 52°28′48″N 1°12′31″E	1372999	Church of All Saints More images
Church of All Saints	Wheatacre	Parish Church	Medieval	5 September 1960	TM4606493941; 52°29′16″N 1°37′22″E	1050598	Church of All Saints More images
Church of All Saints	Wicklewood	Parish Church	15th century	29 November 1959	TG0697702337; 52°34′46″N 1°03′12″E	1152202	Church of All Saints More images
Church of St Mary	Winfarthing	Church	14th century	7 December 1959	TM1093285713; 52°25′43″N 1°06′04″E	1180035	Church of St Mary More images
Church of St Mary	Redenhall, Wortwell	Parish Church	14th century	7 December 1959	TM2639884378; 52°24′38″N 1°19′38″E	1050134	Church of St Mary More images
Church of St Peter and St Paul	Wramplingham	Parish Church	12th century	29 November 1959	TG1132606053; 52°36′40″N 1°07′11″E	1152304	Church of St Peter and St Paul More images
Church of All Saints	Wreningham	Parish Church	Medieval	26 November 1959	TM1633398810; 52°32′39″N 1°11′20″E	1050651	Church of All Saints More images
Abbey Church of St Mary and St Thomas of Canterbury	Wymondham	Tower	1390-1409	29 December 1950	TG1068601497; 52°34′14″N 1°06′27″E	1297494	Abbey Church of St Mary and St Thomas of Canterbury More images
Cavick House including Front Screen Walls	Wymondham	House	Early 18th century	29 December 1950	TG1023801265; 52°34′07″N 1°06′03″E	1196716	Upload Photo
County Library	Wymondham	Chapel/Library	Late 15th century	29 December 1950	TG1087601562; 52°34′16″N 1°06′37″E	1297495	County Library More images
Market Cross	Wymondham	Market Cross	1617-18	29 December 1950	TG1107001472; 52°34′12″N 1°06′47″E	1196678	Market Cross More images
Church of St Mary	Yelverton	Parish Church	12th century	5 September 1960	TG2923402186; 52°34′09″N 1°22′52″E	1050639	Church of St Mary More images
