= John Fuller, Baron Fuller =

British politician (born 1968)

The Right Honourable Councillor The Lord Fuller OBE
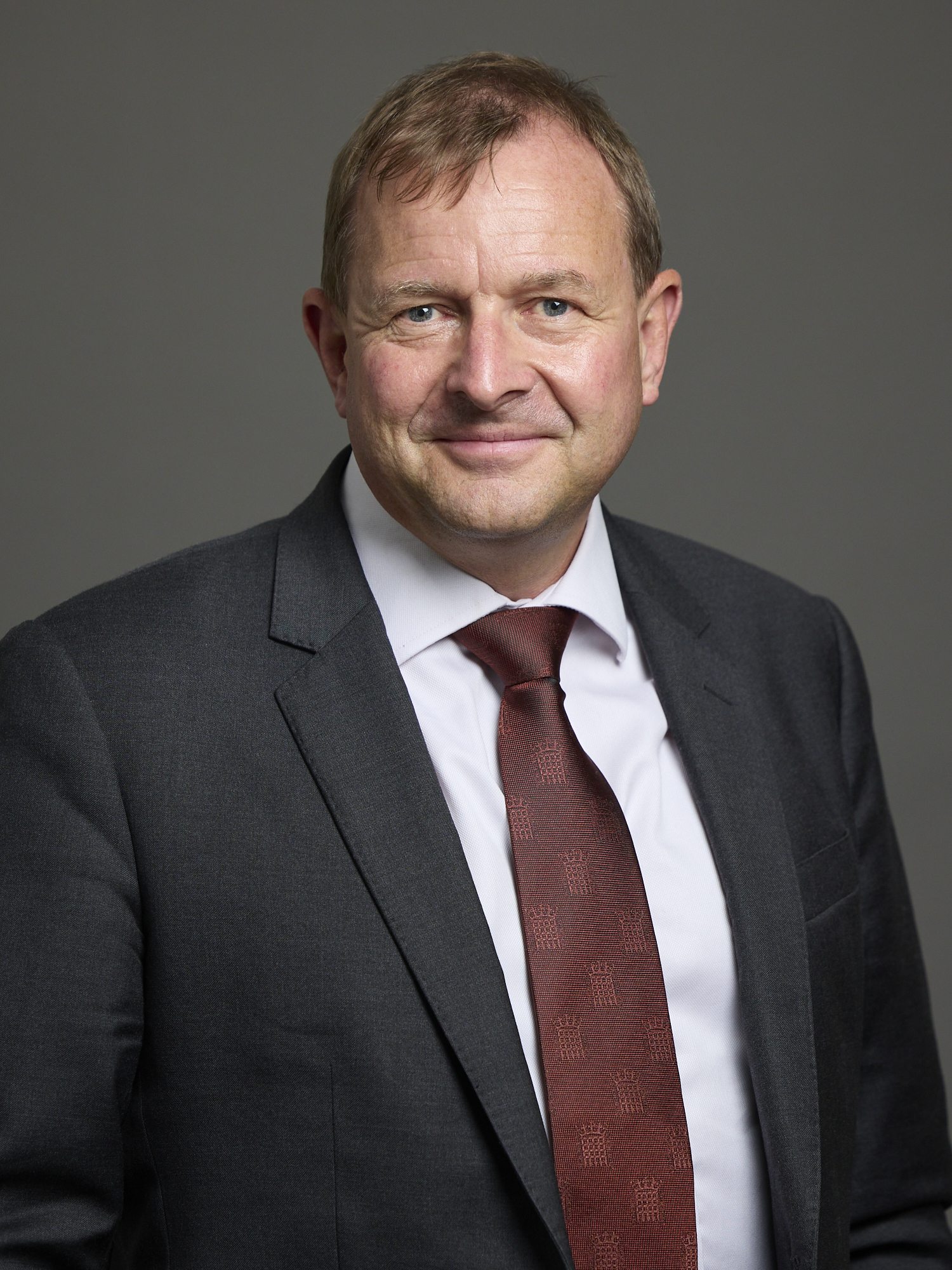
- Official portrait, 2025

Member of the House of Lords
- Lord Temporal
- Life peerage 8 March 2024

Personal details
- Born: John Charles Fuller; 6 June 1968 (age 58) Great Yarmouth, United Kingdom
- Party: Conservative
- Spouse: Philippa Claire Speight
- Children: Susan Mary, Laura Elizabeth

John Charles Fuller, Baron Fuller, OBE (born 6 June 1968) is a British Conservative Party politician. He was Leader of South Norfolk District Council between May 2007 and May 2024. He was appointed a member of the House of Lords in February 2024.

== Early life and family ==
John Charles Fuller was born on 6 June 1968 in Great Yarmouth, Norfolk, to Michael John Fuller and June Renee Fuller. His grandfather Stanley Fuller represented Great Britain in the men's 100m, 200m and 4 × 100 m relay at the 1932 Los Angeles Olympics.

On 1 April 1995, John Fuller married Philippa Claire Speight of Rickmansworth, Hertfordshire. They have two daughters.

== Education ==
Fuller attended Cliff Park Junior School (1973–1978) in Gorleston-on-Sea, Norfolk and later Brandeston Hall Preparatory School (1978–1981) and Framlingham College (1981–1986) in Suffolk. He enrolled in the University of Reading in 1987 where he studied Agriculture, graduating with a First Class Honours Bachelor of Science degree in 1990.

== Commercial career ==
Fuller joined J & H Bunn Ltd, a private fertiliser manufacturing company in Great Yarmouth in May 1991. In 1995 he was awarded a Nuffield Scholarship to study precision farming concepts, investigating emerging technologies in GPS, satellite imagery and the Internet and their application to agriculture. From 1998 to 2011, he was a director of Bunn until it was sold to US-based Koch Industries in March 2011.

Fuller became a founding director and chairman of liquid fertiliser manufacturer Brineflow Ltd in 2011. In the same year, he became a non-executive director of Sentry Ltd, a UK farm management company.

Between 2007 and 2017 he served as a governor of Langley School, near Loddon in Norfolk.

== Political career ==
In May 2003 Fuller was elected to South Norfolk District Council as the Conservative Party member for Brooke Ward, encompassing the villages of Brooke, Howe, Seething, Kirstead, Mundham, and Bergh Apton, as well as Alpington and Yelverton from 2019, following boundary changes. In 2004 he became Leader of the Opposition Conservative Group on South Norfolk Council.

At the 2007 United Kingdom local elections, he became leader of South Norfolk Council. That election saw the largest swing from the Liberal Democrats to the Conservatives in that district council electoral cycle with 20 seats falling from the Liberal Democrats to the Conservative Party,

In the local government elections held successively in May 2011, 2015, 2019, and in 2023, he led local Conservatives to elected majorities, and retained leadership of the council.

On 22 February 2024, he announced he would be relinquishing his Leadership position at the forthcoming Annual Council Meeting having been awarded a Life Peerage. He stepped down as Leader of the council on 20 May 2024 after 17 years in post and was succeeded by Cllr Daniel Elmer.

As council leader, he chaired the Greater Norwich Local Plan (2010–2011), the Greater Norwich Growth Board, and Norfolk Public Sector Leaders Board (2009–2010, 2015–2016 and 2023–2024).

He was a member of the East of England Regional Assembly (2009–2010), and the Norfolk Pension Fund. He has served as a Director on the Local Government Association's as deputy Leader of the Conservative Group of Councillors 2019–2023. In 2013 he was appointed to the Local Government Pension Scheme Advisory Board and chaired the Local Government Pension Committee from 2019 to 2023. He served on the Fire Services Pensions Scheme Advisory Board (2014–2018). In 2015, he was appointed by Brandon Lewis, Housing Minister, as a member of the CIL Review to advise on housing infrastructure finance.

In 2017, Fuller became the chairman of the District Councils' Network, the special interest group for District Councils in England. He served in that position for four years until October 2021, a period which included helping coordinate the local COVID-19 pandemic response amongst English District Councils. In 2019, he was elected by fellow Conservative council leaders to be the deputy leader of the Conservative Party in Local Government and became a director and deputy vice-chairman of the Local Government Association. His term of office expired in July 2023.

Fuller was appointed Officer of the Order of the British Empire (OBE) in the 2019 Birthday Honours for Public and Political service. He was nominated by Prime Minister Rishi Sunak for a life peerage and was created Baron Fuller, of Gorleston-on-Sea in the County of Norfolk, on 8 March 2024. He took his seat in the House of Lords on 12 March 2024

In the Lords, Fuller speaks on Private Business, Agricultural, Planning & Development, Infrastructure, Environmental, Local Government and Pension Issues. He participated in the Home Based Working Committee in 2025, and has sat on the Industry & Regulators Committee since 2026.

Orders of precedence in the United Kingdom
| Preceded by The Lord Booth | Gentlemen; Baron Fuller | Followed by The Lord Marks of Hale |
