= 2019 South Norfolk District Council election =

District-level election in the United Kingdom

- 2 May 2019

All 46 seats to South Norfolk District Council 24 seats needed for a majority

	First party	Second party	Third party
Party	Conservative	Liberal Democrats	Labour
Last election	40 seats, 54.2%	6 seats, 16.8%	0 seats, 19.4%
Seats won	35	10	1
Seat change	▼5	▲4	▲1
Popular vote	31,613	20,310	11,672
Percentage	47.0%	30.2%	17.3%
Swing	▼7.2%	▲13.4%	▼2.1%
- Winner in each seat at the 2019 South Norfolk District Council election
Council control before election
Conservative
Council control after election
Conservative

The 2019 South Norfolk District Council election was held on Thursday 2 May 2019 to elect the whole council as part of 2019 United Kingdom local elections.

== Results summary ==
2019 South Norfolk District Council election
Party	Seats	Gains	Losses	Net gain/loss	Seats %	Votes %	Votes	+/−
Conservative	35	–	–	▼5	76.1	47.0	31,613	–7.2
Liberal Democrats	10	–	–	▲4	21.7	30.2	20,310	+13.4
Labour	1	–	–	▲1	2.2	17.3	11,672	–2.1
UKIP	0	–	–	Steady	0.0	2.1	1,422	–3.1
Green	0	–	–	Steady	0.0	1.4	954	–2.9
Independent	0	–	–	Steady	0.0	1.1	761	+0.9
Community Candidate Party	0	–	–	Steady	0.0	0.8	550	N/A

== Ward results ==
=== Beck Vale, Dickleburgh & Scole ===
Martin Wilby was previously the member for Dickleburgh Ward and Clayton Hudson was previously the member for Beck Vale Ward.

Beck Vale, Dickleburgh & Scole
Party	Candidate	Votes	%	±%
Conservative	Martin Wilby*	1,051	56.7	
Conservative	Clayton Hudson*	953	51.4	
Liberal Democrats	Thomas Williamson	474	25.6	
Labour	Pamela Reekie	395	21.3	
Labour	Dolores Ward	257	13.9	
Turnout		1,853	36.3	
Conservative win (new seat)				
Conservative win (new seat)				

=== Bressingham & Burston ===
Bressingham & Burston
Party	Candidate	Votes	%	±%
Conservative	James Easter	468	45.5	
Liberal Democrats	Brian Norman	174	16.9	
Green	David Reynolds	153	14.9	
UKIP	Paul Chambers	119	11.6	
Labour	Elana Katz	115	11.2	
Majority		294	28.6	
Turnout		1,045	38.8	
Conservative hold		Swing		

=== Brooke ===
Brooke
Party	Candidate	Votes	%	±%
Conservative	John Fuller*	718	55.7	
Liberal Democrats	Jennifer Young	381	29.6	
Labour	Peter Ryland	189	14.7	
Majority		337	26.1	
Turnout		1,331	50.5	
Conservative hold		Swing		

=== Bunwell ===
Bunwell
Party	Candidate	Votes	%	±%
Conservative	Stephen Ridley	511	57.7	
Liberal Democrats	Bodo Rissmann	220	24.9	
Labour	Katherine Jones	154	17.4	
Majority		291	32.8	
Turnout		923	37.6	
Conservative hold		Swing		

=== Central Wymondham ===
Central Wymondham
Party	Candidate	Votes	%	±%
Conservative	Kevin Hurn	735	40.9	
Conservative	Robert Savage*	714	39.7	
Community Candidate Party	Peter Travis	550	30.6	
Liberal Democrats	Peter Heywood	377	21.0	
Labour	Kevin O'Grady	342	19.0	
Labour	Hilary Leman	305	17.0	
Independent	Michael Welton	262	14.6	
Turnout		1,799	37.6	
Conservative win (new seat)				
Conservative win (new seat)				

=== Cringleford ===
William Kemp was previously the member for Thurlton Ward elected in 2007 and re-elected in 2011 and 2015

Cringleford
Party	Candidate	Votes	%	±%
Conservative	Daniel Elmer	663	45.9	
Conservative	William Kemp*	659	45.6	
Labour Co-op	Simon Chapman	473	32.7	
Liberal Democrats	Andrew Brown	406	28.1	
Labour	Leisa Devlin	405	28.0	
Turnout		1,446	39.1	
Conservative hold				
Conservative hold				

=== Diss & Roydon ===
Diss & Roydon
Party	Candidate	Votes	%	±%
Conservative	Graham Minshull*	1,163	48.1	
Conservative	Keith Kiddie*	1,129	46.7	
Conservative	Jennifer Wilby*	1,036	42.9	
Liberal Democrats	Fione Wenman	651	26.9	
Liberal Democrats	Trevor Wenman	596	24.7	
Liberal Democrats	David Traube	556	23.0	
Labour	Jane Jennifer	475	19.7	
Labour	Christopher Davison	432	17.9	
Labour	Susan Rees	422	17.5	
Turnout		2,416	29.3	
Conservative win (new seat)				
Conservative win (new seat)				
Conservative win (new seat)				

=== Ditchingham & Earsham ===
Ditchingham & Earsham
Party	Candidate	Votes	%	±%
Liberal Democrats	Brandon Bernard*	919	47.6	
Liberal Democrats	Christopher Brown	805	41.7	
Conservative	Barry Stone*	560	29.0	
Conservative	Margaret Stone	551	28.5	
UKIP	Ian Cross	274	14.2	
Labour	Stephen Pank	240	12.4	
Labour	Geraldine Smith-Cullen	189	9.8	
Turnout		1,930	37.5	
Liberal Democrats win (new seat)				
Liberal Democrats win (new seat)				

=== Easton ===
Easton
Party	Candidate	Votes	%	±%
Conservative	Margarey Dewsbury*	327	62.4	
Labour	Nigel Crouch	91	17.4	
UKIP	William Ashpole	59	11.3	
Liberal Democrats	Jennifer Pitchford	47	9.0	
Majority		236	45.0	
Turnout		529	34.4	
Conservative hold		Swing		

=== Forncett ===
Forncett
Party	Candidate	Votes	%	±%
Conservative	Barry Duffin	476	47.1	
Liberal Democrats	Robert McClenning	361	35.7	
Labour	Bethan Gulliver	173	17.1	
Majority		115	11.4	
Turnout		1,033	38.9	
Conservative hold		Swing		

=== Harleston ===
Brian Riches stood as an independent having been elected in 2015 as a Conservative.

Harleston
Party	Candidate	Votes	%	±%
Conservative	Jeremy Savage*	587	41.1	
Conservative	Fleur Curson	546	38.2	
Independent	Brian Riches*	366	25.6	
Liberal Democrats	Susan Kuzmic	363	25.4	
Labour	James Eddy	361	25.3	
Labour	David Reekie	220	15.4	
Turnout		1,428	30.3	
Conservative hold				
Conservative hold				

=== Hempnall ===
Michael Edney was elected as the Member for Wicklewood Ward in 2011 and 2015

Hempnall
Party	Candidate	Votes	%	±%
Conservative	Michael Edney*	485	49.9	
Liberal Democrats	Marian Miller	305	31.4	
Labour	Janet King	181	18.6	
Majority		180	15.5	
Turnout		988	38.2	
Conservative hold		Swing		

=== Hethersett ===
Hethersett
Party	Candidate	Votes	%	±%
Conservative	David Bills-Everett*	1,208	56.0	
Conservative	Philip Hardy*	1,063	49.3	
Conservative	Adrian Dearnley	1,023	47.4	
Liberal Democrats	Jaqueline Sutton	955	44.3	
Labour	Andrew Pearson	663	30.7	
Labour	Peter Reason	485	22.5	
Turnout		2,157	35.0	
Conservative hold				
Conservative hold				
Conservative win (new seat)				

=== Hingham & Deopham ===
Hingham & Deopham
Party	Candidate	Votes	%	±%
Conservative	Yvonne Bendle*	564	70.8	
Liberal Democrats	Gary Blundell	233	29.2	
Majority		331	41.6	
Turnout		829	33.5	
Conservative hold		Swing		

=== Loddon & Chedgrave ===
Loddon & Chedgrave
Party	Candidate	Votes	%	±%
Conservative	Kay Mason Billig*	732	45.0	
Labour	Jeremy Rowe	632	38.8	
Conservative	Dr Christopher Kemp*	514	31.6	
Liberal Democrats	Judith Tryggvason	457	28.1	
UKIP	Ronald Murphy	247	15.2	
Turnout		1,628	36.2	
Conservative win (new seat)				
Labour win (new seat)				

=== Mulbarton & Stoke Holy Cross ===
Mulbarton & Stoke Holy Cross
Party	Candidate	Votes	%	±%
Conservative	Dr. Nigel Legg*	1,275	49.1	
Conservative	Gerald Francis	1,040	40.1	
Liberal Democrats	Vivienne Clifford-Jackson	981	37.8	
Conservative	Davina Tanner MBE	915	35.3	
Liberal Democrats	Ian Spratt	786	30.3	
Liberal Democrats	Huw Sayer	692	26.7	
Labour	John Martin	470	18.1	
Labour	Steven Sewell	469	18.1	
Labour	Matthew Parker	360	13.9	
Turnout		2,595	36.8	
Conservative win (new seat)				
Conservative win (new seat)				
Liberal Democrats win (new seat)				

=== New Costessey ===
New Costessey
Party	Candidate	Votes	%	±%
Liberal Democrats	John Amis*	674	44.8	
Liberal Democrats	Brendan Burrill	569	37.8	
Conservative	Andrew Wiltshire	322	21.4	
Conservative	Francisco Davila	310	20.6	
Labour	Iftkhar Alam	258	17.1	
UKIP	Michelle Newton	233	15.5	
Labour	Rouell Sealey	197	13.1	
Independent	John Flowerdew	133	8.8	
Turnout		1,506	29.6	
Liberal Democrats hold				
Liberal Democrats hold				

=== Newton Flotman ===
Florence Ellis was previously the Member for Tasburgh Ward, elected in 2011 and 2015

Newton Flotman
Party	Candidate	Votes	%	±%
Conservative	Florence Ellis*	453	51.8	
Liberal Democrats	Shirley Hagger	253	28.9	
Labour	Andrew Connors	168	19.2	
Majority		200	22.9	
Turnout		890	36.1	
Conservative hold		Swing		

=== North Wymondham ===
North Wymondham
Party	Candidate	Votes	%	±%
Conservative	Anthony Holden	606	46.7	
Conservative	Jack Hornby*	533	41.0	
Liberal Democrats	Penelope Hubble	411	31.6	
Liberal Democrats	David Roberts	360	27.7	
Labour	Douglas Underwood	260	20.0	
Labour	James Leman	229	17.6	
Turnout		1,299	31.3	
Conservative win (new seat)				
Conservative win (new seat)				

=== Old Costessey ===
Old Costessey
Party	Candidate	Votes	%	±%
Liberal Democrats	Sharon Blundell*	1,060	58.9	
Liberal Democrats	Terence Laidlaw	805	44.7	
Liberal Democrats	Elizabeth Glover	670	37.2	
Conservative	Andrew Pond*	529	29.4	
Conservative	Daniel Taylor	486	27.0	
Labour	David Vail	425	23.6	
Conservative	Joshua Woolliscroft	395	21.9	
Turnout		1,800	26.1	
Liberal Democrats gain from Conservative				
Liberal Democrats hold				
Liberal Democrats hold				

=== Poringland, Framinghams & Trowse ===
Poringland, Framinghams & Trowse
Party	Candidate	Votes	%	±%
Conservative	John Overton*	1,094	44.9	
Conservative	Lisa Neal*	954	39.2	
Conservative	Trevor Spruce	898	36.9	
Liberal Democrats	Trevor Lewis*	800	32.9	
Liberal Democrats	Hazel Smith	713	29.3	
Liberal Democrats	Matthew Hammond	635	26.1	
Green	Julie Young	370	15.2	
Labour	Nicola Fowler	369	15.2	
Labour	James Landshoft	309	12.7	
Labour	Thomas Fowler	304	12.5	
UKIP	Edward Fields	232	9.5	
Turnout		2,435	41.5	
Conservative win (new seat)				
Conservative win (new seat)				
Conservative win (new seat)				

=== Rockland ===
Rockland
Party	Candidate	Votes	%	±%
Conservative	Victor Thomson	446	40.8	
Labour	Amanda Lindsay	197	18.0	
Green	Birgitta Campbell-Johnston	185	16.9	
Liberal Democrats	Robert Coyle	174	15.9	
UKIP	Lynn Smedley	90	8.2	
Majority		249	22.8	
Turnout		1,099	39.9	
Conservative hold		Swing		

=== South Wymondham ===
South Wymondham
Party	Candidate	Votes	%	±%
Liberal Democrats	Suzanne Nuri	712	56.6	
Liberal Democrats	Julian Halls	639	50.8	
Conservative	Craig McLeod	457	36.4	
Conservative	Martyn Lemon	448	35.6	
Turnout		1,257	32.7	
Liberal Democrats win (new seat)				
Liberal Democrats win (new seat)				

=== Stratton ===
Desmond Fulcher had been elected in 2015 as a Conservative

Stratton
Party	Candidate	Votes	%	±%
Conservative	Alison Thomas*	559	52.4	
Conservative	Joshua Worley	411	38.5	
Liberal Democrats	Desmond Fulcher*	297	27.8	
Liberal Democrats	Sean Morgan	263	24.6	
UKIP	Archie Clifford	168	15.7	
Labour	Sarah Langton	139	13.0	
Labour	Alyson Read	138	12.9	
Turnout		1,067	31.5	
Conservative hold				
Conservative hold				

=== Thurlton ===
Thurlton
Party	Candidate	Votes	%	±%
Conservative	James Knight	437	45.8	
Liberal Democrats	Andrew Barber	336	35.2	
Labour	Sally Blaikie	181	19.0	
Majority		101	10.6	
Turnout		994	38.4	
Conservative hold		Swing		

=== Wicklewood ===
Wicklewood
Party	Candidate	Votes	%	±%
Conservative	Richard Elliott	609	57.7	
Green	Victoria Walters	246	23.3	
Liberal Democrats	Janey Watson	201	19.0	
Majority		363	34.4	
Turnout		1,074	40.7	
Conservative hold		Swing		

== By-elections ==
Mulbarton and Stoke Holy Cross By-Election 5 May 2022
Party	Candidate	Votes	%	±%
Liberal Democrats	Ian Spratt	1,202	42.0	+6.0
Conservative	Silvia Schmidtova	969	33.8	−13.0
Labour	John Martin	402	14.0	−3.2
Green	Tom Williamson	183	6.4	+6.4
Reform	Andrew Pond	107	3.7	+3.7
Majority		233	8.1	
Turnout		2,863		
Liberal Democrats hold		Swing		
