= Bergh Apton =

Village in Norfolk, England

Coordinates: 52.561°N 1.402°E

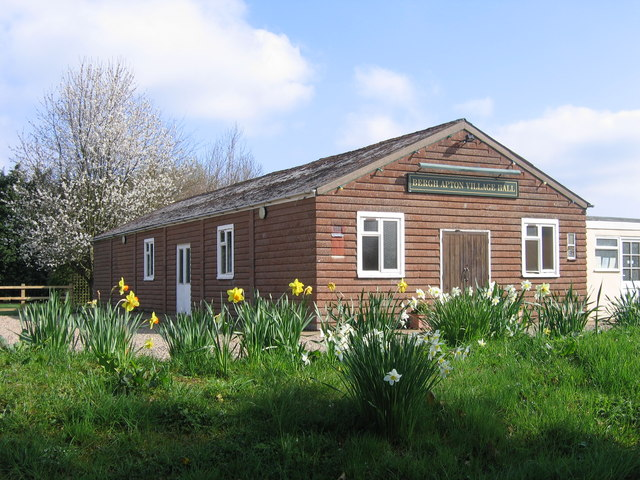
- Bergh Apton Village Hall

- Location within Norfolk
- Area: 8.05 km^{2} (3.11 sq mi)
- Population: 442 (2011)
  - Density: 55/km^{2} (140/sq mi)
- OS grid reference: TG232085
- Civil parish: Bergh Apton
- District: South Norfolk
- Shire county: Norfolk
- Region: East
- Country: England
- Sovereign state: United Kingdom
- Post town: NORWICH
- Postcode district: NR15
- Dialling code: 01508
- Police: Norfolk
- Fire: Norfolk
- Ambulance: East of England

Bergh Apton is a village and civil parish in the South Norfolk district of Norfolk, England. It is 7 miles (11 km) south-east of Norwich, close to the A146 road between Yelverton and Thurton. According to the 2001 census it had a population of 428 in 186 households, the population increasing to 442 at the 2011 Census.

== History ==
The origin of the name 'Bergh Apton' is from the joining of two separate villages: Apton to the north-west and Bergh to the south-east, each with its own church. Apton was served by the church of St. Martin; its last recorded use was in 1555 and the remains were cleared in 1834. Bergh was served by the Church of St. Peter and St. Paul which stands on a low hill overlooking the River Chet on the southern boundary of the combined parish. The church appears to have been reconstructed in the 14th century, with local flint with ashlar and brick details.

== Amenities ==
The village school was closed in 1981 and the children transferred to Alpington and Bergh Apton CofE voluntary-aided school in Alpington. The village shop and Post Office closed on 31 December 2012; in August 2015 the Post Office reopened in a garden centre on the A146. The village hall opened in 1953 was refurbished in 2013.

Bergh Apton is served by a bus route into Norwich and to Seething and Loddon.

== See also ==
- Bergh Apton Anglo-Saxon cemetery
