= Stockton, Norfolk =

Village in Norfolk, England

Coordinates: 52.49058°N 1.52162°E

Stockton
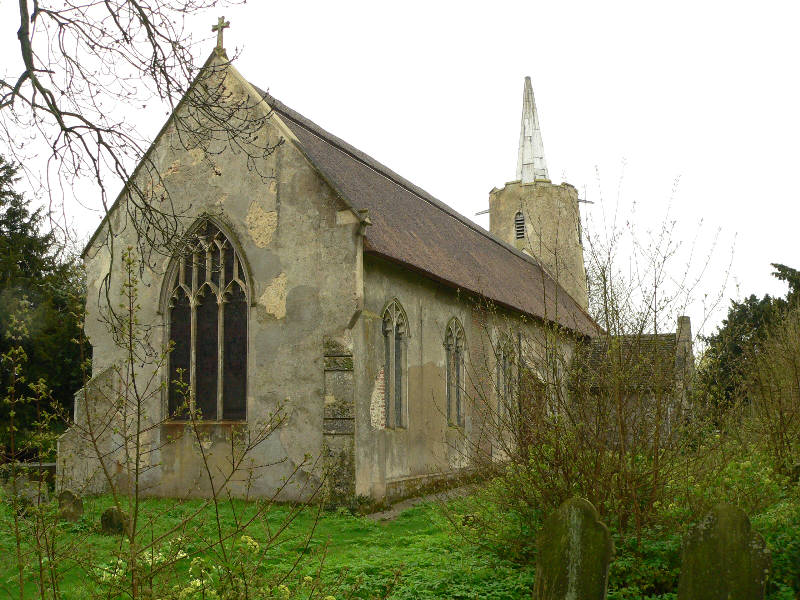
- Stockton, St Michael and All Angels

- Location within Norfolk
- Area: 3.65 km^{2} (1.41 sq mi)
- Population: 59
  - Density: 16/km^{2} (41/sq mi)
- OS grid reference: TM391939
- Civil parish: Stockton
- District: South Norfolk
- Shire county: Norfolk
- Region: East
- Country: England
- Sovereign state: United Kingdom
- Post town: BECCLES
- Postcode district: NR34
- Dialling code: 01508
- Police: Norfolk
- Fire: Norfolk
- Ambulance: East of England
- UK Parliament: South Norfolk

Stockton is a small village in Norfolk, England near the A146, just over 2 miles from Beccles in neighbouring Suffolk. It covers an area of 3.65 km^{2} (1.41 sq mi) and had a population of 59 in 25 households at the 2001 census.

Its church, St Michael, is one of 124 existing round-tower churches in Norfolk.

== Mediaeval History ==
"The little village of Stockton was once the centre of an important lordship," writes Elisabeth Crowfoot (1914-2005) in a note published in the local parish magazine. In Anglo-Saxon times, she notes, it was part of the manor of Earsham, belonging to Stigand, the Archbishop of Canterbury (1052-1070): "When the Saxon Archbishop Stigand quarrelled with William the Conqueror, his lands, including Stockton, were confiscated by the Crown".

In 1140 King Stephen granted Stockton, including the manors of Ellingham, Geldeston, Gillingham, Kirby Cane, Winston and Wyndale (Windle), with the right to hold court and set up a gallows, to Hugh Bigod, the newly created Earl of Norfolk. In 1178, Hugh's son Ralph, the next owner, obtained exclusive fishing rights on the Waveney from Stockton to Shipmeadow, and the right to cut reeds, like those used to thatch the church (it still has a thatched roof today), and to cut rushes for strewing the floors.

The manor passed through the last Bigod heir, Elisabeth Bigot, to her husband William Garneys, but Stockton and Geldeston did not remain long in the family's possession. In 1447, the year after the death of Garneys' son Ralph, they were occupied by William de la Pole, 1st Duke of Suffolk.

== Parochial records ==
The Stockton church registers go back to 1561, though some early pages are missing. The “Stockton Town Book”, a manuscript volume containing churchwardens’ accounts for the years 1625–1712, has also been preserved.

Among the information included in the Town Book that for the English Civil War (1642-1649) provides a glimpse of a small Norfolk village at the time. Two villagers and the rector went away to fight. Thomas Bande was paid 10 shillings in 1640 “for being content to be a soldier for the Town”; John Bird, parish clerk, received 15 shillings when “impressed” for the same purpose in 1643, and his wife was supported by the parish until he returned “maimed from Naseby fight” (14 June 1645). The Rector at this period, William Stannard, went to fight for the Crown against the Scots.

Perhaps Stannard did so against the wishes of the parish, because in 1641 the Town refused to pay 30 shillings for the musket he lost in “the northern expedition”. In 1645 they relented and gave him £1, and he stayed on to look after his flock as “parish registrar” under the Commonwealth until his death in 1655.

== See also ==
- Clavering hundred
