= Attorney General Hobart =

Attorney General Hobart may refer to:

- Sir Henry Hobart, 1st Baronet (1560–1625), Attorney General for England and Wales
- James Hobart (1436–1517), Attorney General for England and Wales
