= River Chet =

River in South Norfolk, England

Chet
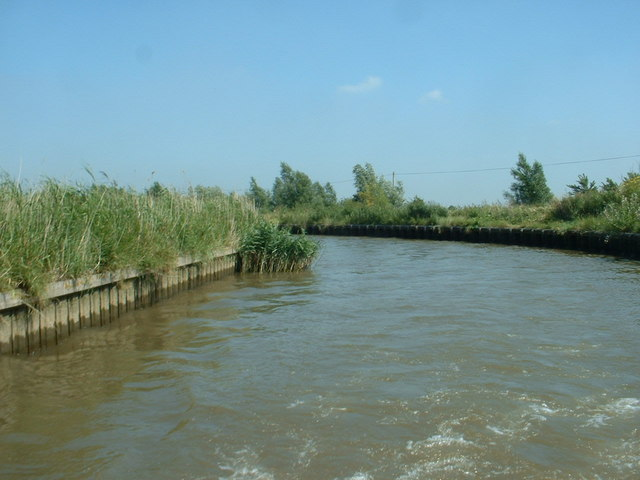

- Location of the river mouth within Norfolk

Location
- Country: England
- Region: Norfolk

Physical characteristics
- Source
  - location: Poringland
  - coordinates: 52.5584°N 1.3465°E
  - elevation: 33 m (108 ft)
- Mouth: River Yare
  - coordinates: 52.5554°N 1.5404°E
  - elevation: 0 m (0 ft)
- Length: 16.5 km (10.3 mi)

Basin features
- River system: River Yare

The River Chet is a small river in South Norfolk, England, a tributary of the River Yare. It rises in Poringland and flows eastwards through Alpington, Bergh Apton, Thurton and Loddon. At Loddon it passes under the A146 through Loddon Mill and into Loddon Staithe. From this point onwards the river is navigable. It then passes Hardley Flood to the north, a nature reserve part-managed by the Norfolk Wildlife Trust. The river finally joins the River Yare one mile west of Reedham at Hardley Cross, erected in 1676, which marks the ancient boundary between the City of Norwich and the Borough of Great Yarmouth. The total navigable length is some 3½ miles.

== Fishing ==
Fishing is permitted between Loddon and Hardley Cross, bream and roach being the most common catch.

== Churches ==
A number of churches along the river are known as the "Chet Valley Churches". Most belong to the Church of England but they include the Church in Loddon, a combined Anglican and Methodist congregation.

External videos
- A Musical Journey Up The River Chet Aboard The Fair Soverign 2
