= Hobart High School =

Hobart High School may refer to:

- Hobart High School, Norfolk
- Hobart High School (Indiana)
- Hobart College, Tasmania, formerly known as Hobart High School
- Hobart City High School
