= Poplar Farm Meadows, Langley =

Protected area in Norfolk, England

Coordinates: 52.565°N 1.495°E

- Site of Special Scientific Interest
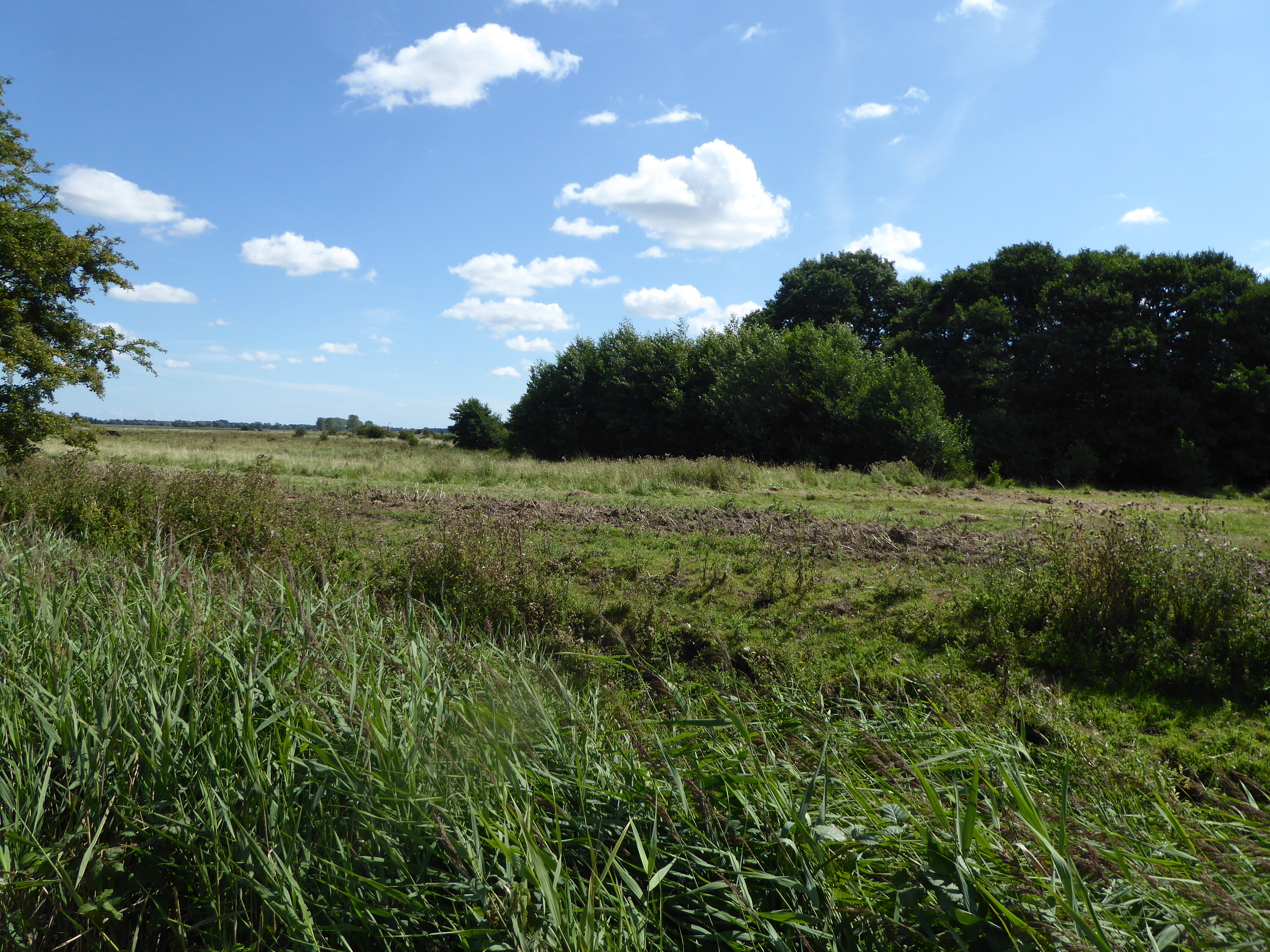
- Location of Poplar Farm Meadows, Langley.
- Area of search: Norfolk
- Grid reference: TG 370 021
- Interest: Biological
- Area: 7.5 hectares (19 acres)
- Notification date: 1985
- Location map: Magic Map

Poplar Farm Meadows, Langley is a 7.5-hectare (19-acre) biological Site of Special Scientific Interest east of Loddon in Norfolk, England. It is part of the Broadland Ramsar site and Special Protection Area, and The Broads Special Area of Conservation.

This calcareous fen on the edge of the flood plain of the River Yare is spring-fed. It is managed by light summer grazing and the flora is diverse, with some uncommon species. There are also areas of tall fen and the site is crossed by dykes which have clear spring water and a variety of aquatic plants.

The site is private land with no public access.
