= Hardey =

Hardey may refer to:

Surname

- Elliott Hardey (born 1932), Progressive Conservative party member of the House of Commons of Canada
- Jemma Hardey, fictitious main character in The Last Albatross by Ian Irvine
- Mary Aloysia Hardey, (1809–1886), American religious sister of the Society of the Sacred Heart
- Richard Hardey (1844–1910), Australian pastoralist and politician, member of the Legislative Council of Western Australia

Given name

- Francis Hardey Faulding (1816–1868), founder of a pharmaceutical company in Adelaide, Australia, in 1845

Geography

- Hardey Land District, cadastral division of Western Australia within the North-West Land Division
- Hardey River, in the Pilbara region of Western Australia

== See also ==
- Hardley (disambiguation)
- Hardy (disambiguation)
