= Clavering hundred =

Geographical subdivision in England

Clavering hundred was the name of two distinct hundreds in the English counties of Essex and Norfolk respectively. Hundreds were divisions of areas of land within shires or counties for administrative and judicial purposes – and for the collection of taxes.

== Clavering hundred, Essex ==
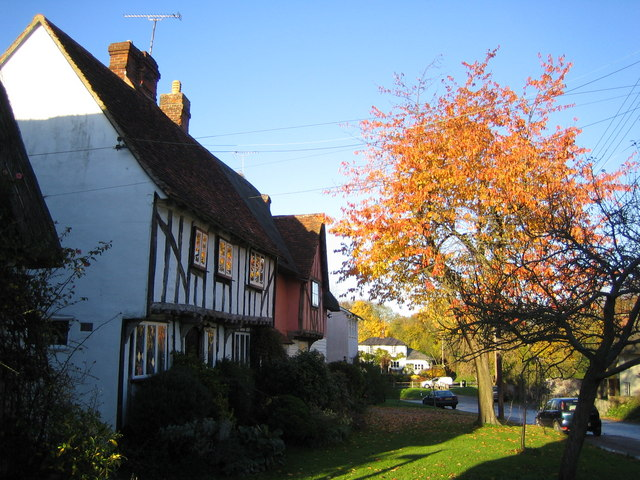
Middle Street, Clavering, Essex

The hundred of Clavering in Essex was the smallest hundred in the county, and was sometimes referred to as a half-hundred. It was bounded on the west and south by Hertfordshire, and on the north and east by Uttlesford hundred within Essex. In the Middle Ages, the hundred was owned by the early Earls of Essex. It contained the six parishes of Berden, Clavering, Farnham, Langley, Manewden, and Ugley; and the hamlets of Bentfield and Pledgdon.

== Clavering Hundred, Norfolk ==
Clavering Hundred - Norfolk

The hundred of Clavering in Norfolk was located in the far southeast of the county. The main body of the hundred was bounded to the south and east by the River Waveney, on the north by the River Yare, and on the west by Loddon hundred. A smaller detached portion lay on the opposite side of Loddon hundred, and was enclosed on the western side by Henstead hundred. The main part of the hundred contained the parishes of Aldeby, Burgh St Peter, Ellingham, Geldeston, Gillingham All Saints and St Mary, Haddiscoe, Hales, Heckingham, Kirby Cane, Norton Subcourse, Raveningham, Stockton, Thorp-next-Haddiscoe, Thurlton, Toft-Monks, and Wheatacre All Saints. The detached portion consisted of Brooke, Burgh-Apton, and Howe. In the reign of Edward I, the hundred was farmed on behalf of Sir John de Clavering, whose family may have originally taken their surname from the town of that name in the identically-named hundred in Essex. In 1763 Clavering and Loddon hundreds, along with the parish of Yelverton from Henstead hundred, were combined to form the Loddon and Clavering Union for the purposes of Poor Law administration.

== See also ==
- List of Essex Hundreds in 1844
- Hundreds of Essex
- Hundreds of Norfolk
