= Hugh Bigod =

Hugh Bigod may refer to:

- Hugh Bigod, 1st Earl of Norfolk (1095–1177), founder of the English family of this name
- Hugh le Bigod, Member of Parliament (MP) for Essex
- Hugh Bigod (peer), son of Hugh Bigod, 1st Earl of Norfolk by 2nd marriage, see Bigod family
- Hugh Bigod, 3rd Earl of Norfolk (1182–1225)
- Hugh Bigod (Justiciar) (died 1266), youngest son of Hugh Bigod, 3rd Earl of Norfolk

== See also ==
- Bigod
