= Stuart Marks, Baron Marks of Hale =

British businessman and politician

The Right Honourable The Lord Marks of Hale CBE
- Official portrait, 2026

Member of the House of Lords
- Lord Temporal
- Life peerage 8 March 2024

Personal details
- Born: Stuart Adam Marks
- Party: Conservative
- Occupation: Businessman

Stuart Adam Marks, Baron Marks of Hale, CBE is a British technology businessman and philanthropist.

He is a senior treasurer and a donor to the Conservative Party, having given £119,500 to the party between 2013 and 2024.

Marks was appointed Commander of the Order of the British Empire (CBE) in the 2019 Birthday Honours for voluntary political service. Nominated for a life peerage by Prime Minister Rishi Sunak, he was created Baron Marks of Hale, of Hale in the County of Greater Manchester, on 8 March 2024.

Orders of precedence in the United Kingdom
Preceded by The Lord Fuller	Gentlemen; Baron Marks of Hale	Followed by The Lord Goodman of Wycombe
