= Hardley Flood =

UK Site of Special Scientific Interest

Coordinates: 52.542°N 1.508°E

- Site of Special Scientific Interest
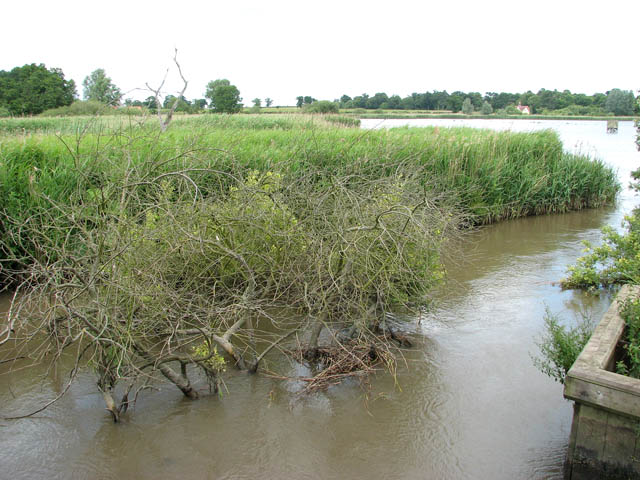
- Location of Hardley Flood.
- Area of search: Norfolk
- Grid reference: TM 380 996
- Interest: Biological
- Area: 49.8 hectares (123 acres)
- Notification date: 1990
- Location map: Magic Map

Hardley Flood is a 49.8-hectare (123-acre) biological Site of Special Scientific Interest near Loddon, between Norwich, Lowestoft and Great Yarmouth in Norfolk, England. It is part of the Broadland Ramsar site and Special Protection Area, and The Broads Special Area of Conservation.

This area of tidal lagoons and reedbeds provides a spillway for the River Chet. The reedbeds provide nesting sites for birds, including nationally important populations of several breeding birds. Three rare flies have been recorded, Elachiptera uniseta, Elachiptera scrobiculata and Lonchoptera scutellata.

The site is open to the public.
