= Hardley =

Hardley may refer to the following places in England:

- Hardley, Hampshire, a suburb of the village of Hythe near Southampton in Hampshire
- Hardley, Norfolk, in the parish of Langley with Hardley
  - Hardley Flood, a Site of Special Scientific Interest on the north bank of the River Chet northeast of Loddon
