= Bigod =

Bigod is a surname. Notable people with the surname include:

- Francis Bigod (1507–1537), British noble
- Hugh Bigod (disambiguation), multiple people
- Roger Bigod (disambiguation), multiple people
- William Bigod (died 1120), English heir
- Bigod family

== See also ==
- Bigod's rebellion
- Bigod 20, German EDM band
