= Farnham, Essex =

Village in Essex, England

Coordinates: 51.9022°N 0.1434°E

Farnham
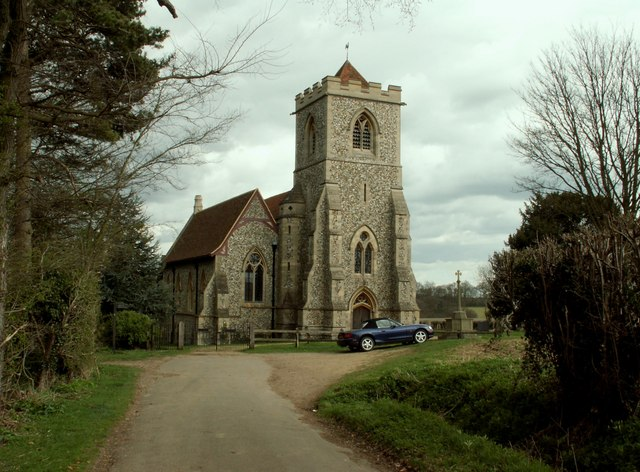
- St. Mary the Virgin church, Farnham

- Location within Essex
- Population: 418 (Parish, 2021)
- OS grid reference: TL474248
- District: Uttlesford
- Shire county: Essex
- Region: East
- Country: England
- Sovereign state: United Kingdom
- Post town: BISHOP'S STORTFORD
- Postcode district: CM23
- Dialling code: 01279
- Police: Essex
- Fire: Essex
- Ambulance: East of England

Farnham is a village and civil parish in the Uttlesford district of Essex, England. It lies 2 miles (3 km) north of Bishop's Stortford, its post town, which is over the county boundary in Hertfordshire. The parish has a dispersed pattern of development; as well as the small village of Farnham itself the parish also includes a number of small hamlets, including Farnham Green, Chatter End, Level's End and Hazel End. At the 2021 census the parish had a population of 418.

Farnham Church of England Primary School and the parish church, dedicated to St Mary, are in Farnham village. There is a public house, the Three Horseshoes, at Hazel End.

== History ==
The name Farnham is Old English and means the village or homestead amongst the ferns.

Farnham is mentioned in the Domesday Book as one of the settlements in Clavering hundred.

== Farnham Primary School ==
Farnham C of E Primary School is a primary school in Farnham, Essex, England. Farnham Primary School is located on the Essex/Herts county border, within two miles (3 km) of Stansted Mountfitchet and Bishop's Stortford, and takes pupils from both counties.

Founded in 1874, Farnham primary is Essex's smallest school with about 50 pupils in 2023. It has three classes: Willow (from Reception to Year 1), Silver Birch (from Year 2 to Year 4) and Horse Chestnut (Year 5 to Year 6). Children graduating from Farnham mostly attend secondary schools in Bishop's Stortford and it lies within Joyce Franklin High school's priority admissions area.

The school is in federation with the larger nearby Rickling Church of England Primary School, where pupils visit weekly for curriculum enrichment activities, including art, gardening, drama, yoga and sports. Both schools share an executive head and deputy head. The deputy head teaches Horse Chestnut class in Farnham.

Farnham primary enjoys consistently good SATS results. In 2013, 100% of Year 6 pupils achieved Level 4+ and 50% achieved Level 5 in mathematics and reading. This compares very favourably with the national average and out-performs most schools in the area.

In 2014, the school was the subject of a high-profile campaign to keep it in Farnham and prevent it from moving to nearby Stansted Mountfitchet, as proposed by Essex County Council and the Diocese Board of Education for Chelmsford. The proposals were unanimously opposed by the parish councils of Farnham and Stansted and the Farnham parochial church. In response, the school governors voted to reject the proposals.

== See also ==
- The Hundred Parishes
