= Burston and Shimpling =

Civil parish in Norfolk, England

Coordinates: 52.40°N 1.15°E

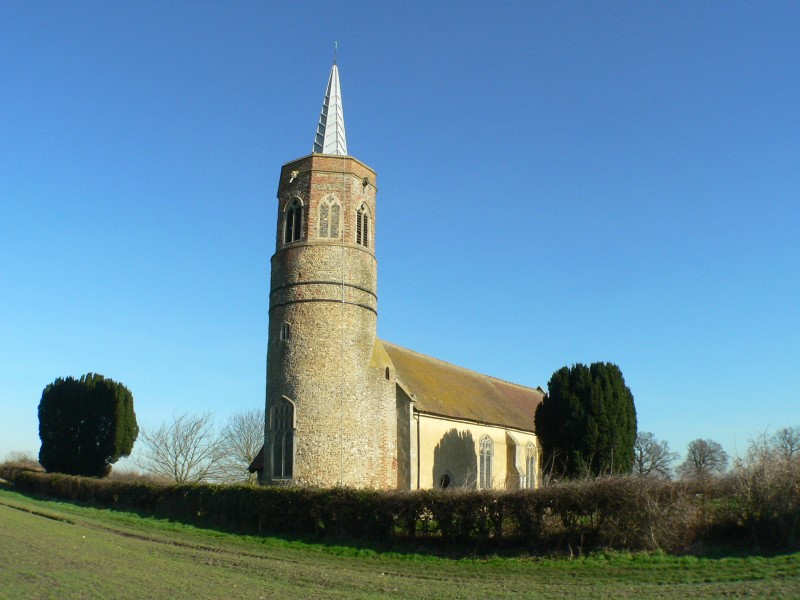
- St George's Church, Shimpling

- Location within Norfolk
- Area: 9.17 km^{2} (3.54 sq mi)
- Population: 568
  - Density: 62/km^{2} (160/sq mi)
- OS grid reference: TM143827
- Civil parish: Burston and Shimpling
- District: South Norfolk
- Shire county: Norfolk
- Region: East
- Country: England
- Sovereign state: United Kingdom
- Post town: DISS
- Postcode district: IP21, IP22
- Dialling code: 01379
- Police: Norfolk
- Fire: Norfolk
- Ambulance: East of England

Burston and Shimpling is a civil parish in the county of Norfolk, England. The parish covers an area of 9.17 km^{2} (3.54 sq mi) and had a population of 538 in 206 households at the 2001 census, the population increasing to 568 in 234 households at the 2011 Census. It includes the village of Burston and Shimpling.

The Church of St George, Shimpling, is one of 124 existing round-tower churches in Norfolk. It is in care of the Churches Conservation Trust.
