= Old Town Hall, Loddon =

Municipal building in Loddon, Norfolk, England

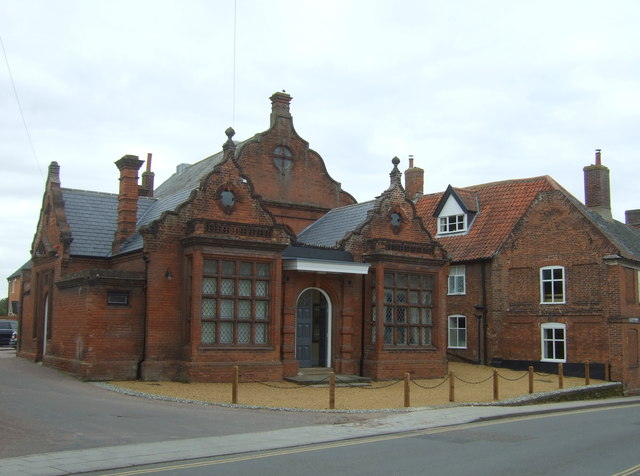
- Old Town Hall, Loddon

- Shown in Norfolk
- 52.5356°N 1.4809°E
- Location: Bridge Street, Loddon

History
- Built: 1870

Site notes
- Architectural style: Jacobean style

Listed Building – Grade II
- Official name: Former Town Hall
- Designated: 4 February 1977
- Reference no.: 1169370

The Old Town Hall is a former events venue in Bridge Street, Loddon, Norfolk, England. The structure, which is currently occupied for commercial use, is a grade II listed building.

== History ==
In the mid-19th century, a group of local businessmen decided to form a company to raise funds for the erection of an events venue in the town: the site they selected on the west side of Bridge Street was owned by an individual, James Copeman, from whom they bought it for £30. The building was designed in the Jacobean style, built in red brick and was completed in time for the first court hearing on 10 August 1870.

The design involved a symmetrical main frontage with three bays facing onto Bridge Street with the outer bays projected forward as pavilions; the central bay featured a round headed doorway flanked by banded pilasters supporting a modillioned canopy while the outer bays contained mullioned and transomed bay windows with ornate parapets above. All three bays were surmounted by Dutch gables containing oculli and, in the case of the outer bays, decorated with finials. Internally, the principal room was the main assembly hall.

Petty session hearings were held in the building once a fortnight in the 19th century. The building was used for various public events including political meetings and, in March 1923, the first-class cricketer and local member of parliament, Michael Falcon, gave a speech there: Falcon lost his seat at the general election nine months later. During the Second World War, the building served as a civil defence report centre, as a recruiting post for ARP staff and as a first aid post; it also acted as an administration centre for children evacuated from London to families in the Norfolk area.

After the war the use of the building as an events venue declined and it was sold for commercial use: the company that had originally developed it was wound up in the 1960s. Following local government re-organisation in 1974, the building also became the offices of the local parish council. By the early 21st century part of the building was in use as a tourist information centre, but it also accommodated a local hairdressing salon. A programme of works to convert three of its rooms into additional guest accommodation for an adjacent public house, The Swan, was completed in August 2017.
