= Hales Hall =

Country house in Norfolk, England

Coordinates: 52.510039°N 1.491856°E

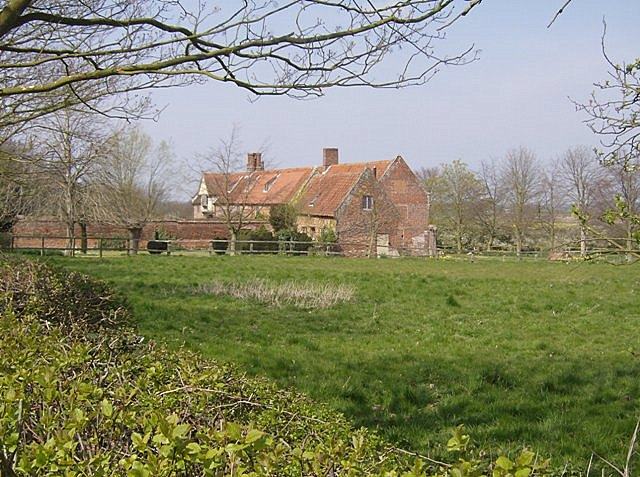
Hales Hall

Hales Hall is a notable English country house in Loddon, Norfolk, largely dating from the 15th century.

Hales Hall was built by and named for Sir Roger de Hales, a member of the Hales family who later became prominent in the county of Kent.

It was once the seat of the Hobart family, including Sir James Hobart, who became attorney general to King Henry VII in 1485.

== History ==
There has been a house on this site for some 1100 years with the remaining buildings being late medieval, including the outer gatehouse, stewards and guest lodgings and the largest brick medieval barn in Britain and built by Sir James Hobart in the late 1470s. A descendant of the same family would later build Blickling Hall in Norfolk. The barn is currently used as a reception hall.

== Occupants ==
Previous occupants include Sir Roger de Hales in the 13th century whose daughter Alice married Thomas de Brotherton, Edward II of England's half brother, and Lady Dionysius Williamson who gave £11,000 in the 1670s to help Christopher Wren rebuild London's churches after the great fire in 1666.
