= Ellingham, Norfolk =

Village in Norfolk, England

Coordinates: 52.483°N 1.482°E

Ellingham
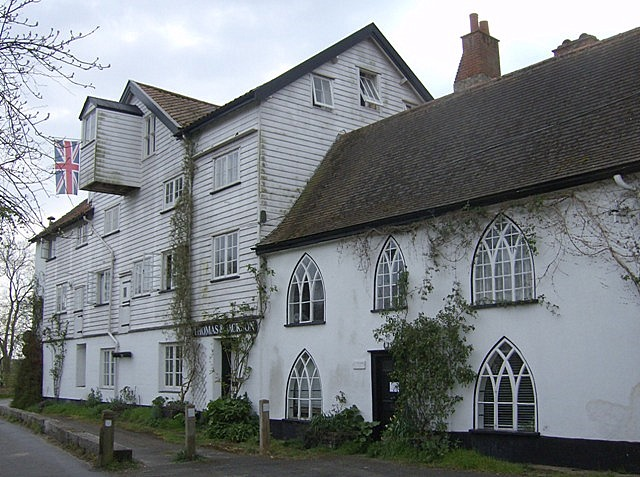
- Ellingham Mill

- Location within Norfolk
- Area: 2.16 sq mi (5.6 km^{2})
- Population: 554
  - Density: 256/sq mi (99/km^{2})
- OS grid reference: TM365929
  - London: 95 miles (153 km)
- Civil parish: Ellingham
- District: South Norfolk
- Shire county: Norfolk
- Region: East
- Country: England
- Sovereign state: United Kingdom
- Post town: BUNGAY
- Postcode district: NR35
- Dialling code: 01508
- UK Parliament: Waveney Valley
- Website: www.kce-pc.gov.uk

Ellingham is a village and civil parish in the English county of Norfolk. The village lies about 2.3 miles (3.7 km) north-east of Bungay and 13 miles (21 km) south-east of Norwich, along the River Waveney. Ellingham village is in the north-east, on the boundary with Kirby Cane village, and the two villages are now contiguous.

== History ==
Ellingham's name is of Anglo-Saxon origin and derives from the Old English for either Ella's homestead or village, or a settlement with an abundance of eels.

Archaeological evidence suggests that Ellingham was the site of several roughly five Roman kilns. One of them was operated by Regalis, who moved to the parish from Camulodunum.

In the Domesday Book, Ellingham is listed as a settlement of 31 households in the hundred of Clavering. In 1086, the village was part of the East Anglian estates of King William I.

Ellingham Mill was in operation from the 12th century to 1964, grinding crops into either flour or animal feed. The 18th-century building and attached Mill House still stand. The mill was owned and operated by Hovis from 1947 to 1949.

Ellingham railway station opened in 1863 as a stop on the Waveney Valley Line between Tivetshall and Beccles, which ran to the south of the village; the line closed in 1965.

Modern maps show Kirby Row as an area in the south of Ellingham village, around Mill Lane. As recently as 1957, Kirby Row was the name of the settlement now known as Kirby Cane.

Ellingham was the site of the discovery of mid-17th century firearm. A pillbox was installed on the bridge crossing the River Waveney during the Second World War.

== Geography ==
At the 2021 census, Ellingham had a population of 602, an increase from the 554 listed in the 2011 census.

The parish is bisected by the A143 road between Great Yarmouth and Haverhill. Until Broome and Ellingham were bypassed in 2002, the main road ran along the street that formed the boundary between Ellingham and Kirby Cane.

== St. Mary's Church ==
Ellingham's parish church is dedicated to Saint Mary and dates from the 19th century. St. Mary's is on Geldeston Road, some way south of the modern village, and has been Grade I listed since 1960.

St. Mary's has good examples of 19th and 20th-century stained glass depicting the Annunciation, Christ the Shepherd and the Parable of the Sower with St. Mary's tower in the background, installed by Reginald Bell with further depictions of the Adoration of the Magi by Charles Eamer Kempe and Naomi and Ruth by Ward and Hughes.

== Ellingham Hall ==
Ellingham Hall is an 18th-century manor house built in the Georgian style, first inhabited Rev. William Johnson. Today, the hall operates as an organic farm, wedding venue and shooting venue.

== Notable residents ==
- Vaughan Smith (born 1963), soldier, farmer and journalist, lived in Ellingham Hall
- Julian Assange (born 1971), Australian publisher and activist, lived in Ellingham Hall

== Governance ==
Kirby Cane & Ellingham Parish Council covers the two adjacent civil parishes. For elections to South Norfolk District Council, Ellingham is part of the electoral ward of Ditchingham & Earsham. For Westminster elections, following boundary changes that came into effect in 2024, the area is part of the Waveney Valley constituency which is represented by Adrian Ramsay of the Green Party.

== War Memorial ==
Ellingham War Memorial is a stone Latin-cross in St. Mary's Churchyard. The memorial lists the following names for the First World War:

Rank	Name	Unit	Date of death	Burial/Commemoration
LSgt.	Leonard A. Watson	9th Bn., Norfolk Regiment	24 Mar. 1918	Étaples Military Cemetery
LCpl.	George W. Norman	6th Bn., Royal Dublin Fusiliers	8 Oct. 1918	Templeux-le-Guérard Cem.
LCpl.	Samuel J. Cossey	Royal Marines att. HMS Lion	31 May 1916	Plymouth Naval Memorial
LCpl.	Nelson V. Cossey	3rd Bn., Rifle Brigade	24 Feb. 1916	Étaples Military Cemetery
LCpl.	Albert E. Hood	7th Bn., Suffolk Regiment	15 Oct. 1916	Heilly Station Cemetery
Gnr.	K. William Ward	C Bty., Royal Horse Artillery	10 Oct. 1918	Highland Cemetery
Pte.	Edgar C. Cossey	2nd Bn., Coldstream Guards	25 Aug. 1918	St. Hilaire Cemetery
Pte.	George Baldry	1/7th Bn., Middlesex Regiment	31 Aug. 1918	Vis-en-Artois Memorial
Pte.	George A. Shawl	7th Bn., Suffolk Regiment	22 Mar. 1916	Vermelles British Cemetery
Pte.	Leonard Everett	10th Bn., Yorkshire Regiment	3 Apr. 1917	Arras Memorial

The memorial also lists the following for the Second World War:

Rank	Name	Unit	Date of death	Burial/Commemoration
Dvr.	L. Stanley Rumsey	Royal Army Service Corps	21 Feb. 1947	St. Mary's Churchyard
Pte.	Alice M. Curtis	Auxiliary Territorial Service	6 Dec. 1941	St. Mary's Churchyard
Pte.	Raymond E. G. Burcham	4th Bn., Royal Norfolk Regiment	6 Aug. 1943	Sai Wan War Cemetery
Pte.	Edward H. Church	244th Coy., Royal Pioneer Corps	2 Dec. 1944	Schoonselhof Cemetery
Skpr.	Royal Arthur J. W. Page	H.M. Trawler Fir	3 Dec. 1942	Normanston Dv. Cemetery

== See also ==
- Clavering hundred
