= Roger Bigod =

Roger Bigod may refer to:

- Roger Bigod of Norfolk (died 1107), Norman knight who came to England with William the Conqueror; father of Hugh Bigod, 1st Earl of Norfolk
- Roger Bigod, 2nd Earl of Norfolk (c. 1144/1150–1221)
- Roger Bigod, 4th Earl of Norfolk (c. 1209–1270), Marshal of England
- Roger Bigod, 5th Earl of Norfolk (1245–1306)
