= James Hobart =

English royal official

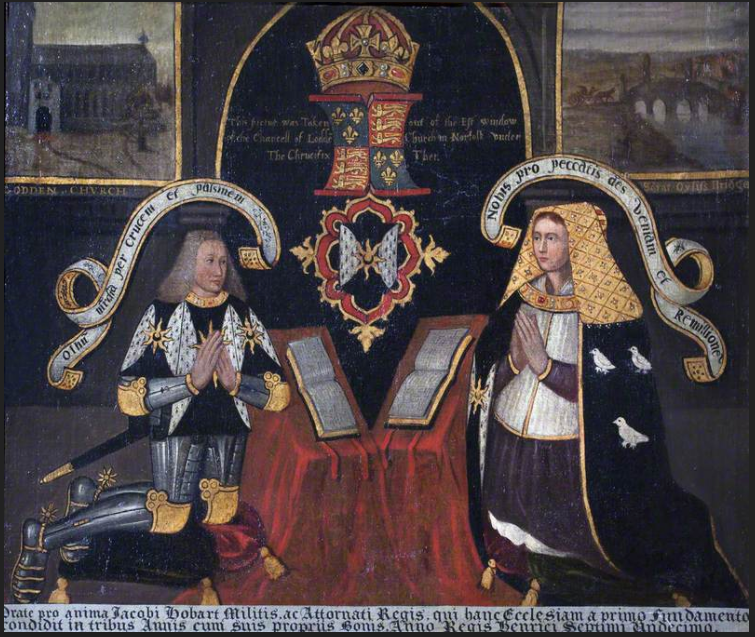
The kneeling figures of Sir James Hobart and his third wife, Lady Margaret Hobart. A copy of the east window in Holy Trinity Church, Loddon. Blickling Hall, National Trust.

Sir James Hobart, also known as James Hoberd and James Hubbard, (1436 – after 1507) of Norfolk became a member of Lincoln's Inn during Edward IV of England's reign and was appointed attorney-general and knighted during the reign of Henry VII.

== Career ==
Hobart became a member of Lincoln's Inn during Edward IV's reign. He performed some legal services for John Mowbray, duke of Norfolk and is likely the James Hoberd who went to parliament in 1467 and 1478, representing Ipswich. Hobart was elected Lent reader at his inn in 1479.

Henry VII appointed Hobart attorney-general on 1 November 1486. He then became a member of the privy council. Hobart was one of the men appointed to seize Calais for Henry VII and take possessions of the king and other townspeople.

Hobart assumed several responsibilities in 1487. He was made commissioner of array for Norfolk in April. Hobart, and others, were appointed to oversee the fisheries on the east coast. He also supervised the repair of the harbour in Yarmouth. He served on two commissions in 1489. One for gaol delivery for Ipswich and Norwich and the other for peace and oyer and terminer for Suffolk. Hobart was appointed to try a suit at York, when he is styled serjeant, in August 1501. He was knighted on 18 February 1502–3 by Henry, prince of Wales.

Hobart left the attorney general office in 1507 following a controversy involving writs of praemunire facias.

== Personal life ==
Hobart was the youngest son of Thomas Hobart of Leyham in Norfolk. Hobart married three times. John Lyhert's sister, Margery, was his first wife. The second was Dorothy Glemham. Margaret Naunton, the daughter of Peter Naunton of Letheringham, Suffolk, was his third wife. She died in 1494. His daughter Catherine (by which wife is not known) married Thomas Curzon (d. after 1610) of Beck Hall Manor in Norfolk.

Hobart lived at his home, Hales Hall in Norfolk. He was a good friend of John Paston and is often mentioned in the Paston Letters.

Hobart's chest-tomb is located in the nave of the Norwich Cathedral.

== Death date ==
The Dictionary of National Biography (1891) and other sources cite Hobart's death as in 1507, but Colin Richmond (2005) notes that his will was drawn up on 27 July 1516 and that he died in 1517. The confusion may be due to the statement from the Dictionary of National Biography, which says: "He continued in his office until his death in 1507." And, that there was a sudden resignation as attorney general by Hobart in 1507. But, Steven Gunn states that he resigned in 1507 and died ten years later, which synchs up with Richmond's mentioning of his 1516 will and 1517 death and others, like Gibson, who say that he died in 1517. Moreover, the Oxford Dictionary of National Biography provides the death as 24 February 1517.

== Holy Trinity Church ==
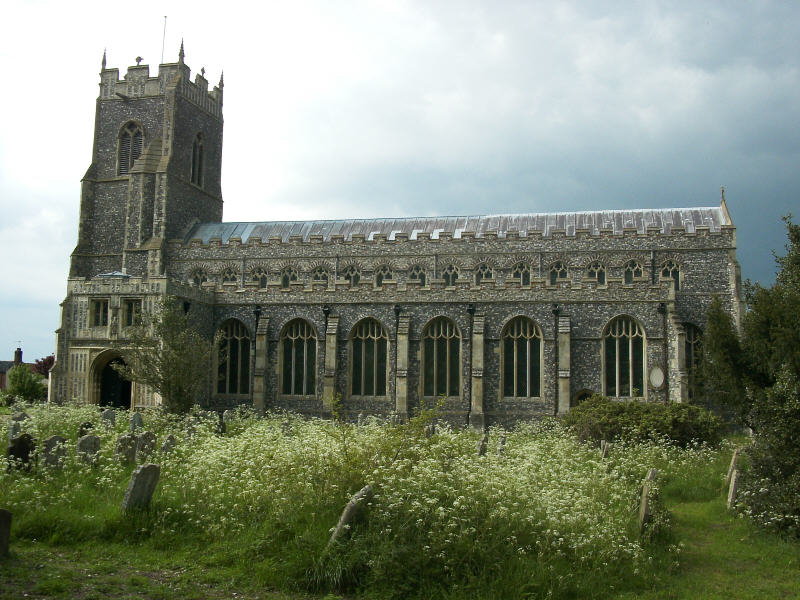
Holy Trinity Church, Loddon, Norfolk

Hobart erected "at his sole expense" the Holy Trinity Church at Loddon in 1490. A stained glass artwork, removed from the east window of the church and preserved as a painting, shows Hobart and Lady Margaret Hobart in prayer. A caption in Latin beneath them reads, Orate pro aia Jaci Hobart, milit. & attornati dmi regis, qui Hanc ecclesiam a primis fundamentis condidit in tribus annis cum suis propriis bonis, anno regis Henrici septimit undecimo. Roughly, it translates as "Pray for James Hobart, soldier and attorney general to the King, who contributed to the foundations of the Church in the eleventh year of King Henry VII."

== Sources ==
- This article incorporates text from a publication now in the public domain: Williams, James (1891). "Hobart, James". In Lee, Sidney (ed.). Dictionary of National Biography. Vol. 27. London: Smith, Elder & Co. p. 31.
