= Hobart High School, Norfolk =

Hobart High School

Location
- Kittens Lane; Loddon; Norwich, Norfolk, NR14 6JU; England
- Coordinates: 52°31′55″N 1°28′45″E

Information
- Type: Academy
- Trust: Clarion Academy Trust
- Department for Education URN: 139311 Tables
- Ofsted: Reports
- Chair: Peter Fraser
- Headteacher: Jed Beskin
- Staff: 60 (approx.)
- Gender: Coeducational
- Age: 11 to 16
- Enrolment: 665 pupils As of September 2020
- Capacity: 820
- Website: http://www.hobart.org.uk/

Hobart High School is a coeducational secondary school with academy status, situated in the village of Loddon, near Norwich in Norfolk, England. It typically has around 850 pupils.

The school previously had specialist science college status before converting to academy status in February 2013.

== Description ==
This is a small secondary school serving a wide area, accepting pupils from over 27 different primary schools. Before they became an academy in 2013 they already had a long tradition of successful Ofsted inspections.

== Academics ==
Virtually all maintained schools and academies follow the National Curriculum, and are inspected by Ofsted on how well they succeed in delivering a 'broad and balanced curriculum'.

The school operates a three-year, Key Stage 3 where all the core national curriculum subjects are taught. Year 7 and Year 8 study core subjects: English, Mathematics, Science. The following foundation subjects are offered: art, computing, technology, French, German, Spanish, geography and history, music and physical education.

For Key Stage 4, students start their GCSE studies at the beginning of Year 10. They follow a set of core courses: English Language, English Literature, Mathematics, Science all of which lead to a potential qualification. This core group of subjects is supported by four optional courses. Within the combination of subjects available students will have the chance to study for an English Baccalaureate qualification. Students must also attend PE and PSRE.
