= Shimpling, Norfolk =

Village in Norfolk, England

Coordinates: 52.404342°N 1.1629895°E

Shimpling
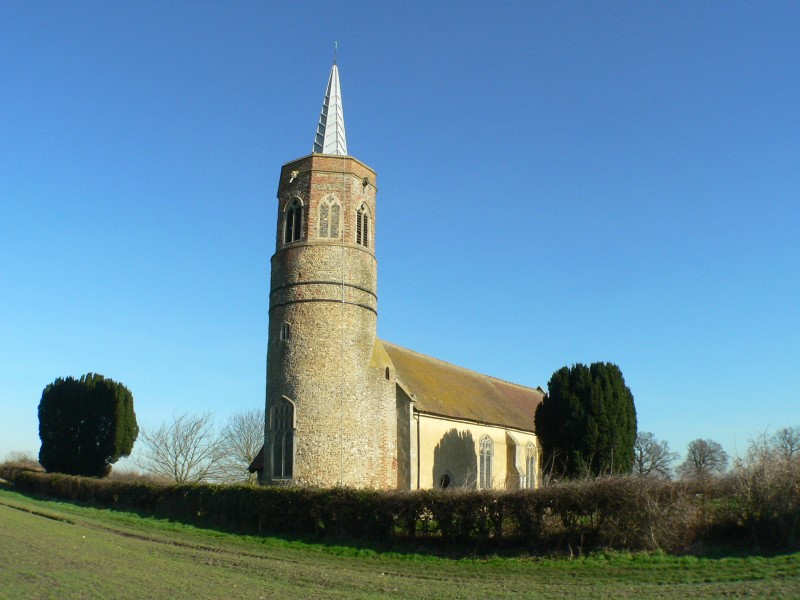
- St George's Church

- Location within Norfolk
- Civil parish: Burston and Shimpling
- District: South Norfolk
- Shire county: Norfolk
- Region: East
- Country: England
- Sovereign state: United Kingdom
- Post town: DISS
- Postcode district: IP21
- Dialling code: 01379
- Police: Norfolk
- Fire: Norfolk
- Ambulance: East of England

Shimpling is a village and former civil parish 16 miles (26 km) south of Norwich, now in the parish of Burston and Shimpling, in the South Norfolk district, in the county of Norfolk, England. The parish had a population of 134 in 1931.

== Amenities ==
Shimpling has a church called St George. It is one of 124 round tower churches in Norfolk and now redundant. It is in the care of the Churches Conservation Trust.

== Location ==
Historically, Shimpling was bounded on the east by Dickleburgh, on the west by Burston, on the south by Thelton, and on the north by Gissing. These divisions largely remain.

== History ==
The name "Shimpling" is Old English and means 'Scimpel's people'. Shimpling was recorded in the Domesday Book as Simplinga(ham). On 1 April 1935 the parish was abolished and merged with Burston.
