= St Andrew's Church, Frenze =

Coordinates: 52.3802°N 1.1361°E

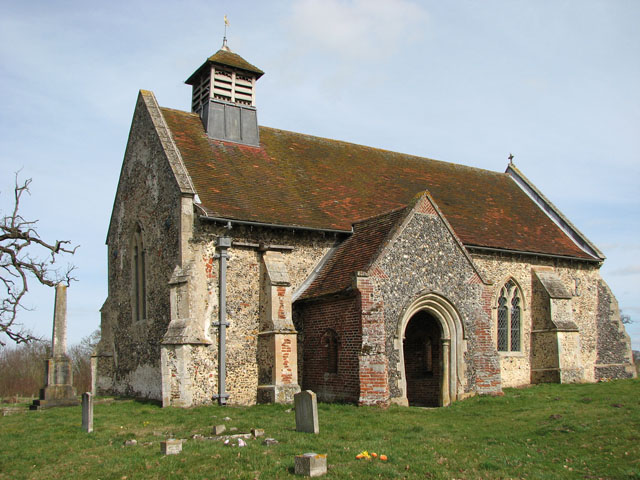
- St Andrew's Church, Frenze, from the southwest

- Location in Norfolk
- OS grid reference: TM 136 804
- Location: Frenze, Norfolk
- Country: England
- Denomination: Anglican
- Website: Churches Conservation Trust

History
- Dedication: Saint Andrew

Architecture
- Functional status: Redundant
- Heritage designation: Grade I
- Designated: 7 December 1959
- Architectural type: Church
- Style: Gothic, Tudor

Specifications
- Materials: Stone with tiled roof Brick porch

St Andrew's Church is a redundant Anglican church in the civil parish of Scole, Norfolk, England. It is recorded in the National Heritage List for England as a designated Grade I listed building, and is under the care of the Churches Conservation Trust. The church stands in an isolated position adjacent to Frenze Hall, near to the long-distance footpath, Boudica's Way (Boudicca Way), 1 mile (1.6 km) northeast of Diss.

== History ==
The church was built in the early 14th century, and the south porch was added in the early 16th century. A bellcote was built at a later date. Although the church is now redundant, services and other events are held occasionally.

== Architecture ==
The body of the church is constructed in stone and consists of a nave without a chancel. The east window has three lights, and the windows in the north, south and west walls have two lights. The gabled porch is brick and is in Tudor style. It is supported by buttresses, and has two-light windows with brick mullions in the side walls. The bellcote sits on the ridge towards the west end of the church.

Inside the church is a large Jacobean pulpit with a tester dating from the early 17th century. Dating from the same period is a manorial box pew. Some of the benches date from the 15th century, and one of these is carved with tracery and poppyheads on its ends. The font is octagonal and dates from the 14th century. Above the south door is a Royal coat of arms. There are two piscinae, one on each side of the church. The church contains seven brasses, most in memory of members of the Blennerhassett family. The oldest is dated 1475, and others date from the early 16th century. The single bell was cast in 1707 by Joseph Goldsmith.

One of the curates here was a young George Wilson Bridges who went on to some controversy.

== See also ==
- List of churches preserved by the Churches Conservation Trust in the East of England
