= Chedgrave =

Village and civil parish in Norfolk, England

Coordinates: 52.54167°N 1.48667°E

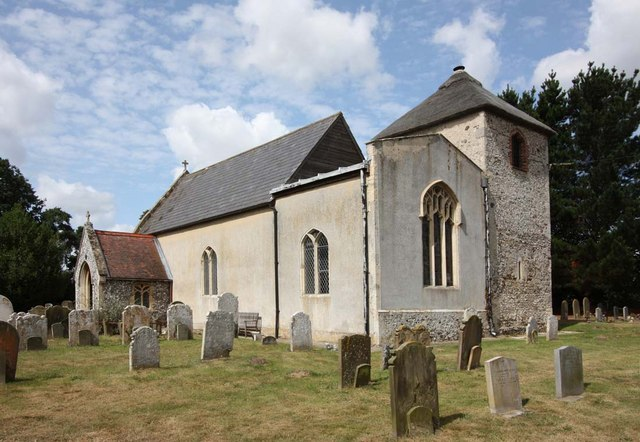
- All Saints' Church

- Location within Norfolk
- Area: 3.52 km^{2} (1.36 sq mi)
- Population: 1,052 (2021)
  - Density: 299/km^{2} (770/sq mi)
- OS grid reference: TM364995
- Civil parish: Chedgrave
- District: South Norfolk
- Shire county: Norfolk
- Region: East
- Country: England
- Sovereign state: United Kingdom
- Post town: NORWICH
- Postcode district: NR14
- Dialling code: 01508
- Police: Norfolk
- Fire: Norfolk
- Ambulance: East of England
- UK Parliament: South Norfolk

Chedgrave is a village and civil parish in English county of Norfolk.

Chedgrave is located 0.4 miles (0.64 km) north of Loddon, separated by the River Chet, and 9.6 miles (15.4 km) south-east of Norfolk.

== History ==
Chedgrave's name is of Anglo-Saxon origin and likely derives from the Old English for Ceatta's pit or grove.

In the Domesday Book, Chedgrave is described as consisting of 73 households located in the hundred of Loddon. In 1086, the village was part of the estates of Ralph Baynard.

== Geography ==
According to the 2021 census, Chedgrave has a population of 1,052 people which shows a minor increase from the 1,051 people recorded in the 2011 census.

Chedgrave is located along the course of the River Chet with the A146, between Norwich and Lowestoft, passing through the parish.

== All Saints' Church ==
Chedgrave's parish church is a tower-less church dating from the Twelfth Century, located on Hardley Road which has been Grade I listed since 1960.

All Saints' was heavily restored in both the Georgian and Victorian eras as well as having a brick extension built in the 1990s. The church features an oak door dated to 1819 as well as Continental stained-glass windows which were allegedly extracted from Rouen Cathedral after the French Revolution.

All Saints' Church features a memorial to General John Barrett of the British Indian Army who died on 15th October 1880 in Rawalpindi, Punjab.

== Windmills ==
Two derelict windmills stand in a detached part of Chedgrave parish. Both drained the marshes into the River Yare. They are Pettingell's, or Seven Mile House Mill, and Six Mile House Mill.

== Governance ==
Chedgrave is part of the electoral ward of Loddon & Chedgrave for local elections and is part of the district of South Norfolk.

The village's national constituency is South Norfolk which has been represented by the Labour's Ben Goldsborough MP since 2024.

== War memorial ==
Chedgrave's war memorials are two marble plaques inside All Saints' Church. The memorial lists the following names for the First World War:

| Rank | Name | Unit | Date of death | Burial |
|---|---|---|---|---|
| Gnr. | Edward G. H. Beckham | 228th Bty., Royal Garrison Artillery | 31 Jul. 1917 | Klein Cemetery |
| Pte. | Free H. Easter | 1/9th Bn., Durham Light Infantry | 16 Jan. 1917 | Peronne Rd. Cemetery |
| Pte. | James J. Fuller | 4th Bn., Yorkshire Regiment | 11 Nov. 1917 | Longuenesse Cemetery |

And, the following for the Second World War:

| Rank | Name | Unit | Date of death | Burial |
|---|---|---|---|---|
| AG2 | Robert R. Goulty | Royal Air Force Volunteer Reserve | 1 Nov. 1943 | Ambon War Cemetery |
| Pte. | Stanley D. Goodyear | 4th Bn., Dorsetshire Regiment | 2 Aug. 1944 | Hottot-les-Bagues Cemetery |
| Pte. | Harry A. Seamons | 4th Bn., Royal Norfolk Regiment | 11 Feb. 1942 | Kranji War Memorial |
| Pte. | Albert E. H. Starman | 4th Bn., Royal Norfolks. | 21 Sep. 1944 (Note: Starman was killed in the sinking of Japanese POW Ship Toyofoku Maru by aircraft of the United States Navy.) | Kranji War Memorial |
