= Vermelles British Cemetery =

World War I cemetery in Pas-de-Calais, France

Coordinates: 50°29′10″N 2°44′25″E

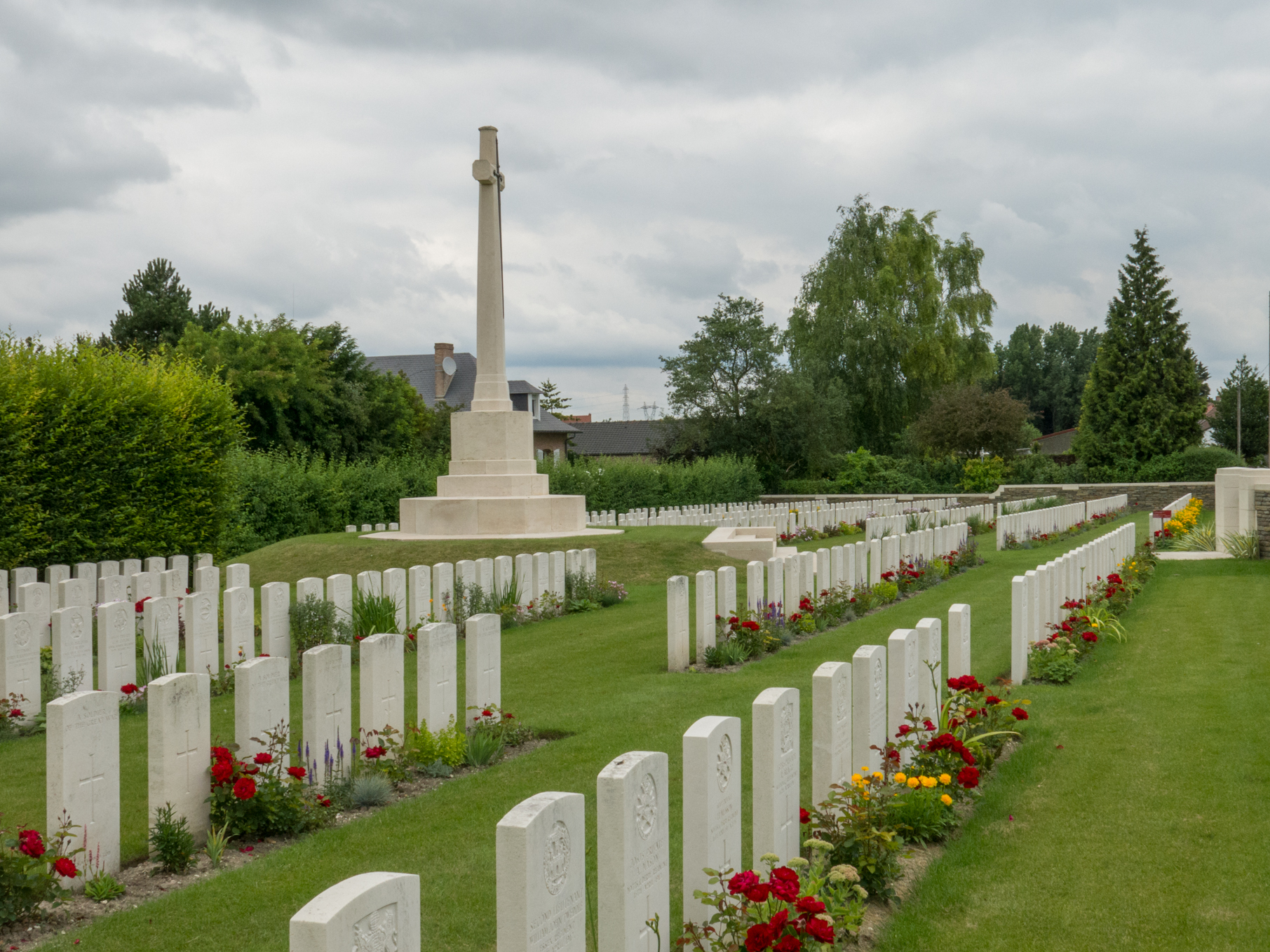
Vermelles British Cemetery

Vermelles British Cemetery is a First World War British war cemetery at Vermelles, a village 10 kilometres north-west of Lens, Pas-de-Calais. The cemetery was designed by Sir Herbert Baker and contains the memorials to 2145 casualties.
