= Kirby Cane =

Village in Norfolk, England

Coordinates: 52.493°N 1.494°E

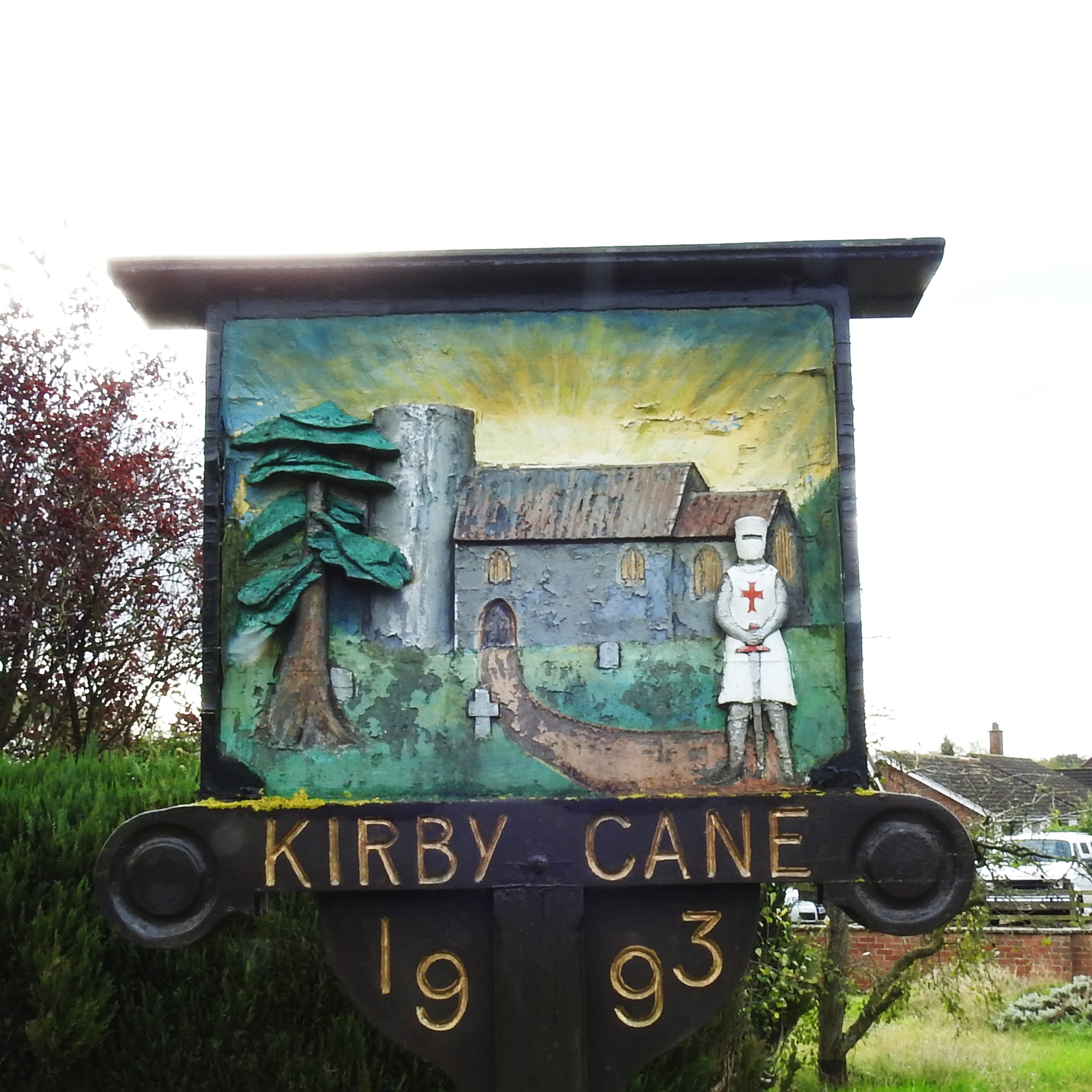
- Kirby Cane village sign

- Location within Norfolk
- Area: 3.78 sq mi (9.8 km^{2})
- Population: 449
  - Density: 119/sq mi (46/km^{2})
- OS grid reference: TM373941
- Civil parish: Kirby Cane
- District: South Norfolk
- Shire county: Norfolk
- Region: East
- Country: England
- Sovereign state: United Kingdom
- Post town: BUNGAY
- Postcode district: NR35
- Dialling code: 01508
- Police: Norfolk
- Fire: Norfolk
- Ambulance: East of England
- UK Parliament: Waveney Valley
- Website: kirbycaneandellingham.uk

Kirby Cane is a village and civil parish in the English county of Norfolk. The village lies about 3.8 miles (6.1 km) north-west of Beccles and 14 miles (23 km) south-east of Norwich, along the River Waveney.

The village is in the south of the parish and is contiguous with Ellingham village. The parish also includes the hamlet of Kirby Green.

== Etymology ==
The name Kirby is derived from the Old Norse kirkju-býr meaning "village with a church". Cane refers to a family which historically held the estate.

== History ==
In the Domesday Book, Kirby Cane is listed as a settlement of 28 households in the hundred of Clavering. In 1086, the village was divided between the East Anglian estates of Hugh d'Avranches, Earl of Chester, St Edmunds Abbey and Ralph Baynard.

The red-brick Kirby Cane Hall was built in the 17th century and remodelled in the 18th and 19th centuries.

During the Second World War, several trenches were built close to Kirby Cane Hall which suggests it was used as a training area.

The 1957 Ordnance Survey map shows Kirby Cane as the name of the parish, and labels the area around the Hall and the church as Kirby Cane; the settlement further south, next to Ellingham, is labelled Kirby Row. On present-day maps, this settlement is labelled Kirby Cane.

== Geography ==
According to the 2021 census, Kirby Cane has a total population of 449 people which demonstrates an increase from the 434 people listed in the 2011 census.

== All Saints' Church ==
Kirby Cane's parish church dates from the medieval period and is one of Norfolk's 124 remaining round-tower churches. All Saints' is on Wash Lane, towards the north of the parish, and has been Grade I listed since 1960. The church is open once a month for Sunday service and is part of the Waveney Marshlands Benefice.

All Saints' has a 14th-century font and a brass memorial plaque.

== Governance ==
The first tier of local government is Kirby Cane & Ellingham Parish Council.

Kirby Cane is part of the electoral ward of Ditchingham & Earsham for local elections and is part of the district of South Norfolk.

The village's national constituency is Waveney Valley which has been represented by the Green Party's Adrian Ramsay MP since 2024.

== War Memorial ==
Kirby Cane's war memorial is a set of marble plaques in All Saints' Church which lists the following names for the First World War:

Rank	Name	Unit	Date of death	Burial/Commemoration
LSjt.	Hubert Strowger	2nd Bn., Norfolk Regiment	31 Dec. 1916	Basra Memorial
LSjt.	Leonard A. Watson	9th Bn., Norfolk Regt.	24 Mar. 1918	Étaples Military Cemetery
Pte.	William C. Buck	9th Bn., Essex Regiment	14 Nov. 1916	Faubourg Cemetery
Pte.	Percy F. Buck	1st Bn., Norfolk Regiment	4 Sep. 1916	Thiepval Memorial
Pte.	Charles Buck	2nd Bn., Norfolk Regt.	16 Apr. 1917	Kirkee War Memorial
Pte.	Albert Grimwood	22nd Bn., Northumberland Fusiliers	11 Apr. 1918	Ploegsteert Memorial
Dhd.	Arthur Baldry	HMS Pembroke	9 Aug. 1916	All Saints' Churchyard

The following names were added after the Second World War:

Rank	Name	Unit	Date of death	Burial/Commemoration
LSt.	John C. Sutton	HMS Lightning (Destroyer)	12 Mar. 1943	Chatham Naval Memorial
LTel.	Ieuan L. G. Winchester	HMS Arethusa (Cruiser)	18 Nov. 1942	Chatham Naval Memorial
Pte.	Frederick Spurgeon	2/21st Bn., AIF	20 Feb. 1942	Ambon Memorial
Pte.	Jeremiah W. Brister	2/5th Bn., Leicestershire Regiment	30 Aug. 1944	Montecchio War Cemetery
Pte.	Alfred F. Ward	2nd Bn., Royal Norfolk Regiment	10 May 1940	Le Paradis Cemetery

== See also ==
- Clavering hundred
