= Thurlton =

Village in Norfolk, England

Coordinates: 52.5287°N 1.56349°E

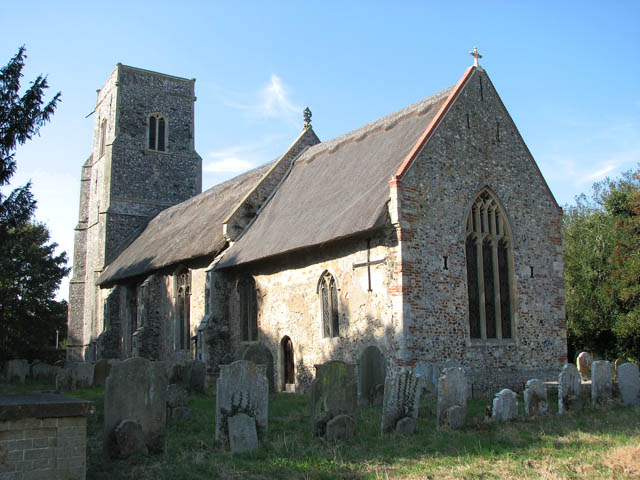
- Church of All Saints, Thurlton

- Location within Norfolk
- Area: 5.22 km^{2} (2.02 sq mi)
- Population: 779 (2011)
  - Density: 149/km^{2} (390/sq mi)
- OS grid reference: TM418982
- District: South Norfolk
- Shire county: Norfolk
- Region: East
- Country: England
- Sovereign state: United Kingdom
- Post town: NORWICH
- Postcode district: NR14
- Dialling code: 01508
- Police: Norfolk
- Fire: Norfolk
- Ambulance: East of England
- Website: http://eoe.xarg.co.uk/thurlton/

Thurlton is a small village in South Norfolk, located 14 miles (22 km) south-east of the city of Norwich, and 9 miles (15 km) west of the Suffolk coastal town of Lowestoft.

The villages name means 'Thorferth's farm/settlement'.

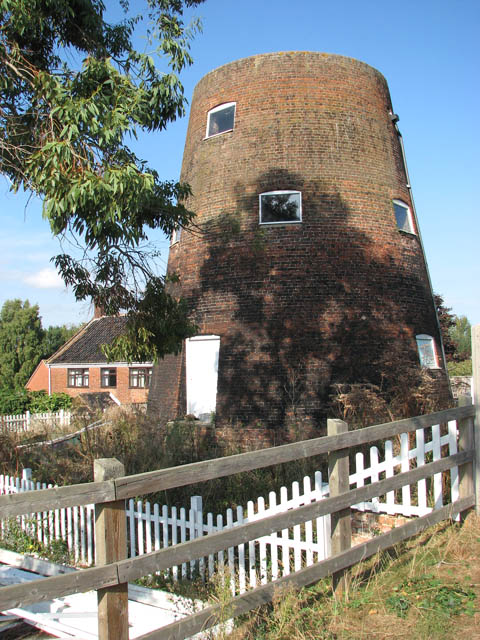
Great Goliath Mill

Thurlton is on the edge of the Broadland marshes to the south of the River Yare, and is bordered by Norton Subcourse to the west of the river. The population of the parish at the 2001 census was 720, increasing to 779 at the 2011 Census. The area around the village is mainly agricultural.

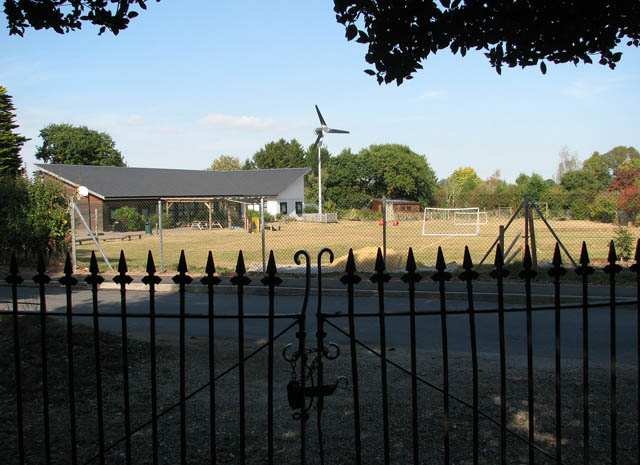
Wind turbine at Thurlton Primary School

Thurlton is home to the Great Goliath Mill, a brick built windmill. The village has basic amenities, including a pub, shop and post office. Thurlton Primary School has about 100 pupils, including a ‘classroom of the future’ extension, complete with a wind turbine.

== See also ==
- Clavering hundred

== Governance ==
An electoral ward in the same name exists. This ward stretches south east to Aldeby with a total population of 2,726.
