= St George's Church, Shimpling =

Coordinates: 52.3993°N 1.1680°E

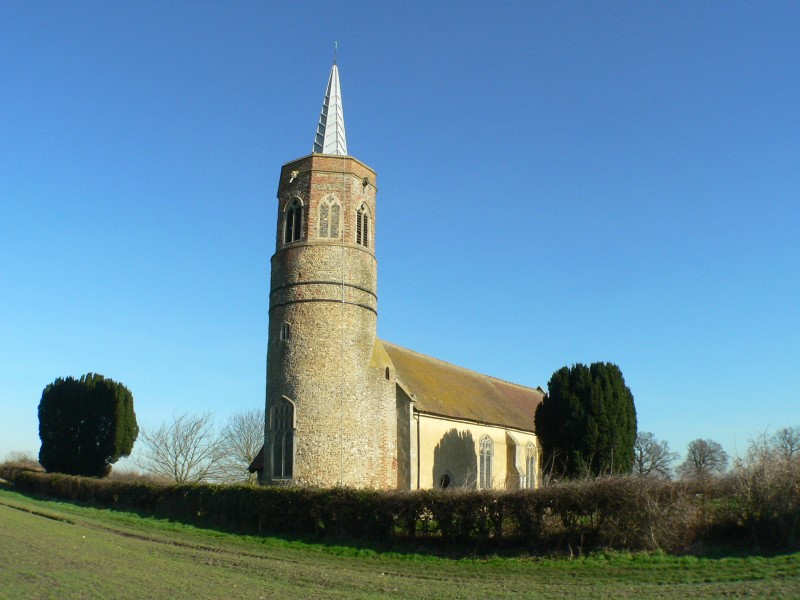
- St George's Church, Shimpling, from the southwest

- Location in Norfolk
- OS grid reference: TM 156 826
- Location: Shimpling, Norfolk
- Country: England
- Denomination: Anglican
- Website: Churches Conservation Trust

History
- Dedication: Saint George

Architecture
- Functional status: Redundant
- Heritage designation: Grade I
- Designated: 7 December 1959
- Architectural type: Church
- Style: Norman, Gothic

Specifications
- Materials: Flint with stone dressings Tiled roofs

St George's Church is a redundant Anglican church in the village of Shimpling, Norfolk, England. It is recorded in the National Heritage List for England as a designated Grade I listed building, and is under the care of the Churches Conservation Trust. It stands at the end of a short lane to the south of the village.

== History ==
The lower part of the tower and the nave date from the 12th century. During the following century an octagonal top was added to the tower and the chancel was built.^{[A]} In the 15th century the original windows in the nave were replaced. The chancel roof was replaced in 1633. The church was restored between 1867 and 1874 by E. C. Lee. During the restoration a small spire was added to the top of the tower, and the north porch was replaced. The church closed in 1987.

== Architecture ==
=== Exterior ===
St George's is constructed in flint with stone dressings and tiled roofs. Parts of the exterior have been rendered. The porch is timber-framed with brick nogging and carved bargeboards. The plan of the church is simple, consisting of a nave with a north porch, a chancel and a west tower. The lower part of the tower is round and the upper part is octagonal. In the upper part are bell openings on each of the four cardinal faces, with similar but blank windows on the faces between. On top of the tower is a lead-covered spirelet. The windows in the chancel are Early English with Y-tracery, and those in the nave are in Perpendicular style.

=== Interior ===
The tie beam of the chancel roof is inscribed with the date 1633 and initials. The benches in the nave are a mixture; some carved with poppyheads (and one with pierced tracery) date from the 15th century, and the rest are from the 19th century. Under the tower arch are the remains of a screen. The font dates from the 15th century. Its octagonal bowl is carved with the symbols of the Four Evangelists, alternating with angels holding the Instruments of the Passion. Beneath the bowl are more angels, and the stem is surrounded by carved lions. All the furniture in the chancel is Victorian, and in the chancel is a dropped sill below the south window which acts as a sedilia. Although much of the stained glass has been destroyed, some dating from the late 13th or early 14th century in the chancel, and from the 15th century in the north nave windows, is still present. Until 1920 there was a ring of four bells, three of which remain. Two of the remaining bells date from 1552, the third was recast in 1658 and the fourth was sold in 1920, recorded as "cracked beyond the memory of man".

== See also ==
- List of churches preserved by the Churches Conservation Trust in the East of England

== Notes ==
^{A} There is an alternative theory on the dating of the tower, which argues that the tower was built as a whole in the 14th century. (Hart, Stephen (2003), The Round Church Towers of England, Lucas Books) quoted in.
