= Norton Subcourse =

Village in Norfolk, England

Coordinates: 52.53178°N 1.55655°E

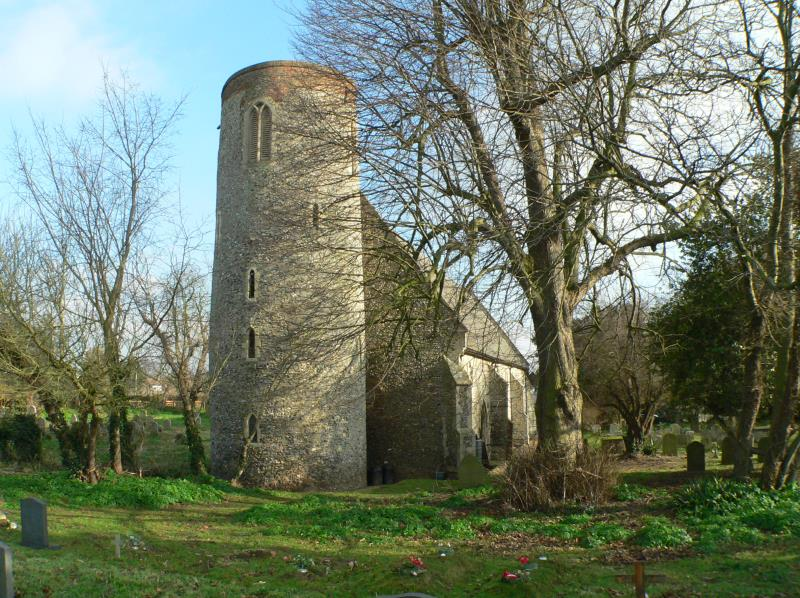
- St Mary's church

- Location within Norfolk
- Area: 9.05 km^{2} (3.49 sq mi)
- Population: 298 (2011)
  - Density: 33/km^{2} (85/sq mi)
- OS grid reference: TM413985
- Civil parish: Norton Subcourse
- District: South Norfolk
- Shire county: Norfolk
- Region: East
- Country: England
- Sovereign state: United Kingdom
- Post town: NORWICH
- Postcode district: NR14
- Dialling code: 01508
- Police: Norfolk
- Fire: Norfolk
- Ambulance: East of England

Norton Subcourse is a small village and parish in the county of Norfolk, England, about 9 miles (14 km) south-west of Great Yarmouth. It covers an area of 2,233 acres (904 ha) and had a population of 303 in 115 households at the 2001 census, reducing to a population of 298 in 119 households at the 2011 Census.

The name of the village means 'North farm/settlement'. The village was held by the Subcourse family, possibly a corruption of 'Surlecors'.

The village church, St Mary, is one of 124 existing round-tower churches in Norfolk.

Norton Subcourse is mentioned in the Domesday Book as one of the settlements in Clavering hundred.

There are two windmills in Norton Subcourse, both drainage mills. Boyce's Mill is a derelict two storey stump. Norton Marshes mill has been converted to holiday accommodation.
