= Thurton =

Village in Norfolk, England

Coordinates: 52.557°N 1.435°E

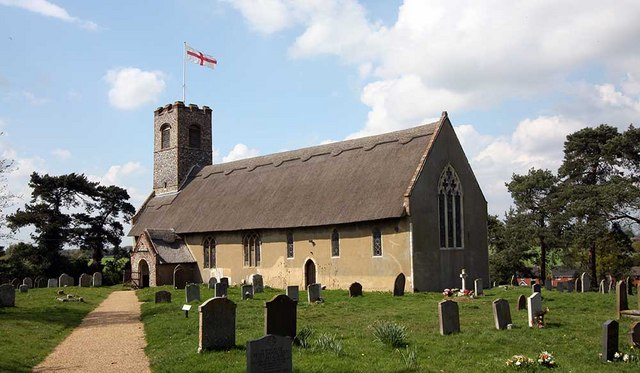
- St Ethelbert, Thurton

- Location within Norfolk
- Area: 3.18 km^{2} (1.23 sq mi)
- Population: 567 (2011)
  - Density: 178/km^{2} (460/sq mi)
- OS grid reference: TG327010
- District: South Norfolk
- Shire county: Norfolk
- Region: East
- Country: England
- Sovereign state: United Kingdom
- Post town: NORWICH
- Postcode district: NR14
- Dialling code: 01508
- Police: Norfolk
- Fire: Norfolk
- Ambulance: East of England

Thurton is a village in South Norfolk lying 8½ miles (13½ km) south-east of Norwich on the A146 Norwich to Lowestoft road between Framingham Pigot and Loddon. The A146 effectively divides the village in two; a 40 mph limit is in force. At the 2001 census and the 2011 Census Thurton had 223 households and a population of 567.

Thurton is written 'Tortuna' in the Domesday Book. The suffix is the Anglo-Saxon 'tun', meaning an enclosed space. The prefix may refer to a thorn bush, or perhaps to the Anglo-Saxon god Thunor, whom the Normans called Thur. So Thurton may mean 'the place of the thorn bush' or 'Thor's enclosure'.

The village no longer has a shop, post office or garage, all having closed. It has a pub, the George and Dragon which has darts and pool teams and sponsors the football team. It also provides the focus for the village's annual St George's Day celebrations and is often host to local bands. Opposite the pub is Thurton Foundry which was founded in 1963 and produces ferrous and non-ferrous castings. The village hosts a large classic car show and autojumble annually which raises significant money for local charities.

The thatched parish church stands on a hill to the south of the village and is dedicated to St Ethelbert. Parts date from the Norman period. Thurton Primary School has around 90 children between the ages of 4–11.
