= Alpington =

Village in Norfolk, England

Coordinates: 52.566°N 1.383°E

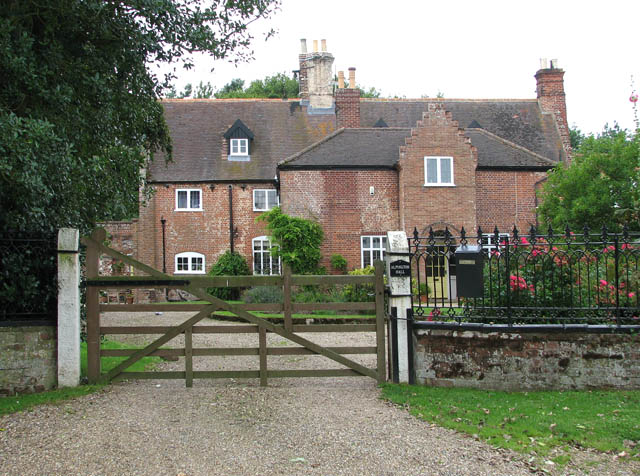
- Alpington Hall

- Location within Norfolk
- Area: 2.18 km^{2} (0.84 sq mi)
- Population: 477 (2011 census)
  - Density: 219/km^{2} (570/sq mi)
- OS grid reference: TG294018
- District: South Norfolk
- Shire county: Norfolk
- Region: East
- Country: England
- Sovereign state: United Kingdom
- Post town: NORWICH
- Postcode district: NR14
- Police: Norfolk
- Fire: Norfolk
- Ambulance: East of England

Alpington is a village and civil parish in the English county of Norfolk. It is about 6 miles (9.7 km) south-east of Norwich and is closely associated with Yelverton just to the north.

There is some confusion over Alpington's entries in the Domesday Book. Two entries call the village 'Appletuna' or 'Appletona', Old English for 'apple tree farm'. However, two further entries use the names 'Algamundestuna' and 'Alcmuntona', Old English for 'Ahlmund's enclosure'. These may relate to Alpington or to an unknown settlement close by. Ekwall suggests that it is "not impossible" that Apton, formerly part of the adjacent parish of Bergh Apton, is a reduced form of Appleton. So Apton may be linked to Alpington.

The civil parish has an area of 2.18 square kilometres (0.84 sq mi) and in the 2001 census had a population of 460 in 199 households, increasing to 477 at the 2011 Census. For the purposes of local government, the parish falls within the district of South Norfolk. A single parish council serves the two parishes of Alpington and Yelverton.

The village has a village hall, primary school and a pub, the 'Wheel of Fortune'.

== Notable residents ==
- British tennis-player Richard Bloomfield is from Alpington.
