= Yelverton, Norfolk =

Village in Norfolk, England

Coordinates: 52.56747°N 1.38203°E

Yelverton
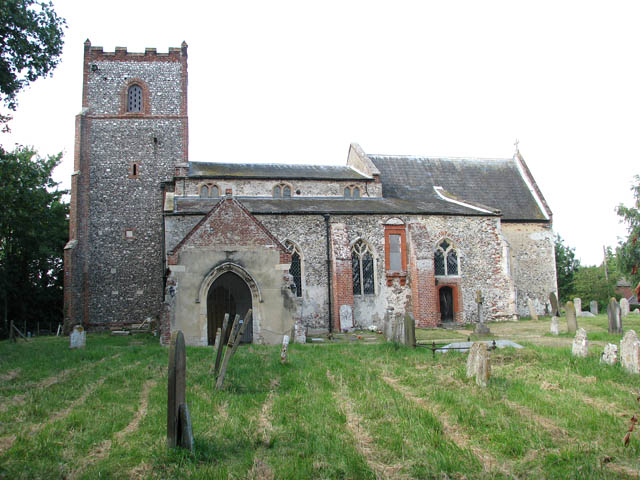
- St Mary's church, Yelverton

- Location within Norfolk
- Area: 2.21 km^{2} (0.85 sq mi)
- Population: 173 (2011 census)
  - Density: 78/km^{2} (200/sq mi)
- OS grid reference: TG293020
- Civil parish: Yelverton
- District: South Norfolk
- Shire county: Norfolk
- Region: East
- Country: England
- Sovereign state: United Kingdom
- Post town: NORWICH
- Postcode district: NR14
- Dialling code: 01508
- Police: Norfolk
- Fire: Norfolk
- Ambulance: East of England

Yelverton is a village and civil parish in the English county of Norfolk, situated some 5 miles (8.0 km) south east of Norwich and closely associated with Alpington.

The villages name probably means 'Geldfrith's farm/settlement'.

The civil parish has an area of 2.21 km^{2} (0.85 sq mi) and had a population of 186 in 62 households in the 2001 census, the population falling to 173 at the 2011 Census. For the purposes of local government, the parish falls within the district of South Norfolk. A single parish council serves the two parishes of Alpington and Yelverton.

The village itself is just south of the A146 (on which lies Yelverton Garage) and is contiguous with Alpington to the south with which it shares its facilities, which include a duckpond, village hall and St. Mary's church.

== Notes ==
- Ordnance Survey (2005). OS Explorer Map OL40 - The Broads. ISBN 0-319-23769-9.
- Office for National Statistics & Norfolk County Council (2001). Census population and household counts for unparished urban areas and all parishes. Retrieved 2 December 2005.
