= Loddon, Norfolk =

Town in Norfolk, England

Coordinates: 52.533°N 1.483°E

Loddon
- Location within Norfolk
- Area: 11.83 km^{2} (4.57 sq mi)
- Population: 2,648 (2011 census)
  - Density: 224/km^{2} (580/sq mi)
- OS grid reference: TM362985
- District: South Norfolk
- Shire county: Norfolk
- Region: East
- Country: England
- Sovereign state: United Kingdom
- Post town: NORWICH
- Postcode district: NR14
- Dialling code: 01508
- Police: Norfolk
- Fire: Norfolk
- Ambulance: East of England
- UK Parliament: South Norfolk

Loddon (/ˈlɒd(ə)n/) is a town and civil parish in Norfolk, England, about 12 miles (19 km) south-east of Norwich. The town lies on the River Chet, a tributary of the River Yare within The Broads. The name "Loddon" is thought to mean muddy river in Celtic in reference to the Chet.

== History ==
=== Origins ===
The earliest written mention of Loddon (Lodne) is in the will of Ælfric Modercope written in 1042 or 1043. In the will Ælfric split his land holdings in Loddon, Bergh Apton and Barton between the Bishops of Bury, Ely and St Benet of Holme. Ælfric held 450 acres (1.8 km^{2}) of land in Loddon and was by far the biggest landowner. His manor house is believed to have been close by the church overlooking the river and the fields are known as Manor Yards.

The Parish Council adopted Ælfric for Loddon's town sign in 1961 and the bronze statue still stands on Farthing Green.

=== Modern times ===
Although Loddon and Chedgrave have been flooded many times through history, the worst or at least the best documented occasions were in August 1912 and September 1968.

At about midnight on 27 August 1912 a portion of the roadway was washed away and soon afterwards part of the bridge caved in. The footbridge across the river between the two industrial sites disappeared downstream. The mill was in great jeopardy and forty men worked hard to preserve as much of the road as possible. The piling and the banks of the Chet were washed away and some of the wherries broke their moorings.

On 12 September 1968 a great storm followed a very wet summer, so when the heavy rain came that night the ground was too waterlogged to let the rain drain away. According to the Eastern Daily Press it had been Norfolk's wettest ever September day. The torrential rain was accompanied by thunder and lightning and many roads were many inches deep in water.

== Governance ==
The first tier of local government is Loddon Parish Council. The parish is within the areas of South Norfolk District Council and the Broads Authority.

== Landmarks ==
Loddon has many fine buildings; from the 15th-century parish church of Holy Trinity, through the 18th-century "Loddon House" (originally a mental institution), to "Farthing Green House", which is a good example of Georgian architecture.

=== Holy Trinity Church ===
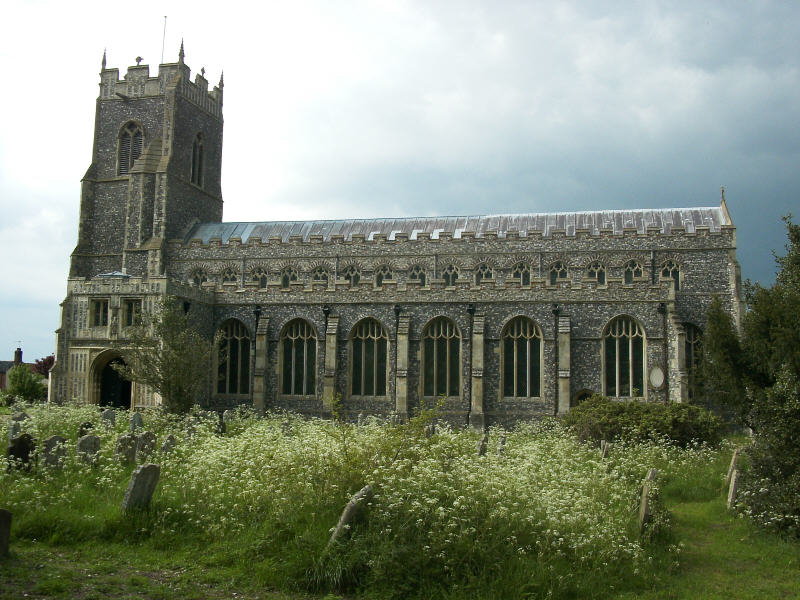
Loddon Holy Trinity

The town centre of Loddon, a designated conservation area, is dominated by the Holy Trinity Church dates from 1490 by Sir James Hobart who lived at Hales Hall, and was Attorney General to King Henry VII. The outside of the building is faced with flintwork and the interior contains a hammerbeam roof, Jacobean pulpit, early Edwardian pews with carved poppy-head ends, several table-top tombs, an ancient poor-box and a panel on the painted rood screen which shows William of Norwich, a boy martyr who was falsely claimed to have been crucified by Jews in the 12th century in one of the first blood libels. There is also a medieval baptismal font set high on three steps, however despite its shaft and bowl were originally carved and painted, they were defaced during periods of iconoclasm.

The church is said to have possibly replaced an earlier Norman church and an even older one built by St Felix, Bishop of the East Angles, about 630.

=== Watermill ===
There was a mill mentioned at Loddon in the Domesday Book of 1086, and a watermill at Chedgrave in the early 1330s, but there is no evidence for the sites of these mills. The present mill, Loddon watermill near the town centre which is no longer functioning, was built in the 18th century with the river diverted to run underneath it. Loddon watermill was sometimes known as Chedgrave mill and is one of the earliest recorded buildings in the town. It was built of weatherboard with a pantiled roof, and was situated quite close to the centre of the town. The mill pool was never very big, but was apparently a widened and deepened Y-shaped section of river up stream of the mill. This produced adequate power for the miller to meet the needs of the local farmers and villagers. The mill still retains 19th-century milling equipment.

When the mill was built it was found that the best position for it involved diverting the river Chet to the south of its natural course. This involved considerable effort and expense and in times of severe flood the river attempts to revert to its original channel.

=== Old Town Hall ===
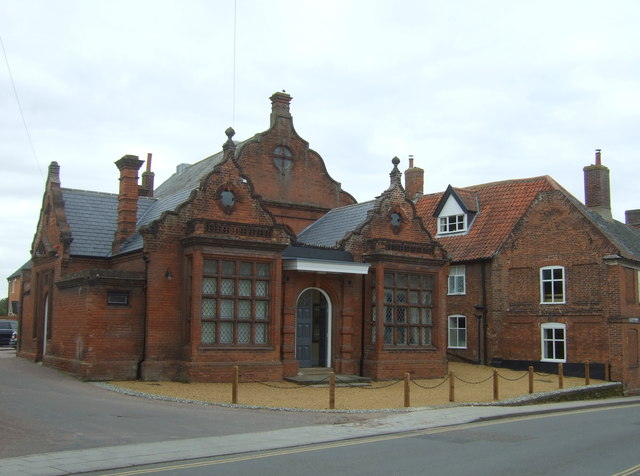
Old Town Hall, Loddon

The Old Town Hall was commissioned by a private company and the petty session hearings were held in there for the first time on 10 August 1870.

== Education ==
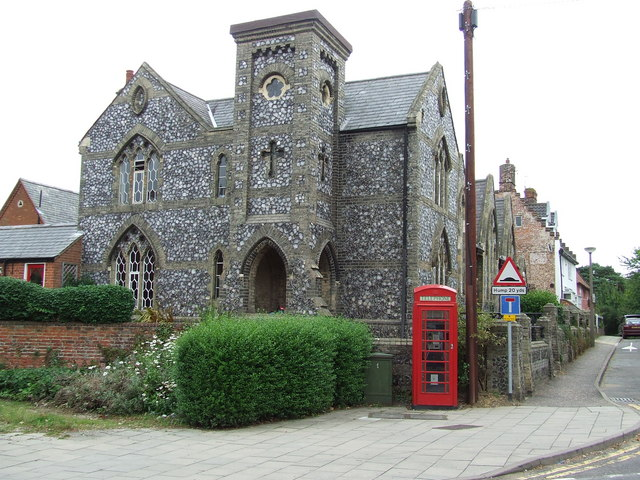
Loddon library - geograph.org.uk

Loddon is home to three state schools: Loddon Infant and Nursery, Loddon Junior and Hobart High School, one of the few schools in the country to have a 'classroom of the future'. There is also Loddon nursery school education. An independent school Langley School, lies just to the North of Loddon at Langley Park.

The first records about schooling in Loddon mention the school in what is now called the Priest's room in the Holy Trinity Church in 1781. The 19th century saw considerable changes, including a rise in the population and consequently in the number of children. It also saw a rise in the popularity of nonconformist religions and a certain amount of competition in the provision of education for the young.

As well as the established schools there were several private schools in the town at one time or another. The 1851/61/71 census figures show a private school on the east side of Bridge Street.

By 1856 it was decided to build a new school in Loddon for 180 pupils on the site of the old guildhall on Church Plain. Two-thirds of the cost was to come from the Town Estates, which was revenue derived from the renting of Town Farm and other town lands. The rest came from public subscription and an appeal was set up to raise money from the community. The eventual result was a flint faced Gothic Revival building which is still used today as the Loddon Branch Library.

The school term started in 1858 (although the building does not appear to have been finished until 1859), when 99 children from 3–13 years old were entered. Many would not stay at school long, nor attend regularly as the need to supplement the family income when possible could not be ignored. Many children had a long walk to school, which could be impossible in bad weather. This building was used as a school until 1969.

== Industry ==
Previous industries included egg packing and corn grinding. Loddon also had a gas and brick works.

Nowadays the north of the town has many boatyards situated on the River Chet. These provide yachtsmen and hire boat crews during the season and together with the boatbuilding and letting yards, make an important contribution to the economy of the town.

Loddon also has a small industrial area situated at the south of the town. Engineering and other industries sited on this industrial estate provide employment for local people. However, Express Plastics, one of the major employers has recently moved to Beccles. The site is to become a small housing estate. A famous East Anglian company Anglian Bus started in Loddon in 1986 before expansion resulted in moving to Beccles.

The Loddon and District Business Association, which was formed in 2011, represents all businesses in the area both micro and multimillion-pound industry. They work together to enhance the community life and ensure that growth increases and the facilities needed in a community of this size are met.

== Tourism ==
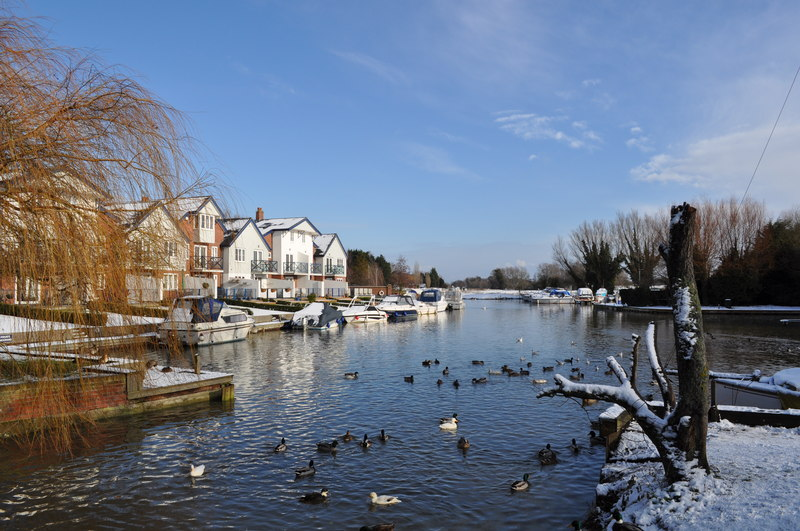
The River Chet

Today the River Chet is one of the focal points for boating tourism within the southern Broads area and is the only such centre within South Norfolk District.

Further downriver still can be found Hardley Flood, a good spot for bird watching.

== Village of the Year ==
In 2005, Loddon was chosen to represent Norfolk in the National Calor Village of the Year Competition. In December 2005 representatives from Loddon, including local business woman Caroline Dwen and Lady Kate Hartland, went to London to the National Presentation Ceremony where the town had won the first prize for the East Region.

== Media ==
Local news and television programmes are provided by BBC East and ITV Anglia. Television signals are received from the Tacolneston TV transmitter. Local radio stations are BBC Radio Norfolk, Heart East, Kiss, and Greatest Hits Radio East (formerly Radio Norwich 99.9). The town is served by the local newspaper, Beccles & Bungay Journal including the regional newspaper, Eastern Daily Press.

== Transport ==
The A146 bypasses Loddon heading north-east to Norwich and south-east to Beccles and Lowestoft. The route east to Great Yarmouth lies along the B1136 and A143. Both First Norfolk & Suffolk and Konectbus provide bus services to Norwich and Lowestoft via Beccles. Ambassador Travel runs services to Thurlton, Seething, Norwich and Great Yarmouth.

The Broads system of waterways is connected to the River Chet and mooring is available to the east of the town.

== Nearest places ==
- Chedgrave – 1/2 mile (0.80 km) north
- Hales – 1 1/4 miles (2.0 km) south-east
- Thurton – 2 1/2 miles (4.0 km) north-west
- Mundham – 2 4/5 miles (4.5 km) west
- Thurlton – 3 1/2 miles (5.6 km) east
- Seething – 3 miles (4.8 km) west

== Sport ==
A wide variety of sport is on offer in Loddon and the close surrounding area. The Hobart High School gym is used for many groups as is the Loddon and Chedgrave Jubilee Hall and other halls in the community.

There is a local football team called Loddon United. The team plays at The Playing Field, Jubilee Hall (locally referred to as 'The Jub'), Georges Lane, Loddon. There is also a youth football club, Loddon Grasshoppers, with teams for under 8s up to under 16s, including an under 13s girls team.

Loddon Ladies Hockey, Loddon Squash Club, White Dolphins Swimming for children, Loddon and Hales Cricket Club, Loddon Bowls Club, Loddon Community Gym, Short tennis, Short Mat Bowls, Badminton, Tumble Tots, Excelsior Keep Fit for over 50s, Tennis Club, Tennis Coaching, Junior Gymnastics, Junior Karate, Fencing, Volleyball, Pilates, Aerobics, Junior Trampoline, Medau Keep Fit, Indoor Bowls, Funky Feet Ballet, Yoga, Running Club, Darts and Walking with the Loddon and Chedgrave District Society.

== Notable people ==
- Rodwell House in Loddon was for many years the residence of the Buxton baronets.
- Adam Drury and Paul Haylock - Footballers for Norwich City Football Club used to reside in Loddon.
- Davy Jones from the Monkees lived there briefly as a boy.
