= Grade I listed buildings in West Lindsey =

There are over 9,000 Grade I listed buildings in England. This page is a list of these buildings in the district of West Lindsey in Lincolnshire.

== West Lindsey ==
Name	Location	Type	Completed (Note: The date given is the date used by Historic England as significant for the initial building or that of an important part in the structure's description.)	Date designated	Grid ref. (Note: The grid reference is based on the British national grid reference system, sometimes known as OSGB36, used by the Ordnance Survey.) Geo-coordinates	Entry number (Note: The "List Entry Number" is a unique number assigned to each listed building and scheduled monument by Historic England.)	Image
Church of St Lawrence	Bardney	Parish Church	c1434-End 15th century	30 November 1966	TF1193969367; 53°12′35″N 0°19′31″W	1359500	Church of St Lawrence More images
Fragment of Barlings Abbey Church	Barlings	Abbey	Early 14th century	30 November 1966	TF0896073544; 53°14′52″N 0°22′07″W	1064017	Fragment of Barlings Abbey Church More images
Church of All Saints	Bigby	Parish Church	12th century	1 November 1966	TA0597807472; 53°33′11″N 0°24′06″W	1063405	Church of All Saints More images
Norton Place	Bishop Norton	Country House	1776	25 October 1951	SK9720790891; 53°24′21″N 0°32′21″W	1359423	Norton Place More images
Church of St Alkmund	Blyborough	Parish Church	Early 13th century	16 December 1964	SK9339794556; 53°26′22″N 0°35′44″W	1063375	Church of St Alkmund More images
Church of St Martin	Blyton	Parish Church	11th century	16 December 1964	SK8532494798; 53°26′35″N 0°43′01″W	1064159	Church of St Martin More images
Church of All Saints	Brocklesby Park, Brocklesby	Church	14th century	1 November 1966	TA1397111315; 53°35′10″N 0°16′47″W	1165503	Church of All Saints More images
Brocklesby Hall	Brocklesby Park, Brocklesby	Country House	16th century	25 October 1951	TA1373011356; 53°35′11″N 0°17′00″W	1359800	Brocklesby Hall More images
Holgate Monument	Brocklesby Park, Brocklesby	Commemorative Monument	1785	1 November 1966	TA1394111160; 53°35′05″N 0°16′49″W	1063417	Holgate Monument More images
Hunt Kennels and House	Brocklesby Park, Brocklesby	House	1810	1 November 1966	TA1406411108; 53°35′03″N 0°16′42″W	1166049	Upload Photo
Newsham Bridge	Brocklesby Park, Brocklesby	Bridge	c. 1772	1 November 1966	TA1318913451; 53°36′19″N 0°17′27″W	1063419	Newsham Bridge More images
The Hermitage	Brocklesby Park, Brocklesby	Root House	Late 18th century	24 January 1985	TA1377310548; 53°34′45″N 0°16′59″W	1063418	The Hermitage More images
Mausoleum, Wall and Screen	Brocklesby Park, Great Limber	Wall	1792	25 October 1951	TA1332808901; 53°33′52″N 0°17′25″W	1063361	Mausoleum, Wall and Screen More images
Church of Saint Peter and Saint Paul	Caistor	Church	1835	1 November 1966	TA1167701274; 53°29′47″N 0°19′05″W	1063382	Church of Saint Peter and Saint Paul More images
Roman Wall	Caistor	Wall	C4	1 November 1966	TA1165601223; 53°29′45″N 0°19′06″W	1063421	Upload Photo
Church of St Peter and St Paul	Cherry Willingham	Parish Church	1753	30 November 1966	TF0318372410; 53°14′19″N 0°27′19″W	1064018	Church of St Peter and St Paul More images
Church of St Mary	Claxby	Parish Church	13th century	1 November 1966	TF1112494583; 53°26′11″N 0°19′43″W	1359789	Church of St Mary More images
Church of St Lawrence	Corringham	Parish Church	11th century	15 December 1954	SK8714791657; 53°24′52″N 0°41′25″W	1064162	Church of St Lawrence More images
Church of St Chad	Dunholme	Parish Church	Early 13th century	30 November 1966	TF0247679420; 53°18′07″N 0°27′49″W	1064139	Church of St Chad More images
Fillingham Castle	Fillingham	Country House	18th century	25 October 1951	SK9566186026; 53°21′45″N 0°33′50″W	1166045	Fillingham Castle More images
Church of St Clement	Fiskerton	Parish Church	11th century	30 November 1966	TF0482571986; 53°14′04″N 0°25′51″W	1064020	Church of St Clement More images
Parish Church of All Saints	Gainsborough	Parish Church	14th century	14 April 1964	SK8144990110; 53°24′06″N 0°46′35″W	1147378	Parish Church of All Saints More images
The Old Hall	Gainsborough	Hall House	1471-1484	4 April 1964	SK8132090012; 53°24′02″N 0°46′42″W	1359773	The Old Hall More images
Church of St Peter and St Paul	Glentham	Parish Church	13th century	1 November 1966	TF0031090462; 53°24′05″N 0°29′34″W	1165045	Church of St Peter and St Paul More images
Grange de Lings House	Grange de Lings	Farmhouse	19th century	30 November 1966	SK9869977283; 53°17′00″N 0°31′16″W	1359448	Grange de Lings House More images
Church of Saint Peter	Great Limber	Parish Church	12th century	1 November 1966	TA1350108628; 53°33′43″N 0°17′16″W	1359817	Church of Saint Peter More images
2 Grave Slabs Under Eaves on South Side of Nave at Church of St Michael	Hackthorn	Gravestones	10th century	21 June 1985	SK9911782346; 53°19′44″N 0°30′48″W	1064145	Upload Photo
Grave Marker at Church of St Michael 14 Paces from South East Angle of Nave	Hackthorn	Gravestone	10th century	21 June 1985	SK9911182344; 53°19′43″N 0°30′48″W	1165706	Upload Photo
Hackthorn Hall	Hackthorn	Country House	Shown in drawing of 1795	30 November 1966	SK9905482361; 53°19′44″N 0°30′51″W	1064144	Hackthorn Hall More images
Church of St Chad	Harpswell	Parish Church	Late 11th century	16 December 1964	SK9358789959; 53°23′53″N 0°35′38″W	1309029	Church of St Chad More images
Church of All Saints	Heapham	Parish Church	Mid 11th century	16 December 1964	SK8779988513; 53°23′10″N 0°40′53″W	1064048	Church of All Saints More images
Church of All Saints	Holton cum Beckering	Parish Church	13th century	30 November 1966	TF1163081285; 53°19′00″N 0°19′33″W	1064035	Church of All Saints More images
Church of Saint Bartholomew	Keelby	Church	13th century	1 November 1966	TA1650309949; 53°34′24″N 0°14′31″W	1063367	Church of Saint Bartholomew More images
No 9 Shop and Church End Farmhouse	Keelby	House	c. 1200	4 October 1972	TA1662909977; 53°34′24″N 0°14′25″W	1359820	No 9 Shop and Church End Farmhouse More images
Church of All Saints	Laughton	Parish Church	12th century	16 December 1964	SK8491197300; 53°27′56″N 0°43′21″W	1317208	Church of All Saints More images
Church of St Helen	Lea	Parish Church	13th century	16 December 1964	SK8308286678; 53°22′14″N 0°45′10″W	1146567	Church of St Helen More images
Church of St Cornelius	Linwood	Parish Church	Late 12th century	1 November 1966	TF1140585687; 53°21′23″N 0°19′39″W	1166212	Church of St Cornelius More images
Church of St Margaret of Antioch	Marton	Church	Anglo Saxon	16 December 1964	SK8397081759; 53°19′34″N 0°44′27″W	1359484	Church of St Margaret of Antioch More images
Church of All Saints	Nettleham	Parish Church	Early 12th century	30 November 1966	TF0077175323; 53°15′55″N 0°29′26″W	1064111	Church of All Saints More images
Gates and Piers to Nettleham Hall	Nettleham	Gate	c. 1720	31 January 1952	SK9934575916; 53°16′15″N 0°30′42″W	1165868	Gates and Piers to Nettleham Hall More images
Church of St Peter	Normanby by Spital	Parish Church	12th century	30 November 1966	TF0011388110; 53°22′49″N 0°29′47″W	1064189	Church of St Peter More images
North Carlton Hall	North Carlton	Country House	Late 16th century	31 January 1952	SK9429277686; 53°17′16″N 0°35′13″W	1147235	North Carlton Hall More images
Church of St John the Baptist	Northorpe	Parish Church	12th century	16 December 1964	SK8946997157; 53°27′49″N 0°39′14″W	1165812	Church of St John the Baptist More images
Church of St. Peter	Kingerby, Osgodby	Parish Church	11th century	1 November 1966	TF0573392855; 53°25′19″N 0°24′37″W	1063432	Church of St. Peter More images
Church of St Peter and St Paul	Owmby-by-Spital	Parish Church	12th century	30 November 1966	TF0001887349; 53°22′25″N 0°29′53″W	1165122	Church of St Peter and St Paul More images
Church of St Mary Magdalene	Rothwell	Parish Church	Late 11th century	1 November 1966	TF1495799356; 53°28′42″N 0°16′09″W	1165336	Church of St Mary Magdalene More images
Church of St Helen	Saxby	Parish Church	1775	30 November 1966	TF0045286127; 53°21′45″N 0°29′31″W	1064193	Church of St Helen More images
Church of St Botolph	Saxilby, Saxilby with Ingleby	Parish Church	12th century	30 November 1966	SK8951476151; 53°16′29″N 0°39′33″W	1359490	Church of St Botolph More images
Gateway at Scampton House Farm in Field to West of House	Scampton	Gate	Early 17th century	31 January 1952	SK9449879481; 53°18′14″N 0°35′00″W	1147274	Upload Photo
Church of St Peter	Scotter	Parish Church	12th century	16 December 1964	SE8875400823; 53°29′48″N 0°39′49″W	1064133	Church of St Peter More images
Church of St Genwys	Scotton	Parish Church	12th century	16 December 1964	SK8903899099; 53°28′52″N 0°39′35″W	1165912	Church of St Genwys More images
Church of St Laurence	Snarford	Parish Church	12th century	30 November 1966	TF0506382432; 53°19′42″N 0°25′26″W	1165955	Church of St Laurence More images
Church of St John the Baptist and Monson Mausoleum	South Carlton	Church	18th century	30 November 1966	SK9508476671; 53°16′43″N 0°34′32″W	1359493	Church of St John the Baptist and Monson Mausoleum More images
Church of St Lawrence and St George	Springthorpe	Parish Church	11th century	16 December 1964	SK8756689756; 53°23′51″N 0°41′04″W	1146616	Church of St Lawrence and St George More images
Church of St Edith	Stow	Church	Mid 12th century	16 December 1964	SK9080683096; 53°20′13″N 0°38′16″W	1146742	Church of St Edith More images
Church of St Mary	Stow	Parish Church	1034-1049	16 December 1964	SK8819081999; 53°19′39″N 0°40′38″W	1146624	Church of St Mary More images
Church of All Saints	Tealby	Parish Church	12th century	1 November 1966	TF1571290896; 53°24′08″N 0°15′40″W	1063475	Church of All Saints More images
Torksey Castle	Torksey	Country House	1560	16 December 1964	SK8361478781; 53°17′58″N 0°44′49″W	1064079	Torksey Castle More images
Church of All Saints	Walesby	Church	c. 1175	1 November 1966	TF1382492396; 53°24′58″N 0°17′20″W	1063484	Church of All Saints More images
Church of All Saints	West Rasen	Parish Church	11th century	1 November 1966	TF0649589304; 53°23′23″N 0°24′00″W	1063400	Church of All Saints More images
