= Grade I listed buildings in Lincolnshire =

Lincolnshire shown within England

The county of Lincolnshire is divided into nine districts. The districts of Lincolnshire are Lincoln, North Kesteven, South Kesteven, South Holland, Boston, East Lindsey, West Lindsey, North Lincolnshire, and North East Lincolnshire.

As there are 440 Grade I listed buildings in the county they have been split into separate lists for each district.

- Grade I listed buildings in Lincoln
- Grade I listed buildings in North Kesteven
- Grade I listed buildings in South Kesteven
- Grade I listed buildings in South Holland
- Grade I listed buildings in Boston (borough)
- Grade I listed buildings in East Lindsey
- Grade I listed buildings in West Lindsey
- Grade I listed buildings in North Lincolnshire
- Grade I listed buildings in North East Lincolnshire

== See also ==
- Grade II* listed buildings in Lincolnshire
