= Listed buildings in Stamford, Lincolnshire =

Non-Civil Parish in Lincolnshire, England

Stamford is a town and civil parish in the county of Lincolnshire, England. It contains 447 listed buildings that are recorded in the National Heritage List for England. Of these eight are grade I, 103 are grade II* and 336 are grade II.

This list is based on the information retrieved online from Historic England.

== Key ==
Grade	Criteria
I	Buildings that are of exceptional interest
II*	Particularly important buildings of more than special interest
II	Buildings that are of special interest

== Listing ==
Name	Grade	Location	Type	Completed (Note: The date given is the date used by Historic England as significant for the initial building or that of an important part in the structure's description.)	Grid ref. (Note: The grid reference is based on the British national grid reference system, sometimes known as OSGB36, used by the Ordnance Survey.) Geo-coordinates	Notes	Entry number (Note: The "List Entry Number" is a unique number assigned to each listed building and scheduled monument by Historic England.)	Image	Ref.	Wikidata
Albert Bridge	II	Albert Road			TF0334306930; 52°39′01″N 0°28′26″W		1359564	Albert Bridge More images	Q26641791	
1, All Saints' Place	II*	1, All Saints' Place			TF0285007200; 52°39′10″N 0°28′52″W		1062302	1, All Saints' Place More images	Q17549670	
2, All Saints' Place	II*	2, All Saints' Place			TF0285607196; 52°39′10″N 0°28′51″W		1062303	2, All Saints' Place More images	Q17549684	
3, All Saints' Place	II*	3, All Saints' Place			TF0286307191; 52°39′10″N 0°28′51″W		1360360	3, All Saints' Place More images	Q17550471	
4 and 5, All Saints Place	II*	4 and 5, All Saints Place			TF0286807181; 52°39′09″N 0°28′51″W		1062304	4 and 5, All Saints Place	Q544894	
The Crown Hotel	II	6, All Saints' Place			TF0288407167; 52°39′09″N 0°28′50″W		1360361	The Crown Hotel	Q544894	
The Marsh Harrier Public House	II	7, All Saints' Place			TF0289007153; 52°39′08″N 0°28′50″W		1062305	The Marsh Harrier Public House	Q544894	
8, All Saints' Place	II	8, All Saints' Place			TF0289507150; 52°39′08″N 0°28′49″W		1360362	8, All Saints' Place	Q544894	
11, All Saints' Place	II	11, All Saints' Place			TF0284107110; 52°39′07″N 0°28′52″W		1062306	11, All Saints' Place More images	Q26315683	
12, All Saints' Place	II	12, All Saints' Place			TF0282407129; 52°39′08″N 0°28′53″W		1062307	12, All Saints' Place	Q544894	
14 and 15, All Saints' Place	II	14 and 15, All Saints' Place			TF0280907163; 52°39′09″N 0°28′54″W		1062308	14 and 15, All Saints' Place More images	Q26315685	
16, All Saints Place	II	16, All Saints Place			TF0281707170; 52°39′09″N 0°28′54″W		1062309	16, All Saints Place More images	Q26315686	
Church of All Saints	I	All Saints' Place (centre)			TF0285207154; 52°39′09″N 0°28′52″W		1062310	Church of All Saints More images	Q4729351	
3, All Saints Street	II	3, All Saints Street			TF0281607097; 52°39′07″N 0°28′54″W		1360380	Upload Photo	Q544894	
14, All Saints Street	II	14, All Saints Street			TF0274807084; 52°39′06″N 0°28′57″W		1360381	14, All Saints Street More images	Q544894	
St Peter's Callis Almshouses	II	All Saints' Street			TF0275807066; 52°39′06″N 0°28′57″W		1062270	St Peter's Callis Almshouses More images	Q544894	
Melbourn Brothers Brewery	II	All Saints' Street			TF0280007110; 52°39′07″N 0°28′55″W		1062273	Upload Photo	Q544894	
Gateway to Sir Malcolm Sargent School	II	All Saints' Street			TF0276407085; 52°39′06″N 0°28′56″W		1360382	Upload Photo	Q544894	
Millstone Inn	II	1, All Saints' Street			TF0283007105; 52°39′07″N 0°28′53″W		1062268	Millstone Inn More images	Q26315658	
4-8, All Saints' Street	II	4-8, All Saints' Street			TF0279907086; 52°39′06″N 0°28′55″W		1062269	Upload Photo	Q544894	
15, All Saints' Street	II	15, All Saints' Street			TF0275507088; 52°39′06″N 0°28′57″W		1062271	Upload Photo	Q544894	
16 and 17, All Saints' Street	II	16 and 17, All Saints' Street			TF0276607091; 52°39′07″N 0°28′56″W		1062272	Upload Photo	Q544894	
Albion Tavern	II	20, All Saints' Street			TF0279507106; 52°39′07″N 0°28′55″W		1360383	Upload Photo	Q544894	
21, All Saints' Street	II	21, All Saints' Street			TF0281407118; 52°39′07″N 0°28′54″W		1062274	21, All Saints' Street More images	Q26315664	
22, All Saints' Street	II	22, All Saints' Street			TF0282207122; 52°39′08″N 0°28′53″W		1360384	22, All Saints' Street More images	Q26642495	
4, Austin Street	II*	4, Austin Street			TF0269406973; 52°39′03″N 0°29′00″W		1365616	4, Austin Street More images	Q17550551	
5, Austin Street	II	5, Austin Street			TF0268206968; 52°39′03″N 0°29′01″W		1062275	5, Austin Street More images	Q26315665	
11, Austin Street	II	11, Austin Street			TF0266106954; 52°39′02″N 0°29′02″W		1360385	11, Austin Street More images	Q544894	
Austin Friars	II	12, Austin Street			TF0260106924; 52°39′01″N 0°29′05″W		1308575	Upload Photo	Q544894	
14, Austin Street	II	14, Austin Street			TF0256006911; 52°39′01″N 0°29′08″W		1062276	14, Austin Street More images	Q544894	
Summerhouse Against the Garden Wall of Stukeley House	II	9 Barn Hill			TF0275107281; 52°39′13″N 0°28′57″W		1412673	Upload Photo	Q544894	
Gateway at Stukeley House	II	9 Barn Hill, PE9 2YN			TF0277307294; 52°39′13″N 0°28′56″W		1447156	Upload Photo	Q544894	
Gazebo in Garden of Barn Hill House	II*	Barn Hill			TF0276007231; 52°39′11″N 0°28′57″W		1062279	Gazebo in Garden of Barn Hill House	Q544894	
Wall and Gatepiers to Barn Hill House	II*	Barn Hill			TF0277507219; 52°39′11″N 0°28′56″W		1147390	Wall and Gatepiers to Barn Hill House More images	Q17549884	
Sunday School	II*	Barn Hill			TF0280007270; 52°39′12″N 0°28′54″W		1308533	Upload Photo	Q544894	
Barn Hill House	II*	Barn Hill			TF0275707203; 52°39′10″N 0°28′57″W		1360348	Barn Hill House More images	Q17550450	
2, Barn Hill	II	2, Barn Hill			TF0280407184; 52°39′10″N 0°28′54″W		1147358	2, Barn Hill	Q544894	
3, Barn Hill	II*	3, Barn Hill			TF0281507190; 52°39′10″N 0°28′54″W		1062277	3, Barn Hill More images	Q17549622	
4, Barn Hill	II*	4, Barn Hill			TF0279707194; 52°39′10″N 0°28′55″W		1360347	4, Barn Hill More images	Q17550446	
5, Barn Hill	II*	5, Barn Hill			TF0279207197; 52°39′10″N 0°28′55″W		1147366	5, Barn Hill More images	Q17549878	
6, Barn Hill	II*	6, Barn Hill			TF0278207200; 52°39′10″N 0°28′55″W		1062278	6, Barn Hill More images	Q17549625	
Stukeley House	II*	9, Barn Hill			TF0277307259; 52°39′12″N 0°28′56″W		1147402	Stukeley House More images	Q17549890	
9a, Barn Hill	II*	9a, Barn Hill			TF0275607254; 52°39′12″N 0°28′57″W		1360349	9a, Barn Hill	Q544894	
10, Barn Hill	II*	10, Barn Hill			TF0277607251; 52°39′12″N 0°28′56″W		1062280	10, Barn Hill More images	Q17549634	
12, Barn Hill	II*	12, Barn Hill			TF0278907234; 52°39′11″N 0°28′55″W		1062281	12, Barn Hill	Q544894	
13, Barn Hill	II*	13, Barn Hill			TF0280007223; 52°39′11″N 0°28′54″W		1360350	13, Barn Hill More images	Q17550459	
14, Barn Hill	II*	14, Barn Hill			TF0281207215; 52°39′11″N 0°28′54″W		1147446	14, Barn Hill More images	Q17549896	
15, Barn Hill	II*	15, Barn Hill			TF0282607213; 52°39′10″N 0°28′53″W		1062282	15, Barn Hill	Q544894	
16, Barn Hill	II*	16, Barn Hill			TF0283507209; 52°39′10″N 0°28′53″W		1360351	16, Barn Hill More images	Q17550467	
17, Barn Hill	II*	17, Barn Hill			TF0284307203; 52°39′10″N 0°28′52″W		1147459	17, Barn Hill More images	Q17549901	
Postern Gate of Castle. Section of Castle Wall	II	Bath Row			TF0276806957; 52°39′02″N 0°28′56″W		1062284	Upload Photo	Q544894	
Outhouses at Corner of Castle Dyke	II	Bath Row			TF0284806980; 52°39′03″N 0°28′52″W		1308487	Outhouses at Corner of Castle Dyke More images	Q26595086	
7, Bath Row	II	7, Bath Row			TF0272406931; 52°39′01″N 0°28′59″W		1062283	Upload Photo	Q544894	
8-10, Bath Row	II	8-10, Bath Row			TF0273506954; 52°39′02″N 0°28′58″W		1147478	Upload Photo	Q544894	
Bath House	II	16, Bath Row			TF0280606968; 52°39′03″N 0°28′54″W		1062285	Bath House More images	Q26315669	
23, Bath Row	II	23, Bath Row			TF0295106982; 52°39′03″N 0°28′47″W		1062286	Upload Photo	Q544894	
24, Bath Row	II	24, Bath Row			TF0295506983; 52°39′03″N 0°28′46″W		1308492	Upload Photo	Q544894	
Number 4 (Bownes Hospital) Chapel and Hall. All Other Buildings at Browne's Hospital	II*	Broad Street			TF0295707286; 52°39′13″N 0°28′46″W		1062247	Number 4 (Bownes Hospital) Chapel and Hall. All Other Buildings at Browne's Hospital More images	Q4976462	
Warden's House to Browne's Hospital	II	Broad Street			TF0298207274; 52°39′12″N 0°28′45″W		1062248	Warden's House to Browne's Hospital More images	Q96239088	
School of Roman Catholic Church of St Augustine	II	Broad Street			TF0306307304; 52°39′13″N 0°28′40″W		1062251	School of Roman Catholic Church of St Augustine	Q544894	
Wall and Gate Piers to Roman Catholic Church of St Augustine	II	Broad Street			TF0307007296; 52°39′13″N 0°28′40″W		1062252	Upload Photo	Q544894	
Premises Occupied by Barclays Bank (left Hand Section)	II	Broad Street			TF0296307199; 52°39′10″N 0°28′46″W		1062259	Premises Occupied by Barclays Bank (left Hand Section)	Q544894	
Railings and Terrace to No 1	II*	Broad Street			TF0292207199; 52°39′10″N 0°28′48″W		1062288	Railings and Terrace to No 1	Q544894	
Wall and Gates to No 2	II*	Broad Street			TF0294107217; 52°39′11″N 0°28′47″W		1062289	Wall and Gates to No 2	Q544894	
Old Technical School	II	Broad Street			TF0308207272; 52°39′12″N 0°28′39″W		1147642	Old Technical School More images	Q26440653	
K6 Telephone Kiosk Outside Number 1 Broad Street	II	Broad Street			TF0292907204; 52°39′10″N 0°28′48″W		1360035	K6 Telephone Kiosk Outside Number 1 Broad Street More images	Q26642197	
Roman Catholic Church of St Augustine	II	Broad Street			TF0308407314; 52°39′14″N 0°28′39″W		1360372	Roman Catholic Church of St Augustine More images	Q5117563	
1, Broad Street	II*	1, Broad Street			TF0290707205; 52°39′10″N 0°28′49″W		1062287	1, Broad Street More images	Q17549647	
2, Broad Street	II	2, Broad Street			TF0292507222; 52°39′11″N 0°28′48″W		1308498	2, Broad Street	Q544894	
3, Broad Street	II	3, Broad Street			TF0293307233; 52°39′11″N 0°28′47″W		1360369	3, Broad Street More images	Q26642483	
5-8, Broad Street	II	5-8, Broad Street			TF0299707285; 52°39′13″N 0°28′44″W		1360370	5-8, Broad Street More images	Q26642484	
9, Broad Street	II	9, Broad Street			TF0301707287; 52°39′13″N 0°28′43″W		1062249	9, Broad Street More images	Q26315642	
10, Broad Street	II	10, Broad Street			TF0303107293; 52°39′13″N 0°28′42″W		1360371	10, Broad Street	Q544894	
11, Broad Street	II	11, Broad Street			TF0304107298; 52°39′13″N 0°28′42″W		1062250	11, Broad Street More images	Q26315643	
Stag and Pheasant Public House	II	14, Broad Street			TF0309807311; 52°39′13″N 0°28′38″W		1360373	Stag and Pheasant Public House More images	Q26642487	
15, Broad Street	II	15, Broad Street			TF0311407313; 52°39′14″N 0°28′38″W		1062253	15, Broad Street More images	Q26315646	
Rising Sun Public House	II	17, Broad Street			TF0313507321; 52°39′14″N 0°28′36″W		1308461	Rising Sun Public House More images	Q26595062	
18, Broad Street	II*	18, Broad Street			TF0314507320; 52°39′14″N 0°28′36″W		1360374	18, Broad Street More images	Q17550483	
19, Broad Street	II*	19, Broad Street			TF0315007325; 52°39′14″N 0°28′36″W		1062254	19, Broad Street More images	Q17549609	
20 and 21, Broad Street	II*	20 and 21, Broad Street			TF0315907323; 52°39′14″N 0°28′35″W		1308463	20 and 21, Broad Street More images	Q17550237	
22, Broad Street	II	22, Broad Street			TF0316907324; 52°39′14″N 0°28′35″W		1062255	22, Broad Street	Q544894	
25, Broad Street	II*	25, Broad Street			TF0314207298; 52°39′13″N 0°28′36″W		1360375	25, Broad Street More images	Q17550488	
31, Broad Street	II	31, Broad Street			TF0311407282; 52°39′13″N 0°28′38″W		1308428	31, Broad Street More images	Q26595033	
32, Broad Street	II	32, Broad Street			TF0309407272; 52°39′12″N 0°28′39″W		1062256	32, Broad Street More images	Q26315648	
33, Broad Street	II	33, Broad Street			TF0306907261; 52°39′12″N 0°28′40″W		1360376	33, Broad Street More images	Q26642488	
34, Broad Street	II*	34, Broad Street			TF0305407259; 52°39′12″N 0°28′41″W		1062257	34, Broad Street More images	Q17549615	
37, Broad Street	II	37, Broad Street			TF0302407256; 52°39′12″N 0°28′42″W		1360377	37, Broad Street	Q544894	
38, Broad Street	II	38, Broad Street			TF0300407248; 52°39′11″N 0°28′44″W		1062258	38, Broad Street	Q544894	
39 and 40, Broad Street	II	39 and 40, Broad Street			TF0298507227; 52°39′11″N 0°28′45″W		1308413	39 and 40, Broad Street	Q544894	
50 and 51, Broad Street	II	50 and 51, Broad Street			TF0294607183; 52°39′09″N 0°28′47″W		1147695	50 and 51, Broad Street More images	Q26440699	
52, Broad Street	II*	52, Broad Street			TF0292707185; 52°39′09″N 0°28′48″W		1360378	52, Broad Street More images	Q17550493	
1 and 2, Burghley Lane	II*	1 and 2, Burghley Lane			TF0321006586; 52°38′50″N 0°28′33″W		1062260	1 and 2, Burghley Lane More images	Q17549620	
7-13, Burghley Lane	II	7-13, Burghley Lane			TF0325406590; 52°38′50″N 0°28′31″W		1308401	Upload Photo	Q544894	
Clock House	II	Casterton Road			TF0244907260; 52°39′12″N 0°29′13″W		1360379	Upload Photo	Q544894	
1 and 2, Castle Street	II	1 and 2, Castle Street			TF0291407024; 52°39′04″N 0°28′49″W		1062261	Upload Photo	Q544894	
Premises Occupied by the Central Press	II	3, Castle Street			TF0290407022; 52°39′04″N 0°28′49″W		1147738	Upload Photo	Q544894	
5, Castle Street	II	5, Castle Street			TF0287707026; 52°39′04″N 0°28′51″W		1062262	Upload Photo	Q544894	
1, Cheyne Lane	II	1, Cheyne Lane			TF0305207139; 52°39′08″N 0°28′41″W		1147751	1, Cheyne Lane More images	Q26440748	
2, 3 and 3a, Cheyne Lane	II	2, 3 and 3a, Cheyne Lane			TF0305507134; 52°39′08″N 0°28′41″W		1062263	2, 3 and 3a, Cheyne Lane More images	Q26315653	
3 and 4, Crown Street	II	3 and 4, Crown Street			TF0292107179; 52°39′09″N 0°28′48″W		1360393	Upload Photo	Q544894	
6 and 7, Crown Street	II	6 and 7, Crown Street			TF0289907162; 52°39′09″N 0°28′49″W		1308370	Upload Photo	Q544894	
Stamford and Rutland General Infirmary	II	Deeping Road			TF0367607505; 52°39′19″N 0°28′08″W		1062264	Upload Photo	Q544894	
Fryers' Callis	II	Easton Road			TF0302606578; 52°38′50″N 0°28′43″W		1062265	Upload Photo	Q544894	
12, Exeter Court	II	12, Exeter Court			TF0258807004; 52°39′04″N 0°29′06″W		1308380	Upload Photo	Q544894	
Burghley Lodges (west Gate) and Gateway Arches	II	Gates And Flanking Walls, St. Martin's Without, Burghley Park, City Of Peterborough			TF0325306370; 52°38′43″N 0°28′31″W		1127505	Upload Photo	Q544894	
Wall and Entrance Gateway to St Michael's Churchyard in Maiden Lane	II	High Street			TF0312407150; 52°39′08″N 0°28′37″W		1062234	Wall and Entrance Gateway to St Michael's Churchyard in Maiden Lane	Q544894	
Church of St Michael	II	High Street			TF0307307168; 52°39′09″N 0°28′40″W		1168253	Church of St Michael	Q544894	
K6 Telephone Kiosk Outside the Library	II	High Street			TF0309707204; 52°39′10″N 0°28′39″W		1253873	K6 Telephone Kiosk Outside the Library More images	Q26545588	
Public Library	II	High Street			TF0310007218; 52°39′10″N 0°28′38″W		1360402	Public Library	Q544894	
4, High Street	II	4, High Street			TF0293607134; 52°39′08″N 0°28′47″W		1062266	4, High Street More images	Q26315656	
6, High Street	II	6, High Street			TF0295107142; 52°39′08″N 0°28′46″W		1062267	6, High Street More images	Q26315657	
7, High Street	II*	7, High Street			TF0295807150; 52°39′08″N 0°28′46″W		1147799	7, High Street More images	Q17549906	
8, High Street	II	8, High Street			TF0296607152; 52°39′08″N 0°28′46″W		1062225	8, High Street More images	Q26315627	
9, High Street	II	9, High Street			TF0297307152; 52°39′08″N 0°28′45″W		1062226	9, High Street More images	Q26315628	
10, High Street	II	10, High Street			TF0298007155; 52°39′08″N 0°28′45″W		1360398	10, High Street More images	Q26642507	
11 and 12, High Street	II*	11 and 12, High Street			TF0298607159; 52°39′09″N 0°28′45″W		1062227	11 and 12, High Street More images	Q17549570	
13, High Street	II	13, High Street			TF0299407161; 52°39′09″N 0°28′44″W		1360399	13, High Street More images	Q26642508	
14, High Street	II*	14, High Street			TF0300107162; 52°39′09″N 0°28′44″W		1062228	14, High Street More images	Q17549573	
15-17, High Street	II*	15-17, High Street			TF0301307165; 52°39′09″N 0°28′43″W		1062229	15-17, High Street More images	Q17549577	
18 and 19, High Street	II*	18 and 19, High Street			TF0302707174; 52°39′09″N 0°28′42″W		1360400	18 and 19, High Street More images	Q17550510	
20, High Street	II*	20, High Street			TF0303607179; 52°39′09″N 0°28′42″W		1062230	20, High Street More images	Q17549581	
21 and 21a, High Street	II*	21 and 21a, High Street			TF0304007183; 52°39′09″N 0°28′42″W		1360401	21 and 21a, High Street More images	Q17550516	
22 and 22a, High Street	II	22 and 22a, High Street			TF0305707192; 52°39′10″N 0°28′41″W		1062231	22 and 22a, High Street	Q544894	
23 and 24, High Street	II*	23 and 24, High Street			TF0307307201; 52°39′10″N 0°28′40″W		1062232	23 and 24, High Street More images	Q17549585	
25-27, High Street	II	25-27, High Street			TF0308807204; 52°39′10″N 0°28′39″W		1168216	25-27, High Street More images	Q26493700	
28 and 29, High Street	II	28 and 29, High Street			TF0311107216; 52°39′10″N 0°28′38″W		1062233	28 and 29, High Street More images	Q26315630	
30, High Street	II	30, High Street			TF0311907225; 52°39′11″N 0°28′37″W		1168238	30, High Street More images	Q26493720	
31, High Street	II	31, High Street			TF0312407225; 52°39′11″N 0°28′37″W		1360403	31, High Street More images	Q26642510	
53, High Street	II	53, High Street			TF0305107159; 52°39′09″N 0°28′41″W		1253890	53, High Street More images	Q26545599	
54 and 55, High Street	II	54 and 55, High Street			TF0304507158; 52°39′09″N 0°28′41″W		1360404	54 and 55, High Street More images	Q26642511	
56, High Street	II	56, High Street			TF0303607145; 52°39′08″N 0°28′42″W		1168258	56, High Street More images	Q26461524	
57, High Street	II	57, High Street			TF0302907141; 52°39′08″N 0°28′42″W		1062235	57, High Street More images	Q26315632	
58, High Street	II	58, High Street			TF0301907138; 52°39′08″N 0°28′43″W		1062236	58, High Street More images	Q26315633	
59, High Street	II	59, High Street			TF0300807139; 52°39′08″N 0°28′43″W		1168272	59, High Street More images	Q26461536	
61 and 62, High Street	II	61 and 62, High Street			TF0299207130; 52°39′08″N 0°28′44″W		1360405	61 and 62, High Street	Q544894	
63, High Street	II	63, High Street			TF0298807122; 52°39′07″N 0°28′45″W		1307059	63, High Street More images	Q26593768	
64, High Street	II	64, High Street			TF0297907122; 52°39′07″N 0°28′45″W		1062237	64, High Street More images	Q26315634	
Lloyds Bank	II	65, High Street			TF0297307119; 52°39′07″N 0°28′45″W		1360366	Lloyds Bank More images	Q26642480	
68 and 69, High Street	II	68 and 69, High Street			TF0295507109; 52°39′07″N 0°28′46″W		1307076	Upload Photo	Q544894	
70, High Street	II	70, High Street			TF0294607103; 52°39′07″N 0°28′47″W		1062238	Upload Photo	Q544894	
71, High Street	II*	71, High Street			TF0293907102; 52°39′07″N 0°28′47″W		1062239	71, High Street More images	Q17549591	
72, High Street	II	72, High Street			TF0293007103; 52°39′07″N 0°28′48″W		1307042	72, High Street More images	Q26593754	
73, High Street	II	73, High Street			TF0292107101; 52°39′07″N 0°28′48″W		1360367	73, High Street More images	Q26642481	
1, Ironmonger Street	II	1, Ironmonger Street			TF0302607248; 52°39′11″N 0°28′42″W		1168357	1, Ironmonger Street More images	Q26461615	
2, Ironmonger Street	II	2, Ironmonger Street			TF0302707239; 52°39′11″N 0°28′42″W		1062240	2, Ironmonger Street More images	Q26315636	
3, Ironmonger Street	II	3, Ironmonger Street			TF0303107232; 52°39′11″N 0°28′42″W		1360368	3, Ironmonger Street More images	Q26642482	
4, Ironmonger Street	II	4, Ironmonger Street			TF0303707224; 52°39′11″N 0°28′42″W		1168365	4, Ironmonger Street More images	Q26461622	
5, Ironmonger Street	II	5, Ironmonger Street			TF0304507216; 52°39′10″N 0°28′41″W		1062241	5, Ironmonger Street More images	Q26315637	
6, Ironmonger Street	II	6, Ironmonger Street			TF0304807210; 52°39′10″N 0°28′41″W		1062242	6, Ironmonger Street More images	Q26315638	
6a, Ironmonger Street	II	6a, Ironmonger Street			TF0304807201; 52°39′10″N 0°28′41″W		1168393	Upload Photo	Q544894	
7, Ironmonger Street	II*	7, Ironmonger Street			TF0303607187; 52°39′09″N 0°28′42″W		1062243	Upload Photo	Q544894	
8, Ironmonger Street	II	8, Ironmonger Street			TF0303407192; 52°39′10″N 0°28′42″W		1062244	Upload Photo	Q544894	
9 and 10, Ironmonger Street	II*	9 and 10, Ironmonger Street			TF0302707202; 52°39′10″N 0°28′42″W		1307000	9 and 10, Ironmonger Street More images	Q17550232	
11, Ironmonger Street	II	11, Ironmonger Street			TF0302007218; 52°39′11″N 0°28′43″W		1062245	Upload Photo	Q544894	
12-14, Ironmonger Street	II	12-14, Ironmonger Street			TF0301207232; 52°39′11″N 0°28′43″W		1168434	Upload Photo	Q544894	
1, Kings Mill Lane	II	1, Kings Mill Lane			TF0265706917; 52°39′01″N 0°29′02″W		1078191	Upload Photo	Q544894	
The Vale House	II	2, Kings Mill Lane			TF0264906925; 52°39′01″N 0°29′03″W		1062246	Upload Photo	Q544894	
3, King's Mill Lane	II	3, King's Mill Lane			TF0264406937; 52°39′02″N 0°29′03″W		1062204	3, King's Mill Lane More images	Q26315611	
1-13, Lumby's Terrace	II	1-13, Lumby's Terrace			TF0316606839; 52°38′58″N 0°28′35″W		1062205	Upload Photo	Q544894	
14 and 15, Lumby's Terrace	II	14 and 15, Lumby's Terrace			TF0317806810; 52°38′57″N 0°28′35″W		1360387	Upload Photo	Q544894	
King's Head Public House	II	Maiden Lane			TF0311407158; 52°39′08″N 0°28′38″W		1062209	King's Head Public House	Q544894	
2 and 3, Maiden Lane	II	2 and 3, Maiden Lane			TF0312107170; 52°39′09″N 0°28′37″W		1062206	2 and 3, Maiden Lane	Q544894	
5 and 6, Maiden Lane	II	5 and 6, Maiden Lane			TF0313407153; 52°39′08″N 0°28′37″W		1062207	5 and 6, Maiden Lane More images	Q26315614	
7 and 8, Maiden Lane	II	7 and 8, Maiden Lane			TF0313607147; 52°39′08″N 0°28′37″W		1360388	7 and 8, Maiden Lane	Q544894	
9 and 10, Maiden Lane	II	9 and 10, Maiden Lane			TF0314107136; 52°39′08″N 0°28′36″W		1062208	9 and 10, Maiden Lane More images	Q26315615	
Orme House	II	13, Maiden Lane			TF0314707105; 52°39′07″N 0°28′36″W		1360389	Orme House More images	Q26642499	
Uffington Park	II	Main Road, Uffington, PE9 4SN			TF0568607445; 52°39′16″N 0°26′21″W		1470336	Upload Photo	Q544894	
Spa Cistern at Ngr Sp 019059	II	Mill Lane			TF0190605989; 52°38′31″N 0°29′43″W		1261576	Spa Cistern at Ngr Sp 019059 More images	Q26552512	
Town Wall to North of North Walk House	II	North Street			TF0289207300; 52°39′13″N 0°28′49″W		1062903	Upload Photo	Q544894	
Remains of St Leonard's Priory	I	Priory Road			TF0389007372; 52°39′15″N 0°27′56″W		1062210	Remains of St Leonard's Priory More images	Q7593999	
Wall of Former Grey Friary Fronting Priory Road and Brazenose Lane	II	Priory Road			TF0347607276; 52°39′12″N 0°28′18″W		1062211	Upload Photo	Q544894	
Priory Farmhouse	II	Priory Road			TF0393307358; 52°39′14″N 0°27′54″W		1360390	Upload Photo	Q544894	
Public Waiting Room	II	Red Lion Square			TF0287407098; 52°39′07″N 0°28′51″W		1360392	Public Waiting Room More images	Q26642502	
1, Red Lion Square	II	1, Red Lion Square			TF0290607147; 52°39′08″N 0°28′49″W		1168514	1, Red Lion Square	Q544894	
2, Red Lion Square	II	2, Red Lion Square			TF0291007141; 52°39′08″N 0°28′49″W		1360391	2, Red Lion Square	Q544894	
6, Red Lion Square	II*	6, Red Lion Square			TF0289807096; 52°39′07″N 0°28′49″W		1062212	6, Red Lion Square More images	Q17549548	
7, Red Lion Square	II	7, Red Lion Square			TF0289007089; 52°39′06″N 0°28′50″W		1168550	7, Red Lion Square More images	Q26461799	
8-10, Red Lion Square	II	8-10, Red Lion Square			TF0286807118; 52°39′07″N 0°28′51″W		1062213	8-10, Red Lion Square More images	Q26315618	
1, Red Lion Street	II	1, Red Lion Street			TF0290707163; 52°39′09″N 0°28′49″W		1168566	1, Red Lion Street More images	Q26461813	
2, Red Lion Street	II	2, Red Lion Street			TF0291207169; 52°39′09″N 0°28′49″W		1062214	2, Red Lion Street More images	Q544894	
3, Red Lion Street	II	3, Red Lion Street			TF0291607175; 52°39′09″N 0°28′48″W		1168577	3, Red Lion Street More images	Q26461822	
5, Red Lion Street	II	5, Red Lion Street			TF0293907176; 52°39′09″N 0°28′47″W		1062215	5, Red Lion Street	Q544894	
7, Red Lion Street	II	7, Red Lion Street			TF0292707165; 52°39′09″N 0°28′48″W		1168615	7, Red Lion Street More images	Q544894	
8 and 9, Red Lion Street	II	8 and 9, Red Lion Street			TF0292307162; 52°39′09″N 0°28′48″W		1360394	8 and 9, Red Lion Street	Q544894	
10, Red Lion Street	II	10, Red Lion Street			TF0291707150; 52°39′08″N 0°28′48″W		1062216	10, Red Lion Street More images	Q26315621	
Hudds Mill	II	River Welland			TF0423507404; 52°39′16″N 0°27′38″W		1127510	Upload Photo	Q544894	
1-10, Rock Terrace	II	1-10, Rock Terrace, Scotgate, PE9 2YJ			TF0249007233; 52°39′11″N 0°29′11″W		1062927	Upload Photo	Q544894	
1-19, Rutland Terrace	II	1-19, Rutland Terrace, PE9 2QD			TF0246006915; 52°39′01″N 0°29′13″W		1062217	Upload Photo	Q544894	
Rock House	II	Scotgate			TF0250407291; 52°39′13″N 0°29′10″W		1062928	Upload Photo	Q544894	
Brewery House	II	4, Scotgate			TF0275707142; 52°39′08″N 0°28′57″W		1170253	Upload Photo	Q544894	
The Scotgate Public House	II	5, Scotgate			TF0274207149; 52°39′08″N 0°28′58″W		1062924	Upload Photo	Q544894	
Truesdale's Hospital	II	13, Scotgate			TF0268407176; 52°39′09″N 0°29′01″W		1062925	Upload Photo	Q544894	
Snowden's Hospital	II	14, Scotgate			TF0266607176; 52°39′09″N 0°29′02″W		1170284	Upload Photo	Q544894	
29, Scotgate	II	29, Scotgate			TF0253707219; 52°39′11″N 0°29′08″W		1062926	Upload Photo	Q544894	
31, Scotgate	II	31, Scotgate			TF0252707229; 52°39′11″N 0°29′09″W		1170298	Upload Photo	Q544894	
The Crown and Woolpack Public House	II	51, Scotgate			TF0260607229; 52°39′11″N 0°29′05″W		1170332	Upload Photo	Q544894	
52, Scotgate	II	52, Scotgate			TF0262207231; 52°39′11″N 0°29′04″W		1062929	Upload Photo	Q544894	
57, Scotgate	II	57, Scotgate			TF0263807218; 52°39′11″N 0°29′03″W		1062930	Upload Photo	Q544894	
58, Scotgate	II	58, Scotgate			TF0264407216; 52°39′11″N 0°29′03″W		1170342	Upload Photo	Q544894	
59, Scotgate	II	59, Scotgate			TF0265007220; 52°39′11″N 0°29′02″W		1062931	Upload Photo	Q544894	
70-73, Scotgate	II	70-73, Scotgate			TF0279507161; 52°39′09″N 0°28′55″W		1306098	70-73, Scotgate More images	Q26592908	
Golden Fleece Public House	II	Sheep Market			TF0285607080; 52°39′06″N 0°28′52″W		1062933	Golden Fleece Public House More images	Q26316289	
Waiting Room	II	Sheep Market			TF0281107047; 52°39′05″N 0°28′54″W		1170358	Upload Photo	Q544894	
Archway to Rear of No 9 All Saints' Street	II	Sheep Market			TF0279607067; 52°39′06″N 0°28′55″W		1360048	Upload Photo	Q544894	
4, Sheep Market	II	4, Sheep Market			TF0287207053; 52°39′05″N 0°28′51″W		1360047	4, Sheep Market More images	Q26642207	
8, Sheep Market	II	8, Sheep Market			TF0283907035; 52°39′05″N 0°28′53″W		1062932	8, Sheep Market More images	Q26316288	
Outbuilding to No 12	II	St George's Square			TF0323107071; 52°39′06″N 0°28′32″W		1062219	Upload Photo	Q544894	
Church of St George	I	St George's Square			TF0320307083; 52°39′06″N 0°28′33″W		1168674	Church of St George More images	Q7593151	
1, St George's Square	II	1, St George's Square			TF0316807094; 52°39′06″N 0°28′35″W		1360395	1, St George's Square More images	Q544894	
2-4, St George's Square	II	2-4, St George's Square			TF0317507094; 52°39′06″N 0°28′35″W		1062218	2-4, St George's Square	Q544894	
5-7, St George's Square	II	5-7, St George's Square			TF0319607110; 52°39′07″N 0°28′33″W		1168729	5-7, St George's Square More images	Q26461969	
9, St George's Square	II	9, St George's Square			TF0322807098; 52°39′06″N 0°28′32″W		1360396	9, St George's Square	Q544894	
10-12, St George's Square	II	10-12, St George's Square			TF0323207078; 52°39′06″N 0°28′32″W		1168748	10-12, St George's Square	Q544894	
14 and 15, St George's Square	II*	14 and 15, St George's Square			TF0323807049; 52°39′05″N 0°28′31″W		1360397	14 and 15, St George's Square	Q544894	
St George's Rectory	II	16, St George's Square			TF0321207051; 52°39′05″N 0°28′33″W		1306853	St George's Rectory	Q544894	
17, St George's Square	II	17, St George's Square			TF0320207055; 52°39′05″N 0°28′33″W		1062220	17, St George's Square	Q544894	
18, St George's Square	II*	18, St George's Square			TF0318807054; 52°39′05″N 0°28′34″W		1062221	18, St George's Square More images	Q17549553	
19, St George's Square	II*	19, St George's Square			TF0317607056; 52°39′05″N 0°28′35″W		1168787	19, St George's Square More images	Q17549972	
20, St George's Square	II*	20, St George's Square			TF0316507058; 52°39′05″N 0°28′35″W		1062222	20, St George's Square More images	Q17549558	
21, St George's Square	II*	21, St George's Square			TF0315407057; 52°39′05″N 0°28′36″W		1062223	21, St George's Square More images	Q17549563	
Assembly Rooms	II*	22, St George's Square			TF0314207060; 52°39′05″N 0°28′36″W		1168799	Assembly Rooms More images	Q17549986	
1-3, St George's Street	II	1-3, St George's Street			TF0318507233; 52°39′11″N 0°28′34″W		1062224	1-3, St George's Street	Q544894	
6, St George's Street	II	6, St George's Street			TF0320507189; 52°39′09″N 0°28′33″W		1062183	6, St George's Street More images	Q26315590	
8, St George's Street	II	8, St George's Street			TF0320807164; 52°39′09″N 0°28′33″W		1428774	8, St George's Street	Q544894	
9, 10 and 11, St George's Street	II	9, 10 and 11, St George's Street			TF0321407146; 52°39′08″N 0°28′32″W		1360416	Upload Photo	Q544894	
17, St George's Street	II	17, St George's Street			TF0319707129; 52°39′07″N 0°28′33″W		1062185	17, St George's Street More images	Q26315592	
18, St George's Street	II	18, St George's Street			TF0319707134; 52°39′08″N 0°28′33″W		1062186	18, St George's Street	Q544894	
23 and 24, St George's Street	II	23 and 24, St George's Street			TF0319207181; 52°39′09″N 0°28′34″W		1360417	23 and 24, St George's Street More images	Q26642518	
25, St George's Street	II	25, St George's Street			TF0318707194; 52°39′10″N 0°28′34″W		1062187	25, St George's Street More images	Q26315595	
26, St George's Street	II	26, St George's Street			TF0318807199; 52°39′10″N 0°28′34″W		1360418	26, St George's Street More images	Q26642519	
27 and 28, St George's Street	II	27 and 28, St George's Street			TF0318207206; 52°39′10″N 0°28′34″W		1062188	27 and 28, St George's Street	Q544894	
Church of St John the Baptist	I	St John's Street			TF0292607086; 52°39′06″N 0°28′48″W		1360419	Church of St John the Baptist More images	Q7593733	
1-3, St John's Street	II	1-3, St John's Street			TF0292907055; 52°39′05″N 0°28′48″W		1062189	1-3, St John's Street More images	Q26315597	
11 and 12, St John's Street	II	11 and 12, St John's Street			TF0289807074; 52°39′06″N 0°28′49″W		1062190	11 and 12, St John's Street More images	Q26315598	
1, St Leonard's Street	II	1, St Leonard's Street			TF0320707185; 52°39′09″N 0°28′33″W		1062184	1, St Leonard's Street	Q544894	
1, St Leonard's Street	II	1, St Leonard's Street			TF0321007187; 52°39′09″N 0°28′33″W		1168975	Upload Photo	Q544894	
2, St Leonard's Street	II	2, St Leonard's Street			TF0321507189; 52°39′09″N 0°28′32″W		1360420	2, St Leonard's Street	Q544894	
3, St Leonard's Street	II	3, St Leonard's Street			TF0322107190; 52°39′09″N 0°28′32″W		1062191	3, St Leonard's Street More images	Q26315599	
6 and 7, St Leonard's Street	II	6 and 7, St Leonard's Street			TF0323807199; 52°39′10″N 0°28′31″W		1168989	6 and 7, St Leonard's Street More images	Q544894	
9, St Leonard's Street	II	9, St Leonard's Street			TF0328807209; 52°39′10″N 0°28′28″W		1360421	9, St Leonard's Street	Q544894	
10 and 11, St Leonard's Street	II	10 and 11, St Leonard's Street			TF0333107220; 52°39′10″N 0°28′26″W		1306726	10 and 11, St Leonard's Street	Q544894	
15-17, St Leonard's Street	II	15-17, St Leonard's Street			TF0337107233; 52°39′11″N 0°28′24″W		1062192	15-17, St Leonard's Street	Q544894	
18 and 19, St Leonard's Street	II	18 and 19, St Leonard's Street			TF0337907237; 52°39′11″N 0°28′24″W		1062193	18 and 19, St Leonard's Street	Q544894	
Reindeer Inn	II	20, St Leonard's Street			TF0338607237; 52°39′11″N 0°28′23″W		1169021	Reindeer Inn	Q544894	
22-24, St Leonard's Street	II	22-24, St Leonard's Street			TF0340707249; 52°39′11″N 0°28′22″W		1360422	22-24, St Leonard's Street	Q544894	
32 and 33, St Leonard's Street	II	32 and 33, St Leonard's Street			TF0344707240; 52°39′11″N 0°28′20″W		1062194	32 and 33, St Leonard's Street	Q544894	
42-45, St Leonard's Street	II	42-45, St Leonard's Street			TF0336807208; 52°39′10″N 0°28′24″W		1169040	42-45, St Leonard's Street	Q544894	
54, St Leonard's Street	II	54, St Leonard's Street			TF0331207190; 52°39′09″N 0°28′27″W		1360423	54, St Leonard's Street	Q544894	
59, St Leonard's Street	II	59, St Leonard's Street			TF0327407183; 52°39′09″N 0°28′29″W		1169047	59, St Leonard's Street More images	Q26462265	
60, St Leonard's Street	II	60, St Leonard's Street			TF0326607179; 52°39′09″N 0°28′30″W		1062195	60, St Leonard's Street	Q544894	
61, St Leonard's Street	II	61, St Leonard's Street			TF0322607168; 52°39′09″N 0°28′32″W		1062196	61, St Leonard's Street More images	Q26315604	
62, St Leonard's Street	II*	62, St Leonard's Street			TF0321607166; 52°39′09″N 0°28′32″W		1306706	62, St Leonard's Street More images	Q17550226	
63, St Leonard's Street	II	63, St Leonard's Street			TF0321207166; 52°39′09″N 0°28′33″W		1360424	63, St Leonard's Street	Q544894	
Wall to No 44	II	St Martin's			TF0315306634; 52°38′52″N 0°28′36″W		1062171	Upload Photo	Q544894	
Garden Wall to Nos 68 and 69	II	St Martin's			TF0306606830; 52°38′58″N 0°28′41″W		1062177	Upload Photo	Q544894	
The Bridge	II	St Martin's			TF0305506934; 52°39′01″N 0°28′41″W		1062178	The Bridge More images	Q26315586	
Church of St Martin	I	St Martin's			TF0311206788; 52°38′57″N 0°28′38″W		1169102	Church of St Martin More images	Q4505065	
Garden Wall to No 43	II	St Martin's			TF0317606585; 52°38′50″N 0°28′35″W		1169237	Upload Photo	Q544894	
Burghley Almshouses (Lord Burghley's Hospital)	II*	St Martin's			TF0302406903; 52°39′00″N 0°28′43″W		1360415	Burghley Almshouses (Lord Burghley's Hospital) More images	Q17550545	
Anchor Hotel	II	1, St Martin's			TF0307106908; 52°39′00″N 0°28′40″W		1062197	Upload Photo	Q544894	
4, St Martin's	II	4, St Martin's			TF0307406882; 52°39′00″N 0°28′40″W		1169061	4, St Martin's	Q544894	
5 and 6, St Martin's	II	5 and 6, St Martin's			TF0307406872; 52°38′59″N 0°28′40″W		1360425	5 and 6, St Martin's More images	Q26642525	
7, St Martin's	II	7, St Martin's			TF0308006867; 52°38′59″N 0°28′40″W		1306714	7, St Martin's	Q544894	
8-10, St Martin's	II*	8-10, St Martin's			TF0307406858; 52°38′59″N 0°28′40″W		1062198	8-10, St Martin's More images	Q17549543	
11, St Martin's	II*	11, St Martin's			TF0307506847; 52°38′58″N 0°28′40″W		1360386	11, St Martin's More images	Q17550500	
12, St Martin's	II	12, St Martin's			TF0307906839; 52°38′58″N 0°28′40″W		1306682	12, St Martin's	Q544894	
18, St Martin's	II	18, St Martin's			TF0308806814; 52°38′57″N 0°28′40″W		1062199	18, St Martin's	Q544894	
19, St Martin's	II	19, St Martin's			TF0309406807; 52°38′57″N 0°28′39″W		1062200	19, St Martin's	Q544894	
20, St Martin's	II	20, St Martin's			TF0311606763; 52°38′56″N 0°28′38″W		1062201	20, St Martin's More images	Q26315608	
21, St Martin's	II	21, St Martin's			TF0312106757; 52°38′56″N 0°28′38″W		1169113	21, St Martin's More images	Q26462326	
22, St Martin's	II	22, St Martin's			TF0312406750; 52°38′55″N 0°28′38″W		1062202	Upload Photo	Q544894	
23, St Martin's	II	23, St Martin's			TF0313006744; 52°38′55″N 0°28′37″W		1062203	23, St Martin's More images	Q544894	
23a, St Martin's	II	23a, St Martin's			TF0313106730; 52°38′55″N 0°28′37″W		1306694	23a, St Martin's More images	Q26593444	
24, St Martin's	II*	24, St Martin's			TF0314406713; 52°38′54″N 0°28′37″W		1062161	24, St Martin's More images	Q17549495	
24a, St Martin's	II*	24a, St Martin's			TF0315006696; 52°38′54″N 0°28′36″W		1062162	24a, St Martin's More images	Q17549501	
Bull and Swan Inn	II*	25, St Martin's			TF0315306684; 52°38′53″N 0°28′36″W		1062163	Upload Photo	Q544894	
26, St Martin's	II	26, St Martin's			TF0315906672; 52°38′53″N 0°28′36″W		1360444	Upload Photo	Q544894	
Stamford High School for Girls	II	27, 28 and 29, St Martin's			TF0316606659; 52°38′52″N 0°28′36″W		1062164	Upload Photo	Q544894	
30, St Martin's	II*	30, St Martin's			TF0317206645; 52°38′52″N 0°28′35″W		1360406	30, St Martin's More images	Q17550521	
31, St Martin's	II	31, St Martin's			TF0317506637; 52°38′52″N 0°28′35″W		1062165	Upload Photo	Q544894	
32, St Martin's	II	32, St Martin's			TF0317906627; 52°38′51″N 0°28′35″W		1062166	Upload Photo	Q544894	
33, St Martin's	II*	33, St Martin's			TF0318406613; 52°38′51″N 0°28′35″W		1360407	33, St Martin's More images	Q17550526	
34, St Martin's	II*	34, St Martin's			TF0319806594; 52°38′50″N 0°28′34″W		1062167	34, St Martin's More images	Q17549512	
35, St Martin's	II*	35, St Martin's			TF0319906586; 52°38′50″N 0°28′34″W		1360408	35, St Martin's More images	Q17550530	
36, St Martin's	II*	36, St Martin's			TF0320806561; 52°38′49″N 0°28′33″W		1062168	36, St Martin's More images	Q17549518	
37 and 38, St Martin's	II	37 and 38, St Martin's			TF0321406538; 52°38′48″N 0°28′33″W		1062169	Upload Photo	Q544894	
39-41, St Martin's	II	39-41, St Martin's			TF0319206533; 52°38′48″N 0°28′34″W		1360409	39-41, St Martin's More images	Q544894	
St Martin's Guest House	II*	42, St Martin's			TF0318206548; 52°38′49″N 0°28′35″W		1169212	St Martin's Guest House More images	Q17550025	
43, St Martin's	II*	43, St Martin's			TF0316406596; 52°38′50″N 0°28′36″W		1062170	43, St Martin's More images	Q17549523	
Music School of Stamford High School	II	44, St Martin's			TF0314706619; 52°38′51″N 0°28′37″W		1360410	Upload Photo	Q544894	
45, St Martin's	II*	45, St Martin's			TF0314506646; 52°38′52″N 0°28′37″W		1169247	45, St Martin's More images	Q17550031	
46, St Martin's	II*	46, St Martin's			TF0314006657; 52°38′52″N 0°28′37″W		1062172	Upload Photo	Q544894	
47-50, St Martin's	II*	47-50, St Martin's			TF0313106670; 52°38′53″N 0°28′37″W		1360411	47-50, St Martin's More images	Q17550535	
51, St Martin's	II*	51, St Martin's			TF0312006682; 52°38′53″N 0°28′38″W		1169273	51, St Martin's More images	Q17550036	
52, St Martin's	II*	52, St Martin's			TF0311606688; 52°38′53″N 0°28′38″W		1062173	Upload Photo	Q544894	
53, St Martin's	II*	53, St Martin's			TF0311006708; 52°38′54″N 0°28′39″W		1169304	Upload Photo	Q544894	
The Gables	II	54, St Martin's			TF0310406726; 52°38′55″N 0°28′39″W		1360412	Upload Photo	Q544894	
55, St Martin's	II	55, St Martin's			TF0309806730; 52°38′55″N 0°28′39″W		1062174	55, St Martin's More images	Q26315582	
56, St Martin's	II	56, St Martin's			TF0309406738; 52°38′55″N 0°28′39″W		1169324	Upload Photo	Q544894	
57 and 58, St Martin's	II	57 and 58, St Martin's			TF0309406748; 52°38′55″N 0°28′39″W		1062175	57 and 58, St Martin's More images	Q26315583	
59 and 60, St Martin's	II	59 and 60, St Martin's			TF0308506763; 52°38′56″N 0°28′40″W		1360413	59 and 60, St Martin's More images	Q26642516	
61-63, St Martin's	II	61-63, St Martin's			TF0307806776; 52°38′56″N 0°28′40″W		1169341	Upload Photo	Q544894	
64 and 65, St Martin's	II	64 and 65, St Martin's			TF0307006799; 52°38′57″N 0°28′41″W		1062176	Upload Photo	Q544894	
66 and 67, St Martins	II*	66 and 67, St Martins			TF0306506815; 52°38′57″N 0°28′41″W		1360414	66 and 67, St Martins More images	Q17550540	
68 and 69, St Martin's	II*	68 and 69, St Martin's			TF0305706839; 52°38′58″N 0°28′41″W		1169363	68 and 69, St Martin's More images	Q17550044	
The George Hotel	II*	70, St Martin's			TF0305506858; 52°38′59″N 0°28′41″W		1169387	The George Hotel More images	Q5540759	
The Riverside Club	II	St Mary's Hill			TF0306206954; 52°39′02″N 0°28′41″W		1169487	The Riverside Club More images	Q26462679	
Townhall	II*	1, St Mary's Hill			TF0305407017; 52°39′04″N 0°28′41″W		1306544	Townhall More images	Q17550221	
Municipal Offices	II*	2, St Mary's Hill			TF0305606989; 52°39′03″N 0°28′41″W		1062179	Municipal Offices More images	Q17549538	
3, St Mary's Hill	II	3, St Mary's Hill			TF0306106976; 52°39′03″N 0°28′41″W		1062180	3, St Mary's Hill More images	Q26315587	
4, St Mary's Hill	II	4, St Mary's Hill			TF0304206955; 52°39′02″N 0°28′42″W		1062181	4, St Mary's Hill More images	Q26315588	
5, St Mary's Hill	II	5, St Mary's Hill			TF0304206962; 52°39′02″N 0°28′42″W		1169518	5, St Mary's Hill More images	Q26462711	
8, St Mary's Hill	II	8, St Mary's Hill			TF0303806976; 52°39′03″N 0°28′42″W		1062182	8, St Mary's Hill More images	Q26315589	
9, St Mary's Hill	II	9, St Mary's Hill			TF0303706985; 52°39′03″N 0°28′42″W		1360023	9, St Mary's Hill More images	Q26642189	
10, St Mary's Hill	II	10, St Mary's Hill, PE9 2DP			TF0303306999; 52°39′03″N 0°28′42″W		1062958	10, St Mary's Hill More images	Q26316314	
11 and 12, St Mary's Hill	II	11 and 12, St Mary's Hill, PE9 2DP			TF0302807008; 52°39′04″N 0°28′43″W		1360024	11 and 12, St Mary's Hill More images	Q26642190	
13, St Mary's Hill	II	13, St Mary's Hill			TF0302707016; 52°39′04″N 0°28′43″W		1062959	13, St Mary's Hill More images	Q26316315	
14 and 15, St Mary's Hill	II	14 and 15, St Mary's Hill			TF0302307028; 52°39′04″N 0°28′43″W		1062960	14 and 15, St Mary's Hill More images	Q26316316	
16, St Mary's Hill	II	16, St Mary's Hill			TF0301807038; 52°39′05″N 0°28′43″W		1360025	16, St Mary's Hill	Q544894	
Church of St Mary	I	St Mary's Place			TF0304307054; 52°39′05″N 0°28′42″W		1062961	Church of St Mary More images	Q7594428	
1, St Mary's Place	II*	1, St Mary's Place			TF0307007059; 52°39′05″N 0°28′40″W		1360026	1, St Mary's Place More images	Q17550310	
2, St Mary's Place	II*	2, St Mary's Place			TF0307307049; 52°39′05″N 0°28′40″W		1062962	2, St Mary's Place More images	Q17549824	
3, St Mary's Place	II*	3, St Mary's Place			TF0307607039; 52°39′05″N 0°28′40″W		1062963	3, St Mary's Place More images	Q17549827	
4, St Mary's Place	II*	4, St Mary's Place			TF0307307023; 52°39′04″N 0°28′40″W		1360027	4, St Mary's Place More images	Q17550315	
2, St Mary's Street	II	2, St Mary's Street			TF0293607054; 52°39′05″N 0°28′47″W		1062964	2, St Mary's Street More images	Q26316318	
3, St Mary's Street	II	3, St Mary's Street			TF0294007055; 52°39′05″N 0°28′47″W		1360028	3, St Mary's Street More images	Q26642192	
4, St Mary's Street	II*	4, St Mary's Street			TF0294607054; 52°39′05″N 0°28′47″W		1306445	4, St Mary's Street More images	Q17550211	
5 and 6, St Mary's Street	II	5 and 6, St Mary's Street			TF0295507061; 52°39′05″N 0°28′46″W		1062965	5 and 6, St Mary's Street More images	Q26316319	
7, St Mary's Street	II	7, St Mary's Street			TF0296807063; 52°39′06″N 0°28′46″W		1062966	7, St Mary's Street More images	Q26316320	
8, St Mary's Street	II	8, St Mary's Street			TF0297507062; 52°39′05″N 0°28′45″W		1169677	8, St Mary's Street More images	Q26462856	
9, St Mary's Street	II	9, St Mary's Street			TF0298007062; 52°39′05″N 0°28′45″W		1062967	9, St Mary's Street More images	Q26316321	
No 10 (including Warehouse Behind)	II	St Mary's Street			TF0298907061; 52°39′05″N 0°28′45″W		1169694	No 10 (including Warehouse Behind) More images	Q26462871	
11 and 12, St Mary's Street	II*	11 and 12, St Mary's Street			TF0299607074; 52°39′06″N 0°28′44″W		1062968	11 and 12, St Mary's Street More images	Q17549832	
13, St Mary's Street	II*	13, St Mary's Street			TF0300307072; 52°39′06″N 0°28′44″W		1062969	13, St Mary's Street	Q544894	
14, St Mary's Street	II*	14, St Mary's Street			TF0301607076; 52°39′06″N 0°28′43″W		1306425	14, St Mary's Street More images	Q17550205	
15 and 15a, St Mary's Street	II*	15 and 15a, St Mary's Street			TF0303007077; 52°39′06″N 0°28′42″W		1062970	15 and 15a, St Mary's Street More images	Q17549841	
Stamford Hotel	II*	16, St Mary's Street			TF0304907082; 52°39′06″N 0°28′41″W		1062971	Stamford Hotel More images	Q17549845	
17, St Mary's Street	II	17, St Mary's Street			TF0306407092; 52°39′06″N 0°28′41″W		1306399	17, St Mary's Street More images	Q26593184	
18, St Mary's Street	II	18, St Mary's Street			TF0306807095; 52°39′06″N 0°28′40″W		1062972	18, St Mary's Street More images	Q26316322	
The Vaults Public House	II	19, St Mary's Street			TF0308607103; 52°39′07″N 0°28′39″W		1169751	The Vaults Public House More images	Q26462925	
20, St Mary's Street	II*	20, St Mary's Street			TF0309307105; 52°39′07″N 0°28′39″W		1062973	20, St Mary's Street More images	Q17549849	
21, St Mary's Street	II*	21, St Mary's Street			TF0309707106; 52°39′07″N 0°28′39″W		1360029	21, St Mary's Street More images	Q17550320	
22, St Mary's Street	II*	22, St Mary's Street			TF0311007105; 52°39′07″N 0°28′38″W		1169808	22, St Mary's Street More images	Q17550052	
23, St Mary's Street	II*	23, St Mary's Street			TF0312407106; 52°39′07″N 0°28′37″W		1062974	23, St Mary's Street More images	Q17549853	
24, St Mary's Street	II*	24, St Mary's Street			TF0313207108; 52°39′07″N 0°28′37″W		1360030	24, St Mary's Street More images	Q17550325	
25 and 26, St Mary's Street	II*	25 and 26, St Mary's Street			TF0314907095; 52°39′06″N 0°28′36″W		1169809	25 and 26, St Mary's Street More images	Q17550060	
27, St Mary's Street	II*	27, St Mary's Street			TF0313307078; 52°39′06″N 0°28′37″W		1062975	27, St Mary's Street More images	Q17549857	
Old Theatre	II*	27a, St Mary's Street			TF0311907077; 52°39′06″N 0°28′38″W		1062976	Old Theatre More images	Q32676474	
St Mary's Rectory	II	28, St Mary's Street			TF0310307074; 52°39′06″N 0°28′38″W		1306363	St Mary's Rectory More images	Q26593150	
28a, St Mary's Street	II	28a, St Mary's Street			TF0309607074; 52°39′06″N 0°28′39″W		1360031	28a, St Mary's Street More images	Q26642193	
29, St Mary's Street	II	29, St Mary's Street			TF0307907073; 52°39′06″N 0°28′40″W		1306327	29, St Mary's Street More images	Q26593119	
29a, St Mary's Street	II	29a, St Mary's Street			TF0307407074; 52°39′06″N 0°28′40″W		1062977	29a, St Mary's Street More images	Q26316323	
30, St Mary's Street	II	30, St Mary's Street			TF0306807068; 52°39′06″N 0°28′40″W		1360032	30, St Mary's Street More images	Q26642194	
31 and 32, St Mary's Street	II	31 and 32, St Mary's Street			TF0301107043; 52°39′05″N 0°28′43″W		1169842	31 and 32, St Mary's Street	Q544894	
33, St Mary's Street	II	33, St Mary's Street			TF0300207043; 52°39′05″N 0°28′44″W		1062978	33, St Mary's Street	Q544894	
34, 34a and 35, St Mary's Street	II	34, 34a and 35, St Mary's Street			TF0299607041; 52°39′05″N 0°28′44″W		1062979	34, 34a and 35, St Mary's Street	Q544894	
36, St Mary's Street	II	36, St Mary's Street			TF0298407038; 52°39′05″N 0°28′45″W		1062937	Upload Photo	Q544894	
37-9, St Mary's Street	II	37-9, St Mary's Street			TF0297107034; 52°39′05″N 0°28′46″W		1360051	37-9, St Mary's Street	Q544894	
40, St Mary's Street	II	40, St Mary's Street			TF0295007018; 52°39′04″N 0°28′47″W		1062938	40, St Mary's Street More images	Q26316294	
42, St Mary's Street	II	42, St Mary's Street			TF0293207021; 52°39′04″N 0°28′48″W		1360052	42, St Mary's Street More images	Q26642212	
44, St Mary's Street	II	44, St Mary's Street			TF0292007021; 52°39′04″N 0°28′48″W		1062939	44, St Mary's Street More images	Q26316295	
Brazenose School House (part of Stamford School)	II*	St Paul's Street			TF0331807324; 52°39′14″N 0°28′27″W		1062946	Brazenose School House (part of Stamford School) More images	Q99671019	
Two Barns to the East of No 28 (one Now School Library)	II	St Paul's Street			TF0333207333; 52°39′14″N 0°28′26″W		1169972	Two Barns to the East of No 28 (one Now School Library)	Q544894	
Conduit Head	II	St Paul's Street			TF0325507298; 52°39′13″N 0°28′30″W		1169990	Conduit Head	Q544894	
Chapel of Stamford School	II	St Paul's Street			TF0330407359; 52°39′15″N 0°28′27″W		1360016	Chapel of Stamford School	Q544894	
Brazenose College Gate. Retaining Walls of College	I	St Paul's Street			TF0337907358; 52°39′15″N 0°28′23″W		1360017	Brazenose College Gate. Retaining Walls of College More images	Q17532120	
4, St Paul's Street	II	4, St Paul's Street			TF0318707263; 52°39′12″N 0°28′34″W		1062940	4, St Paul's Street More images	Q26316297	
No 7 (including Small Building at Rear)	II	St Paul's Street			TF0320507287; 52°39′13″N 0°28′33″W		1360013	No 7 (including Small Building at Rear) More images	Q26642182	
8 and 9, St Paul's Street	II	8 and 9, St Paul's Street			TF0321207293; 52°39′13″N 0°28′32″W		1062941	8 and 9, St Paul's Street More images	Q26316298	
10 and 11, St Paul's Street	II	10 and 11, St Paul's Street			TF0322207298; 52°39′13″N 0°28′32″W		1360014	10 and 11, St Paul's Street More images	Q26642183	
12, St Paul's Street	II*	12, St Paul's Street			TF0322807302; 52°39′13″N 0°28′32″W		1062942	12, St Paul's Street More images	Q17549810	
13, St Paul's Street	II	13, St Paul's Street			TF0323507310; 52°39′13″N 0°28′31″W		1062943	13, St Paul's Street More images	Q26316299	
14, St Paul's Street	II	14, St Paul's Street			TF0324507314; 52°39′13″N 0°28′31″W		1360015	14, St Paul's Street More images	Q26642184	
15, St Paul's Street	II	15, St Paul's Street			TF0325207319; 52°39′14″N 0°28′30″W		1169929	15, St Paul's Street More images	Q26463126	
Bursar's House	II*	16, St Paul's Street			TF0325707325; 52°39′14″N 0°28′30″W		1062944	Bursar's House More images	Q17549817	
24, St Paul's Street	II	24, St Paul's Street			TF0337807374; 52°39′15″N 0°28′24″W		1306271	24, St Paul's Street	Q544894	
The O'Briens Arms Public House	II	25, St Paul's Street			TF0338107378; 52°39′15″N 0°28′23″W		1062945	The O'Briens Arms Public House	Q544894	
Clapton House	II*	30, St Paul's Street			TF0328807310; 52°39′13″N 0°28′28″W		1169988	Clapton House	Q544894	
31, St Paul's Street	II	31, St Paul's Street			TF0328007304; 52°39′13″N 0°28′29″W		1062947	31, St Paul's Street	Q544894	
32 and 33, St Paul's Street	II	32 and 33, St Paul's Street			TF0327107300; 52°39′13″N 0°28′29″W		1062948	32 and 33, St Paul's Street More images	Q26316304	
41 and 42, St Paul's Street	II	41 and 42, St Paul's Street			TF0321007264; 52°39′12″N 0°28′33″W		1360018	41 and 42, St Paul's Street More images	Q26642185	
Manor Farm Dairy	II	44, St Paul's Street			TF0320407256; 52°39′12″N 0°28′33″W		1062949	Manor Farm Dairy	Q544894	
45, St Paul's Street	II	45, St Paul's Street			TF0319907250; 52°39′11″N 0°28′33″W		1306248	45, St Paul's Street	Q544894	
Wall in Yard Abutting on No 33	II	St Peter's Hill			TF0262907055; 52°39′05″N 0°29′04″W		1062918	Upload Photo	Q544894	
Premises Occupied by Ymca Youth Centre	II	St Peter's Hill			TF0272307063; 52°39′06″N 0°28′59″W		1062952	Upload Photo	Q544894	
3, St Peter's Hill	II	3, St Peter's Hill			TF0270207004; 52°39′04″N 0°29′00″W		1062950	Upload Photo	Q544894	
4, St Peter's Hill	II	4, St Peter's Hill			TF0270307010; 52°39′04″N 0°29′00″W		1170004	Upload Photo	Q544894	
5, St Peter's Hill	II	5, St Peter's Hill			TF0270107014; 52°39′04″N 0°29′00″W		1062951	5, St Peter's Hill More images	Q26316307	
6, St Peter's Hill	II*	6, St Peter's Hill			TF0269507024; 52°39′04″N 0°29′00″W		1360019	6, St Peter's Hill More images	Q17550304	
7, St Peter's Hill	II	7, St Peter's Hill			TF0269707053; 52°39′05″N 0°29′00″W		1170012	Upload Photo	Q544894	
9, St Peter's Hill	II	9, St Peter's Hill, PE9 2PE			TF0273107066; 52°39′06″N 0°28′58″W		1062953	Upload Photo	Q544894	
Stabling to Rear of No 37	II	St Peter's Street			TF0266007053; 52°39′05″N 0°29′02″W		1062921	Upload Photo	Q544894	
Archway on Site of St Peter's Gate	II	St Peter's Street			TF0253106951; 52°39′02″N 0°29′09″W		1062957	Upload Photo	Q544894	
Hopkin's Hospital	II	1-8, St Peter's Street			TF0254406932; 52°39′02″N 0°29′08″W		1306216	Upload Photo	Q544894	
1, St Peter's Street	II	1, St Peter's Street			TF0269107021; 52°39′04″N 0°29′00″W		1306227	1, St Peter's Street More images	Q544894	
2, St Peter's Street	II	2, St Peter's Street			TF0268607016; 52°39′04″N 0°29′01″W		1360020	Upload Photo	Q544894	
3, St Peter's Street	II*	3, St Peter's Street			TF0267407017; 52°39′04″N 0°29′01″W		1170050	Upload Photo	Q544894	
Wells House	II	4, St Peter's Street			TF0266007009; 52°39′04″N 0°29′02″W		1062954	Wells House More images	Q26316310	
8 and 9, St Peter's Street	II	8 and 9, St Peter's Street			TF0263406990; 52°39′03″N 0°29′04″W		1360021	Upload Photo	Q544894	
9a, St Peter's Street	II	9a, St Peter's Street			TF0262006980; 52°39′03″N 0°29′04″W		1170060	Upload Photo	Q544894	
11, St Peter's Street	II	11, St Peter's Street			TF0260606968; 52°39′03″N 0°29′05″W		1360022	Upload Photo	Q544894	
14, St Peter's Street	II	14, St Peter's Street			TF0259106962; 52°39′03″N 0°29′06″W		1170088	Upload Photo	Q544894	
15, St Peter's Street	II	15, St Peter's Street, PE9 2PQ			TF0258406956; 52°39′02″N 0°29′06″W		1062956	15, St Peter's Street More images	Q26316312	
26, St Peter's Street	II	26, St Peter's Street			TF0260106991; 52°39′03″N 0°29′05″W		1360040	Upload Photo	Q544894	
27, St Peter's Street	II	27, St Peter's Street			TF0260306998; 52°39′04″N 0°29′05″W		1062915	Upload Photo	Q544894	
28, St Peter's Street	II	28, St Peter's Street			TF0261106998; 52°39′04″N 0°29′05″W		1360041	28, St Peter's Street	Q544894	
29, St Peter's Street	II	29, St Peter's Street			TF0261507000; 52°39′04″N 0°29′05″W		1062916	Upload Photo	Q544894	
30, St Peter's Street	II	30, St Peter's Street			TF0262207008; 52°39′04″N 0°29′04″W		1360042	Upload Photo	Q544894	
31 and 32, St Peter's Street	II	31 and 32, St Peter's Street			TF0262807012; 52°39′04″N 0°29′04″W		1062917	31 and 32, St Peter's Street More images	Q26316270	
33, St Peter's Street	II	33, St Peter's Street			TF0264507024; 52°39′04″N 0°29′03″W		1360043	33, St Peter's Street More images	Q26642204	
34, St Peter's Street	II	34, St Peter's Street			TF0265007032; 52°39′05″N 0°29′03″W		1062919	Upload Photo	Q544894	
35 and 36, St Peter's Street	II*	35 and 36, St Peter's Street			TF0266107036; 52°39′05″N 0°29′02″W		1360044	35 and 36, St Peter's Street More images	Q17550342	
37, St Peter's Street	II	37, St Peter's Street			TF0267107039; 52°39′05″N 0°29′01″W		1062920	Upload Photo	Q544894	
38, St Peter's Street	II	38, St Peter's Street			TF0268607049; 52°39′05″N 0°29′01″W		1360045	Upload Photo	Q544894	
The Mill Cottage	II	St Peters Vale, PE9 2QT			TF0269506919; 52°39′01″N 0°29′00″W		1062923	Upload Photo	Q544894	
King's Mill	II	St Peter's Vale			TF0268806901; 52°39′00″N 0°29′01″W		1306167	Upload Photo	Q544894	
1, St Peter's Vale	II	1, St Peter's Vale			TF0269606949; 52°39′02″N 0°29′00″W		1170213	Upload Photo	Q544894	
2, St Peter's Vale	II	2, St Peter's Vale			TF0271606941; 52°39′02″N 0°28′59″W		1062922	Upload Photo	Q544894	
5, St Peter's Vale	II	5, St Peter's Vale			TF0268006918; 52°39′01″N 0°29′01″W		1360046	Upload Photo	Q544894	
10, St. Peters Street	II	10, St. Peters Street, PE9 2PQ			TF0261206980; 52°39′03″N 0°29′05″W		1062955	10, St. Peters Street More images	Q26316311	
Victorian Bandstand	II	Stamford Recreation Ground, Recreation Ground Road			TF0291207541; 52°39′21″N 0°28′48″W		1389639	Upload Photo	Q544894	
Premises Formerly Occupied by T Gibson and Sons	II	Star Lane			TF0317807313; 52°39′13″N 0°28′34″W		1062934	Premises Formerly Occupied by T Gibson and Sons	Q544894	
Congregational Church	II	Star Lane			TF0318607300; 52°39′13″N 0°28′34″W		1170369	Congregational Church	Q544894	
K6 Telephone Kiosk Outside Lord Burghley's Hospital	II	Station Road			TF0304806888; 52°39′00″N 0°28′42″W		1062902	Upload Photo	Q544894	
Stamford Town Railway Station Including Waiting Shelter, Footbridge And Two Stone Piers	II*	Station Road			TF0290706649; 52°38′52″N 0°28′49″W		1366147	Upload Photo	Q544894	
Windmill Cottage	II	8, Tinwell Road			TF0232506865; 52°39′00″N 0°29′20″W		1360049	Upload Photo	Q544894	
Hudds Mill	II	Uffington Road			TF0423607406; 52°39′16″N 0°27′38″W		1261587	Upload Photo	Q544894	
Welland House (junior House of Girls' High School)	II*	Water Street			TF0320506871; 52°38′59″N 0°28′33″W		1062936	Welland House (junior House of Girls' High School)	Q544894	
South View	II	Water Street			TF0344506927; 52°39′01″N 0°28′20″W		1222365	Upload Photo	Q544894	
Row of Cottages to Rear of No 10	II	Water Street			TF0329806852; 52°38′58″N 0°28′28″W		1261574	Upload Photo	Q544894	
Goods Shed East South East of Former Stamford East Railway Station	II	Water Street			TF0350806927; 52°39′01″N 0°28′17″W		1331240	Upload Photo	Q544894	
2, Water Street	II	2, Water Street			TF0312806898; 52°39′00″N 0°28′37″W		1170404	2, Water Street	Q544894	
3, Water Street	II	3, Water Street			TF0313506899; 52°39′00″N 0°28′37″W		1062898	3, Water Street	Q544894	
4, Water Street	II	4, Water Street			TF0314206899; 52°39′00″N 0°28′37″W		1306073	4, Water Street	Q544894	
9, Water Street	II	9, Water Street			TF0338106898; 52°39′00″N 0°28′24″W		1261561	9, Water Street More images	Q26552501	
10, Water Street	II	10, Water Street			TF0328406889; 52°39′00″N 0°28′29″W		1342123	10, Water Street	Q544894	
The Beehive Public House	II	12, Water Street			TF0325806882; 52°38′59″N 0°28′30″W		1062935	Upload Photo	Q544894	
14, Water Street	II	14, Water Street			TF0323806872; 52°38′59″N 0°28′32″W		1170393	14, Water Street	Q544894	
15, Water Street	II	15, Water Street			TF0323106876; 52°38′59″N 0°28′32″W		1360050	15, Water Street	Q544894	
Bastion	I	West Street			TF0251006974; 52°39′03″N 0°29′10″W		1360072	Bastion More images	Q17532171	
Remains of Bastion of Town Wall	II	Wharf Road			TF0315806952; 52°39′02″N 0°28′36″W		1170422	Upload Photo	Q544894	
Archway to Messrs Gray and Sons Warehouse	II	Wharf Road			TF0329107051; 52°39′05″N 0°28′28″W		1360033	Upload Photo	Q544894	
5, Wharf Road	II	5, Wharf Road			TF0329807080; 52°39′06″N 0°28′28″W		1062899	Upload Photo	Q544894	
Tivoli Cottage	II	Wothorpe			TF0301606697; 52°38′54″N 0°28′44″W		1170436	Tivoli Cottage	Q544894	
7, Wothorpe	II	7, Wothorpe			TF0304406660; 52°38′52″N 0°28′42″W		1062901	7, Wothorpe	Q544894	
Westholme	II	1, Wothorpe Road			TF0300906714; 52°38′54″N 0°28′44″W		1062900	Upload Photo	Q544894	
3, Wothorpe Road	II	3, Wothorpe Road			TF0301306706; 52°38′54″N 0°28′44″W		1360034	3, Wothorpe Road	Q544894	
4, Wothorpe Road	II	4, Wothorpe Road			TF0303006648; 52°38′52″N 0°28′43″W		1306082	4, Wothorpe Road	Q544894	

== See also ==
- Grade I listed buildings in Lincolnshire
- Grade II* listed buildings in Lincolnshire

== Sources ==
- Pevsner, Nikolaus; Harris, John; Antram, Nicholas (1989) [1954], Lincolnshire, The Buildings of England, New Haven and London: Yale University Press, ISBN 978-0-300-09620-0
