= George St Paul =

English politician

Escutcheon of the St Paul baronets of Snarford

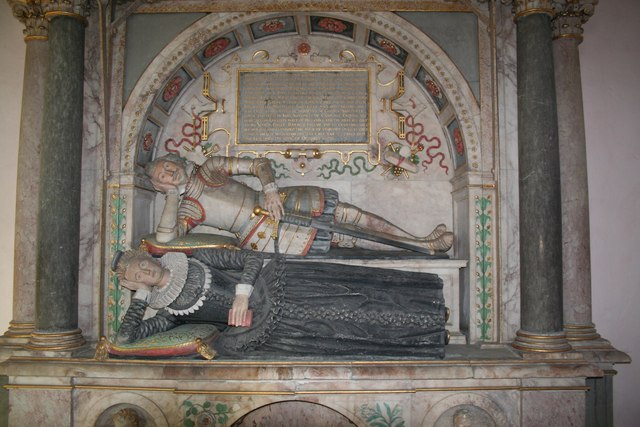
Tomb of Sir George St Paul and his wife, St Lawrence's Church, Snarford, Lincolnshire

Sir George St Paul, 1st Baronet (1562 – 18 October 1613) was an English politician.

He was born the son of Thomas St Paul (or Thomas St Poll) of Snarford, Lincolnshire and educated at Corpus Christi College, Oxford. He entered Lincoln's Inn in 1580. He married Frances, the daughter of Sir Christopher Wray, although they had no children.

He was appointed High Sheriff of Lincolnshire in 1588 and elected as knight of the shire (MP) for Lincolnshire in 1589 and 1593. He was the Member of Parliament for Grimsby in 1604–1611. He was knighted in 1608, and was created a baronet in 1611.

He built Snarford Hall in Snarford, Lincolnshire.

When he died in 1613 his estate devolved upon his sister, Faith, Lady Tyrwhitt.

Baronetage of England
New creation	Baronet (of Snarford); 1611–1613	Extinct
Preceded by Brudenell baronets	St Paul baronets 29 June 1611	Succeeded by Tyrwhitt baronets
