= Fred Atkin =

English footballer

Personal information
- Date of birth: 1887
- Place of birth: Caistor, England
- Date of death: 1964 (aged 76–77)
- Height: 5 ft 11 in (1.80 m)
- Position: Full-back

Senior career*
Years	Team	Apps	(Gls)
1910–1912	Tottenham Hotspur	0	(0)
1912–1913	Kingston-on-Thames		
1913	Grimsby Town	0	(0)
1913	Scunthorpe & Lindsey United		
1913–1915	Grimsby Town	12	(0)
- * Club domestic league appearances and goals

Fred Atkin (1887–1964) was an English professional footballer who played as a full-back.
