= Thomas St Poll =

16th-century English politician

Thomas St Poll (c. 1539 – 1582) was the member of Parliament for Great Grimsby in 1571 and Lincolnshire in 1572.

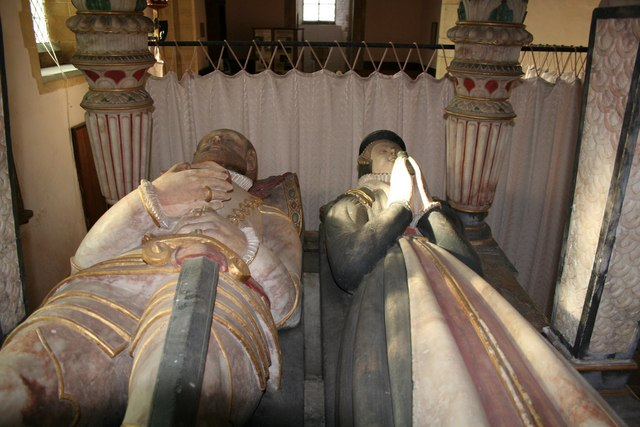

He was knighted in 1580.

== Monument ==
He is buried at Snarford, where St Lawrence's Church is notable for its monuments. There are effigies of Sir Thomas and his wife Lady Faith.

== See also ==
His heir George St Paul also had a parliamentary career.
