= Carr baronets =

Extinct baronetcy in the Baronetage of England

- Escutcheon of the Carr baronets of Sleaford
- Creation date: 1611
- Status: extinct
- Extinction date: 1683

The Carr Baronetcy, of Sleaford in the County of Lincolnshire, is a title in the Baronetage of England. It was created on 29 June 1611 for Edward Carr who was Sheriff of Lincolnshire in 1614. The 3rd Baronet was Chancellor of the Duchy of Lancaster and a Member of Parliament for Lincolnshire in the House of Commons.

== Carr baronets, of Sleaford (1611) ==
- Sir Edward Carr, 1st Baronet (died 1618), married (1) Catherine Bolle, (2) (Lucy) Anne Dyer (died 1639).
- Sir Robert Carr, 2nd Baronet (c. 1615 – 1667), married Mary Gargrave daughter of Sir Richard Gargrave of Kingsley and Nostell.
- Sir Robert Carr, 3rd Baronet (c. 1637 – 1682)
- Sir Edward Carr, 4th Baronet (c. 1665 – 1683)
- Sir Rochester Carr, 5th Baronet (c. 1617 – 1695) (Title extinct on his death)

Baronetage of England
Preceded by Tyrwhitt baronets	Carr baronets 29 June 1611	Succeeded by Hussey baronets
