= Tyrwhitt baronets of Stainfield (1611) =

Escutcheon of the Tyrwhitt baronets of Stainfield

The Tyrwhitt Baronetcy, of Stainfield in the County of Lincoln, was created in the Baronetage of England on 29 June 1611 for Philip Tyrwhitt. The fourth Baronet represented Grimsby in the House of Commons. The fifth and sixth Baronets both sat as Members of Parliament for Lincoln. The title became extinct on the latter's death in 1760.

== Tyrwhitt baronets, of Stainfield (1611) ==
- Sir Philip Tyrwhitt, 1st Baronet (died 1624)
- Sir Edward Tyrwhitt, 2nd Baronet (1577–1628)
- Sir Philip Tyrwhitt, 3rd Baronet (1598–c. 1667)
- Sir Philip Tyrwhitt, 4th Baronet (1633–1688)
- Sir John Tyrwhitt, 5th Baronet (c. 1663–1741)
- Sir John de la Fountain Tyrwhitt, 6th Baronet (1708–1760)

== Notes ==
Baronetage of England
Preceded by St Paul baronets	Tyrwhitt baronets 29 June 1611	Succeeded by Carr baronets
