= St Paul baronets =

Set index for St Paul baronets

There have been two baronetcies for the surname St Paul, one in the Baronetage of England and one in the Baronetage of the United Kingdom. Both are extinct.

- St Paul baronets of Snarford (1611): see George St Paul
- St Paul baronets of Ewart Park (1813)
