= Harpswell, Lincolnshire =

Village and civil parish in the West Lindsey district of Lincolnshire, England

Coordinates: 53.397195°N 0.594494°W

Harpswell
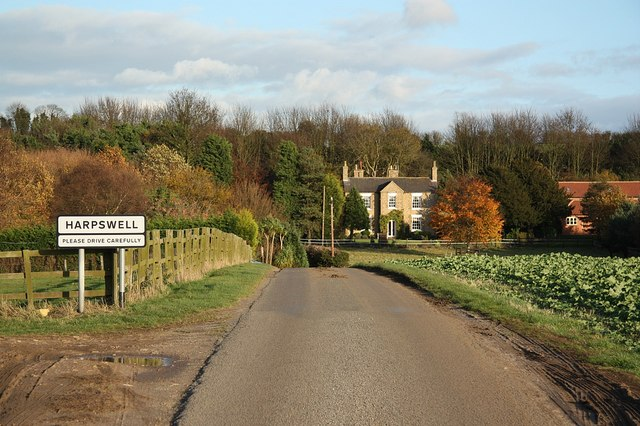
- Harpswell

- Location within Lincolnshire
- Population: 391 (Combined Hemswell+Harpswell 2011census)
- OS grid reference: SK935898
  - London: 130 mi (210 km) S
- District: West Lindsey
- Shire county: Lincolnshire
- Region: East Midlands
- Country: England
- Sovereign state: United Kingdom
- Post town: Gainsborough
- Postcode district: DN21
- Police: Lincolnshire
- Fire: Lincolnshire
- Ambulance: East Midlands
- UK Parliament: Gainsborough

Harpswell is a village and civil parish in the West Lindsey district of Lincolnshire, England. It is situated just west off the junction of the A631 and B1398, and 12 miles (19 km) north from the city and county town of Lincoln.

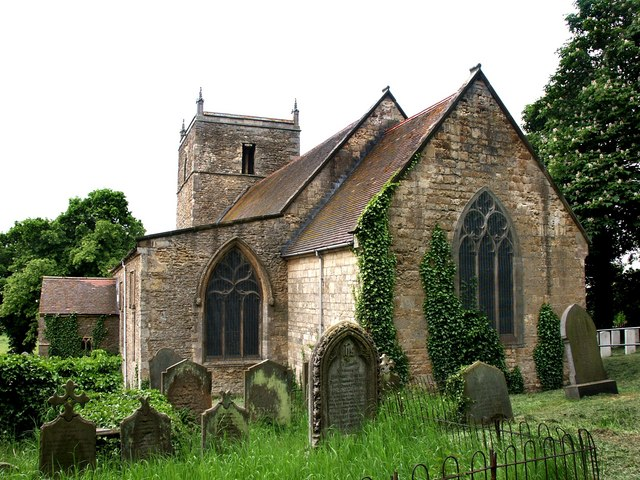
Church of St Chad, Harpswell

According to the 2001 census Harpswell had a population of 65. In 2011 the Office for National Statistics issued combined results for Hemswell and Harpswell, totalling 391 in 179 households.

In 1918 the Royal Flying Corps opened an airfield north of the village (but in Hemswell parish), known as RFCS Harpswell. The site was returned to farmland after the First World War, but in the 1930s RAF Hemswell was built on the site.

The parish church of St Chad's has a Saxon tower and was restored around 1890. It is a Grade I listed building.
