= Normanby by Spital =

Village and civil parish in Lincolnshire, England

Coordinates: 53.380600°N 0.496719°W

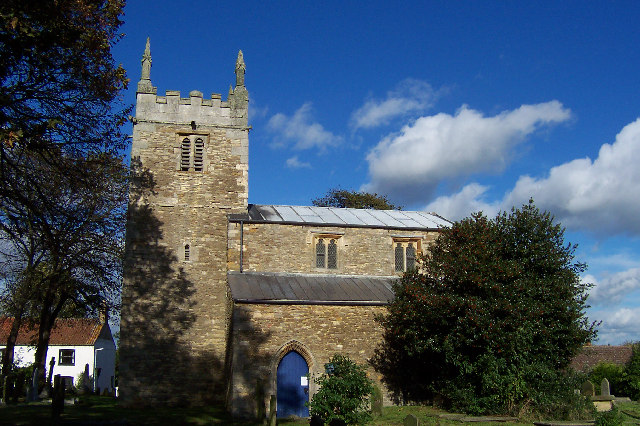
- St Peter's Church, Normanby by Spital

- Location within Lincolnshire
- Population: 402 (2011)
- OS grid reference: TF000881
  - London: 130 mi (210 km) S
- District: West Lindsey
- Shire county: Lincolnshire
- Region: East Midlands
- Country: England
- Sovereign state: United Kingdom
- Post town: Market Rasen
- Postcode district: LN8
- Dialling code: 01673
- Police: Lincolnshire
- Fire: Lincolnshire
- Ambulance: East Midlands
- UK Parliament: Gainsborough

Normanby by Spital is a village and civil parish in the West Lindsey district of Lincolnshire, England. According to the 2001 census it had a population of 318, increasing to 412 at the 2011 census. It is approximately 10 miles (16 km) north from Lincoln, and just off the A15. The village is part of the Owmby Group of parishes.

The name Normanby is from the Old English and Old Scandinavian Northman+by, or "Northman village". In the 1086 Domesday Book, the village is given as Normanebi.

Normanby by Spital also has a neighbouring village called Owmby-by-Spital.

St. Peter's Church dates from the 12th century and is a Grade I listed building. It is redundant and maintained by the Churches Conservation Trust. The church is dedicated to St. Peter and St. Paul. It was extensively renovated in 1890 and it currently seats 100 people. There was a Methodist chapel but now it has been converted into a habitable accommodation.

The village facilities include a primary school, a post office, a store, The Bottle and Glass public house, and a school hall. The school hall holds activities such as a youth club and an art club.

Normanby by Spital primary school received a 2006 Ofsted inspection rating of Grade 1 (outstanding). A following 2010 inspection rated the school as Grade 2 (good).

During the Second World War, a wireless station was in operation along Normanby Cliff Road which was connected to RAF Scampton and was used to transmit messages to Bomber Squadrons over Germany or other enemy territory. Each Bomber Command Group had a similar site and they could be found all over the east of the country. The R/T operators were based at RAF Bawtry, Doncaster. This role continued throughout the "Cold War" period when transmissions were made to the 24/7 airborne V-Bomber squadrons. In later years this role diminished and the station finally closed; the buildings have now been demolished although the site is still fenced off. The Bottle and Glass public house was open for duration of the war, as it was a frequent rest-stop for local airmen. Residents of the village remember the Dambusters raid, hearing the Lancasters going overhead and being concerned that they were "struggling" to keep in the air.
