= Newsham Bridge =

Bridge in Lincolnshire, England

Coordinates: 53.6054°N 0.2908°W

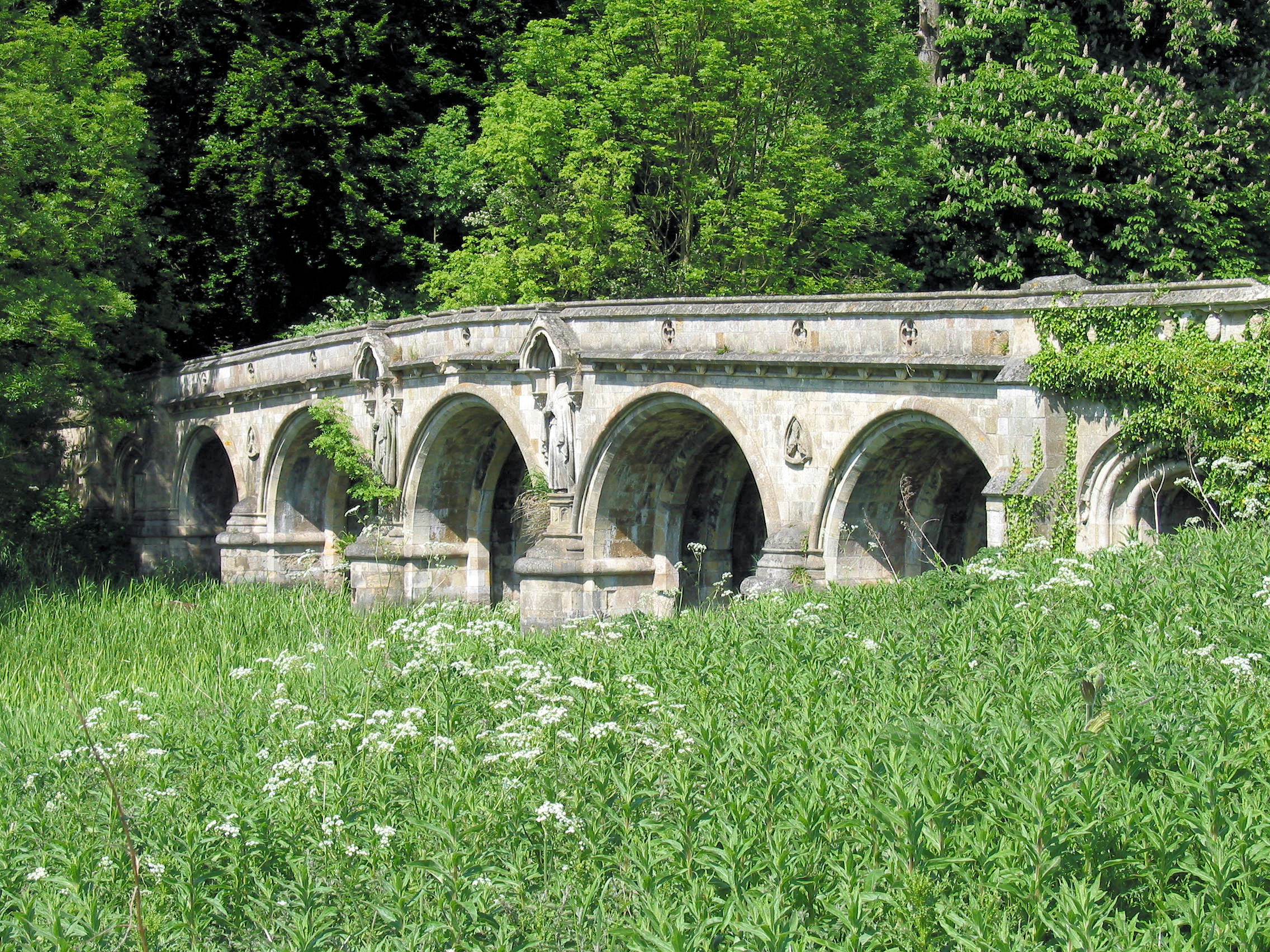
Newsham Bridge

Newsham Bridge is a Grade I listed structure in Brocklesby Park, part of the estate of the Earls of Yarborough in West Lindsey, Lincolnshire, England. Constructed around 1772 in the Gothic Revival style, it is probably the work of Lancelot "Capability" Brown, who at that time redesigned some features of the estate, including Newsham Lake, over which the bridge passes. Many sculptural details of the bridge are broken or defaced, and it is currently listed on English Heritage's Heritage at Risk Register.
