= St Peter and St Paul Church, Caistor =

Anglican church in Caistor, Lincolnshire, England

- Church of Saint Peter and Saint Paul, Caistor
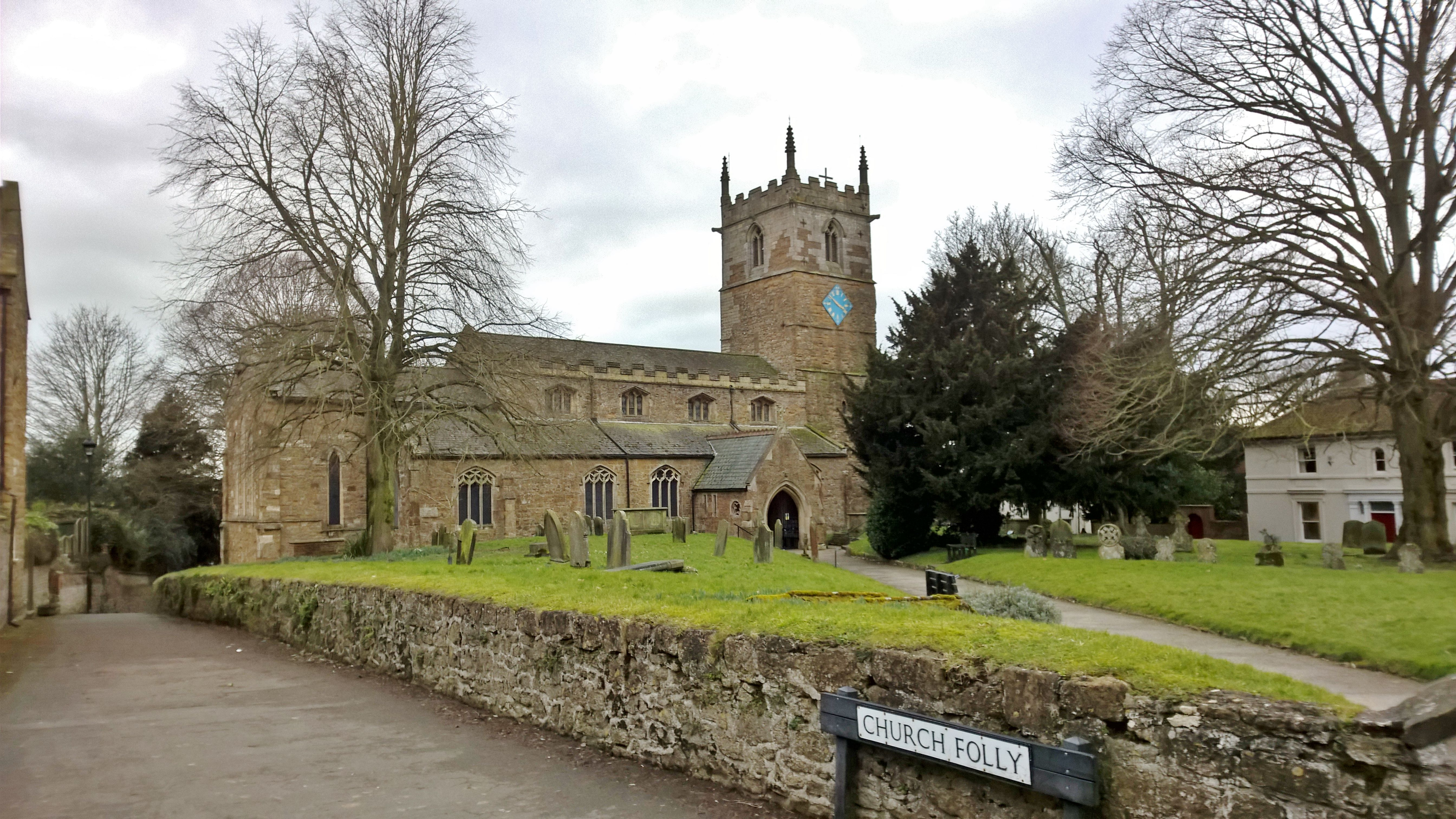
- St Peter and St Paul Church, Caistor
- St Peter and St Paul Church, Caistor
- 53.496369°N 0.318023°W
- OS grid reference: TA 11677 01274
- Location: Caistor, West Lindsey, Lincolnshire
- Country: England
- Denomination: Church of England
- Website: caistorparishchurch.co.uk

History
- Status: Parish Church
- Dedication: Saint Peter and Saint Paul
- Dedicated: 1050
- Consecrated: 1050

Architecture
- Functional status: Active
- Heritage designation: Grade I
- Completed: 1050 AD

Administration
- Province: Canterbury
- Diocese: Lincoln
- Parish: Caistor

St Peter and St Paul Church is the parish church of the town of Caistor in Lincolnshire, England. It is dedicated to Saint Peter and Paul the Apostle and is a Grade I listed building. It is located on Church Street and to the west of the town centre. The tower is a prominent landmark in the town.

== History ==
The site of the church has been occupied since the 7th century and the present church dates back to around the 11th century. The church was given a Grade I listing by Historic England in 1966.

== Present day ==
The church serves as a local landmark and place of worship and community gatherings.

== The Gad Whip ==
The church houses, in a glass case, a whip 6 feet long with a lash of 7 ft 1 in, attached to which is a purse which previously contained 30 silver coins (one penny of Edward I remains), and three pieces of wych elm wood (originally four). This was used in a ceremony on each Palm Sunday until 1846, in connection with a tenancy agreement for a property in Broughton.
