= St Chad's Church, Harpswell =

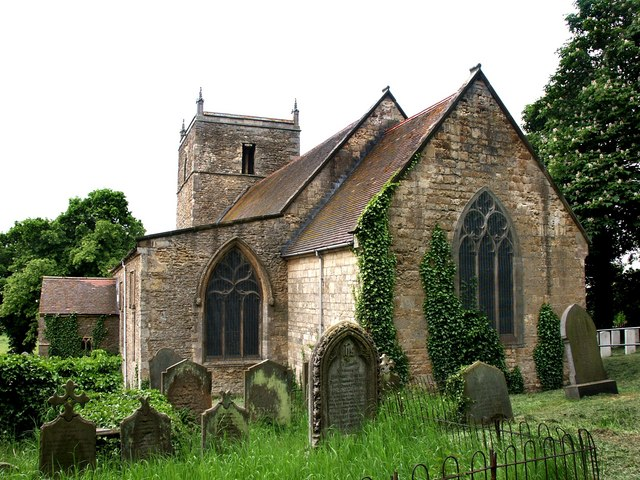
- St Chad's Church, Harpswell
- 53.3982°N 0.5939°W
- Denomination: Church of England
- Churchmanship: Broad Church

History
- Dedication: St. Chad

Administration
- Province: Canterbury
- Diocese: Lincoln
- Archdeaconry: Stow and Lindsey
- Deanery: Corringham
- Parish: Harpswell

Clergy
- Priest: Revd Mark Briscoe

St Chad's Church, Harpswell, is a parish church in the Church of England in Harpswell, Lincolnshire.

== History ==
The ancient church of St Chad in the village of Harpswell, about 12 miles north of the city of Lincoln, was established c.1042 and has one of the few complete Anglo-Saxon towers remaining in England.

The church had thirteenth- and fourteenth-century additions, in particular its Norman south arcade was extended in this period, and the whole church was heavily restored in 1890–91. Research indicates that the church, which stands very close to a spring (one of a number at the foot of the Jurassic limestone scarp with ritual associations) was constructed on a much older pre-Christian ritual site connected with water cults.

It is a Grade I listed building.

== Monuments ==
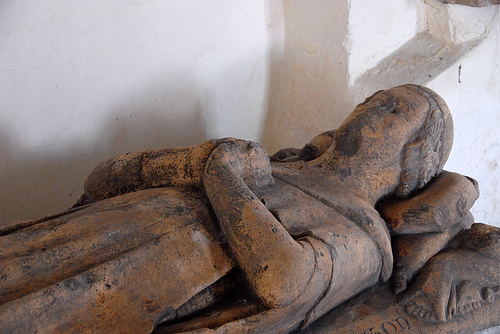
Effigy of William de Harrington, former Rector of St Chad's

There are a number of historical monuments in St Chad's Church, two of the most notable are located in the south aisle and are dedicated to former priests. The largest of these is an effigy of William de Harrington dating from 1346, which shows him reposing on a pillow supported on two angels whilst dressed in cassock, hood and pileolus whilst at his feet are images of the Green Man.

There is also a large stone slab bearing the figure of a fully vested Norman priest of "Harpperswelle" called John Gere, who died around 1300.

On the north wall of the chancel is a fifteenth-century brass of John Whichcote in armour and his wife, Elizabeth Tyrwhit, in a complex butterfly headdress. One of their descendants, Thomas Whichcote, to whom there is also a memorial, was an ardent Royalist and supporter of the Act of Settlement. He introduced the arms of Queen Anne and had a notable memorial stone placed on the tower with above with an inscription commemorating the erection of a clock in 1746 in memory of the Duke of Cumberland's "victory over the rebels" at Culloden. Thomas was also father of Frances Maria Whichcote, who married Rev John Fountayne, the longest serving Dean of York.

== Other notable features ==
There are some exceptional oak bench ends from the mediaeval period, one of which is decorated with the five Holy Wounds.

The stained glass contains fragments of mediaeval glass and the font dates from the Norman period.

A section of the churchyard is set aside for the graves of service personnel. Comprising a Service Plot of four rows, it contains the war graves of a Royal Engineers soldier, eighteen British airmen and one Canadian airman, and six non-World War graves. A former RAF base, RAF Hemswell (formerly known as Harpswell Aerodrome when it was first opened in 1918 by the Royal Flying Corps) adjoins the parish.

== Current use ==
It is part of the Diocese of Lincoln, now under the joint Glentworth Benefice.
