= St Peter's Church, Normanby by Spital =

Coordinates: 53.3804°N 0.4964°W

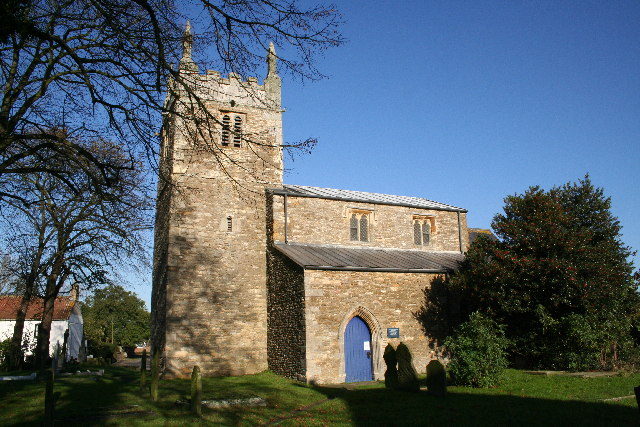
- St Peter's Church, Normanby by Spital, from the south

- Location in Lincolnshire
- OS grid reference: TF 002 882
- Location: Normanby by Spital, Lincolnshire
- Country: England
- Denomination: Anglican
- Website: Churches Conservation Trust

History
- Dedication: Saint Peter, Saint Paul

Architecture
- Functional status: Redundant
- Heritage designation: Grade I
- Designated: 30 November 1966
- Architectural type: Church
- Style: Norman, Gothic

Specifications
- Materials: Limestone with ironstone banding

St Peter's Church is a redundant Anglican church in the village of Normanby by Spital, Lincolnshire, England. It is recorded in the National Heritage List for England as a designated Grade I listed building, and is under the care of the Churches Conservation Trust. The church stands close to the former Roman road, Ermine Street, now the A15 road.

== History ==
St Peter's dates from the 12th century, with additions and alterations in each of the following three centuries. It was restored in 1890, the restoration including rebuilding the south aisle. According to GENUKI it has a dual dedication to Saint Peter and Saint Paul.

== Architecture ==
=== Exterior ===
The church is constructed in limestone rubble, with some ironstone banding, and ashlar dressings. Its plan consists of a nave with a clerestory and north and south aisles, a chancel, and a west tower. The tower dates from the 12th century and is in three stages. Its parapet is embattled, and has pinnacles and gargoyles at the corners. Pieces of stone decorated with chevrons have been incorporated in the fabric of the tower. In the top stage are paired bell openings on the north, west and south sides. In the middle stage is a round-headed window on the south side, and a lancet window on the west. A large vertical stone, possibly a former cross shaft, has been used as a quoin in the northwest corner of the nave. In the west wall of the north aisle is a small 12th-century round-headed window. Its north wall contains a blocked doorway and two 13th-century lancet windows; there is another lancet window in the east wall. In the north wall of the chancel is a blocked doorway which formerly led to a north chapel. The east wall contains a 19th-century two-light window, and outside the east wall are the foundations of a former apse. In the south wall of the chancel is a 14th-century two-light window with a cinquefoil above it. The south aisle has two-light windows with ogee heads in its east and south walls. The south doorway has a pointed arch. In both the north and south sides of the clerestory are two windows with paired lights.

=== Interior ===
The north arcade is Norman in style, dating from about 1200. It has two bays with round arches carried on circular piers. The south arcade has pointed arches, also carried on circular piers. The tower arch is Norman, also dating from about 1200, with a semicircular head. In the east wall of the nave, to the south of the chancel arch, is a blocked squint. At the east end of the north aisle is an altar table dating from the 17th century. The font is from the late 12th century and stands on a 19th-century base. On the west wall of the nave is a painted benefactors board dated 1767. All the other fittings and furniture are from the 19th century. These include a cast iron tortoise stove, originally from Halstead, Essex. There is a ring of three bells, but they are no longer ringable. The oldest was cast in about 1500 in a Nottingham foundry, the second was cast by Henry I Oldfield in 1571, and the third in 1747 by Daniel Hedderly.

== See also ==
- List of churches preserved by the Churches Conservation Trust in the East of England
