= Grade I listed buildings in North East Lincolnshire =

There are over 9,000 Grade I listed buildings in England. This page is a list of these buildings in the district of North East Lincolnshire in Lincolnshire.

== North East Lincolnshire ==
Name	Location	Type	Completed (Note: The date given is the date used by Historic England as significant for the initial building or that of an important part in the structure's description.)	Date designated	Grid ref. (Note: The grid reference is based on the British national grid reference system, sometimes known as OSGB36, used by the Ordnance Survey.) Geo-coordinates	Entry number (Note: The "List Entry Number" is a unique number assigned to each listed building and scheduled monument by Historic England.)	Image
Church of St. Lawrence	Aylesby, North East Lincolnshire	Church	13th century	4 January 1967	TA2028907589; 53°33′04″N 0°11′09″W	1161566	Church of St. Lawrence More images
Church of Saint Helen	Barnoldby Le Beck, North East Lincolnshire	Parish Church	13th century	4 January 1967	TA2355103311; 53°30′43″N 0°08′18″W	1103486	Church of Saint Helen More images
Church of St Nicolas	Great Coates, Great Coates, North East Lincolnshire	Parish Church	c. 1200	4 January 1967	TA2332809784; 53°34′13″N 0°08′21″W	1379843	Church of St Nicolas More images
Church of St Mary	Hatcliffe, North East Lincolnshire	Parish Church	12th century	4 January 1967	TA2131900704; 53°29′21″N 0°10′23″W	1103493	Church of St Mary More images
Church of St. Andrew	Immingham, North East Lincolnshire	Church	12th century	4 January 1967	TA1752015081; 53°37′09″N 0°13′29″W	1310011	Church of St. Andrew More images
Church of Saint Andrew	Irby, North East Lincolnshire	Parish Church	12th century	4 January 1967	TA1959104958; 53°31′40″N 0°11′50″W	1161130	Church of Saint Andrew More images
Church of Saint Margaret	Laceby, North East Lincolnshire	Parish Church	12th century	4 January 1967	TA2143706530; 53°32′29″N 0°10′08″W	1346952	Church of Saint Margaret More images
Church of St Giles	Scartho, North East Lincolnshire	Parish Church	11th century	6 June 1951	TA2673806363; 53°32′19″N 0°05′21″W	1379408	Church of St Giles More images
Church of St James	Grimsby, North East Lincolnshire	Parish Church	13th century	6 June 1951	TA2664009169; 53°33′50″N 0°05′22″W	1379386	Church of St James More images
Church of St Michael	Little Coates, North East Lincolnshire	Church	15th century	6 June 1951	TA2413909020; 53°33′47″N 0°07′38″W	1379845	Church of St Michael More images
Church of the Holy Trinity and Holy Mary the Virgin	Old Clee, North East Lincolnshire	Parish Church	11th century	6 June 1951	TA2899808458; 53°33′25″N 0°03′15″W	1379405	Church of the Holy Trinity and Holy Mary the Virgin More images
The Dock Tower	The Docks, North East Lincolnshire	Tower	1851-1852	28 April 1972	TA2784411348; 53°34′59″N 0°04′13″W	1379870	The Dock Tower More images
