= St Lawrence's Church, Snarford =

Coordinates: 53.3284°N 0.4240°W

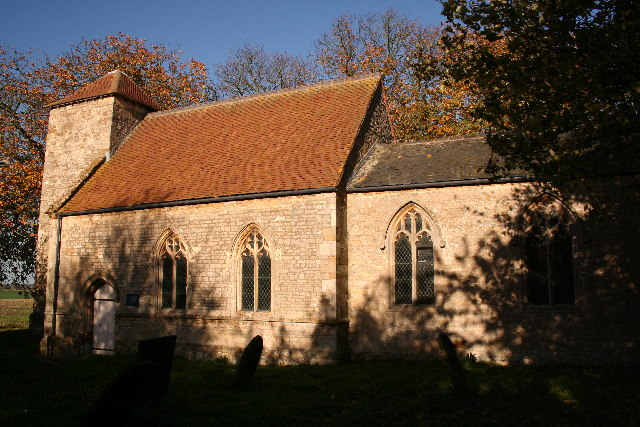
- St Lawrence's Church, Snarford, from the southeast

- Location in Lincolnshire
- OS grid reference: TF 051 825
- Location: Snarford, Lincolnshire
- Country: England
- Denomination: Anglican
- Website: Churches Conservation Trust

History
- Dedication: Saint Lawrence

Architecture
- Functional status: Redundant
- Heritage designation: Grade I
- Designated: 30 November 1966
- Architectural type: Church
- Style: Gothic

Specifications
- Materials: Limestone, tiled roofs

St Lawrence's Church is a redundant Anglican church in the parish of Snarford, Lincolnshire, England. It is recorded in the National Heritage List for England as a designated Grade I listed building, and is under the care of the Churches Conservation Trust. The church stands to the north of the A46 road between Market Rasen and Lincoln. It is a medieval building containing impressive 16th- and 17th-century monuments.

== History ==
The church dates from the 12th century, with additions and alterations in the 14th, 15th and 16th centuries, and a restoration in the 19th century. It served the residents of the nearby Snarford Hall, including the St Paul (or St Pol) family, but nothing now remains of the hall. The church was declared redundant in July 1995.

== Architecture ==
=== Exterior ===
St Lawrence's church is constructed in limestone with tiled roofs. Its plan consists of a nave, a chancel with a north chapel, and a west tower. The tower dates from the 12th century. It has one stage, stands on a plinth, and has a hipped roof. In the west wall of the tower is a 15th-century window, with a 14th-century ogee-headed window above it. The north wall of the nave contains a blocked 14th-century doorway with a pointed arch, and two 15th-century two-light windows. The chapel has a 16th-century two-light west window, and an east window dating from about 1800. The chancel contains more two-light windows, one at the east end, and two in the south wall, and there are two similar windows in the south wall of the nave. The south doorway dates from the 15th century.

=== Interior ===
The tower arch dates from the 14th century and the chancel arch from the 15th century. The octagonal font is from the 15th century; its bowl has panels carved with heads, shields and foliage. The remainder of the fittings are from the 19th century.

=== Monuments ===
St Paul family monuments,
St Lawrence church

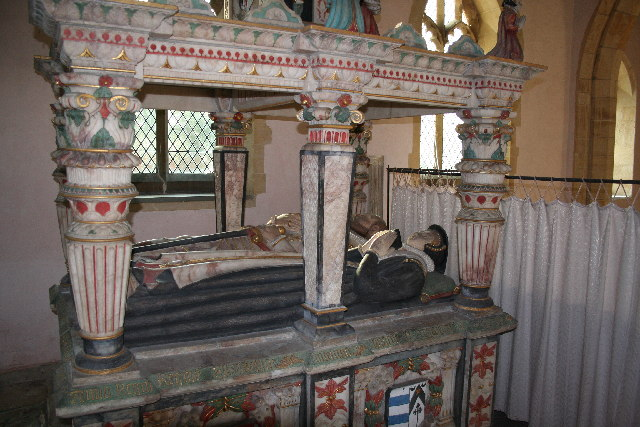
Sir Thomas St Paul and wife, Snarford

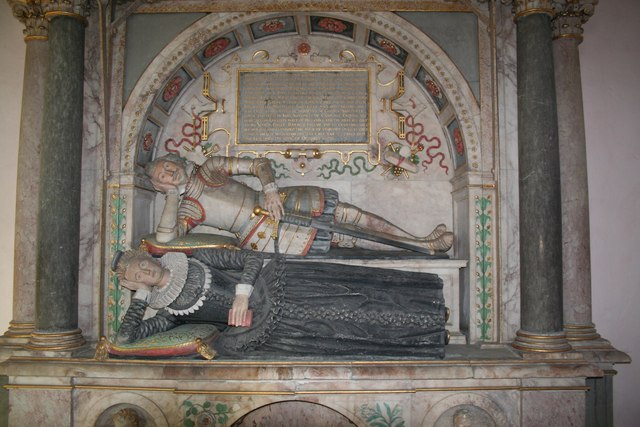
Sir George St Paul and his wife, Snarford

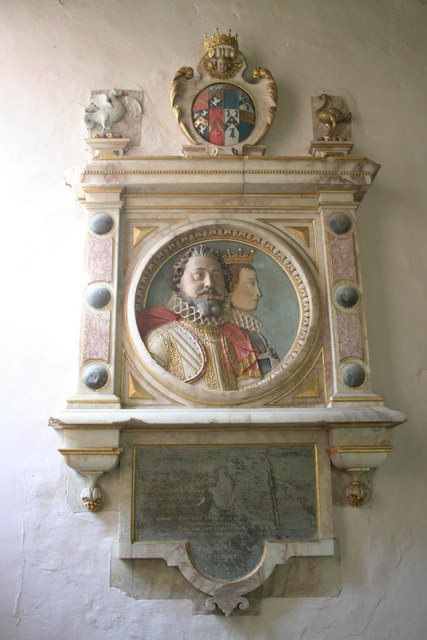
Monument to Robert Rich, Earl of Warwick

The most important monuments are in the chancel and the chapel. Behind the altar is the free-standing tomb chest of Sir Thomas St. Pol, who died in 1588, and his wife. On the sides of the chest are pilasters decorated with acanthus leaves, and the panels between them contain shields with wreaths. On top of the chest are effigies of a man and a woman. The man is dressed in plate armour and is holding a sword and a prayer book. His head rests on a helmet, his feet on a cushion. The woman is wearing a long dress, a cloak and a hat, and is holding a Bible. Above them is a canopy carried by six pillars. The entablature is decorated with an egg and dart frieze. On the top of the canopy, above each pillar, is the statue of a weeping figure. In the centre is an altar, in front of which is a kneeling female figure, and on the top is a male figure, also kneeling. The whole monument is painted and gilded. On the north side of the chapel is the tomb of Sir George St. Pol, who died in 1613, and his wife. On the side of the tomb are three niches. The central niche contains a carving of Sir George's daughter, and the lateral niches have mourning putti. On the tomb are two recumbent effigies, each lying on their right side, propped on an elbow. The nearer effigy is a female in mourning dress with a ruff and a hat, holding a prayer book. Behind in a higher position on a step is a male figure in plate armour, holding a sword. The effigies are contained in a semicircular-headed recess, the archivolt of which is decorated with roses. The back wall has an inscribed panel surrounded by scrolls and memento mori. At the sides are pillars supporting a frieze and an entablature. On top of the monument are flaming urns, an achievement of arms, shields and obelisks. In the north wall of the chapel is an alabaster painted and gilded plaque to Robert Rich, 1st Earl of Warwick who died in 1619. It contains a circular medallion carved with the head and shoulders of the deceased, behind which is the profile of his wife. On each side are pilasters, and above is an entablature carrying a coat of arms and heraldic supporters. Underneath is a panel inscribed with a poem. This memorial is thought to have been made by Epiphanius Evesham. Elsewhere, on the east wall of the chapel and the south wall of the chancel, are brass memorial plaques.

== See also ==
- List of churches preserved by the Churches Conservation Trust in the East of England
