= Snarford =

Village and civil parish in the West Lindsey district of Lincolnshire, England

Coordinates: 53.328665°N 0.424230°W

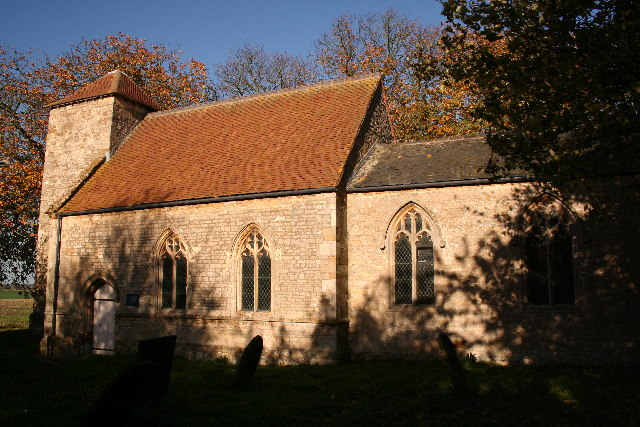
- Church of St Lawrence, Snarford

- Location within Lincolnshire
- OS grid reference: TF050824
  - London: 130 mi (210 km) S
- District: West Lindsey
- Shire county: Lincolnshire
- Region: East Midlands
- Country: England
- Sovereign state: United Kingdom
- Post town: Market Rasen
- Postcode district: LN8
- Police: Lincolnshire
- Fire: Lincolnshire
- Ambulance: East Midlands
- UK Parliament: Gainsborough

Snarford is a village and civil parish in the West Lindsey district of Lincolnshire, England. It is situated approximately 9 miles (14 km) north-east from the city and county town of Lincoln and 6 miles (10 km) south-west from the town of Market Rasen. It is in the civil parish of Friesthorpe.

Snarford is listed in the Domesday Book of 1086 as "Snardesforde", with 18 households.

== Parish church ==
The Grade I listed parish church is dedicated to Saint Lawrence and dates from the 12th century. It was altered and extended in the 13th and 14th centuries and restored in 1853. It contains a collection of monuments:

- Sir Thomas St Poll and his wife Faith Grantham
- Sir George St Paul and his wife Frances
- Robert Rich, 1st Earl of Warwick.

Snarford Hall, the seat of the St Paul family, no longer exists.

== Almshouses ==
The Hospital of Sir George St Paul is a registered charity of four almshouses for local "poor persons of good character" set up by Sir George St Paul.

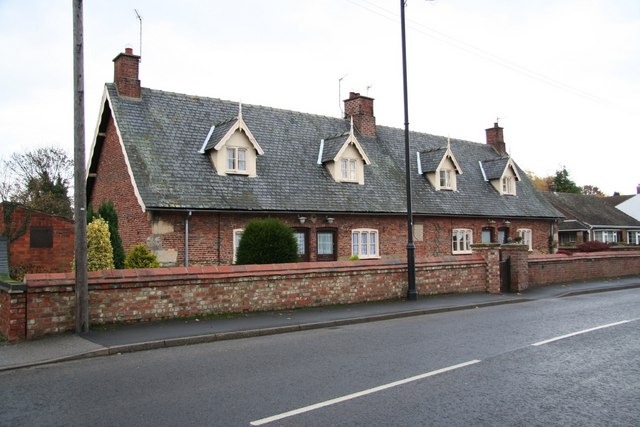
Hospital of Sir George St Paul, Snarford

The Manor House is a Grade II listed limestone farmhouse dating from the 17th century, with 19th-century alterations.
