= Caistor =

Town and civil parish in Lincolnshire, England

Coordinates: 53.494°N 0.322°W

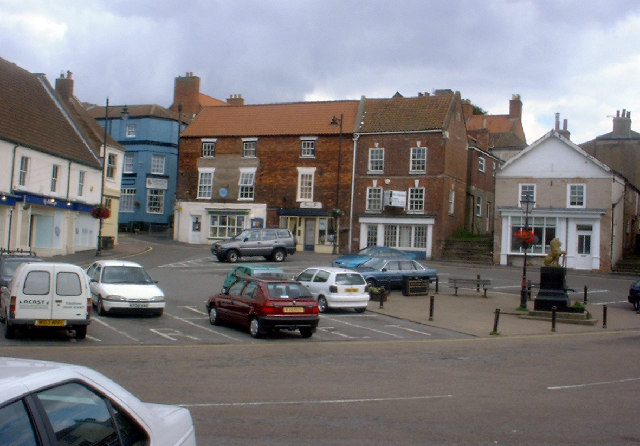
- Caistor Market Place

- Location within Lincolnshire
- Population: 3,095 (2021)
- OS grid reference: TA1101
  - London: 135 mi (217 km) S
- Civil parish: Caistor
- District: West Lindsey
- Shire county: Lincolnshire
- Region: East Midlands
- Country: England
- Sovereign state: United Kingdom
- Post town: MARKET RASEN
- Postcode district: LN7
- Dialling code: 01472
- Police: Lincolnshire
- Fire: Lincolnshire
- Ambulance: East Midlands
- UK Parliament: Gainsborough

Caistor is a town and civil parish in the West Lindsey district of Lincolnshire, England. As its name implies, it was originally a Roman castrum or fortress. It lies at the north-west edge of the Lincolnshire Wolds, on the Viking Way, and just off the A46 between Lincoln and Grimsby, at the A46, A1084, A1173 and B1225 junction. As of the 2021 Census, It has a population of 3,095. Its name comes from the Anglo-Saxon ceaster ("Roman camp" or "town") and was given in the Domesday Book of 1086 as Castre.

== Buildings ==
Only a few fragments of the 4th-century walls remain; for example, the original Roman wall is visible on the southern boundary of the parish church of St Peter and St Paul. The area occupied by the fortress is now classified as a scheduled monument. The church of St Peter and St Paul, which is enclosed within the fortress, has an Anglo-Saxon tower. The market square lies at the heart of a conservation area which contains 56, mainly Grade II, listed buildings. In numerical terms, the number of listed buildings makes Caistor the most important conservation area in the West Lindsey area; many of the buildings are Georgian or Victorian. Notable buildings in the town include Caistor Grammar School, founded in 1633, and Sessions House, built in 1662.

In 2010 the remains of a 4th-century Roman cemetery were found during the development of a new Co-op supermarket.

== Education ==
=== Grammar school ===
Caistor Grammar School dates from the reign of Charles I. An academy with a selective pupil intake, it has specialist school status for sports and humanities. Sir Henry Newbolt, author of Drake's Drum, was educated at the school.

=== Caistor Yarborough Academy School ===
Caistor Yarborough Academy is a mixed comprehensive school named in memory of John Edward Pelham, the 7th Earl of Yarborough. Being limited to 570 pupils it is much smaller than the average British school of this type. It has Arts College status under the English specialist schools programme. In 2012 the school became an Academy.

== RAF Caistor ==
Opened in 1940, RAF Caistor was built as a relief airfield for RAF Kirton in Lindsey, and also used for flying training from its grass runways. Closed in 1945, it later reopened as a nuclear missile base.

Between 1959 and 1963 Caistor was manned by 269(SM) Sqn. equipped with three Thor missiles. The site has now returned to agricultural use, and little remains of the military facilities.

== Transport ==
The nearest railway station is Barnetby railway station. The town was formerly served by the stations at both North Kelsey and Moortown. Both are now closed but the station buildings survive as private residences.

The town has bus services to Brigg, Grimsby, Market Rasen and Lincoln. Operated by Stagecoach East Midlands.

The town bypass, to the south-east, started construction in September 1937, costing £45,000, to take two and a half years.

Humberside Airport is also located a short distance to the north of the town.

== Media ==
Television signals are received from either the Emley Moor or Belmont TV transmitters.

Local radio stations are provided by BBC Radio Humberside, Hits Radio East Yorkshire & North Lincolnshire, Hits Radio Lincolnshire and Greatest Hits Radio East Yorkshire & Northern Lincolnshire.

The town is served by the local newspaper, Grimsby Telegraph.

== Audleby ==
Audleby is a hamlet just north of Fonaby. It is recorded in the Domesday Book with 33 households, which at the time constituted a significant settlement. Today it is listed as a deserted medieval village (DMV). Audleby House on Brigg Road is a Grade II listed building.

== Fonaby ==
Fonaby is a hamlet and deserted medieval village just north of Caistor, mentioned in the Domesday Book as having 18 households and three acres of meadow, and held by William I.

== Notable people ==
- Admiral Nigel Malim lived at Caistor.
- Gary Turner, sideshow performer and World Record holder, was born in Caistor.

== Local tradition ==
According to a local tradition, one of Jesus's 12 apostles, Simon the Zealot, came to England, where he is supposed to have been martyred somewhere in the vicinity of Caistor. He was reputedly crucified on the orders of a Roman procurator called Catus Decianus on 10 May AD61. (However, there are competing theories as to what became of Simon the Zealot.)
