= Langley School, Loddon =

Independent school in Norfolk, England

Langley School

Location
- Langley Park; Loddon, Norfolk, NR14 6BJ; United Kingdom; 52.5530°N 1.4674°E

Information
- Type: Independent day and boarding school
- Motto: Perseverando; Persevere and do well
- Established: 1910
- Founder: J G Chapman
- Department for Education URN: 121224 Tables
- Chair of Governors: David Standbridge (appt 2022)
- Headmaster: Simon Cooke
- Staff: 89 teaching, 65 support
- Gender: Co-educational
- Age: 10 to 18
- Enrollment: 520
- Capacity: 650
- Houses: Beauchamp, Crome, Mancroft, St Giles
- Colours
- Publication: The Icenian
- Former pupils: Icenians
- Website: http://www.langleyschool.co.uk/

Langley School is an HMC private co educational day, weekly, flexi and full boarding school situated near the market town of Loddon in South Norfolk, England. The current headmaster is Simon Cooke, who has been in post since 2024, and the school is a member of the Society of Heads. Termly fees are currently £6,750 for day pupils, £11,395 for weekly boarders and £13,365 for full boarders.

The school was founded in Norwich in 1910 as the Norwich High School for Boys and was given its present name in 1946 after moving to Langley during the Second World War.

== History ==
Langley Hall is a red-brick, Palladian‑style English country house, built in 1737 for Richard Berney on land originally belonging to Langley Abbey. In 1744 the estate was inherited by Sir William Beauchamp and remained in his family until the 20th century. The hall is set in grounds laid out by Capability Brown, with an extensive spread of daffodils, which are opened to the public on "Daffodil Day" each spring.

In 1910, the Education Committee of Norfolk County Council made the decision to amalgamate the middle schools in the city with the Municipal and Presbyterian schools, with all boys to attend a new City of Norwich School, which was to be built at Eaton. Jeremiah George Chapman was offered a post at the new school, but determined instead to found a school of his own, with boarding provision for those boys who could not travel to Norwich each day.

Having established his school as the Norwich High School for Boys at St. Giles, Chapman died in September 1936 and was replaced by John Jevons. Under Jevons, the school moved to Langley Hall at Langley Park, near Loddon, and changed its name. Jevons retired in 1965 and was replaced by C.D. Young. Young oversaw the introduction of co-education at Langley with the arrival of three girls in the sixth form in 1978.

Young's successor, James McArthur, saw the number of girls jump from 3 to 40; the school was fully co-educational by 1990. In his turn, McArthur's successor, James Malcolm, doubled the size of the school in his ten-year term of office. James Malcolm would be succeeded as headmaster by Dominic Findlay who joined the school in 2007 from Wymondham College. The current headmaster is John Perriss, announced to be leaving Langley at the close of the 2023–24 academic year after five years in the role in which he will be replaced by Simon Cooke.

== Curriculum ==
The school offers a broad and balanced curriculum; in addition to the core subjects of English (language and literature), mathematics and the sciences, subjects taught include humanities, media studies, modern languages (French, German and Spanish), social sciences and technology. There is also provision for RS, PSE, and PE and games throughout the school.

Pupils in the senior school study for GCSEs in years 10 and 11, and for 'A' levels in the lower and upper sixth forms.

Almost all senior pupils move to higher educational institutions after 'A' level.

== Sport ==
The principal sports are Rugby football and cricket for boys and hockey and netball for girls. Minor sports include association football, athletics basketball, equestrianism, golf, polo and skiing.

The school has several cricket, football and rugby pitches, and there is an AstroTurf hockey pitch. Langley operates a polo academy.

== Extra-curricular activities ==
Academic lessons end at 3.45pm each day, allowing students a short break before engaging in their chosen extra-curricular activities. The school offers a range of activities, including CCF, debating, DoE, history, kayaking, rock climbing, sailing, yoga and Young Enterprise. Many activities involve expert visiting staff.

The activities programme changes at the end of each term and, at the end of each year, students complete questionnaires with their opinions on current activities and offer suggestions for the future.

Music tuition is available on a variety of instruments, and pupils regularly play in concerts and cabarets. Drama is offered both as an academic subject and an extra curricular activity, with pupils mounting several productions during the year. The BBC newsreader and children's author, Zeb Soanes taught speech and drama at the school before joining the BBC.

== Boarding ==
The school accepts students aged 10 to 18 (Year 6 to Year 13). There are some weekly boarders who live relatively nearby, but the majority are full boarders, including a large number from overseas.

=== Accommodation ===
There is separate accommodation for boys and girls, with communal social facilities. The boys live in the main hall in rooms for up to six students, divided into individual units. Senior students have single and double study bedrooms.

The girls live in Salisbury House (the former stable block) which has mostly single and double rooms. Salisbury has its own common room and limited kitchen and laundry facilities.

=== Staffing ===
There are 13 resident teachers and matrons.

== Preparatory School ==
The prep school accepts children aged 2 to 13 (Nursery to Year 8). In 2009, it merged with adjacent Thorpe House School, which had provided girls-only education for 100 years.

In early May 2016, the governors of Langley School announced that the prep school would merge with Taverham Hall Preparatory School. The announcement was initially greeted with anger in some quarters and the Charity Commission sent inspectors to the school in July that year, citing "regulatory concerns". Langley's prep-school site, Thorpe House, was sold to developers and the merger was completed for the beginning of the Autumn term, 2016.

The new school's home is in Taverham Hall, a neo-Jacobean mansion built in 1858 and purchased from the Mickelthwait family by Rev'd Frank Glass in 1921. The estate extends to over 100 acres (40 ha), and includes a forest school and a swimming pool.

The curriculum in the prep school is broadly based on the National Curriculum, but includes Latin / Classical civilisation for all pupils, and French for some. All pupils study ICT and music. Almost all pupils progress from the prep school to the senior school.

== Notable alumni ==
Former pupils of the school are known as Icenians, and include:

=== Norwich High School for Boys ===
- Sir John Mills (left 1925); actor
- Allen Clarke (left 1928): educationalist; first headmaster of Holland Park School
- Frederic Jevons (left 1948): biochemist; Vice-chancellor of Deakin University

=== Langley School ===
- Christopher Borrett (left 1997): cricketer.
- Ben Pienaar (left 2002): professional rugby player

== See also ==
- Langley Preparatory School at Taverham Hall
