= Walter P. Starmer =

British artist

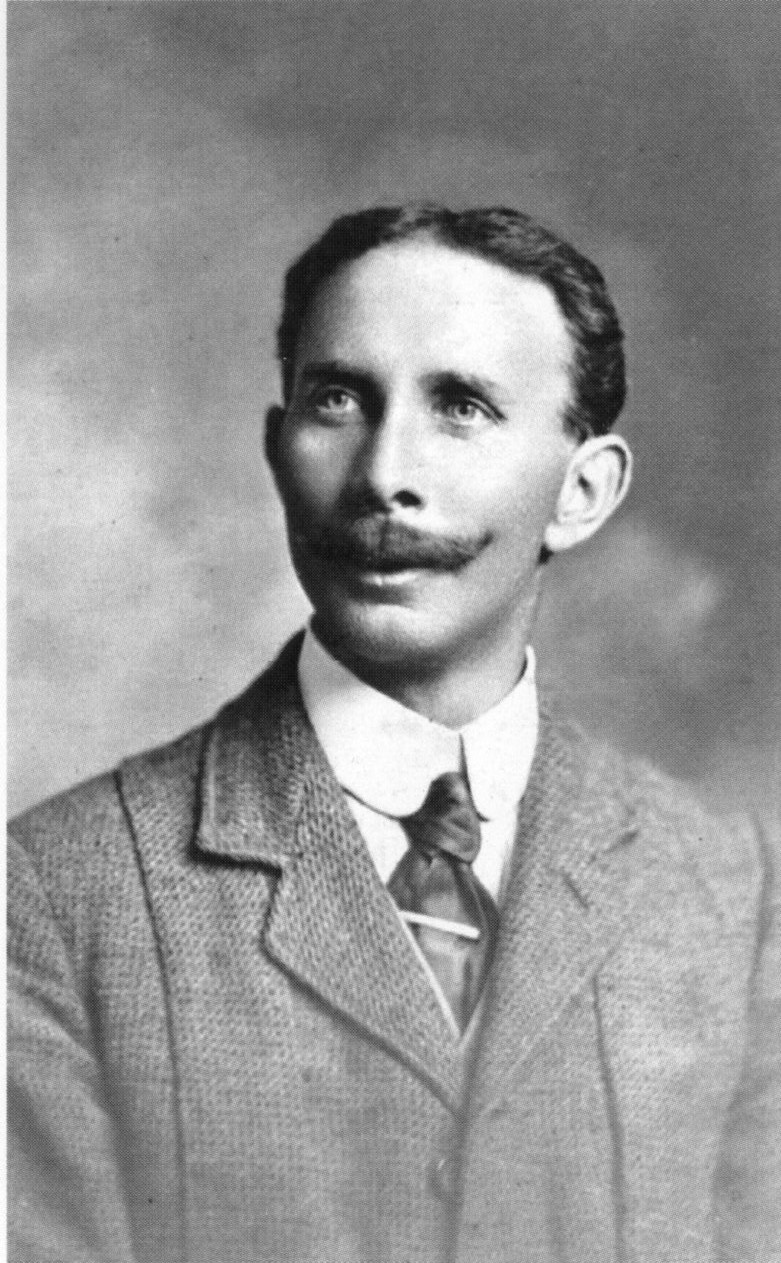
Walter P. Starmer, c.1919

Walter Percival Starmer (1877–1961) was an English artist, cartoonist, muralist, and stained glass designer.

The most extensive examples of his work are the murals at the church of St. Jude-on-the-Hill at Hampstead Garden Suburb and the stained glass windows at St. Aldhelm, Edmonton.

== Early life ==
Walter Percival Starmer was born in 1877 in Teignmouth, Devon where his father, Henry, was minister of the Congregational Church. In 1885 the family moved to Norwich for Henry to take up a position with the British and Foreign Bible Society. The family was associated with the Princes Street Congregational Church in Norwich.

Starmer attended the King Edward VI School (later Norwich High School for Boys and now Langley School, Loddon) and the Norwich School of Science and Art, where he won prizes in both local and national exams. In the summer of 1895 he won a scholarship for another three years at Norwich, but after just one year he transferred to the Art School in Birmingham, at the time the leading school in the country and a centre of the Arts and Crafts movement.

His first known commission was for one of a series of murals illustrating the history of the town for Birmingham Town Hall.

== Norfolk ==
By 1904 he was established at Breezemount, a large house in Mundesley-on-Sea on the Norfolk coast. He held exhibitions there, of his own work, and of other local artists, including his sister Edith who later came to live with him. He advertised Drawing and Painting lessons by post and became a member and later examiner for the Royal Drawing Society. His Christian faith remained important to him and in 1910 he became a ‘Paid Helper’ of the Bible Society.

By 1911 he had moved to a studio in Norwich. He was making a career as a children’s book illustrator, and as a cartoonist and caricaturist for newspapers and popular magazines. It was also around this time that he became active in the Norwich branch of the YMCA.

== First World War ==
From October 1914 until the summer of 1919 he served as a volunteer with the YMCA and the Red Cross on the Western Front in France and recorded what he saw in drawings and water colours. Eleven of his pictures were included in Sir Arthur Yapp’s ‘The Romance of the Red Triangle' - the story of the YMCA in the First World War. The YMCA possessed many more of his paintings which it later donated to the Imperial War Museum. The Museum also acquired others directly from the artist. The paintings are noteworthy for recording the presence of Indian troops and Chinese workers at the Front and the provision made for them by the YMCA.

== St. Jude-on-the-Hill. Hampstead Garden Suburb ==
In 1919 he was employed at St Jude’s Church, Hampstead Garden Suburb initially to decorate the Lady Chapel as a war memorial. The most notable part of the scheme is a series of depictions of women from Christian history up to the present including the anti-vivisectionist and suffragist Frances Power Cobbe (d. 1904), the social reformer and women’s right campaigner Josephine Butler (d.1906), Angela Burdett-Coutts (d.1906), philanthropist and supporter of animal causes, the executed nurse Edith Cavell (d. 1915), Elsie Inglis (d. 1917) a Scottish doctor and suffragist who had established all-women medical units, and Agnes Weston (d. 1918) who had dedicated her life to the welfare of the men of the Royal Navy. These were funded by a local women's committee which seems to have wanted to record the role of women in supporting the war effort as part of the campaign for equal suffrage. The committee was chaired by the suffragist Mabel St Clair Stobart (1862-1954) who resided in the parish.

In 1923 Starmer was commissioned to decorate the rest of the church with murals illustrating the life and teaching of Christ. This work was still in hand in 1933. Starmer designed the west window of the church as a memorial to the first vicar, Basil Bourchier. The design was exhibited at the Royal Academy in 1937 and praised in The Builder magazine.

His final commission for St Jude’s was for a memorial to Michael Rennie, elder son of the third vicar, the Reverend W. H. Maxwell Rennie, who had died of exposure after rescuing children from the sea after the evacuation ship on which he was an escort, the SS City of Benares, was torpedoed on 17th September 1940 with the tragic loss of around 260 lives. The Archbishop of Canterbury dedicated the mural, painted on canvas, on 18th October 1942.

== Other work ==
Stained glass windows by Starmer can also be found at:

- Bushey Methodist Church
- Chapel of St Mary and St Paul, University of Gloucestershire in Cheltenham
- St. Margaret’s, Edgware, Middlesex
- St. Aldhelm, Silver Street, Edmonton (where he also painted the high altar reredos)
- All Saints’ Church, Leavesden, Hertfordshire
- St. Mary the Virgin, Rickmansworth, Hertfordshire
- St. Mary, Shrawley, Worcestershire
- St. Mary and St. Nicolas, Spalding, Lincolnshire
- St. James the Great, Stonesfield, Oxfordshire (where he also designed iron gates and a grill)
- Wealdstone Methodist Church, Middlesex.

Paintings by Starmer are in the Imperial War Museum; the Anne S. K. Brown Military Collection (Brown University), Providence, Rhode Island, USA; Bushey Museum and Art Gallery, Bushey, Hertfordshire; and the Norfolk Record Office.

Starmer was a member of the Watford and Bushey Art Society, serving as Chairman in 1946, 1947 and 1955; President from 1952 to 1954; and Vice-President in 1958 and 1959.

Walker, Alan. (2015) Walter P. Starmer: Artist 1877-1961. ISBN 978-0956951816
