= Frederic Jevons =

British-Australian Professor of biochemistry and educator

Frederic Raphael Jevons
- Born: Frederic Raphael Bettelheim; 19 September 1929; Vienna, Austria
- Died: 30 September 2012 (aged 83); Melbourne, Australia
- Education: King's College, Cambridge
- Occupation: Biochemistry
- Employer: University of Melbourne
- Known for: Educationalist, first vice-chancellor of Deakin University
- Spouse: Grete ("Dita") Bradel
- Children: two sons
- Parent(s): Fritz and Hedwig Bettelheim

Frederic Raphael Jevons AO (born 19 September 1929 in Austria as Frederic Raphael Bettelheim, died 30 September 2012 in Melbourne) was a British Professor of biochemistry and later an Australian educator. He was informally known as Fred Jevons and since 1977 lived and worked mostly in Australia.

== Early life ==
Born in Austria in 1929, Jevons survived the Holocaust by being sponsored by a family in England to attend a boarding school in Norfolk. The young Bettelheim was educated at Norwich High School for Boys, joining the household of his school's headmaster, Mr J. H. W. Jevons, from whom he took his new surname. During the Second World War, the school moved from Norwich to Loddon and later changed its name to Langley School. His parents, Hedwig and Fritz Bettelheim, survived the war by escaping from Austria to Venezuela, but were separated from their children for some ten years. Jevons, as he was now known, was reunited with his parents in 1948.

Jevons matriculated at King's College, Cambridge, in 1946, where he held a scholarship and took a 1st class degree in the Natural Sciences Tripos in 1950. He graduated Doctor of Philosophy at Cambridge in 1953 and Doctor of Science at the University of Manchester in 1966.

== Career ==
Jevons was a Postdoctoral Fellow at the University of Washington, Seattle, 1953–1954, then a Fellow of King's College, Cambridge, 1953–1959. He was also University Demonstrator in Biochemistry at Cambridge, 1956–1959, before returning to Manchester University as Lecturer in Biological Chemistry 1959–1966, when he was appointed as the University's Professor of Liberal Studies in Science, holding that chair until 1975. He undertook British Council tours in India, East Africa, and Nigeria, between 1972 and 1975. In 1976, he went to Australia as the first Vice-Chancellor of Deakin University, and on his retirement in 1985 was appointed a Professor Emeritus. He was awarded Officer of the Order of Australia (AO) in the 1986 Queen's Birthday Honours.

From 1986 to 1987 Jevons was briefly a distance education consultant in southern Africa, before returning to Australia as Professor of Science and Technology Policy at Murdoch University, 1988–1992. In 1992 he went back to Manchester, as Simon Senior Research Fellow. From 1994 to 1996 he was an Honorary Professorial Fellow at Monash University, then joined the University of Melbourne as an Honorary Professorial Associate in the Department of History and Philosophy of Science.

== Other work ==
- Chairman, General Studies Committee, Schools Council, 1974–1975
- Chairman, Graduate Careers Council of Australia, 1976–1980
- Member, Joint Matriculation Board, Manchester, 1969–1975
- Member of Council, Science Museum of Victoria, 1980–1983
- Member of Council, Museum of Victoria, 1983–1987
- Member of Australian Vice-Chancellors’ Executive Committee, 1981–1982
- Member of Australian Science and Technology Council, 1986–1989
- Interviewer for Civil Service Commission on Final Selection Boards, 1970–75
- Adviser to Leverhulme project on educational objectives in applied science, Strathclyde University, 1972–1975
- Member of Editorial Advisory Board of Studies in Science Education, 1974–1984, and of Scientometrics, 1978 to date, and of Australasian Studies in History and Philosophy of Science, 1980–1986

== Selected publications ==
- The Biochemical Approach to Life, 1964 (and 2nd edition, 1968): translated into Italian, Spanish, Japanese, German
- The Teaching of Science: education, science and society, 1969
- University Perspectives, 1970 (joint ed.)
- Wealth from Knowledge: studies of innovation in industry, 1972
- What Kinds of Graduates do we Need?, 1972 (joint ed.)
- Science Observed: science as a social and intellectual activity, 1973
- Knowledge and Power, 1976

== Honours ==
- Officer of the Order of Australia (AO), 1986
- Hon. DLitt, Deakin University, 1986
- Hon. DSc, Manchester, 1986
- Life Governor, Geelong Hospital, 1986
- Inaugural winner, UNESCO Prize for Science and Technology Policy, 1992
- The Fred Jevons Building on Deakin University's Geelong Campus was named in honour of Jevons

== Private life ==
Jevons got married in 1956 to Grete and they had two sons one of which is Colin Jevons.
