= William Beauchamp-Proctor =

William Beauchamp-Proctor may refer to:

- Sir William Beauchamp-Proctor, 1st Baronet (1722–1773)
- Sir William Beauchamp-Proctor, 3rd Baronet (1781–1861)
