= Bertram Pockney =

English academic

Bertram Patrick Pockney (17 March 1927 – 22 June 2004) was a Russian studies academic with an interest in Soviet economics. He graduated from the London School of Economics in 1947. He then taught at Holland Park School while also later lecturing on Soviet economics at Battersea College of Advanced Technology. In the meantime, he completed a BA at the University of London (1960). He was appointed to a lectureship at the University of Surrey in 1965. In 1970, he was promoted to a senior lectureship in Russian studies. He was later appointed to a professorship, delivering his inaugural lecture in 1984. He retired in 1992 and worked as a consultant on industry in Russia and Eastern Europe. In 1991, he authored Soviet Statistics since 1950.
