= David Levin (businessman) =

British businessman (born 1963)

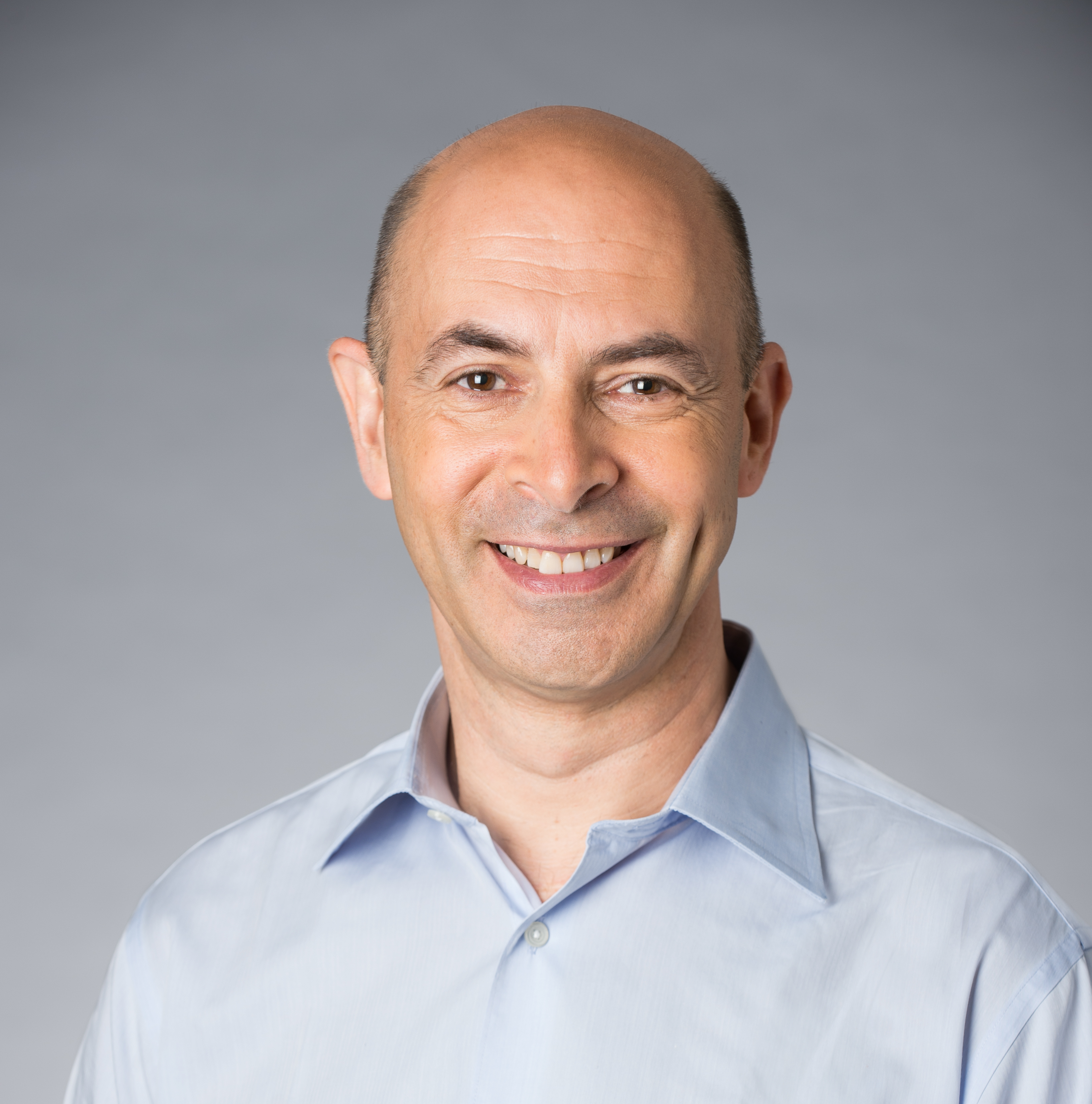
- Born: 1963 (age 62–63); Harare, Zimbabwe
- Education: Wadham College, Oxford
- Occupation: Businessman
- Employer(s): Apax Partners; Psion; Symbian Ltd. UBM plc McGraw-Hill Education; Arizona State University
- Mother: Leah Levin

David Levin (born 1963) is a British businessman. In 2019, he was named university entrepreneur in residence at Arizona State University and is the creator and Executive Producer of REMOTE: The Connected Faculty Summit.

He served as the president and CEO of McGraw-Hill Education from 2014 to 2017. He has been a vocal proponent of the use of digital and adaptive learning technology in education.

== Early life and education ==
Levin was born in Harare, Zimbabwe. His father Archie (died 1977) was a political journalist. His mother, Leah Levin OBE, was Hon. Doctor of the University of Essex. She served on the board of the United Nations Association, Anti-Slavery and International Alert, and was director of JUSTICE from 1982 to 1992. Ms. Levin also served on Boards of Redress, Readers International, and the International Journal of Human Rights. She is the author of UNESCO's "Human Rights: Questions and Answers," one the world's widely disseminated books on human rights. His older siblings are brother Jeremy and sister Michal Levin.

Before he was born, his family left South Africa following the Sharpeville massacre, and moved to Salisbury, Rhodesia (now Harare). In 1965, his father was given one day to leave the country. The family arrived in Britain without any connections and settled in London. He attended St Paul's School in London. Levin has a degree in Philosophy, Politics and Economics from Oxford University (1983), and an MBA from Stanford University (1984).

== Career ==
In 2005, Levin succeeded Clive Hollick as the CEO of UBM plc. During his tenure, UBM secured its position as one of the world's largest events businesses. On 16 September 2013, UBM announced Levin's resignation as chief executive officer.

He served as the former head of Symbian Ltd. He also held senior positions at Psion, Apax Partners.

As Executive Producer of REMOTE: The Connected Faculty Summit he created a first of its kind, free virtual event to help higher education faculty and administrators design effective and engaging online and blended learning experiences. REMOTE began as an immediate response to the COVID crisis spring of 2020. Designed as a straightforward way to equip faculty with the best tools and tips of remote and hybrid teaching, its goal was to support them as they began in-class work with students in the fall of 2020. Almost 50,000 faculty and administration registered to join in 2020. In 2021 the event returned and David organized leaders from global universities and colleges to continue in support of adapting to a blended learning environment and spoke with ASU President, Michael M. Crow on the future of higher education. In June of 2022, REMOTE will be in its third iteration, with a focus on maximizing success for learners.

== Personal life ==
Levin is married to Lindsay Levin. David and Lindsay have three sons.
