= Admiral Beauchamp =

Admiral Beauchamp may refer to:

- John Beauchamp, 1st Baron Beauchamp of Warwick (c. 1316–1360), English Admiral of the Fleet
- Thomas Beauchamp, 12th Earl of Warwick (1338–1401), English Admiral of the North
- Sir William Beauchamp-Proctor, 3rd Baronet (1781–1861), British Royal Navy admiral
