= Portrait of Sir Thomas Beauchamp-Proctor =

Painting by Benjamin West

- Artist: Benjamin West
- Year: 1777
- Type: Oil on canvas, portrait painting
- Dimensions: 126.4 cm × 103 cm (49.8 in × 41 in)
- Location: Tate Britain, London

Portrait of Sir Thomas Beauchamp-Proctor is a 1777 portrait painting by the Anglo-American artist Benjamin West. It depicts the English landowner Sir Thomas Beauchamp-Proctor, one of the Proctor-Beauchamp baronets. He was the owner of Langley Hall in Norfolk, having succeeded his father in 1773. He had recently returned from a Grand Tour to Italy and the painting acknowledges this with the Neoclassical column beside him. Aged twenty one, he is shown in the Grand manner "sprezzatura" style, leaning nonchalantly on a cane. The following year West also produced a companion piece featuring his wife Mary to commemorate their marriage.

Although West was best known for his ambitious history paintings which earned him the patronage of George III and led to his election as President of the Royal Academy, he was also a noted portraitist. The painting is today in the collection of the Tate Britain, having been presented through the Art Fund in 1941.

== Bibliography ==
- Alberts, Robert C. Benjamin West: A Biography. Houghton Mifflin, 1978.
- Prown, Jules David. John Singleton Copley: In England, 1774–1815. National Gallery of Art, Washington, 1966.
