= Jeremy Levin =

American businessman

- ג'רמי לוין
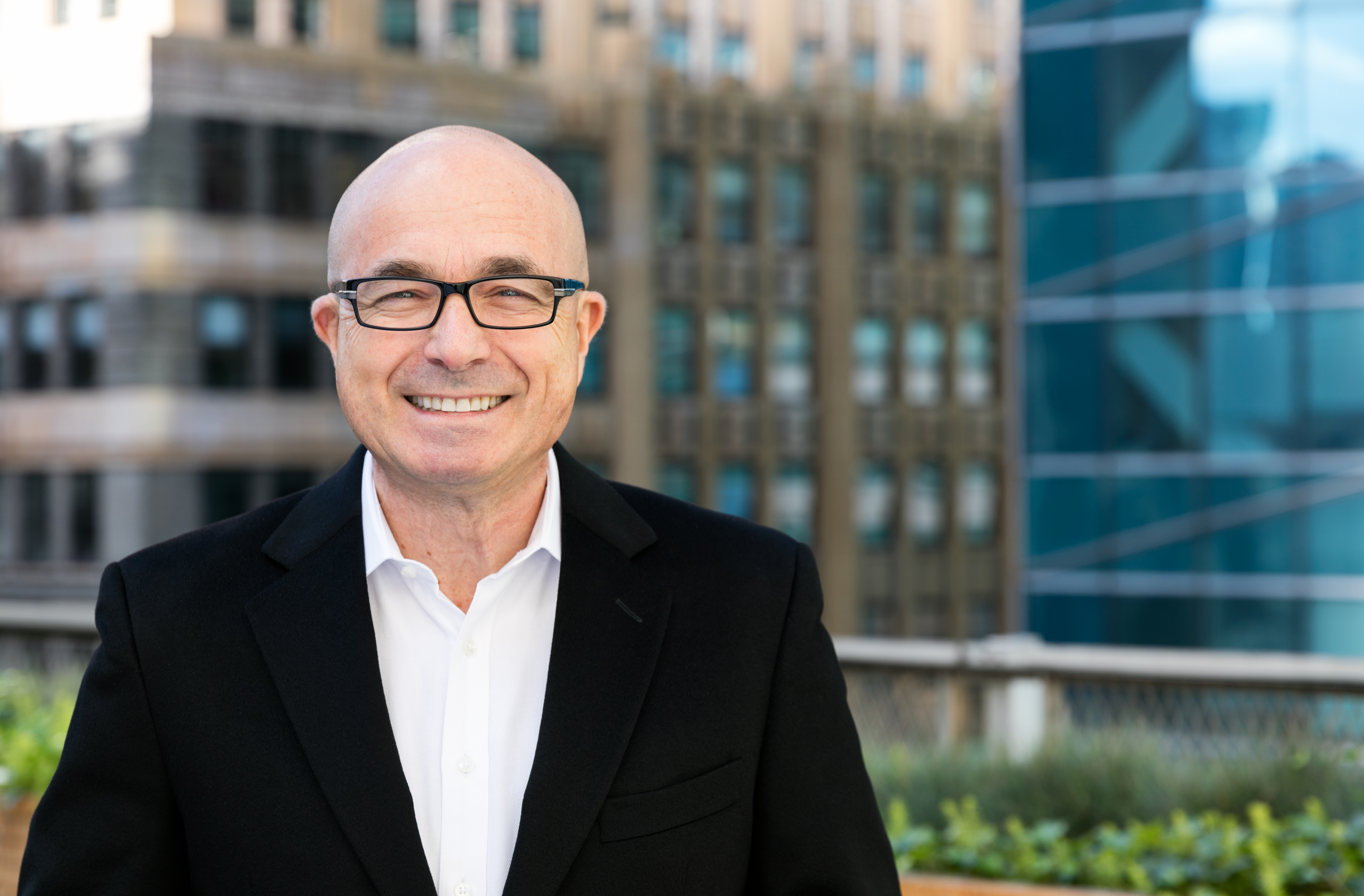
- Born: 1954 (age 71–72); South Africa
- Education: Oxford University, Cambridge University
- Occupations: Chairman and CEO, Ovid Therapeutics Inc
- Spouse: Margery Feldberg (m. 1987)
- Children: 2
- Parent: Leah Levin

Jeremy Levin (Hebrew: ג'רמי לוין; born 1954) is a South African-born biopharmaceutical executive and medical doctor. In 2018, one publication put him among the most influential figures in the biopharmaceutical industry; in 2023, he received the Lifetime Achievement Award at the 19th Annual Scrip Awards in London.

== Biography ==
Jeremy Levin was born in South Africa, where his family had a farm, De Hoek Farm, in Piketberg, Western Cape. His father Archie (died 1977) was a political journalist. His mother, Leah Levin (died 2024), was an honorary doctorate from the University of Essex and was appointed OBE for services to international human rights in 2001. She served on the board of the United Nations Association, Anti-Slavery and International Alert, and was director of JUSTICE from 1982 to 1992. Ms. Levin also served on Boards of Redress, Readers International, and the International Journal of Human Rights. She is the author of UNESCO's Human Rights: Questions and Answers, one the world's widely disseminated books on human rights. He is the brother of David and sister Michal Levin.

After the Sharpeville massacre, Levin's family left South Africa and moved to Salisbury, Rhodesia (now Harare, Zimbabwe). In 1965, his father was given a day to leave the country. The family arrived in Britain knowing nobody, settling in London. Levin attended Holland Park School, then matriculated at Wadham College, University of Oxford, where he gained a First Class BA Honors degree in zoology, and a Master of Arts (MA) and doctorate (DPhil) in cell biology and chromatin structure from the Oxford University's Sir William Dunn School of Pathology. He subsequently received an MB, BChir degree (Bachelor of Medicine, Bachelor of Surgery) from the University of Cambridge.

Before entering business, Levin practised medicine at university teaching hospitals including Addenbrooke's Hospital in Cambridge, England, Hammersmith Hospital in London, Groote Schuur Hospital in Cape Town, South Africa, and Hôpitaux universitaires de Genève in Geneva, Switzerland.

In 1986, Levin came to America, where he has worked in the biopharmaceutical industry. While living in Washington, D.C., Levin met Margery Feldberg, daughter of Stanley Feldberg, co-founder of TJX Companies. They married in September 1987 and have two daughters. He has lived in New Milford, Connecticut, since the 1980s, where he and his wife own De Hoek Farm and raise Black Angus cows.

== Business career ==
Levin is co-founder and Executive Chairman of Ovid Therapeutics, a biotechnology company developing small molecule medicines for brain disorders with significant unmet medical need. Ovid is advancing a pipeline of targeted small molecule candidates designed to modulate neuronal hyperexcitability associated with neurological and neuropsychiatric disorders. Its programs include OV329, a next-generation GABA-aminotransferase inhibitor being developed for treatment-resistant seizures, and a portfolio of direct KCC2 activators including OV350 and OV4071 for multiple central nervous system disorders.

Before joining Ovid, Levin served as president and CEO of Israel's Teva Pharmaceutical Industries Ltd. (NYSE:TEVA), one of the world's largest pharmaceutical companies. Previously, he was a member of the executive committee of Bristol-Myers Squibb (NYSE:BMY), where he had global responsibilities for strategy, alliances and transactions. In this role, he devised and led BMY's “String of Pearls” business development strategy. Levin acquired Medarex Inc. in July 2009, turning BMY into a leader in immunooncology. Prior to this, Levin was head of global business development and strategic alliances at Novartis (NYSE: NVS), and previously served as chairman and CEO of Cadus Pharmaceuticals, Inc.

Levin serves as Chairman of the Board of Ceryvyn Therapeutics and is a member of the board of directors of Gensaic. He previously served on the board of directors of Graviton Bioscience. Levin served as Chairman of the Board of the Biotechnology Innovation Organization (BIO) from 2019 to 2021 and subsequently became Chairman Emeritus.

Levin frequently speaks at biopharmaceutical conferences about companies' relationships with patients, innovation in the biopharmaceutical industry, expanding mergers and acquisitions, globalising the biopharmaceutical industry, and propelling interface of the digital health and biopharmaceutical industries and leaders. In a 2018 speech at the Kellogg-Recanati International Executive MBA Program in Tel Aviv, Levin described how emerging leaders in shape the future of healthcare and technology. At the Keck Graduate Institute’s (KGI) 25 Years of Innovation Speaker Series, he discussed “the Innovation Symphony” and values that are crucial for the future of biomedical innovation.

Levin wrote the first book on the biotechnology industry's response to the COVID-19 pandemic, Biotechnology in the Time of Covid-19: Commentaries from the Front Line. The book includes commentaries from biotechnology industry leaders about their experiences during the pandemic and the role of biotechnology in responding to global health crises.

In 2026, Levin published Biotech in the Balance: Saving a Strategic Industry in an Age of Distrust, a book examining the scientific, financial, regulatory, and societal challenges facing the biotechnology industry.

== Social and political activism ==
Levin has written and spoken publicly on issues relating to democracy, innovation policy, Israel, and geopolitical affairs. In opinion articles and public commentary, he has expressed support for democratic institutions in Israel and the United States and has warned about the societal and economic consequences of democratic erosion and political polarization. Levin has also publicly criticized Russia's invasion of Ukraine and has spoken against Hamas following the October 2023 attacks on Israel.

Levin has been an advocate for women's rights, particularly in the healthcare sector. He was involved in the legal battle surrounding mifepristone, a medication used in medical abortions, when the case reached the U.S. Supreme Court.

== Awards and recognition ==
In 2012, FierceBiotech called him one of the most influential people in biopharma.

Levin has received awards, including:

- The Kermode Prize for work on novel hypertension drugs
- The Albert Einstein Award for Leadership in Life Sciences
- The B'nai B'rith Award for Distinguished Achievement for commitment to improving global health care
- The Officer's Cross of the Order of Merit of the Republic of Hungary
- Scrip's Lifetime Achievement Award
- PharmaVoice Red Jacket and Legacy Leader
