= HMS Saracen (1804) =

Brig-sloop of the Royal Navy

History

United Kingdom
- Name: HMS Saracen
- Namesake: Saracen
- Builder: Perry, Green & Wells, Blackwall Yard
- Launched: 1804
- Commissioned: August 1804
- Fate: Broken up, May 1812

General characteristics
- Class & type: Cruizer-class brig-sloop
- Tons burthen: 3855/94 bm
- Length: 100 ft 2 in (30.53 m) (gundeck); 77 ft 6 in (23.62 m) (keel)
- Beam: 30 ft 6 3/4 in (9.315 m)
- Draught: Unladen:5 ft 6 in (1.68 m); Laden:12 ft 9 in (3.89 m)
- Depth of hold: 12 ft 9 in (3.89 m)
- Sail plan: Brig
- Complement: 121
- Armament: 16 × 32-pounder carronades + 2 × 6-pounder bow guns

HMS Saracen was a Royal Navy Cruizer-class brig-sloop built by Perry, Green & Wells at Blackwall Yard and launched in 1804. She had a relatively short and uneventful career before she was broken up at Chatham in 1812.

== Service ==
Saracen was commissioned in August 1804 under Commander William Proctor for the Irish station. In February 1805 Commander James Prevost took command and by May 1805 she was cruising the Channel.

By 3 January 1806 she was with Sir John Borlase Warren's squadron at Saint Helena. Nine days later she sailed to Madeira to gain intelligence of Vice Admiral Leissègues's squadron. By 28 December she was back at Falmouth.

During the summer of 1807 Saracen was in the Rio Plata with Sir Home Popham's forces. From there she brought home the naval and military dispatches after the surrender of the British forces by General Whitelocke on 5 July.

She sailed for the Mediterranean on 15 November and in 1808 was off Cadiz. Saracen brought back to Great Britain a copy of the treaty for the peace of the Dardanelles signed on 6 January 1809 with the Ottoman Empire.

On 13 March 1809, Commander Buckland Stirling Bluett took command. (He had received his promotion to Commander in 1804 when as a lieutenant in Saracen's sister ship, Scorpion, he had participated in the boat action under her captain, Commander George Nicholas Hardinge, that captured the Dutch brig Atalante.) On 10 May Bluett sailed Saracen for Jamaica.

On 12 October 1810 Saracen took her one prize when she captured the French privateer Caroline off Cuba. Caroline had one gun, a crew of 42 men, and had not made any captures.

== Fate ==
Saracen was broken up at Chatham in May 1812. On 14 July Bluett took command of a sister ship, Childers, then lying at Portsmouth.
