= Ben Pienaar =

South African rugby union player

- Born: Benjamin Pienaar; 10 September 1986 (age 40) Virginia, Free State, South Africa
- Height: 1.93 m (6 ft 4 in)
- Weight: 100 kg (15 st 10 lb)
- School: Gresham's, Langley School, Loddon

Rugby union career
- Position: Back Row Forward
Amateur team(s)
Years	Team	Apps	(Points)
- Norfolk, England Schools
Senior career
Years	Team	Apps	(Points)
2006–2012	Leicester Tigers		
2012–2013	Moseley		
2013–	London Welsh		

Ben Pienaar (born 10 September 1986) is a rugby union player for London Welsh in the Aviva Premiership, having formerly played for Leicester Tigers in the Aviva Premiership.

Born in South Africa, Pienaar previously played for Langley School, Loddon before moving to Gresham's School and for England Schools,

He represented Norfolk from U-14s to U-16s, then was capped by England at U-16 and U-19 level.

Outside rugby, Pienaar is also a past Junior National Champion at judo.

Following injury and suspension of the more established number eights at Tigers, Pienaar had an opportunity for a run in the first team earning the praise of the coaches in the process. Pienaar was added to Tigers Heineken Cup squad for the knock-out stages of the 2008–09 competition.
