= Sophia Wintz =

Swiss-born British philanthropist

Dame Sophia Wintz DBE
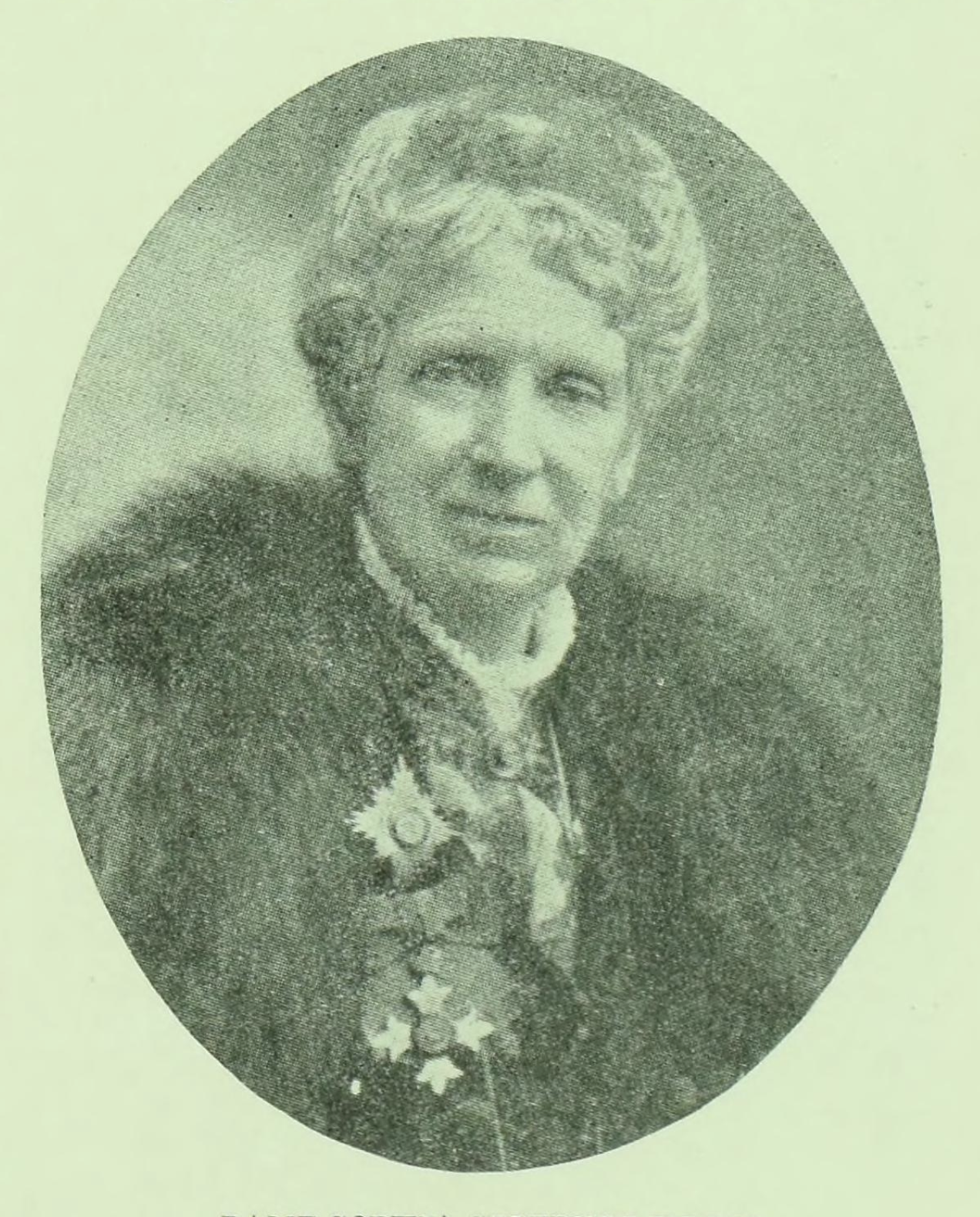

Co-founder and Superintendent of the Royal Sailors' Rests
- In office 1876 – 16 January 1929

Personal details
- Born: Sophia Gertrude Wintz; 1847 Schaffhausen, Switzerland
- Died: 16 January 1929 (aged 81–82) England

Dame Sophia Gertrude Wintz DBE (1847–16 January 1929) was a Swiss-born British philanthropist who co-founded the Royal Sailors' Rests in Plymouth and Portsmouth. She was also a temperance activist.

Sophia Wintz was born in Schaffhausen, Switzerland. Her father died when she was a child and her mother brought her to England. Her younger brother, Lewis Wintz, joined the Royal Navy and rose to the rank of vice-admiral. She was educated in a school near Fareham, Hampshire. While staying at Bath she met Agnes Weston, who lived there, and the two became close friends and remained so for the rest of their lives. In the 1870s they began to hold Sunday afternoon meetings at Wintz's mother's house for boys from the training ships at Devonport.

These meetings grew into a major movement in both Plymouth and Portsmouth and the two women later bought a public house in each city, demolished them and replaced them with the two Sailors' Rests to serve as homes for sailors of all nationalities on shore leave. The establishment in Plymouth opened in 1876 and that in Portsmouth in 1881. They also founded the Royal Naval Temperance Society and established journals, Monthly Letters and Ashore and Afloat, and a library for sailors which distributed literature to ships all over the world.

Weston died in 1918, but Wintz continued to serve as superintendent of the homes until her own death in 1929. She was appointed Dame Commander of the Order of the British Empire (DBE) in the 1920 civilian war honours. She was given a full naval funeral at Devonport Dockyard Church attended by four hundred officers and ratings of the Royal Navy and was buried next to Weston.

== Sources ==
- Obituary, The Times, 17 January 1929
- Plymouth Museums Galleries Archives: Dame Sophia Wintz
- Aggie Weston's - Our History
