= Montagu Proctor-Beauchamp =

Sir Montagu Proctor-Beauchamp
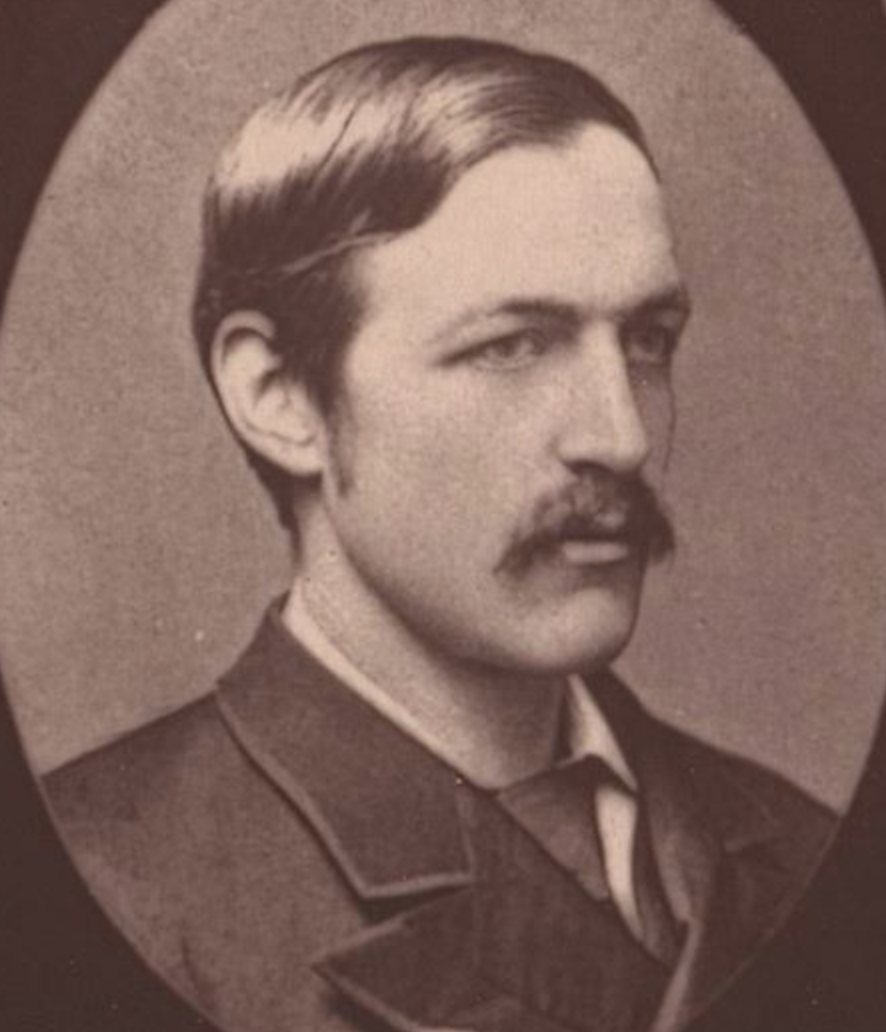
- Montagu Proctor-Beauchamp in 1886
- Born: Montagu Harry Proctor-Beauchamp; 19 April 1860
- Died: 26 October 1939 (aged 79); Langzhong, Sichuan, Republican China
- Burial place: St John's Cathedral, Langzhong
- Education: Repton School; Trinity College, Cambridge
- Occupation: Missionary
- Spouse: Florence Beauchamp (née Barclay)
Montagu Harry Proctor-Beauchamp, 7th Baronet
- Baronet Beauchamp-Proctor
- Predecessor: Horace George Proctor-Beauchamp, 6th Baronet
- Successor: Ivor Cuthbert Proctor-Beauchamp, 8th Baronet
- Father: Thomas William Brograve Proctor-Beauchamp, 4th Baronet
- Mother: Hon Catherine Esther Waldegrave

Sir Montagu Harry Proctor-Beauchamp, 7th Baronet (19 April 1860 – 26 October 1939) was a British Anglican Christian missionary.

== Biography ==
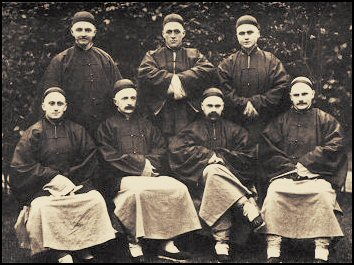
The Cambridge Seven in Qing-dynasty mandarin clothing

Proctor-Beauchamp was the fourth son of Sir Thomas William Brograve Proctor-Beauchamp, 4th Baronet, and his wife the Hon. Catherine Esther, daughter of Granville Waldegrave, 2nd Baron Radstock. He was educated at Repton and Trinity College, Cambridge. Proctor-Beauchamp was one of the Cambridge Seven, students from Cambridge University, who in 1885 decided to become missionaries in China. He served with the China Inland Mission during the late Qing dynasty in western China (Sichuan, formerly spelt Szechwan). Together with Arthur T. Polhill-Turner and William Cassels, the three established a proper Church of England diocese in Szechwan. He was evacuated from China during the Boxer Rebellion in 1900, but was back in China again from 1902 to 1911.

On returning to England Beauchamp was ordained, becoming Vicar of Monkton Combe, Somerset between 1914 and 1918. He was Principal Chaplain of the Mediterranean Expeditionary Force in World War I, serving in Egypt and Greece, and he was mentioned in dispatches in 1916. He was senior chaplain Chaplain to the Forces of the North Russian Expeditionary Force in Murmansk in northern Russia in 1919, and appointed Honorary Chaplain to the Forces in 1921.

Proctor-Beauchamp married Florence, daughter of Robert Barclay, in 1892. They had several children. He succeeded in the Proctor-Beauchamp baronetcy in 1915 when his elder brother Horace was killed in the First World War. He died in Langzhong in October 1939, aged 79, buried in the cemetery of St John's Cathedral, Langzhong. He was succeeded in his title by his third but eldest surviving son, Ivor. Lady Proctor-Beauchamp died in May 1955.

== See also ==
- Anglicanism in Sichuan

== Notes ==
Baronetage of Great Britain
Preceded by Horace Proctor-Beauchamp	Baronet (of Langley Park); 1915–1939	Succeeded by Ivor Proctor-Beauchamp
