= Suneet Chopra =

Indian politician and trade unionist (1941–2023)

Suneet Chopra (24 December 1941 – 4 April 2023) was an Indian communist politician and trade unionist. He was the All-India joint secretary of the All India Agricultural Workers Union. He was a Central Committee member of the Communist Party of India (Marxist).

Earlier he was on the Central Committee of the Students Federation of India and a founding member of the SFI in Jawaharlal Nehru University New Delhi. Later in 1980 he was the founding All-India treasurer of the Democratic Youth Federation of India and became vice president in 1984. Chopra was born on 24 December 1941 in Lahore. He was also an art critic, writer, and poet. He was an alumnus of Modern School and St. Columba's School, Delhi, and St. Xavier's College, Calcutta. He taught science at Holland Park School. He taught African studies at the School of Oriental and African Studies, University of London and later regional development at Jawaharlal Nehru University in New Delhi. He supported communism in India. Chopra died in New Delhi on 4 April 2023, at age 81.
