= Kasete Naufahu Skeen =

Tongan alpine skier

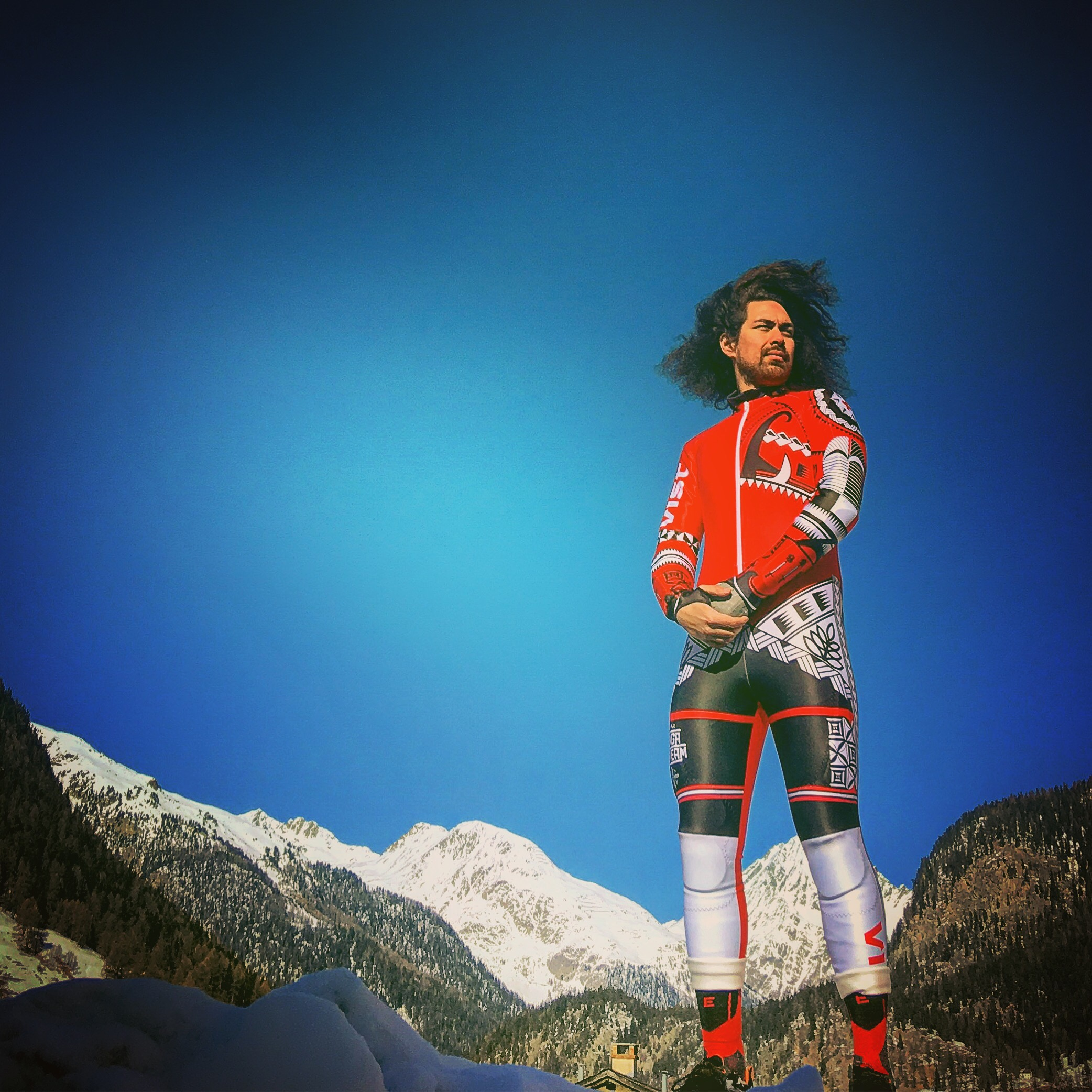

Personal information
- Born: 10 September 1982 (age 44) London, United Kingdom
- Height: 1.93 m (6 ft 4 in)

Skiing career
- Sport: Alpine skiing
- Disciplines: Giant slalom

World Championships
- Teams: 1 – (2017)

Kasete Naufahu Skeen (born 10 September 1982) is the first Tongan alpine skier to compete at the FIS Alpine World Ski Championships.

Skeen was born in London to an English mother and Tongan father. He grew up in Notting Hill attending Holland Park School.

Skeen competed in the giant slalom qualification race at the FIS Alpine World Ski Championships 2017 held at St Moritz, Switzerland. Whilst training in Val di Fiemme, Italy, Skeen was given the nickname "Il Tomba di Tonga" (The Tomba of Tonga) referring to the Italian alpine ski racer Alberto Tomba.

Skeen is also a musician, composing and performing on Nero's albums Welcome Reality and Into the Unknown and with his own band Ilaheva.
