= Andien de Clermont =

French painter

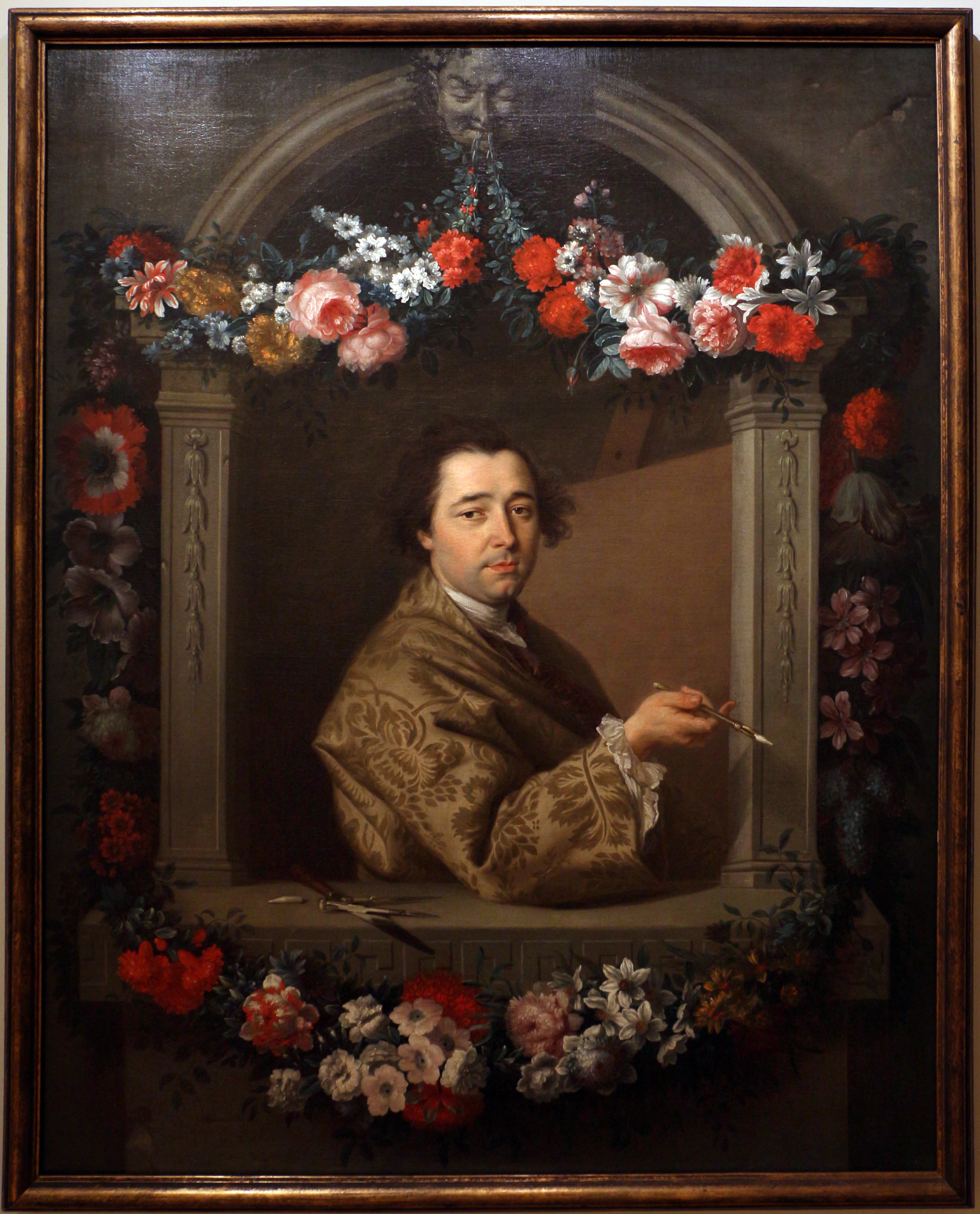
Self portrait, 1755

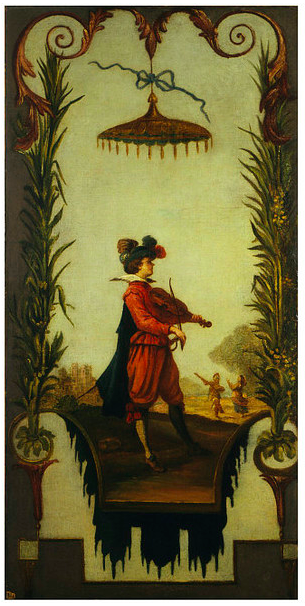
"Young Man Playing the Violin," oil painting by Clermont, 1742 (Victoria and Albert Museum)

Andien de Clermont (died 1783) was a French artist who worked in England in the 18th century (c.1716–1756). He was particularly known for his decorative flower paintings in the Rococo style, and for "singeries, chinoiseries, and turqueries." He decorated interiors at Kirtlington Park, Langley Hall, Wentworth Castle, Wilton House, and "the second earl of Strafford's (now destroyed) dining room at No. 5 St. James's Square, London."
