= Rob Newton (cricketer) =

English cricketer

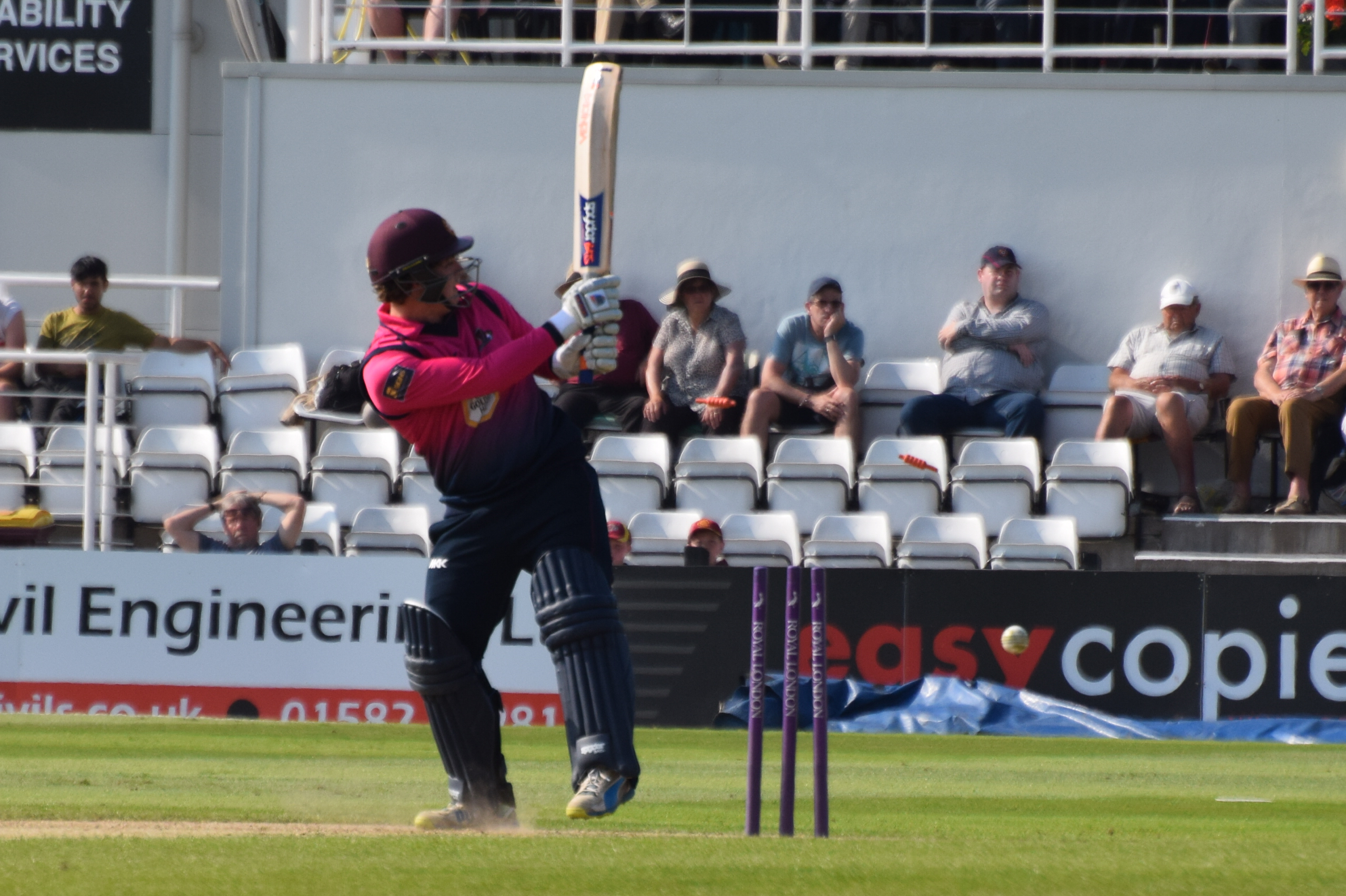

Personal information
- Full name: Robert Irving Newton
- Born: 18 January 1990 (age 36); Taunton, England
- Batting: Right-handed
- Bowling: Right-arm leg break
- Role: Batsman

Domestic team information
- Years: Team
- 2009–2020: Northamptonshire (squad no. 10)
- FC debut: 29 July 2010 Northamptonshire v Worcestershire
- LA debut: 19 September 2009 Northamptonshire v Middlesex

Career statistics
Competition	FC	LA	T20
Matches	98	45	21
Runs scored	5,675	1,148	214
Batting average	35.69	29.43	12.58
100s/50s	15/24	1/6	0/0
Top score	202*	107	38
Balls bowled	73	–	–
Wickets	1	–	–
Bowling average	107.00	–	–
5 wickets in innings	0	–	–
10 wickets in match	0	–	–
Best bowling	1/82	–	–
Catches/stumpings	28/–	8/–	0/–
- Source: ESPNcricinfo, 30 September 2019

Robert Irving Newton (born 18 January 1990) is an English cricketer who played for Northamptonshire County Cricket Club. He is an aggressive right-handed top order batsman. Newton enjoyed a prolific cricket record while at school and was tipped by The Wisden Cricketer as 'one to watch'. He made his Northamptonshire first-team debut in 2009.

== Early life ==
Although born in Taunton, he moved from Somerset at an early age to Norfolk. He first recalled playing cricket in the back garden aged four or five. From there he attend Taverham Hall School before boarding at Framlingham College in Suffolk. He made his senior club cricket debut for Swardeston in the 2003 season, aged just 13, scoring five runs. After an impressive schools career which included averaging 94.70 as a 15-year-old at Framlingham and also a double century against the MCC, he was awarded a place on the Northants Academy in 2005. From there he regularly played for Northamptonshire under-17's and then from the age of 19, the second XI. Also during this period, he played for England under-17s and captained Marylebone Cricket Club (MCC) under-18s.

== Career ==
Newton made his one-day debut for Northamptonshire aged 19 in September 2009 against Middlesex scoring seven. In 2010 people began to take note of his ability after an impressive performance in scoring his maiden one-day fifty against Essex and decent scores in his debut first-class game against Worcestershire when a lot of others around him failed. He scored his first first-class century against Leicestershire in the final game of the 2010 season.

In August 2012 he achieved the feat of scoring a century in each innings against Derbyshire. His highest first-class score to date came in August 2016, with 202 not out against Leicestershire.

In May 2017, he scored his first century in List A cricket, when he made 107 for Northamptonshire against Worcestershire in the 2017 Royal London One-Day Cup.
