= Leah Levin =

Lithuanian-born British human rights activist (1926-2024)

- Born: Sarah Leah Kacev; 1 April 1926; Mažeikiai, Lithuania
- Died: 25 May 2024 (aged 98)
- Education: University of Cape Town; University of Zimbabwe
- Occupation: Human rights activist
- Children: 3

Leah Levin OBE (1 April 1926 – 25 May 2024) was a Lithuanian-born British human rights activist.

== Biography ==
Levin was born Sarah Leah Kacev on 1 April 1926 in Lithuania and grew up as Leah Katzeff in Piketberg, South Africa.

Levin attended University of Cape Town and the University of Zimbabwe. Levin was director of the Justice organisation from 1982 to 1992. Under her tenure the organisation helped to free the Birmingham Six.

She was an honorary graduate at the University of Essex. She was the author of UNESCO's Human Rights: Questions and Answers, which is one of the world's most widely disseminated books on human rights.

== Personal life ==
Her sons Jeremy Levin and David Levin are businessmen.
