= Agnes Weston =

English philanthropist

Dame Agnes Weston GBE
- Born: 26 March 1840; London, England
- Died: 23 October 1918 (aged 78); Devonport, Borough of Plymouth, Devon, England
- Occupations: Philanthropist, temperance activist, writer
- Known for: First woman given a full ceremonial Royal Navy funeral
- Awards: GBE

Signature
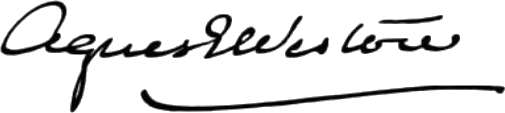

Dame Agnes Elizabeth Weston, GBE (26 March 1840 – 23 October 1918) was an English philanthropist noted for her work with the Royal Navy. For over twenty years, she lived and worked among the sailors of the Royal Navy. The result of her powerful influence is evidenced in the widespread reform which took place in the habits of hundreds of men to whom her name was a talisman for good. In her day, one man in six in the navy was a total abstainer. Weston's work included her monthly letters to sailors, Ashore and Afloat, which she edited, and the "Sailors' Rests", which she established in Portsmouth. She was the first woman given a full ceremonial Royal Navy funeral.

== Early life ==
Weston was born on 26 March 1840 in London, the daughter of a barrister. In 1851 she, her mother and siblings were living in Weston, Bath. She was influenced from her teenage years onward by the Reverend James Fleming, curate of St Stephen, Lansdown, in the parish of Walcot, Bath (1855–1859), an advocate for total abstinence, lack of ritual in religious expression, and living one's faith through good works.

== Career ==
In 1868, she took up hospital visiting and parish work in Bath, and through beginning a correspondence with a seaman who asked her to write to him, developed into the devoted friend of sailors, superintendent of the Royal Naval Temperance Society, and co-founder (with Sophia Wintz) of three Royal Sailors' Rests (two in Plymouth and one in Portsmouth), or clubs for sailors, by the start of the First World War. She published a monthly magazine, Ashore and Afloat, and established temperance societies on naval ships by personal visits to each ship (such as HMS Topaze) at a time when every ship had a grog pot and sailors were issued a daily rum ration. She published her memoirs My Life Among the Bluejackets in 1909.

Weston served as Superintendent of Work among Sailors for the Woman's Christian Temperance Union, and was the President of the Plymouth Branch of the British Women's Temperance Association.

== Honours ==
In June 1918, her work for the Royal Navy was publicly recognised when she was appointed Dame Grand Cross of the Order of the British Empire (GBE). She received an honorary Doctor of Law degree from Glasgow University. On her death at age 78 in Devonport she became the first woman given a full ceremonial Royal Navy funeral.

== Legacy ==
Charles Causley's first collection of poems, Farewell, Aggie Weston (1951) contained his "Song of the Dying Gunner A.A.1":

Farewell, Aggie Weston, the Barracks at Guz,
Hang my tiddley suit on the door
I'm sewn up neat in a canvas sheet
And I shan't be home no more.

A portrait of her is included in the mural of heroic women by Walter P. Starmer unveiled in 1921 in St Jude's Church, Hampstead Garden Suburb, London.

In 2011, a tinned Christmas pudding was discovered at the back of a kitchen cupboard in Poole, Dorset. Donated to the museum at Portsmouth Historic Dockyard, it was a "Peek, Frean & Co's Teetotal Plum Pudding" from 1900. It was one of a thousand puddings sent to British sailors during the Boer War on behalf of Weston.

In March 2020, it was announced that Aggie Weston had come top of a public poll from a list of well-known Plymouth women to decide the recipient of the city's next blue plaque. The plaque was unveiled on International Women's Day 2021, at the entrance to Endurance Court, Oceansgate in Devonport, opposite the site of the original Royal Sailors Rests buildings before their destruction in 1941 during the Plymouth Blitz.
