= Allen Clarke (educationalist) =

- Cyril Alfred Allen Clarke (1910–2007)
- Born: Cyril Alfred Allen Clarke; 20 August 1910; Loddon, Norfolk, UK
- Died: 12 July 2007 (aged 96); Norfolk, United Kingdom
- Education: University of London
- Occupation: Headmaster
- Employer: Holland Park School
- Known for: Educationalist
- Successor: Derek Rushworth
- Spouse: Edna Francis Clarke

Cyril Alfred Allen Clarke (20 August 1910 – 12 July 2007) was the founding head of Holland Park School, which was the flagship of the comprehensive education ideal. Holland Park School, of which Allen Clarke was the first headmaster, was in the 1960s the most famous of its kind in the UK. Founded in 1958, it was dubbed the "socialist Eton" and was the showcase comprehensive school of state education, which aimed to rectify the divisive damage caused by a system that had virtually typecast children as educable or not by the age of 11.

== Education ==
Clarke was educated at the Norwich High School for Boys in Norwich and the University of London, where he read history.

== Personal life ==
He married, in 1934, Edna Francis (died 1981). They had three sons. One of his sons, Robin, died in 1979.

== Career ==
After teacher training at Culham College of Education in Oxfordshire, he joined the London Teaching Service in 1933.

At the outbreak of war he was called up into the Royal Artillery, rising to the rank of major. When the war came to an end he was retained for another year on the staff of the education branch of the Allied Military Government of Germany. One of his tasks was the reorganization of schools in the Munich region.

He was demobilised in 1946 and returned to teaching in London. Then he became assistant master at Haberdashers' Aske's Boys' School, New Cross. In 1951, he was headmaster at Isledon Secondary School, Islington, until 1955. He then spent two years as head of Battersea Secondary School before being offered the headship of Holland Park School in 1957.

This progressive west London comprehensive school offered an education to thousands as an alternative to poorly rated secondary modern schools designed for those unable to make the 11-Plus examination system for a state grammar school education.

In himself, Clarke seemed an unlikely leader for such a radical experiment. He was mild-mannered and conservatively dressed in an academic gown. On one hand Holland Park School had a reputation among wary conservatives in the Swinging Sixties as a progressive hotbed of perceived dubious morals, and on the other the institution Clarke moulded was run on traditional lines. Its pupils wore a uniform, whose jacket sported the school crest, and the school was run on a house system.

Yet Clarke's previous experience had included the headships of two London secondary moderns. That, combined with teaching in a direct grant grammar school, had shown him what equal opportunity could do when combined with the encouragement of excellence.

He was headmaster of Holland Park School from 1957 to 1971.

== Legacy ==
When founding the school, Clarke set himself to plan in meticulous detail. This was done in an ambience of local hostility led by the Campden Hill Preservation Society, which had for some years lobbied against opening a modern school in such an area – its members included the future poet laureate John Betjeman.

Clarke's attention to detail included the design of the school badge, which depicted a fox carrying a dahlia in its jaws, the former acknowledging the family name of the lords Holland on whose land the school was built, the latter referring to Lady Holland's introduction of the bloom into England in the early years of the 19th century. More fundamental to his approach was the establishment of a library for the school.

When the school opened its doors in September 1958, the Notting Hill race riots, which had broken out in August, seemed only to underline the formidable nature of the task of healing social divisions that it had set itself. It was Clarke's philosophy to maintain a large student population – more than 2,000. This size, he felt, would conduce to a greater variety in the backgrounds of pupils, and would enable a greater range of subjects to be taught.

Teaching was at first rigidly streamed. This was subsequently, in the 1970s under Clarke's successor Derek Rushworth, reversed on the theory that underachieving students would benefit from intellectual association with those of greater ability. After a more radical period under Rushworth, Holland Park reverted to more traditional teaching methods in the 1990s.

Whatever Holland Park did tended to be done in the glare of publicity. The conservative wing of the press dearly wanted to find fault with the experiment.

But Clarke's Holland Park could point to its impressive A-level results and university entrance rates. Pupils who had been sidelined under the 11-Plus system were given an educational opportunity, and sense of self-worth, which might not have been possible of in the secondary modern system to which they would otherwise have been fated.

== Decline and death ==
Clarke retired in 1971 to Norfolk. He was from 1994 a governor of his old Norwich school, Langley. He died on 12 July 2007, aged 96.

== See also ==
- Caroline Benn
- Holland Park School
