= Taverham Hall School =

Location
- Taverham; Norfolk, NR8 6HU; United Kingdom; 52°40′45″N 1°10′49″E

Information
- Type: Private day and boarding school
- Motto: Latin: Conanti Dabitur; Through effort we succeed
- Religious affiliation: Anglican
- Established: Founded as Taverham Hall 1920; Merged with Langley Prep 2016
- Founder: Rev'd Frank Glass
- Department for Education URN: 121225 Tables
- Chairman of Governors: Mrs S Turner
- Headmistress: C Rackham
- Staff: 47 teaching, 52 support
- Gender: Co-educational
- Age: 1 to 11
- Enrolment: 308
- Capacity: 476
- Houses: Crows Hawks; Owls Wrens
- Colour
- Former pupils: Old Taverhamians
- Website: http://www.taverhamhall.co.uk

Taverham Hall School was a private co-educational day and boarding preparatory school. Situated in Taverham, Norfolk, it was founded in 1920. The school accommodates over 300 pupils between the ages of 1 and 13. The current headmistress is Clare Rackham. In 2016, Taverham Hall School merged with the preparatory department of Langley School, Loddon, to form Langley Preparatory School at Taverham Hall.

== History ==
In 1623, Augustin Sotherton of Ludham was offered the 3,000 acres (1,214 ha) estate of Taverham. It remained within his family for over 300 years until the Rev'd John Nathaniel Micklethwait, a retired parson, inherited the estate through the female line of his family in 1850. Micklethwait decided to demolish the existing hall and engaged architect, David Brandon, to design a country house befitting a country gentleman. Brandon completed a neo-Jacobean mansion in 1858. The Micklethwaits had no children and subsequently, in 1901, the estate passed through the female line to the Rev'd F C Mills of Warwickshire. Having no desire to live in Norfolk, Mills leased the hall until 1921, when he decided to divide up the estate and sell it at auction.

Rev'd Frank Glass, a schoolmaster, bought the hall with approximately 100 acres (40 ha) of grounds for £12,000 and opened a boys' preparatory school. During the Second World War, the hall was requisitioned by the army. Soldiers' names scratched into the brickwork and bullet holes in the weather vanes are still visible. After the war, the school returned to the hall and prospered under the headship of John Peel. The school later became a charitable trust and co-educational.

== Merger with Langley School ==
In early May 2016, the governors of Taverham Hall announced that the school would merge with Langley School. The announcement was initially greeted with anger in some quarters and the Charity Commission sent inspectors to the school in July that year, citing "regulatory concerns". Langley's prep-school site, Thorpe House, was sold to developers and the merger was concluded for the beginning of the Autumn term, 2016.

== Curriculum ==
Pupils are provided with a wide-ranging and stimulating curriculum It is broadly based on the National Curriculum, but includes Latin and Classical civilisation for all pupils, and French for pupils in the top set. All pupils study ICT, DT and music. Pupils formerly took the Common Entrance Examination at 13+ for entrance to a range of independent senior schools; the majority now move directly from the prep school to the senior school at 11+.

== Extra Curricular ==
The school uses the house system, with 4 school houses for inter-house events including music, athletics (sports day) and swimming.

Houses
	Crows
	Hawks
	Owls
	Wrens

The estate extends to over 100 acres (40 ha), and includes a forest school and a swimming pool. The boarding facilities are in the main hall with the pre-prep, nursery and sports hall in separate buildings. There is an AstroTurf pitch and the grounds provide access to the River Wensum, on which the school has fishing rights.

Sports on offer include Association football, athletics, cricket, hockey, gymnastics, netball, Rugby football, swimming, tennis and water skiing. Extra curricular activities include art, bushcraft, canoeing, debating, kite-making, photography and natural history. The school also has a choir and a rock band. Recent dramatic productions include West Side Story and Ernie and his incredible Illucinations.

The school has an active alumni association.

== Notable former pupils ==
- Jonathan Agnew (1960-), cricketer and broadcaster
- Martin Bell (1938-), broadcaster and MP
- Humphrey Berney (1980-), opera singer
- Rob Newton (1990-), cricketer
- Philip Pullman (1946-), author
- Jack van Poortvliet (2001-), England Rugby international
- Saxon Earley (2002-), professional footballer

== See also ==
- Langley School, Loddon
