= Proctor-Beauchamp baronets =

Title in the Baronetage of Great Britain

- Escutcheon of the Proctor-Beauchamp baronets, Burke version; a Debrett version is first quarter only, for Proctor of Langley Park, all sable
- Creation date: 1745
- Status: extant
- Seat: Langley Park, Norfolk
- Motto: Toujours fidele, always faithful
- Arms: Argent, a chevron, between three martlets sable, for Proctor
- Crest: On a mount, vert, a greyhound, sejant, argent, spotted, brown, collared, or

The Beauchamp-Proctor, later Proctor-Beauchamp Baronetcy, of Langley Park in the County of Norfolk, is a title in the Baronetage of Great Britain. It was created on 20 February 1745 for the twenty-two-year-old William Beauchamp-Proctor, subsequently Member of Parliament for Middlesex. Born William Beauchamp, he assumed the additional surname of Proctor according to the will of his maternal uncle, George Proctor, of Langley Park, Norfolk.

The 2nd Baronet married Mary Palmer, a beauty who was the subject of portraits by George Romney and Benjamin West. The 3rd Baronet was an admiral in the Royal Navy. The 4th Baronet assumed by Royal licence the surname of Proctor-Beauchamp in lieu of Beauchamp-Proctor in 1852 and served as High Sheriff of Norfolk in 1869. He and his wife Catherine Waldegrave had nine children, including the 5th, 6th and 7th Baronets.

== Proctor-Beauchamp baronets, of Langley Park (1745) ==
- Sir William Beauchamp-Proctor, 1st Baronet (1722–1773)
- Sir Thomas Beauchamp-Proctor, 2nd Baronet (1756–1827)
- Sir William Beauchamp-Proctor, 3rd Baronet (1781–1861)
- Sir Thomas William Brograve Proctor-Beauchamp, 4th Baronet (1815–1874)
- Sir Reginald William Proctor-Beauchamp, 5th Baronet, CB (1853–1912)
- Sir Horace George Proctor-Beauchamp, 6th Baronet (1856–1915)
- Sir Montagu Harry Proctor-Beauchamp, 7th Baronet (1860–1939), missionary in Sichuan and one of the Cambridge Seven.
- Sir Ivor Cuthbert Proctor-Beauchamp, 8th Baronet (1900–1971)
- Sir Christopher Radstock Proctor-Beauchamp, 9th Baronet (born 1935)

The heir apparent is the present holder's eldest son Charles Barclay Proctor-Beauchamp (born 1969).)

Portrait of Sir Thomas Beauchamp-Proctor by Benjamin West, 1777

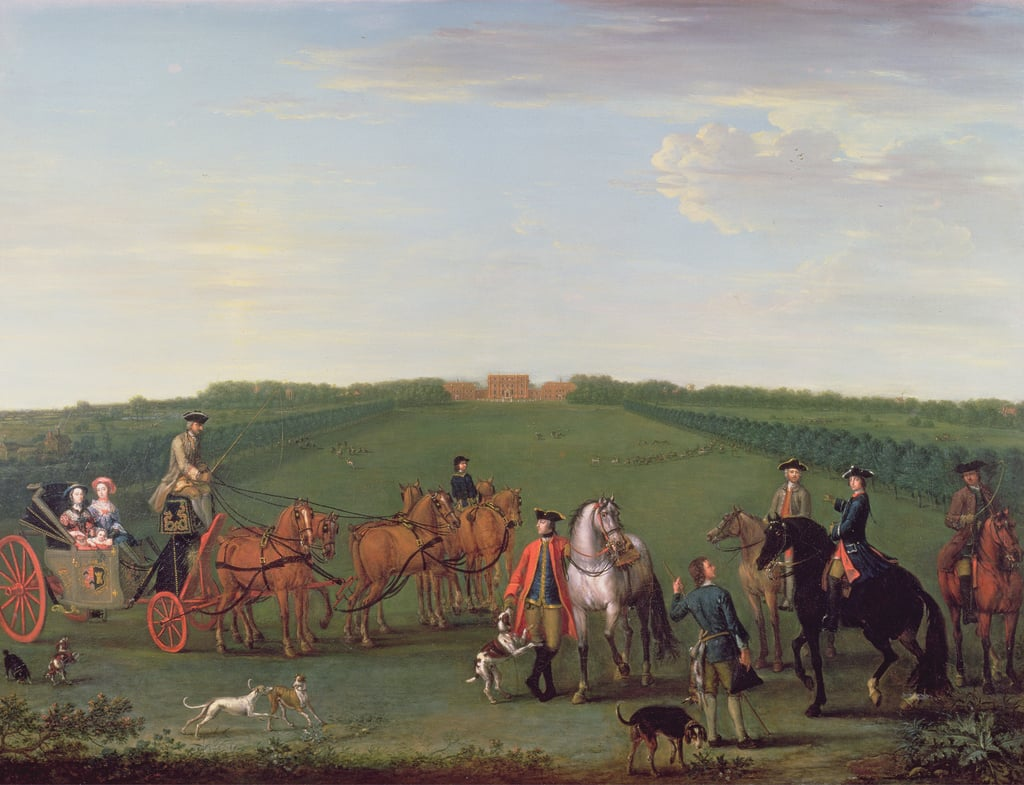
The Beauchamp-Proctor Family and Friends at Langley Park, Norfolk by John Wootton, 1749

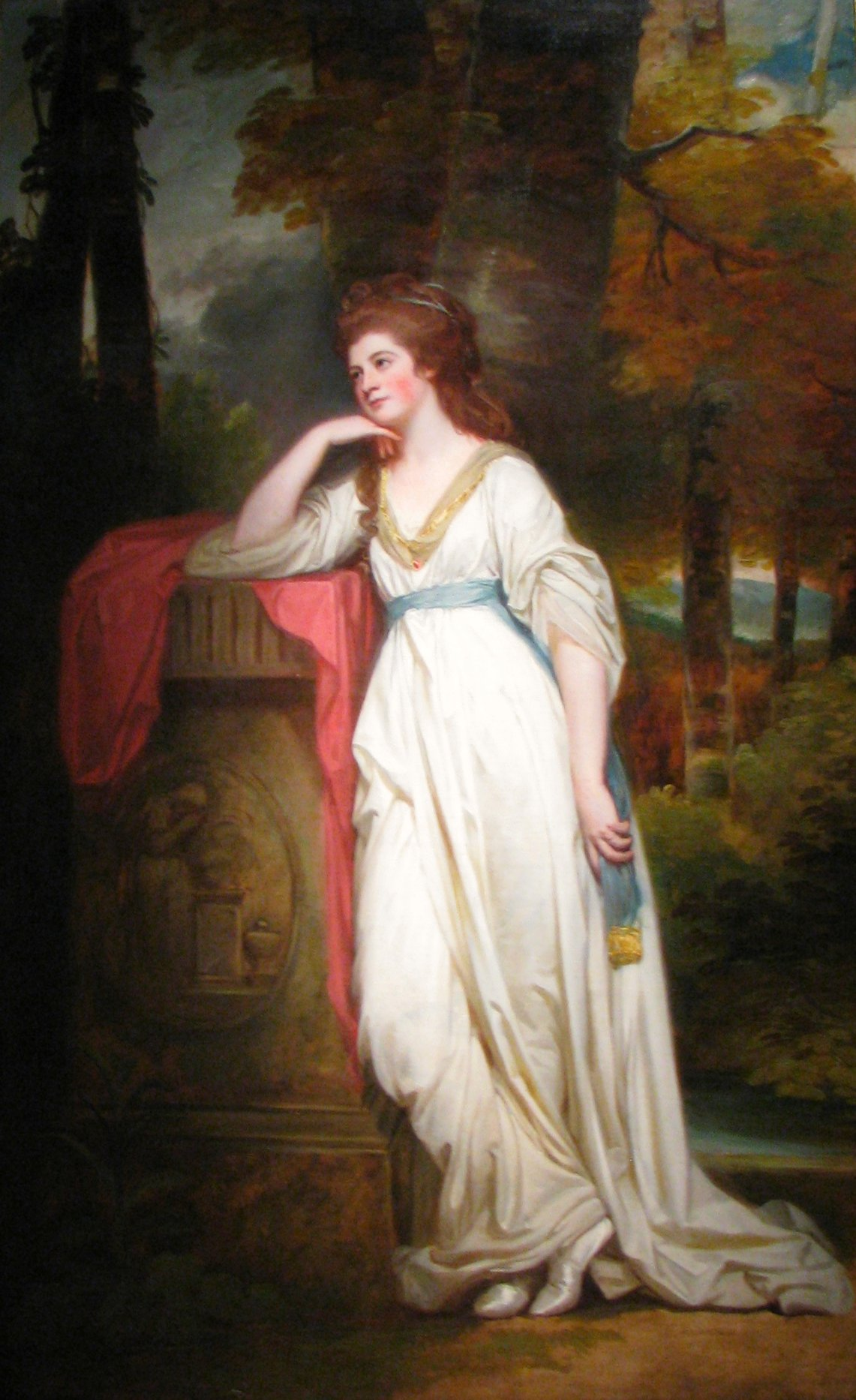
Lady Mary Beauchamp-Proctor by George Romney, 1780s

== Watt v. Beauchamp ==
The 1901 divorce of the 5th Baronet from his wife Lady Violet née Roden for adultery with Hugh Watt MP led to a high-profile libel case in 1905 brought by Mrs Julia Watt, Hugh Watt's wife, against Lady Violet.

== 6th Baronet ==
The 6th Baronet, Horace George, was a lieutenant-colonel in the Norfolk Regiment and was killed in action at Suvla Bay, Turkey, during the First World War. He was born on 3 November 1856 and had joined the army in 1878. His previous service included a year in Sudan (1885–86), for which he was mentioned in dispatches, an honour he also received during the Second Boer War. He was made a Companion of the Order of the Bath in 1902. Retiring in 1904, he was recommissioned at the start of the First World War, in which his nephew Montague Barclay Granville Proctor-Beauchamp served alongside him as a second lieutenant. They were both killed on 12 August 1915 during an abortive advance.

== Extended family ==
- Edward Beauchamp, second son of the Rev. William Henry Beauchamp, second son of the 3rd Baronet, was a politician. In 1911 he became the first of the Beauchamp baronets.
- Edward Halhed Beauchamp (1815–1885), third son of George Edward Beauchamp, second son of the 2nd Baronet, was a captain in the Royal Navy.

Baronetage of Great Britain
Preceded by Wynn baronets	Beauchamp-Proctor baronets of Langley Park; 20 February 1745	Succeeded by Grey baronets
