= Sir William Beauchamp-Proctor, 3rd Baronet =

Royal Navy Admiral (1781–1861)

Admiral Sir William Beauchamp-Proctor Bt DL
- Born: 14 October 1781; Langley Hall, Loddon, Norfolk
- Died: 14 March 1861 (aged 79); Langley Hall, Loddon, Norfolk
- Burial place: St. Michael and All Saints Church, Langley; 52.555237°N 1.472591°E
- Military career
- Allegiance: Kingdom of Great Britain; United Kingdom of Great Britain and Ireland
- Branch: Royal Navy
- Service years: 1794–1809
- Rank: Admiral
- Commands: HMS Zebra; HMS Saracen; HMS Dédaigneuse
- Conflicts: French Revolutionary Wars; Napoleonic Wars

Admiral Sir William Beauchamp-Proctor, 3rd Baronet (14 October 1781 – 14 March 1861) was an officer in the British Royal Navy, who served during the French Revolutionary and Napoleonic Wars.

== Biography ==
Beauchamp-Proctor was born at Langley Hall, Loddon, Norfolk, the eldest son of Sir Thomas Beauchamp-Proctor, 2nd Baronet, and Mary, the second daughter of Robert Palmer, of Sonning, Berkshire. His younger brothers were Colonel Richard Beauchamp-Proctor of the Grenadier Guards (d. 11 August 1850) and Captain Robert Beauchamp-Proctor of the Madras Artillery (d. 23 May 1813). His nephew, Edward Halhead Beauchamp-Proctor, also served as a naval officer.

Beauchamp-Proctor entered the Royal Navy on 4 September 1794, with the rank of able seaman, aboard the 32-gun frigate Stag under Captain Joseph Sydney Yorke. There was a family connection: Beauchamp-Proctor's grandfather Sir William Beauchamp-Proctor, 1st Baronet was, through his second wife Laetitia Johnson's sister Agneta, a brother-in-law of Charles Yorke, Joseph Sydney Yorke's father. On 22 August 1795, now a midshipman, he took part in the engagement off Norway between four Royal Navy frigates and two frigates and a cutter from the Navy of the Batavian Republic. Stag captured the 36-gun frigate Alliante with 240 men aboard, after an action of about an hour, in which the enemy lost between 40 and 50 men killed and wounded, and the British only 4 killed, and 13, including Beauchamp-Proctor, wounded.

He continued to serve in the Stag on the home station until January 1798, when he joined the 98-gun ship London, under Captain John Child Purvis, off Lisbon. The following July he moved to the frigate Flora, under Captain Robert Gambier Middleton, in the Mediterranean, where he was lent for short periods to the frigates Alcmene under Captain Henry Digby, and Minerve under Captain George Cockburn.

Beauchamp-Proctor was commissioned as acting-lieutenant aboard the ship Foudroyant, flagship of Admiral Lord Keith, in August 1800, and on 22 October was transferred to the frigate Diana under Captain Thomas Stephenson. He received confirmation of his commission from the Admiralty on 25 February 1801, and then served in the Egyptian campaign, receiving the Turkish gold medal.

He was promoted to commander on 29 April 1802, and in April 1803, was appointed to command of the bomb vessel Zebra. In July and August 1804 he served under Captain Robert Dudley Oliver in the bombardment of Le Havre, before being given command of the brig-sloop Saracen in August 1804.

Beauchamp-Proctor spent the next six months in Saracen, cruising in the Channel, before sailing for the East Indies in March 1805 aboard Hindostan. On his arrival in July he was given acting-command of the 36-gun frigate Dédaigneuse, but was not confirmed in his post-rank until 5 September 1806.

On 21 November 1808, at sunset, Dédaigneuse was stationed off the Isle de France when she encountered the French 36-gun frigate Sémillante returning from a cruise in the Indian Ocean. Dédaigneuse gave chase and by midnight the two ships were no more than half a mile apart. Dédaigneuse fired two or three shots from her bow-chasers, and then a full broadside, as Sémillante tacked. Dédaigneuse followed suit, but because of the lightness of the wind, the ship would not come round. A boat was lowered down to tow her round, and she was finally able to pursue the Frenchman, now some distance ahead. Dédaigneuse had lost a great deal of copper, being very foul, and at best a bad working ship, so gradually dropped further astern. Beauchamp-Proctor eventually abandoned the chase at about 5 p.m, and soon afterwards Sémillante anchored in Port Louis. Dédaigneuse continued to patrol the waters off the Isle de France until her water and provisions were almost expended, before sailing to Madagascar to reprovision, and then sailed to Bombay. When the commander-in-chief expressed himself dissatisfied with his conduct, Captain Beauchamp-Proctor requested a court-martial, which was held aboard Culloden in Bombay harbour on 27 March 1809. Every officer of his ship gave strong evidence in the captain's favour, and the court acquitted him of all blame, laying responsibility squarely on the poor sailing qualities of Dédaigneuse.

Beauchamp-Proctor returned to Britain on sick-leave in November 1809, and despite never serving at sea again, received regular promotions; to rear-admiral in November 1846, to vice-admiral in September 1850, and in June 1857 to admiral, on the retired list.

On 20 May 1812 he married Anne Gregory (1792-1859), the daughter of Thomas Gregory and Julia Elizabeth Brograve, and the niece and heir of Thomas Brograve, of Springfield Place, Essex, and granddaughter of Sir Berney Brograve, 1st Baronet. They had three sons and four daughters.

Beauchamp-Proctor was appointed Deputy Lieutenant for Norfolk in August 1820, and succeeded his father as third Baronet on 29 June 1827. He was nominated as High Sheriff for Norfolk in November 1831.

Beauchamp-Proctor died on 14 March 1861, and he, alongside many other members of his family, was buried at the church of St Michael and All Saints, close to his family home.

== See also ==
- Proctor-Beauchamp baronets
- O'Byrne, William Richard (1849). "Proctor, William Beauchamp" . A Naval Biographical Dictionary . John Murray – via Wikisource.

Baronetage of Great Britain
Preceded by Thomas Beauchamp-Proctor	Baronet (of Langley Park); 1827–1861	Succeeded by Thomas William Brograve Proctor-Beauchamp
