= Norwich High School for Boys =

Former independent school in Norwich, England

Coordinates: 52.553°N 1.467°E

Norwich High School for Boys was an independent school in Norwich, England. Founded in 1910, it became the Langley School shortly after World War II.

== History ==
Norwich High School for Boys was founded in 1910 by Jeremiah George Chapman. He was born in Panxworth, Norfolk in 1859 and came to Norwich aged eleven to train under Mr J H Tench who became an Inspector of Schools. He started his teaching career at the King Edward VI Middle School, of which ultimately he became house master. In 1910, the school was amalgamated with the Higher Grade School and the Presbyterian School to form the City of Norwich School. At this time, at the request of parents, Mr Chapman started the part boarding, part day school in St Giles, Norwich where he was the principal until his death on 26 September 1936.

The school started with 80 boys in St Giles's House, but when the numbers grew, Mr Chapman built a new school building on an adjoining site. During certain periods as many as 240 boys were in the school, including 40 boarders. Some of them came from different parts of England and others from South America, France and Jersey. The school celebrated its silver jubilee in 1935.

The school produced a magazine, and copies from 1912 to 1919 have been added to the world war 1 school archives website http://www.worldwar1schoolarchives.org/langley-school/

During the Second World War, the school moved out of Norwich to Langley Park, near Loddon, Norfolk. It was still known as Norwich High School for Boys in 1943, but is now known as Langley School.

== Notable former pupils ==
Famous alumni included the actor John Mills who joined the school in the winter of 1920. According to comments in his autobiography, he was badly bullied at the school. However, after fighting back against his bully, new systems were put in place and he quotes the Headmaster as saying "I suppose one could say that the school owes you a vote of thanks". During his time at the school he was offered a trial for Norwich City Football Club, coxed the senior maiden four in the school rowing club and was in the first eleven at cricket. He was not so successful in the classroom leading his father to give him the ultimatum to improve or he would remove him from the school. He did improve and enjoyed the remainder of his time at the school
