= Justice (organisation) =

Human rights organization in the UK

- Founded: 1957
- Type: Charitable organisation
- Registration no.: England and Wales: 1058580
- Legal status: Registered charity
- Purpose: Law reform, human rights
- Headquarters: London
- Region served: England and Wales
- Chief executive: Fiona Rutherford
- Website: https://www.justice.org.uk

Justice (stylised "JUSTICE") is a human rights and law reform organisation based in the United Kingdom. It is the British section of the International Commission of Jurists, the international human rights organisation of lawyers devoted to the legal protection of human rights worldwide. Members of Justice are predominantly barristers and solicitors, judges, legal academics, and law students.

Justice is independent and all-party, having representatives of the three major political parties on its ruling Council. It is a registered charity under English law.

Justice's chief executive is Fiona Rutherford, and the chair of the JUSTICE Council is Baroness Kennedy of the Shaws QC.

== History ==
=== 1957–2000 ===
Justice was founded in 1957, following the visit of a group of British lawyers to observe the treason trials of members of the African National Congress (ANC) in apartheid South Africa and the show-trials in communist Hungary. Its first chairman was Hartley Shawcross, the chief British prosecutor at Nuremberg. Other founding members included Sir John Galway Foster QC, and Peter Benenson who later established Amnesty International. Indeed, when AI first started in 1961, it shared its offices with JUSTICE.

In 1958, it became the British section of the International Commission of Jurists (ICJ). The original terms of Justice's constitution committed it "to uphold and strengthen the principles of the Rule of Law in the territories for which the British Parliament is directly or ultimately responsible: in particular, to assist in the administration of justice and in the preservation of the fundamental liberties of the individual". Indeed, JUSTICE itself gave rise to a number of subordinate branches in what were then still British colonies and dependent territories. As each of these countries moved towards independence in the 1960s, the branches reconstituted themselves as national sections of the ICJ. This, in turn, shifted the emphasis of Justice's own work towards the UK itself.

Thus, although founded with an international orientation, Justice quickly established a specific focus on the rule of law and protection of fundamental rights in the UK. Through the work of its first secretary, Tom Sargant OBE, Justice rapidly developed expertise in cases involving miscarriages of justice, and secured the release of many prisoners who had been wrongly imprisoned. Sargant was instrumental in the establishment of the BBC series Rough Justice, which led to the release from prison of eighteen victims of miscarriages of justice.

At the same time Justice developed as a policy organisation, producing reports that helped establish the UK's ombudsman system, the Criminal Injuries Compensation Board, the Rehabilitation of Offenders Act 1974, the Data Protection Act 1998, and the Criminal Cases Review Commission. Similarly, many of the measures contained in the Constitutional Reform Act 2005 were previously put forward by JUSTICE. Through the 1990s it established and developed programmes on human rights legislation, criminal justice, asylum and immigration, discrimination and privacy. It campaigned for the incorporation of the European Convention on Human Rights into UK law by way of the Human Rights Act 1998.

=== Since 2000 ===
In October 2009, it became the first NGO to intervene in a case before the UK Supreme Court in the case of HM Treasury v Ahmed.

Following Justice's intervention in Cadder v HM Advocate, JUSTICE Scotland was launched in July 2012. The first JUSTICE Scotland working party report, looking at legal assistance in police stations, was published in July 2018.

Following the suspension of all new trials due to the 2020 Covid-19 pandemic, Justice led a series of mock virtual trials to examine viability and safety.

=== Leadership ===
Previous directors of Justice include Dame Anne Owers CBE, Her Majesty's Chief Inspector of Prisons, Leah Levin OBE, a founder and trustee of Redress, and Andrea Coomber QC (Hon), chief executive of the Howard League for Penal Reform. Previous chairs of Justice include Lord Alexander of Weedon QC, Lord Goodhart QC, Paul Seighart, and Lord Steyn, a former Law Lord.

== Current work ==
The main areas of Justice's work are:

- Human rights
- Criminal justice
- EU law
- The rule of law

Justice's focus is on UK law but its work involves highlighting the importance of international human rights law as well as bringing to bear the insights of comparative analysis of other jurisdictions. European law plays an increasingly large role in this work. It works primarily by briefing parliamentarians and policy-makers on the human rights implications of legislation. As a policy organisation it is less involved in overt campaigning and individual casework and more on providing independent, expert legal analysis on matters of fundamental rights. It also works at the European and international levels, lobbying the European Union institutions, the Council of Europe and the various United Nations treaty bodies.

Each of Justice's areas of work in turn covers a broad range of issues, including asylum and immigration, counter-terrorism, equality and discrimination, privacy, EU Freedom Justice and Security issues, legal aid and access to justice, as well as constitutional issues tied to the role of the judiciary and parliamentary scrutiny of legislation.

Justice also has a long history of intervening in cases of public importance involving the protection of fundamental rights. To this end, it has intervened before in cases before the Court of Appeal and the House of Lords, the Privy Council, the European Court of Human Rights, and the European Court of Justice.

== See also ==
- Rule According to Higher Law
