= Holland Park School =

School in Kensington and Chelsea

Coordinates: 51.5047°N 0.2011°W

Location
- Airlie Gardens; Campden Hill Road; Holland Park; London, W8 7AF; England

Information
- Type: Academy; Comprehensive school
- Motto: Latin: Floreat semper schola (May our school always flourish)
- Established: 1958
- Local authority: Kensington and Chelsea
- Trust: United Learning
- Department for Education URN: 149632 Tables
- Ofsted: Reports
- Headteacher: Dame Sally Coates
- Gender: Coeducational
- Age: 11 to 18
- Enrolment: 1,396 (2022)
- Houses: Anderson, Baker, Bennett, Chappell, Seeley
- Colours: Blue, yellow, pink, red and green
- Website: hollandparkschool.co.uk

Holland Park School is a coeducational comprehensive secondary school and sixth form located in Holland Park, London, England. Opened in 1958, the school was considered a flagship for comprehensive education, nicknamed 'the socialist Eton', and at one time had over 2,000 students.

== History ==
The school was built in 1957 by Sir Ahmed Omar and Daniel J Noel, with his father, Michael Noel.

The school had its first pupil intake in 1958. The formal school opening took place on 23 October 1959 and was made by politician and local resident Lady Norman.

In 1969, Hilary Benn represented the school in Top of the Form. Journalist George Gale in 1970 whilst editor of The Spectator claimed that Holland Park girls were running a vice ring at the school. The school snubbed the 1973 wedding of Princess Anne by working through the national holiday granted to schools and giving children another holiday in lieu.

There was up to £50,000 in damage due to arson, around Saturday 22 February 1975.

In 1977, punk band The Slits, supported by The Moors Murderers, performed a benefit concert for the NSPCC at the school.

In 1985 the then headmaster Derek Rushworth, was beaten up and had both his ankles broken.

By 1997, the school was heavily criticised by Ofsted for poor academic standards and lack of discipline.

In 2000, the school was visited by Nelson Mandela. The next year, the school received its new headmaster, Colin Hall, assigned with the job to turn its fortunes around. Hall reintroduced mandatory school uniforms. and banding in place of teaching mixed-ability classes. In 2006, fingerprint activated locks were installed on lockers, while the decision to sell parts of the school grounds to finance a new school building caused controversy in 2007.

Fourteen years after being criticised for poor academic standards, the school was classed as "outstanding" by Ofsted. A new school building opened in 2012, and in 2013, the school was converted to academy status.

In September 2021, over 100 alumni published an open letter to its governors, Ofsted, and the government, alleging that they experienced a "toxic and abusive" environment while at Holland Park. The letter also included a 25-page appendix featuring personal testimonies from former students. Some key allegations were "serious failings in pastoral care and safeguarding of pupils, including 'off-rolling' of some students and failure to act appropriately in peer-on-peer sexual assault.". Further criticism followed in January 2022 with the decisions of the Royal Borough of Kensington and Chelsea called into question for enabling the allegedly "toxic culture" engendered by the school's management, with payments totaling £95 million having been awarded by the council to the school, including a £280,000 salary paid to headteacher Colin Hall.

In light of the developments in January 2022, Hall announced he would retire at the end of 2021-22 academic year. However, on 2 February 2022, a media statement was released by the school stating that Hall's tenure was to be ended with immediate effect and he would be replaced by Arwel Jones.

After receiving a Notice to Improve from the Education and Skills Funding Agency in November 2021, Holland Park's governing body decided that the school should join the United Learning multi-academy trust (MAT). The decision to join the academy chain, which is based in Peterborough, triggered reports of disorder together with protests and by students and parents, who threatened to issue governors with a judicial review. Kensington and Chelsea Council proposed that the school join a local academy trust with Kensington Aldridge Academy, and Felicity Buchan, the member of Parliament for Kensington, wrote that she has "had very real concerns about the decision-making process surrounding the future of Holland Park School", including "the lack of consultation with parents and local stakeholders" and "the lack of transparency in the process".

The school formally joined United Learning in January 2023, and became a part of a cluster with The Hurlingham Academy in Fulham and The Elms Academy in Clapham.

== School organisation ==
When the school opened in September 1958, it was divided into eight houses. The eight houses were originally called Addison, Fox, Hunter, Macauley, Maine, Newton, Norman and Wilberforce. The house system has been retained, though there have been changes to the number of houses and their names. There are currently five houses: Anderson, Baker, Bennett, Chappell and Seeley. The earlier approach of naming houses after historical figures has been replaced by the approach of naming them after people, mostly governors of the school or teachers, who "mark a way of being that the school considers worthy and noble".

When the school first opened, the entire school assembled on only two days a week, in the Main Hall and four side halls which opened out to form The Great Hall. House assemblies took place in the morning in the side halls, with two halls alternating where they shared, whilst the other two days were for tutor groups within the house setting. Thus pupils had the potential, in theory at least, for guidance from form teachers, tutors, as well as their class subject teachers. There was a complete structure of prefects; at the summit, two head boys and two head girls, then headmasters/senior prefects, prefects, sub-prefects, and TSPs (temporary sub prefects). This separate organisation was particularly called upon when teaching staff took the decision to stop monitoring the substantial play-grounds, in the sometimes turbulent mix of social classes, religious and ethnic origins, and the heady mix of boy and girl in the 1960s. Mr Williams, in the mid-1960s, one of two deputy heads, was required to dispense summary justice on boys presented by prefects.

In the 1960s and 1970s, the philosophy was to ensure large student numbers (over 1,900), with the idea that the resulting size would enable more subject choices for the students. Indeed, amongst the more typical foreign languages, Latin, French and Spanish were taught. A similar philosophy and scale applied to other comprehensive flagships, such as the other "Labour-party Eton", the Haverstock School.

In the early 1960s, each school year was divided into A, B, C, D, and E streams up until the 3rd year. As the groups were so large, they were again divided, typically into 3. Later the "A" "B" etc. grading was considered to be bad for children's self-esteem, so "A" "B" and "C" were replaced by "H" "P" and "S" (Holland Park School). Nowadays, the banding system is divided into 4 bands, each with 3 levels inside them.

In 1970, streaming was completely scrapped in favour of total egalitarianism. Another aspect of egalitarian thought was that multiple school traditions were dropped, and in the 1970s there were no awards for academic achievement, in order not to demoralise low achievers. Derek Rushworth, who became head in 1971, nevertheless favoured high achievement in niche areas and himself continued to teach Latin to children who requested lessons. His motto was "Everyone should know about everything," and critics saw this as leading to a dumbing down of the curriculum.

The theory was that poorly achieving students would perform better if not segregated but rather immersed in an equal learning environment.

Loyalists of the egalitarian approach argue that the experiment was never given a proper chance: Holland Park was the only fully comprehensive school in a borough where middle-class parents tended to favour private schools. Therefore, by definition, it was a sink school, and thus some argue that the comprehensive experiment was never fully realised. Critics counter that the school was on a downward spiral and "more of the same" would only have worsened the situation. They hold that the school's improved performance when it returned to more traditional values is evidence that the comprehensive experiment was doomed from the outset.

This viewpoint differs from some experience in the mid-1960s when sixty or more fifth formers joined either the lower sixth on A-level studies, or another thirty joined 6G that represented students on retakes of O levels or additional O levels, or technical studies.

In 2021 more than 100 alumni signed a letter accusing the school of having an emotionally damaging environment.

== Land history ==
In 1808, William Phillimore (1748–1814) signed an agreement for the development of over 19 acres (77,000 m^{2}) of land, which now is roughly occupied by Holland Park School and Queen Elizabeth College, north of Duchess of Bedford Walk. On this land, seven particularly grand houses with large gardens were completed in 1817. Throughout the 19th century, and until the Second World War, they had a series of notable occupants. At one time in the 19th century, the approach road was known as Dukes' Row, because two of the houses were occupied by dukes, the Duke of Argyll and the Duke of Bedford, while a third was occupied by the Earl of Airlie.

Of the seven great houses on this part of the Phillimore estate, only Thorpe Lodge still remains. It is a protected historical building that serves as an ancillary space for the school. It was home to Henry Tanworth Wells from 1875 until his death in 1903. Montagu Norman, Governor of the Bank of England, was a resident from 1904 until his death in 1950. Priscilla Reyntiens joined Norman at Thorpe Lodge following their marriage on 21 January 1933.

=== 1956 building ===
When plans to build the school were revealed in 1956, local residents formed an action group to stop the building. Among its members were the future poet laureate John Betjeman, who worried about the trees, the naturalist Peter Scott, who claimed the children would frighten away nightingales, and the High Commissioner of South Africa, who feared that his garden parties would be ruined. The Kensington Post was inundated with letters from residents, who feared that the school would "reduce Campden Hill to Earl's Court". The lobbyists were unsuccessful; the demolition began around 1957 and the first comprehensive school opened in 1958. It was officially inaugurated a year later by Lady Norman.

=== 2004 building ===
In 2004, planning for a new school building began. Although the proposals were hotly debated, with a major concern among critics being the sale of the school sports grounds to a property developer as a way to fund the project, the new school building opened in 2012. The following summer, the school was accused of breaking undertakings given to secure the planning permission, because local residents were not permitted to use the swimming pool in the new six-storey building, as had been promised. Proposals to find a compromise were under investigation.

== Staff relations ==
In 2019, 31 staff and former staff raised concerns with the Education and Skills Funding Agency (ESFA) about bullying. Leadership and safeguarding in the school were judged by the Office for Standards in Education, Children's Services and Skills (Ofsted) to be "effective" in a subsequent visit. It was later alleged that confidential questionnaires completed by staff in 2020 that were critical of the leadership had not been forwarded to Ofsted as required. In 2021, an investigation was launched into the school following allegations by 25 former teachers that it was a "toxic" working environment.

As part of the report into the school, dozens of former pupils and staff were interviewed and allegations stretched between 2004 and 2021. In February Colin Hall, who was headmaster for all of that period, stated he would retire at the end of the school year, but his employment was instead terminated with immediate effect.

Many students who attended the school during Hall's tenure complained of ‘exploitative’ relationships, with some students with staff and telling investigators they were "still traumatised by their experiences at Holland Park School". There was said to be a culture of "fear, favouritism and inequality" at the school together with bullying of both teachers and students. When invited to respond to the accusations made, the independent investigation undertaken for the Board of Governors of Holland Park School noted "a number of members of the Holland Park School senior leadership team declined to be interviewed...".

== School publication ==
In the 1960s and into the early 1970s, the school magazine was called Octavo (the title being a reference to the number of houses at that time, which numbered eight). In the 1976-9 period, the school magazine was called Andarkol. This was the name of a cartoon dog. The magazine contained poetry, music reviews, cartoons, as well as articles about school plays and sports, and student-contributed essays on comprehensive education and the representation of the school in the press. Before Andarkol, the school had a magazine called Feedback, which ended in 1974.

Students now receive a booklet every half-term called 'Et cetera' about upcoming events around the school.

- Alpha (founded 1958)
- Octavo (196?–197?)
- Feedback (?–1974)
- Andarkol (1976–79)
- In the Know (?-present)

== Headteachers ==
- Allen Clarke (1958–1971)
- Derek Rushworth (1971–1985)
- Maggie Pringle (1985–1995)
- Mary Marsh (1995–2001)
- Colin Hall (2001–2022)
- Arwel Jones (2022–2022)
- Stephen Parsons (2022-2023)
- Dame Sally Coates (2023 - 2024)
- Samson Oluwasanya (2024 -2025)
- Dame Sally Coates (2024 – present)

== Notable former pupils ==
- Derek Abbott, scientist
- Jenny Abramsky, media producer and philanthropist
- Angela Barry, writer
- Hilary Benn, British Labour Party politician
- Melissa Benn, journalist and writer
- Guy Burnet, actor
- Charlie Condou, actor and columnist
- Peter Dazeley, photographer, fine artist, writer and author
- Tom Dixon, industrial designer
- Omid Djalili, stand-up comedian and actor
- Nabil Elouahabi, actor
- Rakin Fetuga, rapper
- Flora Fraser, writer.
- Christian Henson, television and film composer
- Marko Hoare, historian
- Anjelica Huston, Oscar-winning actress
- Andrzej Jackowski, painter, printmaker, drafter and teacher
- Daniel James, game developer and CEO of Three Rings Design
- Evgeny Lebedev, owner of The Independent and the Evening Standard
- Jeremy Levin, CEO of Teva Pharmaceutical Industries, the world's largest generic drug manufacturer and Israel's largest company
- Cyril Nri, actor
- Miquita Oliver, television presenter
- Bel Powley, actress
- Jason Salkey, actor
- Kasete Naufahu Skeen, ski champion
- Gwyneth Strong, actress
- Lesley Thomson, novelist and creative writing tutor
- Polly Toynbee, writer
- AJ Tracey, musician
- Shakka (singer), musician
- Ari Up, musician
- Amal el-Wahabi, British woman charged with supporting terrorism
- Yazz (born Yasmin Evans), singer
- Emily Young, sculptor, daughter of author and politician Lord Kennet
- Nadhim Zahawi, British Conservative Party politician
- Drummie Zeb (born Angus Gaye), musician of Aswad

== Notable teachers ==
- Christine Blower, French teacher (from 1973) became the 11th General Secretary of the National Union of Teachers (NUT)
- Suneet Chopra, science teacher, went on to become politician and social activist
- Allen Clarke, founding headmaster and history teacher
- Paul Farmer, Head of Music 1974-77, who devised the first CSE in Pop
- Bryan Ferry, pottery teacher, went on to become lead singer for Roxy Music
- Barnaby Lenon, chairman of the Independent Schools Council (ISC)
- Andy Mackay, music teacher, went on to become the saxophonist for the group Roxy Music
- David Malouf, English teacher, went on to become a novelist
- Mary Marsh, former head teacher, now non-executive director of HSBC Bank PLC and member of the Governing Body at London Business School
- Carolyn McCall, completed one year of teacher's training at Holland Park School and is now chief executive of ITV
- Jane Miller, English teacher, author of six non-fiction books and regular contributor to London Review of Books
- Iain Reddish, taught French, Spanish, went on to become Greenpeace activist.
- Mike Walling, English teacher, was a winner on the TV show New Faces in the late 1970s and starred in the British television sitcoms Brush Strokes and The Smoking Room
- Ian Whitwham, author of At the Chalkface: Great Moments in Education, which draws on his almost 30 years of teaching at Holland Park, also a regular contributor to The Guardian
- Lynn Faulds Wood, French teacher, went on to become a television presenter and journalist.
