= Langley Hall =

Palladian-style house in Norfolk, England

Coordinates: 52.5530°N 1.4674°E

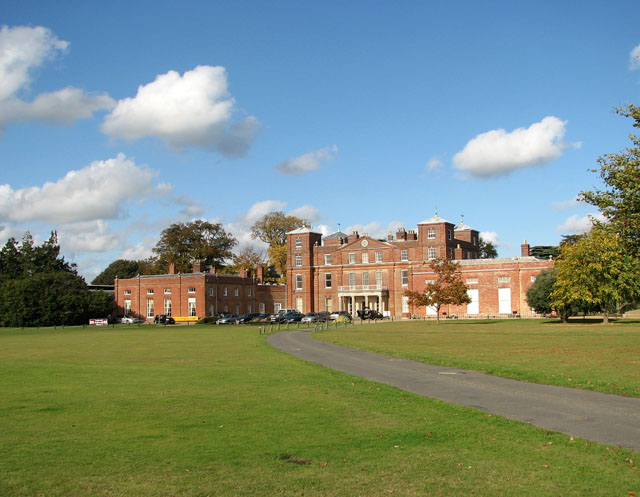
View of Langley Hall

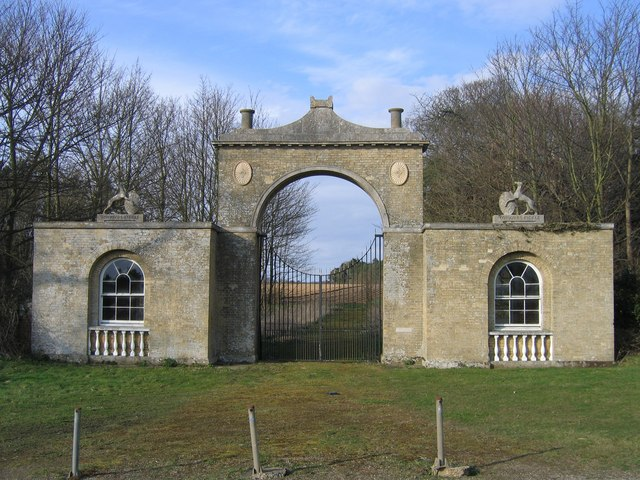
Gateway to Langley Park

Langley Hall is a red-brick building in the Palladian style, formerly a country house but now a private school, located near Loddon, Norfolk, England. It is a grade I listed building.

The house was built in the Palladian style of nearby Holkham Hall, though much smaller: a large principal central block linked to two flanking secondary wings by short corridors. It was later enlarged with the addition of corner turrets by George Proctor and wings by Sir William Beauchamp-Proctor, and addition of a Doric portico in the 19th century. The interior of the Hall boasts fine plaster decorations in the library attributed to the court sculptor of Frederick V of Denmark, Charles Stanley. The fine ceiling in the ladies' boudoir, on 'Music and Entertainment', was painted by Andien de Clermont prior to his return to France in 1755.

The Hall was originally built c.1730 for Richard Berney, on 25 hectares (60 acres) of land that until the Dissolution of the Monasteries belonged to Langley Abbey. It was sold a few years later to George Proctor, who commissioned Matthew Brettingham to remodel the building. In 1744, the estate was inherited by Proctor's nephew, William Beauchamp who, in compliance with his uncle's will, changed his name to Beauchamp-Proctor and who was created a baronet the following year. The family later changed their name to Proctor-Beauchamp. He completed the building work and employed Lancelot Brown to advise on the landscaping. In 1785 new entrance lodges were built to the design of architect John Soane.

The estate remained in the Proctor-Beauchamp family until the 20th century. During the second world war the house was occupied by the army and the pasture land ploughed. After the war the house and grounds were bought by Langley School, an independent boarding and day school, and the lodges separately sold.
