= St Faith's and Aylsham Rural District =

Rural districts in Norfolk, England

Coordinates: 52.74°N 1.26°E

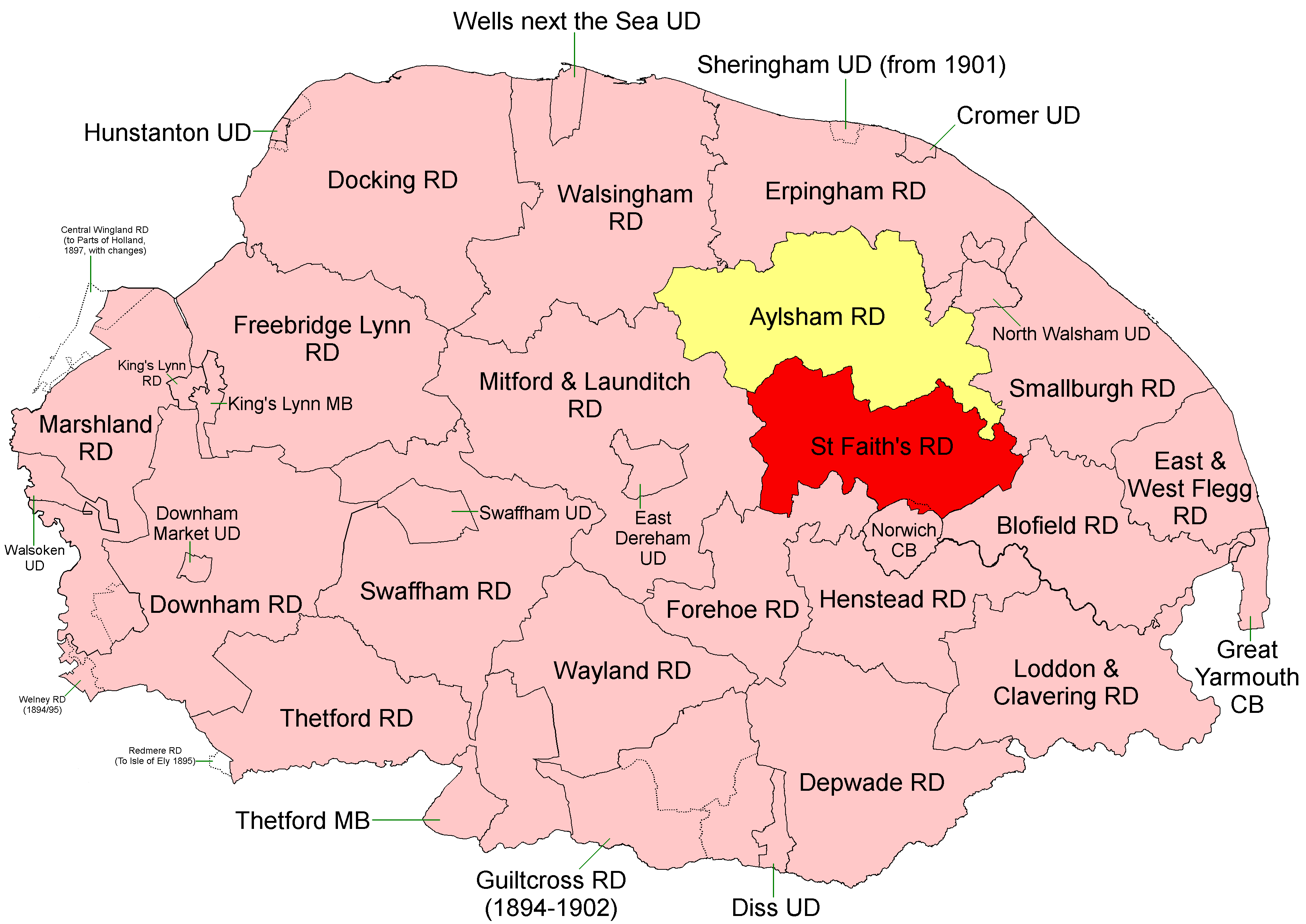
Boundaries in 1894.
St Faith's RD in red, Aylsham RD yellow.

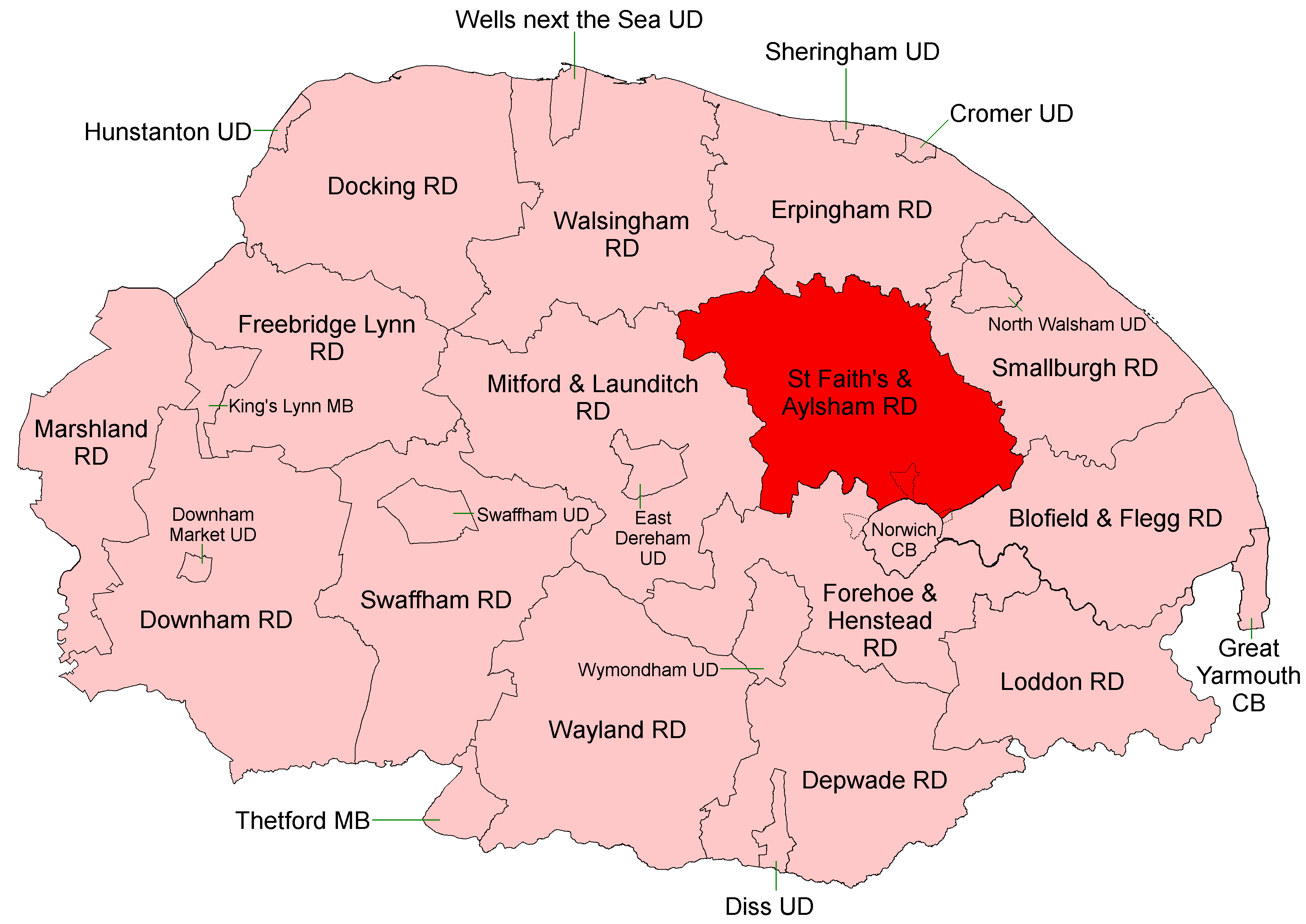
Boundaries in 1935

St Faith's and Aylsham Rural Districts were adjacent rural districts in Norfolk, England from 1894 to 1935.

They were formed under the Local Government Act 1894 based on rural sanitary districts of the same names, and lay to the north of Norwich.

In 1935 some northern parts of Aylsham RD were variously transferred to Walsingham, Erpingham and Smallburgh RDs. The remainder, and the whole of St Faith's RD, were merged to form St Faith's and Aylsham Rural District. Changes to the border with Norwich County Borough were made in 1907, 1951 and 1968.

In 1974, the merged district was abolished under the Local Government Act 1972, and became part of the Broadland district.

== Statistics ==
Year	St Faith's RD			Aylsham RD		
Year	Area (ha)	Population	Density (pop/ha)	Area (ha)	Population	Density (pop/ha)
1911	19,803	10,807	0.55	28,062	17,344	0.62
1921	19,803	10,917	0.55	28,062	16,345	0.58
1931	19,803	14,111	0.71	28,062	16,212	0.58
	St Faith's and Aylsham RD					
1951	37,638	37,629	1.00			
1961	37,638	46,003	1.22			

== Parishes ==
These parishes operated within St Faith's and Aylsham RD unless otherwise indicated.

Parish	From	To	Notes
Alby with Thwaite		1935	Aylsham RD. To Erpingham RD
Alderford			St Faith's RD
Attlebridge			St Faith's RD
Aylsham			Aylsham RD
Banningham		1935	Aylsham RD. To Erpingham RD
Beeston St Andrew			St Faith's RD
Belaugh			Aylsham RD
Blickling			Aylsham RD
Booton			St Faith's RD
Brampton			Aylsham RD
Brandiston			St Faith's RD
Burgh		1935	Aylsham RD. Added to Tuttington
Buxton		1935	Aylsham RD. Component of Buxton with Lammas
Buxton with Lammas	1935		Merger of Buxton and Lammas with Little Hautbois
Calthorpe		1935	Aylsham RD. To Erpingham RD
Catton			St Faith's RD
Cawston			Aylsham RD
Colby		1935	Aylsham RD. To Erpingham RD
Coltishall			Aylsham RD
Corpusty		1935	Aylsham RD. To Erpingham RD
Crostwick			St Faith's RD
Drayton			St Faith's RD
Erpingham		1935	Aylsham RD. To Erpingham RD
Felthorpe			St Faith's RD
Foulsham			Aylsham RD
Frettenham			St Faith's RD
Great Hautbois		1935	Aylsham RD. Added to Coltishall
Great Witchingham			St Faith's RD
Guestwick			Aylsham RD
Hackford		1935	Aylsham RD. Component of Reepham
Hainford			St Faith's RD
Haveringland			St Faith's RD
Hellesdon			St Faith's RD
Hevingham		1935	Aylsham RD. Added to Reepham
Heydon			Aylsham RD
Hindolveston		1935	Aylsham RD. To Walsingham RD
Honingham			St Faith's RD
Horsford			St Faith's RD
Horsham St Faith and Newton St Faith			St Faith's RD
Horstead with Stanninghall			St Faith's RD
Ingworth		1935	Aylsham RD. To Erpingham RD
Itteringham		1935	Aylsham RD. To Erpingham RD
Lammas with Little Hautbois		1935	Aylsham RD. Component of Buxton with Lammas
Little Barningham		1935	Aylsham RD. To Erpingham RD
Little Witchingham			St Faith's RD
Mannington		1935	Aylsham RD. To Erpingham RD
Marsham			Aylsham RD
Morton on the Hill			St Faith's RD
Oulton			Aylsham RD
Oxnead		1935	Aylsham RD. Added to Brampton
Rackheath			St Faith's RD
Reepham	1935		Merger of Reepham with Kerdiston, Whitwell and Hackford
Reepham with Kerdiston		1935	Aylsham RD. Component of Reepham
Ringland			St Faith's RD
Salhouse			St Faith's RD
Salle			Aylsham RD
Saxthorpe		1935	Aylsham RD. To Erpingham RD
Scottow		1935	Aylsham RD. To Smallburgh RD
Skeyton		1935	Aylsham RD. To Smallburgh RD
Spixworth			St Faith's RD
Sprowston			St Faith's RD
Stratton Strawless			Aylsham RD
Swannington			St Faith's RD
Swanton Abbott		1935	Aylsham RD. To Smallburgh RD
Taverham			St Faith's RD
Themelthorpe			Aylsham RD
Thurning		1935	Aylsham RD. To Walsingham RD
Tuttington			Aylsham RD
Weston Longville			St Faith's RD
Whitwell		1935	Aylsham RD. Component of Reepham
Wickmere		1935	Aylsham RD. To Erpingham RD
Wolterton			Aylsham RD. To Erpingham RD
Wood Dalling			Aylsham RD
Wood Norton		1935	Aylsham RD. To Walsingham RD
Wroxham			St Faith's RD
