= 2023 Broadland District Council election =

2023 UK local government election

- 4 May 2023

All 47 seats to Broadland District Council 24 seats needed for a majority

	First party	Second party
Leader	Shaun Vincent	Susan Holland
Party	Conservative	Liberal Democrats
Last election	33 seats, 45.9%	12 seats, 27.6%
Seats before	30	12
Seats won	21	14
Seat change	▼12	▲2
Popular vote	26,946	17,151
Percentage	38.2%	24.3%
Swing	▼7.7%	▼3.3%
	Third party	Fourth party
Leader	Natasha Harpley	Jan Davis
Party	Labour	Green
Last election	2 seats, 20.6%	0 seats, 4.4%
Seats before	3	2
Seats won	8	4
Seat change	▲6	▲4
Popular vote	18,584	7,335
Percentage	26.4%	10.4%
Swing	▲5.8%	▲6.0%
- Winner of each seat at the 2023 Broadland District Council election
Leader before election
Shaun Vincent
Conservative
Leader after election
Susan Holland
Liberal Democrat
No overall control

The 2023 Broadland District Council election took place on 4 May 2023 to elect members of Broadland District Council in Norfolk, England. This was on the same day as other local elections.

The council was under Conservative majority control prior to the election. They remained the largest party after the election but lost their majority, leaving the council under no overall control. The Conservative leader, Shaun Vincent, lost his seat. A coalition of the Liberal Democrats, Labour and Greens subsequently formed, with Liberal Democrat leader Susan Holland being appointed leader of the council at the subsequent annual council meeting on 25 May 2023, defeating the new Conservative group leader Fran Whymark.

== Summary ==
=== Election result ===
2023 Broadland District Council election
Party	Candidates	Seats	Gains	Losses	Net gain/loss	Seats %	Votes %	Votes	+/−
Conservative	47	21	1	13	▼12	44.7	38.2	26,946	–7.7
Liberal Democrats	47	14	3	1	▲2	29.8	24.3	17,151	–3.3
Labour	47	8	6	0	▲6	17.0	26.4	18,584	+5.8
Green	26	4	4	0	▲4	8.5	10.4	7,335	+6.0
Reform	5	0	0	0	Steady	0.0	0.6	419	N/A
Heritage	1	0	0	0	Steady	0.0	<0.1	30	N/A

== Ward results ==
The Statement of Persons Nominated, which details the candidates standing in each ward, was released by Broadland District Council following the close of nominations on 5 April 2023.

=== Acle ===
Acle
Party	Candidate	Votes	%	±%
Conservative	Lana Hempsall*	395	46.9	–6.2
Labour	Emma Covington	357	42.3	+11.7
Liberal Democrats	Victor Morgan	91	10.8	–5.6
Majority		38	4.6	
Turnout		851	36.5	+1.1
Registered electors		2,329		
Conservative hold		Swing	▼9.0	

=== Aylsham ===
Aylsham (3 seats)
Party	Candidate	Votes	%	±%
Liberal Democrats	Sue Catchpole*	1,668	61.0	–0.8
Liberal Democrats	Steve Riley*	1,532	56.0	+8.9
Liberal Democrats	Abu Miah	1,336	48.9	–10.0
Conservative	Nigel Steele	697	25.5	–5.4
Conservative	Andrew Hadley	616	22.5	N/A
Conservative	Craig Turner	580	21.2	N/A
Labour	Cheryl Bould	376	13.8	+2.9
Green	Thomas Walker	342	12.5	N/A
Labour	Kevin Cunnane	341	12.5	+2.8
Labour	Kay Montandon	337	12.3	N/A
Turnout		2,734	38.8	+3.2
Registered electors		7,040		
Liberal Democrats hold				
Liberal Democrats hold				
Liberal Democrats hold				

=== Blofield with South Walsham ===
Blofield with South Walsham (2 seats)
Party	Candidate	Votes	%	±%
Conservative	Nigel Brennan*	775	43.3	–8.3
Conservative	Paul Newstead	648	36.2	–12.7
Labour	Julia Adams	378	21.1	–4.5
Green	Killan Engelhard	374	20.9	N/A
Labour	Christine Hemmingway	316	17.7	–0.8
Liberal Democrats	Malcolm Prior	308	17.2	–13.1
Green	Lynn Smithdale	264	14.8	N/A
Liberal Democrats	Thomas Sherwood	255	14.3	N/A
Reform	Justine Thomas*	106	5.9	N/A
Turnout		1,789	35.1	+3.0
Registered electors		5,094		
Conservative hold				
Conservative hold				

=== Brundall ===
Brundall (2 seats)
Party	Candidate	Votes	%	±%
Green	Jan Davis*	1,272	61.9	+37.9
Green	Eleanor Laming*	1,163	56.6	+40.0
Conservative	Rory Marsden	508	24.7	–24.7
Conservative	Karl Sales	435	21.1	–21.2
Labour	Josephine Archer	225	10.9	–13.8
Labour	Glenn Springett	152	7.4	–14.3
Liberal Democrats	Eleanor Mason	137	6.6	N/A
Liberal Democrats	Stephen Jefford	91	4.4	–10.4
Turnout		2,054	41.2	+4.3
Registered electors		4,981		
Green gain from Conservative				
Green gain from Conservative				

=== Burlingham ===
Burlingham
Party	Candidate	Votes	%	±%
Green	Jess Royal	352	42.8	+30.0
Conservative	James Knight	267	32.4	–1.4
Labour	Christopher Jones	165	20.0	+1.3
Liberal Democrats	Susan Matthew	39	4.7	–7.8
Majority		85	10.4	N/A
Turnout		823	38.5	+8.7
Registered electors		2,136		
Green gain from Conservative		Swing	▲15.7	

=== Buxton ===
Buxton
Party	Candidate	Votes	%	±%
Liberal Democrats	Mark Goodman	457	60.1	+14.7
Conservative	Becky Comer	214	28.1	–17.0
Labour	Stephen McNair	90	11.8	+2.3
Majority		243	32.0	
Turnout		764	35.8	+2.7
Registered electors		2,133		
Liberal Democrats hold		Swing	▲15.9	

=== Coltishall ===
Coltishall
Party	Candidate	Votes	%	±%
Conservative	Jo Copplestone*	404	53.6	–2.7
Labour	Marilyn Heath	229	30.4	+6.0
Liberal Democrats	Beverly Jenkins	64	8.5	–10.8
Green	Elfrede Brambly-Crawshaw	57	7.6	N/A
Majority		175	23.2	
Turnout		758	36.7	+4.8
Registered electors		2,068		
Conservative hold		Swing	▼4.4	

=== Drayton North ===
Drayton North
Party	Candidate	Votes	%	±%
Conservative	Adrian Crotch*	261	41.6	–15.1
Liberal Democrats	Ethan Medler	240	38.3	–4.9
Labour	Dominic Bray	125	19.9	N/A
Majority		21	3.3	−24.5
Turnout		627	28.5	−0.1
Registered electors		2,813		
Conservative hold		Swing	▼5.1	

=== Drayton South ===
Drayton South
Party	Candidate	Votes	%	±%
Liberal Democrats	Paul Auber	355	48.6	+24.5
Conservative	Hal Turkmen	283	38.7	–20.2
Labour	Mark Smith	93	12.7	–4.3
Majority		72	9.9	
Turnout		733	36.9	+2.3
Registered electors		1,988		
Liberal Democrats gain from Conservative		Swing	▲22.4	

=== Eynesford ===
Eynesford
Party	Candidate	Votes	%	±%
Liberal Democrats	David Thomas	386	40.5	+3.2
Conservative	Kellie Vanham	349	36.6	–10.5
Labour	Irene MacDonald	147	15.4	–0.2
Green	Georgie Oatley	72	7.5	N/A
Majority		37	3.9	
Turnout		957	37.9	+6.1
Registered electors		2,524		
Liberal Democrats gain from Conservative		Swing	▲6.9	

=== Great Witchingham ===
Great Witchingham
Party	Candidate	Votes	%	±%
Conservative	Peter Bulman*	380	52.4	+6.7
Liberal Democrats	Ian Webb	182	25.1	+2.4
Labour	Helen Lindsay	163	22.5	–9.1
Majority		198	27.3	
Turnout		736	33.8	+1.0
Registered electors		2,179		
Conservative hold		Swing	▲2.2	

=== Hellesdon North West ===
Hellesdon North West (2 seats)
Party	Candidate	Votes	%	±%
Conservative	Shelagh Gurney*	750	52.0	–1.8
Conservative	Bill Johnson	625	43.3	+1.4
Labour Co-op	Ian Duckett	483	33.5	+8.2
Labour Co-op	Andrew Lock	370	25.6	N/A
Green	Ken Parsons	222	15.4	+0.9
Liberal Democrats	Bob Fowkes	213	14.8	–4.4
Turnout		1,443	30.9	+2.4
Registered electors		4,668		
Conservative hold				
Conservative hold				

=== Hellesdon South East ===
Hellesdon South East (2 seats)
Party	Candidate	Votes	%	±%
Conservative	Lacey Douglas	628	44.3	+4.8
Conservative	Simon Jones	512	36.1	+1.8
Liberal Democrats	David Britcher*	483	34.1	–2.3
Liberal Democrats	Gemma Diffey	457	32.2	+11.0
Labour	Ellie Petersen	271	19.1	–1.5
Labour	Rebecca Williams	255	18.0	±0.0
Green	Gil Murray	130	9.2	–4.2
Turnout		1,418	32.6	+3.6
Registered electors		4,355		
Conservative hold				
Conservative gain from Liberal Democrats				

=== Hevingham ===
Hevingham
Party	Candidate	Votes	%	±%
Liberal Democrats	Shane Ward	358	47.7	–4.6
Conservative	Timothy Joudrey	267	35.6	–1.5
Labour	Tony Hemmingway	72	9.6	–1.1
Reform	Simon Bayes	53	7.1	N/A
Majority		91	12.1	
Turnout		751	33.2	+0.7
Registered electors		2,265		
Liberal Democrats hold		Swing	▼1.5	

=== Horsford and Felthorpe ===
Horsford and Felthorpe (2 seats)
Party	Candidate	Votes	%	±%
Liberal Democrats	Lisa Starling*	915	68.9	+1.8
Liberal Democrats	Nich Starling	832	62.7	+7.5
Conservative	Andrew McClure	312	23.5	–1.4
Conservative	David Willmott	292	22.0	–2.3
Labour	Laura-Jane Pond	116	8.7	–1.0
Labour	Brenda Jones	115	8.7	N/A
Turnout		1,328	29.8	–0.1
Registered electors		4,460		
Liberal Democrats hold				
Liberal Democrats hold				

=== Marshes ===
Marshes
Party	Candidate	Votes	%	±%
Conservative	Grant Nurden*	436	46.9	–6.9
Labour	John Chapman	287	30.9	+7.4
Green	Caroline Fernandez	141	15.2	N/A
Liberal Democrats	Philip Matthew	65	7.0	–15.7
Majority		149	16.0	
Turnout		934	36.3	+3.7
Registered electors		2,572		
Conservative hold		Swing	▼7.2	

=== Old Catton and Sprowston West ===
Old Catton and Sprowston West (3 seats)
Party	Candidate	Votes	%	±%
Conservative	Karen Vincent*	1,036	47.0	–2.7
Conservative	Ken Leggett*	973	44.2	–3.6
Conservative	Richard Potter*	869	39.4	–7.3
Labour	Williams Couzens	738	33.5	+14.0
Labour	Harvey Tarlton	582	26.4	+7.1
Labour	James Vasco	559	25.4	+8.4
Green	Ian Chapman	402	18.2	+1.5
Liberal Democrats	Martin Callam	345	15.7	–5.3
Liberal Democrats	Thomas Maxwell	307	13.9	–6.7
Liberal Democrats	John Chettleburgh	300	13.6	+2.1
Turnout		2,203	32.7	+1.5
Registered electors		6,734		
Conservative hold				
Conservative hold				
Conservative hold				

=== Plumstead ===
Plumstead
Party	Candidate	Votes	%	±%
Green	James Harvey	490	46.8	–1.9
Conservative	Shaun Vincent*	414	39.6	–11.7
Labour	Alan Pawsey	142	13.6	N/A
Majority		76	7.2	
Turnout		1,051	38.1	+4.7
Registered electors		2,762		
Green gain from Conservative		Swing	▲4.9	

=== Reepham ===
Reepham
Party	Candidate	Votes	%	±%
Liberal Democrats	Stuart Beadle*	374	43.8	+1.0
Conservative	Roy Ashman	235	27.5	–6.4
Green	Sarah Morgan	134	15.7	–1.5
Labour	Jo Emmerson	111	13.0	+6.9
Majority		139	16.3	
Turnout		864	40.5	–2.2
Registered electors		2,132		
Liberal Democrats hold		Swing	▲3.7	

=== Spixworth with St Faiths ===
Spixworth with St Faiths (2 seats)
Party	Candidate	Votes	%	±%
Liberal Democrats	Dan Roper*	960	68.2	+4.1
Liberal Democrats	Susan Holland*	759	53.9	+2.6
Conservative	Lawrence Hill	278	19.7	–5.6
Conservative	Andrew Cooper	227	16.1	–9.1
Labour	Natalie Aldous	138	9.8	+0.3
Labour	Pam Harwood	127	9.0	+0.8
Reform	David Alderson	100	7.1	N/A
Turnout		1,408	31.5	+1.4
Registered electors		4,471		
Liberal Democrats hold				
Liberal Democrats hold				

=== Sprowston Central ===
Sprowston Central (2 seats)
Party	Candidate	Votes	%	±%
Labour	Natasha Harpley*	711	51.3	+9.8
Labour	Adrian Tipple	634	45.7	–2.4
Conservative	John Fisher	438	31.6	–5.7
Conservative	Yvonne Astley	433	31.2	–1.7
Liberal Democrats	Mark Armstrong	139	10.0	+1.0
Liberal Democrats	Jack Cook	128	9.2	N/A
Reform	Richard Richardson	85	6.1	N/A
Turnout		1,386	33.0	–2.0
Registered electors		4,201		
Labour hold				
Labour hold				

=== Sprowston East ===
Sprowston East (3 seats)
Party	Candidate	Votes	%	±%
Labour	Martin Booth	1,071	47.0	+18.8
Labour	Bibin Baby	957	42.0	+17.2
Labour	Emma Tovell	924	40.5	+17.6
Conservative	Judy Leggett*	849	37.2	–12.4
Conservative	David Harrod	815	35.7	–20.6
Conservative	Tod James	792	34.7	–12.3
Green	Jim Green	253	11.1	N/A
Green	David Brambley-Crawshaw	182	8.0	N/A
Green	Gregory Laming	173	7.6	N/A
Liberal Democrats	Ian Leach	142	6.2	–11.9
Liberal Democrats	Jean Markwell	131	5.7	–7.8
Liberal Democrats	Allan Rockach	86	3.8	–9.1
Turnout		2,280	29.1	–1.4
Registered electors		7,834		
Labour gain from Conservative				
Labour gain from Conservative				
Labour gain from Conservative				

=== Taverham North ===
Taverham North (2 seats)
Party	Candidate	Votes	%	±%
Liberal Democrats	Caroline Karimi-Ghovanlou*	567	50.3	+12.4
Liberal Democrats	Tony Yousefian	451	40.0	+9.3
Conservative	Tony Adams*	402	35.6	–8.3
Conservative	Stuart Dunn	373	33.1	–2.0
Labour	Colin Harris	190	16.8	–4.7
Labour	Jean Stafford-Baker	172	15.2	–2.8
Turnout		1,128	27.6	+0.3
Registered electors		4,085		
Liberal Democrats hold				
Liberal Democrats gain from Conservative				

=== Taverham South ===
Taverham South (2 seats)
Party	Candidate	Votes	%	±%
Conservative	Stuart Clancy	814	59.0	–8.4
Conservative	Kenneth Kelly	669	48.5	–3.6
Labour	Tracy Chapman	249	18.1	+3.8
Labour	Ruth Goodall	215	15.6	+2.8
Liberal Democrats	Malcolm Clayton	208	15.1	–1.3
Liberal Democrats	Shirley Clayton	201	14.6	–0.5
Green	Claire Marcham	113	8.2	N/A
Green	Tomas Fraser	93	6.7	N/A
Heritage	Monica Ma	30	2.2	N/A
Turnout		1,379	37.6	+2.4
Registered electors		3,672		
Conservative hold				
Conservative hold				

=== Thorpe St Andrew North West ===
Thorpe St Andrew North West (3 seats)
Party	Candidate	Votes	%	±%
Labour	Jo Bailey	1,129	48.5	+19.8
Labour	Calix Eden*	1,073	46.1	+17.9
Labour	Drew Moore	1,022	43.9	+15.7
Conservative	Peter Berry	989	42.5	–13.0
Conservative	Ian Mackie*	947	40.7	–9.4
Conservative	John Ward	934	40.1	–8.8
Liberal Democrats	Jon Goodwin	256	11.0	–3.7
Liberal Democrats	Brian Howe	218	9.4	–5.1
Liberal Democrats	Michael Simpson	137	5.9	–8.3
Turnout		2,328	39.2	+3.2
Registered electors		5,942		
Labour gain from Conservative				
Labour gain from Conservative				
Labour gain from Conservative				

=== Thorpe St Andrew South East ===
Thorpe St Andrew South East (3 seats)
Party	Candidate	Votes	%	±%
Conservative	Jonathan Emsell	860	43.7	–11.0
Conservative	Fraser Bowe	817	41.5	–12.6
Conservative	Trudy Mancini-Boyle	759	38.6	–8.3
Labour	Carol Ferris	702	35.7	+15.3
Labour	Sandra O'Neill	626	31.8	+12.5
Labour	Nick Williams	588	29.9	+10.7
Green	Andrew Cawdron	270	13.7	–2.2
Green	Suzanne Green	264	13.4	–1.9
Liberal Democrats	Phyllida Scrivens	230	11.7	–4.0
Liberal Democrats	Bryn Mainwaring	212	10.8	–4.3
Green	Peter Goonery	203	10.3	N/A
Liberal Democrats	Victor Scrivens	183	9.3	–3.7
Turnout		1,967	35.4	+1.1
Registered electors		5,560		
Conservative hold				
Conservative hold				
Conservative hold				

=== Wroxham ===
Wroxham (2 seats)
Party	Candidate	Votes	%	±%
Conservative	Martin Murrell*	682	50.0	+6.8
Conservative	Fran Whymark*	677	49.6	+3.3
Labour	Malcolm Kemp	247	18.1	+10.1
Green	Nick Ball	218	16.0	+3.3
Labour	Terry McIlwee	214	15.7	+9.4
Liberal Democrats	Peter Sergeant	180	13.2	–12.7
Liberal Democrats	Sidney Kettle	171	12.5	–9.7
Green	Kerry Walker	151	11.1	+3.6
Reform	Peter Freeman	75	5.5	N/A
Turnout		1,364	31.1	+0.9
Registered electors		4,388		
Conservative hold				
Conservative hold				

== By-elections ==
=== Thorpe St Andrew North West ===
Thorpe St Andrew North West by-election, 7 September 2023
Party	Candidate	Votes	%	±%
Conservative	Peter Charles Berry	870	50.5	+8.0
Labour	Carol Ann Ferris	757	43.9	±0.0
Liberal Democrats	Victor Frederick Morgan	96	5.6	−5.4
Turnout			29.45	
Registered electors		5,898		
Conservative gain from Labour				

This by-election was triggered by the resignation of Labour councillor Drew Moore.

=== Acle ===
Acle by-election, 15 May 2025
Party	Candidate	Votes	%	±%
Reform	Jimmi Lee	322	33.2	N/A
Conservative	Vincent Tapp	208	21.4	−25.4
Green	Peter Carter	200	20.6	N/A
Labour	Emma Covington	186	19.2	−23.2
Liberal Democrats	Phillip Mathew	54	5.6	−5.2
Turnout		974	38.4	
Registered electors		2,534		
Reform gain from Conservative				

This by-election was triggered by the resignation of long-time Conservative councillor Lana Hampsell.
