= Tuttington =

Village in Norfolk, England

Coordinates: 52.79612°N 1.30188°E

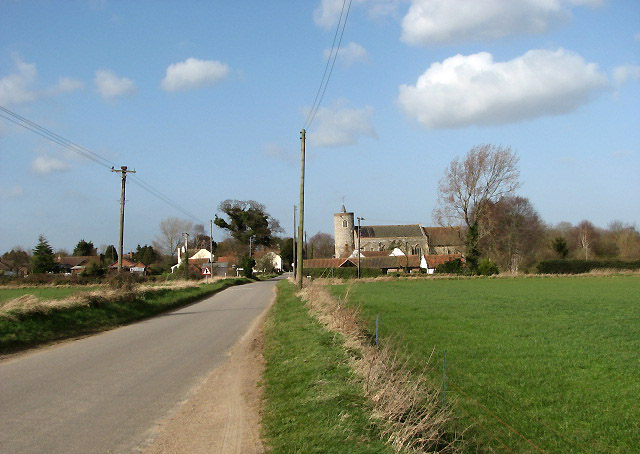
- Approach to Tuttington from the south

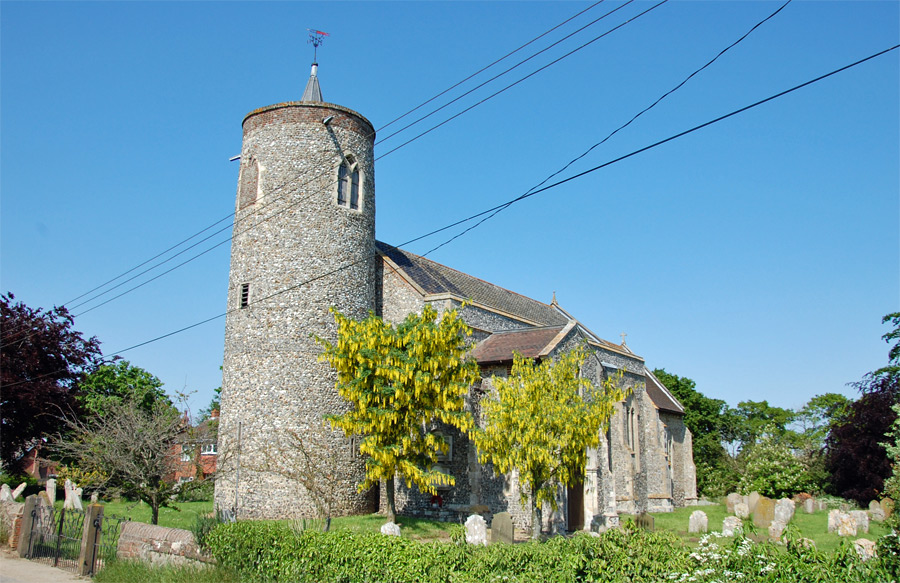
- St Peter and St Paul Church

- Location within Norfolk
- OS grid reference: TG220270
  - London: 129 miles (208 km)
- Civil parish: Burgh and Tuttington
- District: Broadland
- Shire county: Norfolk
- Region: East
- Country: England
- Sovereign state: United Kingdom
- Post town: AYLSHAM
- Postcode district: NR11
- Dialling code: 01263
- Police: Norfolk
- Fire: Norfolk
- Ambulance: East of England

Tuttington is a village and former civil parish, now in the parish of Burgh and Tuttington, in the Broadland district, in the county of Norfolk, England. The village is 11.1 miles south of Cromer, 15 miles north of Norwich and 129 miles north-east of London. The village lies 3 miles east of the nearby town of Aylsham.

The village’s name probably means 'farm/settlement connected with Tutta' or perhaps, 'farm/settlement of Tutta's people'.

The nearest railway station is at North Walsham for the Bittern Line which runs between Sheringham, Cromer and Norwich. The nearest airport is Norwich International Airport.

Its church, St Peter and St Paul, is one of 124 existing round-tower churches in Norfolk.

Opposite the church, there is a Dutch gabled building that used to be the village shop and post office, which closed in May 1987. Next door to that there used to be a pub called The Ship. It has been suggested that as the village is several miles from the sea or any navigable waterways, this name could be a corruption of The Sheep, as the pub may have been a welcome watering hole for drovers.

== Civil parish ==
On 1 April 1935 the parish of Burgh was merged with Tuttington, on 21 April 1980 the parish was renamed "Burgh & Tuttington". In 1931 the parish of Tuttington (prior to the merge) had a population of 152.
