= Hainford =

Village in Norfolk, England

Coordinates: 52.721738°N 1.3°E

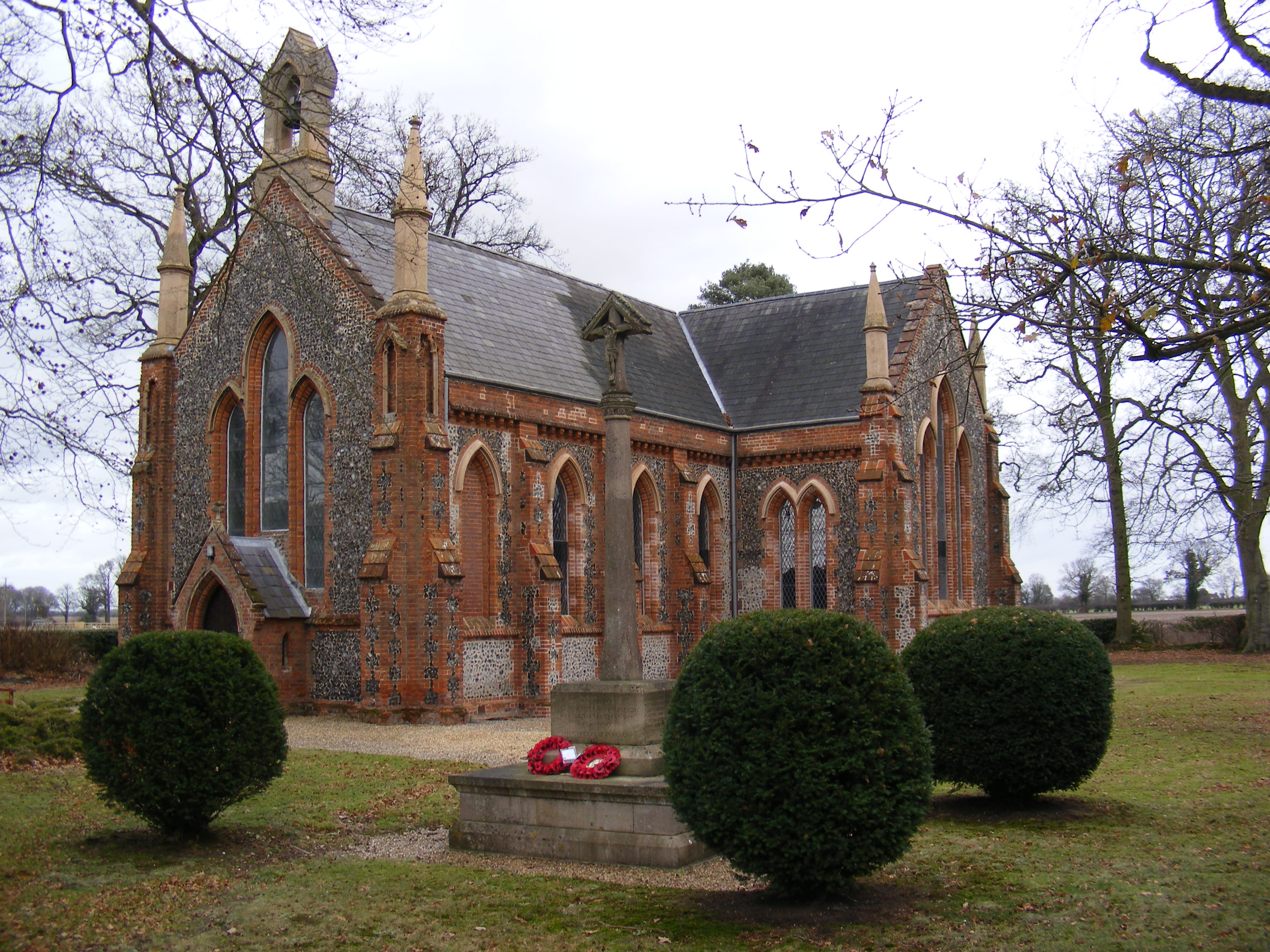
- All Saints' Church

- Location within Norfolk
- Area: 2.68 sq mi (6.9 km^{2})
- Population: 1,037 (2021 census)
  - Density: 387/sq mi (149/km^{2})
- OS grid reference: TG229188
- Civil parish: Hainford
- District: Broadland
- Shire county: Norfolk
- Region: East
- Country: England
- Sovereign state: United Kingdom
- Post town: NORWICH
- Postcode district: NR10
- Dialling code: 01603
- Police: Norfolk
- Fire: Norfolk
- Ambulance: East of England
- UK Parliament: Broadland and Fakenham

Hainford (originally Haynford) is a village and civil parish in the English county of Norfolk.

Hainford is located 5.6 miles (9.0 km) south of Aylsham and 6.7 miles (10.8 km) north of Norwich.

== History ==
Hainford's name is of Anglo-Saxon origin and derives from the Old English for 'enclosure ford.'

In the Domesday Book, Hainford is listed as a settlement of 9 households hundred of Taverham. In 1086, the village was part of the East Anglian estates of Roger the Poitevin.

Hainford Hall was built in the 18th century and is now derelict. The hall was at one time the property of Jonathan Worrell who owned 139 enslaved people in Barbados.

During the Second World War, several anti-invasion defences were built in Hainford. Furthermore, a stick of Luftwaffe bombs were dropped in the nearby Waterloo Plantation in an attempt to hit Stratton Strawless Hall which was being used as a radar installation.

There were two aircraft crashes in Hainford during the Second World War. In 1942, a Bristol Beaufighter of No. 68 Squadron RAF crashed in the parish likely flying from RAF Coltishall and in April 1945 a Consolidated B-24 Liberator of the 458th Bomb Group, 754th Bombardment Squadron crashed in the parish, two of the seven crew survived.

== Geography ==
According to the 2021 census, Hainford has a population of 1,037 people which shows an increase from the 989 people recorded in the 2011 census.

The B1354, between Thursford and Saxthorpe, passes through the village.

== All Saints' Church ==
Hainford's parish church dates from the 19th century and was built to the designs of John Brown. All Saints' is located outside of the village of Newton Road and has been Grade II listed since 1984. The church holds Sunday services most weeks.

The ruins of the medieval All Saints' Church also stands within the parish.

== Amenities ==
The Chequers Pub has stood in the village since 1789. The thatched building burnt down in 1987, which resulted in the death of one firefighter. Christopher 'Sam' William Betts (28) died during the clear up/damping down when a chimney collapsed on him. The pub remains open.

Hainford Church of England Primary School is located within the village which is part of the Harnser Schools Federation. The headteacher is Mr. P. Cross.

== Governance ==
Hainford is part of the electoral ward of Hevingham for local elections and is part of the district of Broadland.

The village's national constituency is Broadland and Fakenham which has been represented by the Conservative Party's Jerome Mayhew MP since 2019.

== War Memorial ==
Hainford War Memorial is a stone calvary cross with an octagonal shaft which lists the following names for the First World War:

Rank	Name	Unit	Date of death	Burial/Commemoration
Capt.	Douglas G. Rooke	Coldstream Guards	2 Nov. 1918	Staglieno Cemetery
St1C	Frederick T. Ulph	HMS Begonia	29 Mar. 1916	Portsmouth Naval Memorial
St1C	Arthur J. Larwood	HMS Marmion	21 Oct. 1917	Chatham Naval Memorial
Cpl.	William A. Tallowin	Water Transport, Royal Engineers	17 Sep. 1918	St. Omer Cemetery
LCpl.	Frederick Smithson	10th Bn., Queen's Royal Regiment	28 Apr. 1918	Esquelbecq Cemetery
Gnr.	Arthur J. Fiddy	87th Bde., Royal Field Artillery	15 Dec. 1918	Dernancourt Cemetery
Gnr.	Arthur J. Howard	104th Bty., Royal Garrison Artillery	21 May 1916	Basra Memorial
Gnr.	Cornelius Skipper	293rd Bty., R.G.A.	12 Oct. 1917	Dozinghem Cemetery
Pte.	John T. Coleman	36th Bn., Australian Imperial Force	10 Jan. 1917	All Saints' Churchyard
Pte.	Arthur J. Earl	10th Bn., Essex Regiment	6 Apr. 1918	Hangard Cemetery
Pte.	George W. Wright	14th Bn., Gloucestershire Regiment	21 Aug. 1917	Villers-Faucon Cemetery
Pte.	Robert J. Haines	144th Coy., Labour Corps	19 Mar. 1918	Oxford Road Cemetery
Pte.	Stanley E. Curson	4th Bn., Norfolk Regiment	19 Apr. 1917	Jerusalem Memorial
Pte.	John Fiddy	7th Bn., Norfolk Regt.	27 Aug. 1917	Monchy-le-Preux Cemetery
Pte.	Sidney Howard	7th Bn., Norfolk Regt.	5 Dec. 1917	Honnechy Cemetery
Pte.	Edward Smith	7th Bn., Norfolk Regt.	7 May 1917	Arras Memorial
Pte.	M. Norman Larwood	8th Bn., Norfolk Regt.	19 Jul. 1916	Thiepval Memorial
Pte.	Ivan S. Woodcock	10th Bn., Norfolk Regt.	3 Jun. 1916	All Saints' Churchyard
Pte.	George H. Ulph	12th Bn., Norfolk Regt.	6 Apr. 1918	Jerusalem War Cemetery
Pte.	Alfred W. Burton	1st Bn., North Staffordshire Regt.	14 Mar. 1915	Cite Bonjean Cemetery
Pte.	Arthur W. Royal	8th Bn., Queen's Own Regiment	22 Mar. 1918	Pozières Memorial
Pte.	Herbert Furness	2/7th Bn., Sherwood Foresters	21 Mar. 1918	Arras Memorial
Pte.	Frank E. Furness	21st Bn., West Yorkshire Regiment	29 Mar. 1918	Mindel Trench Cemetery
Pte.	Frank Howard	2/7th Bn., Worcestershire Regiment	10 Oct. 1916	Loos Memorial
Pte.	Edward G. Daynes	1st Bn., Yorkshire Regiment	16 Jan. 1917	Hollybrook Memorial
St2C	Frederick T. Royal	HMS Pembroke II	23 Oct. 1918	Woodlands Cemetery
Tel.	Allen J. Cory	HMS Queen Mary	31 May 1916	Chatham Naval Memorial

The following names were added following the Second World War:

Rank	Name	Unit	Date of death	Burial/Commemoration
2Lt.	William P. Harvey MiD	Malay States Volunteer Force	18 Sep. 1942	Kranji War Memorial
FSgt.	Malcolm Lewin	No. 172 (Coastal) Squadron RAF	27 Jun. 1944	Runnymede Memorial
LCpl.	John T. Skitmore	Royal Corps of Signals att. 3 Div.	17 Oct. 1944	Mook War Cemetery
Dvr.	Stanley J. Howard	560 Coy., Royal Engineers	21 Aug. 1943	Kanchanaburi War Cemetery
Pte.	Arthur N. Luff	6th Bn., Royal Norfolk Regiment	10 Jun. 1943	Kanchanaburi War Cemetery

== Gallery ==
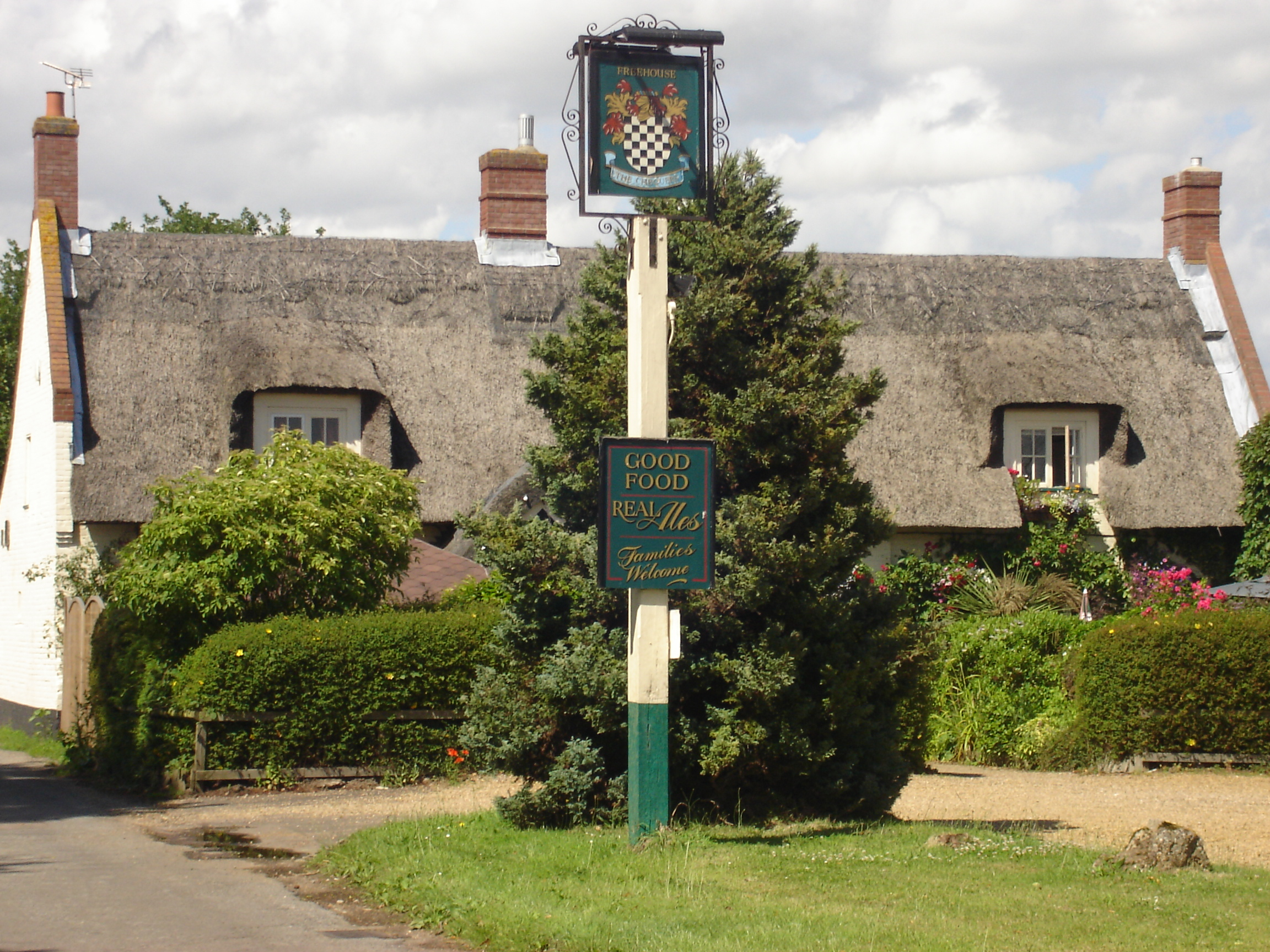
The Chequers village pub

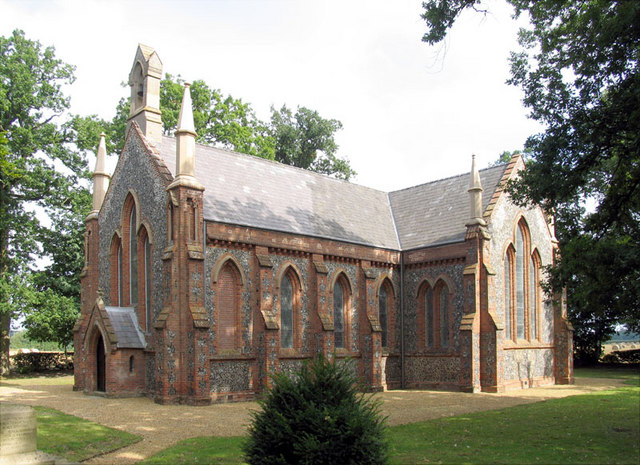
Parish church of All Saints
