= Swannington, Norfolk =

Village in Norfolk, England

Coordinates: 52.72884°N 1.15929°E

Swannington
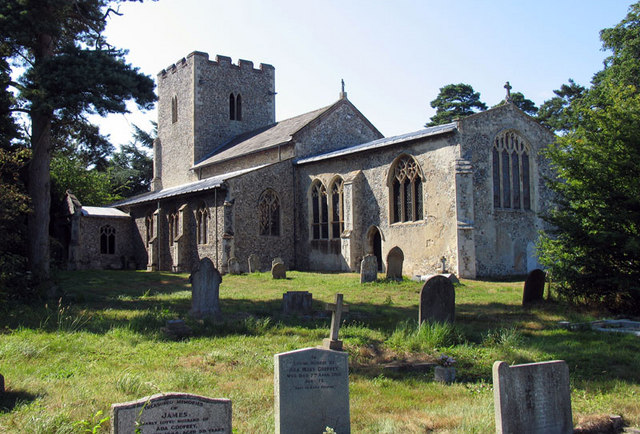
- St Margaret's Church, Swannington

- Location within Norfolk
- Area: 5.90 km^{2} (2.28 sq mi)
- Population: 366 (2011)
  - Density: 62/km^{2} (160/sq mi)
- OS grid reference: TG134192
- Civil parish: Swannington
- District: Broadland
- Shire county: Norfolk
- Region: East
- Country: England
- Sovereign state: United Kingdom
- Post town: NORWICH
- Postcode district: NR9
- Police: Norfolk
- Fire: Norfolk
- Ambulance: East of England

Swannington is a village and civil parish in the English county of Norfolk, United Kingdom.

The villages name means 'Farm/settlement connected with Swan'.

== Location ==
The village is located approximately 9 miles (14 km) north-west of Norwich between the villages of Taverham, Felthorpe, Brandiston and Cawston. It covers an area of 5.90 km^{2} (2.28 sq mi).

== Population ==
Swannington had a population of 287 in 120 households at the 2001 census, including Alderford and increasing to a population of 366 in 149 households at the 2011 Census. For the purposes of local government, it falls within the district of Broadland.

== Buildings and amenities ==
As it is a very small village it has very few amenities. There is a farm butchery and garden centre/nursery. The parish church and children's play area complete the facilities.

The parish church of St Margaret has a massive west tower and an extension, built in 1980, on the north side. Features of interest include the 15th-century chancel roof, the stained glass of the east window, the Purbeck marble font and a Norman pillar piscina.

== Tourism ==
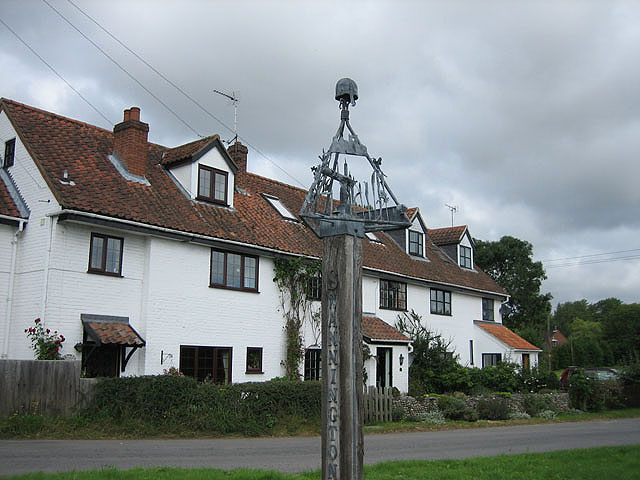
A large house by the Swannington village sign

Visitors to the village may be confused by the split nature of the village, some may first arrive in Swannington (Upgate), a collection of larger houses around Upgate Common, but this is separated from the main village by a short stretch of farmland. Swannington itself is spread around a village green split by a small stream (or beck) on which can be found a former pump and the recent addition of a contemporary village sign.

The village holds an open gardens event every two years. Both are well attended and raise money for the church.

The village is crossed by the Norwich Fringe Project footpaths and is within easy reach of Marriott's Way, a path on the former railway line running from Aylsham to Norwich.

RAF Swannington, a World War II airfield, now dismantled, was constructed to the north of the village.

== Notes ==
http://kepn.nottingham.ac.uk/map/place/Norfolk/Swannington
