= Marsham, Norfolk =

Village in Norfolk, England

Coordinates: 52.76909°N 1.25481°E

Marsham
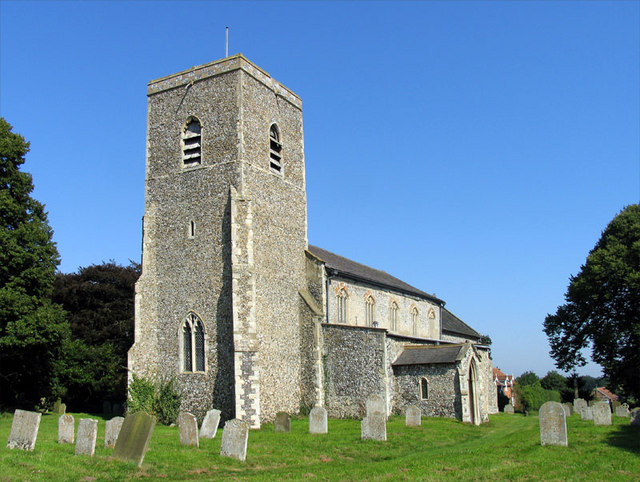
- All Saints, Marsham

- Location within Norfolk
- Area: 7.40 km^{2} (2.86 sq mi)
- Population: 674
  - Density: 91/km^{2} (240/sq mi)
- OS grid reference: TG196240
- Civil parish: Marsham
- District: Broadland
- Shire county: Norfolk
- Region: East
- Country: England
- Sovereign state: United Kingdom
- Post town: NORWICH
- Postcode district: NR10
- Police: Norfolk
- Fire: Norfolk
- Ambulance: East of England

Marsham is a village and civil parish in the English county of Norfolk, about 10 miles (16 km) north of Norwich. It covers an area of 7.40 km^{2} (2.86 sq mi) and had a population of 674 in 282 households at the 2001 census.

For local government purposes, it falls within the district of Broadland. Marsham has its own Parish Council, Marsham Parish Council.

== History ==
The Imperial Gazetteer of England and Wales (1870–1872) described Marsham thus:

MARSHAM, a village and a parish in Aylsham district, Norfolk. The village stands near the river Bure, 2 miles S of Aylsham, and 11 N of Norwich r. station; and gives the title of Viscount to Earl Romney. The parish comprises 1,819 acres. Real property, £2,314. Pop., 622. Houses, 148. The property is subdivided. Bolwick Hall is the seat of J. H. Warnes, Esq. The ancestors of Earl Romney resided in the parish in the 12th century. The living is a rectory in the diocese of Norwich. Value, £281. Patrons, Miss C. Blake and the Rev. E. T. Yates. The church consists of nave and chancel, with a tower; and contains an ancient screen, a carved font, and monuments of the Norrises and others. There are a Primitive Methodist chapel, and charities £18.

== Gallery ==
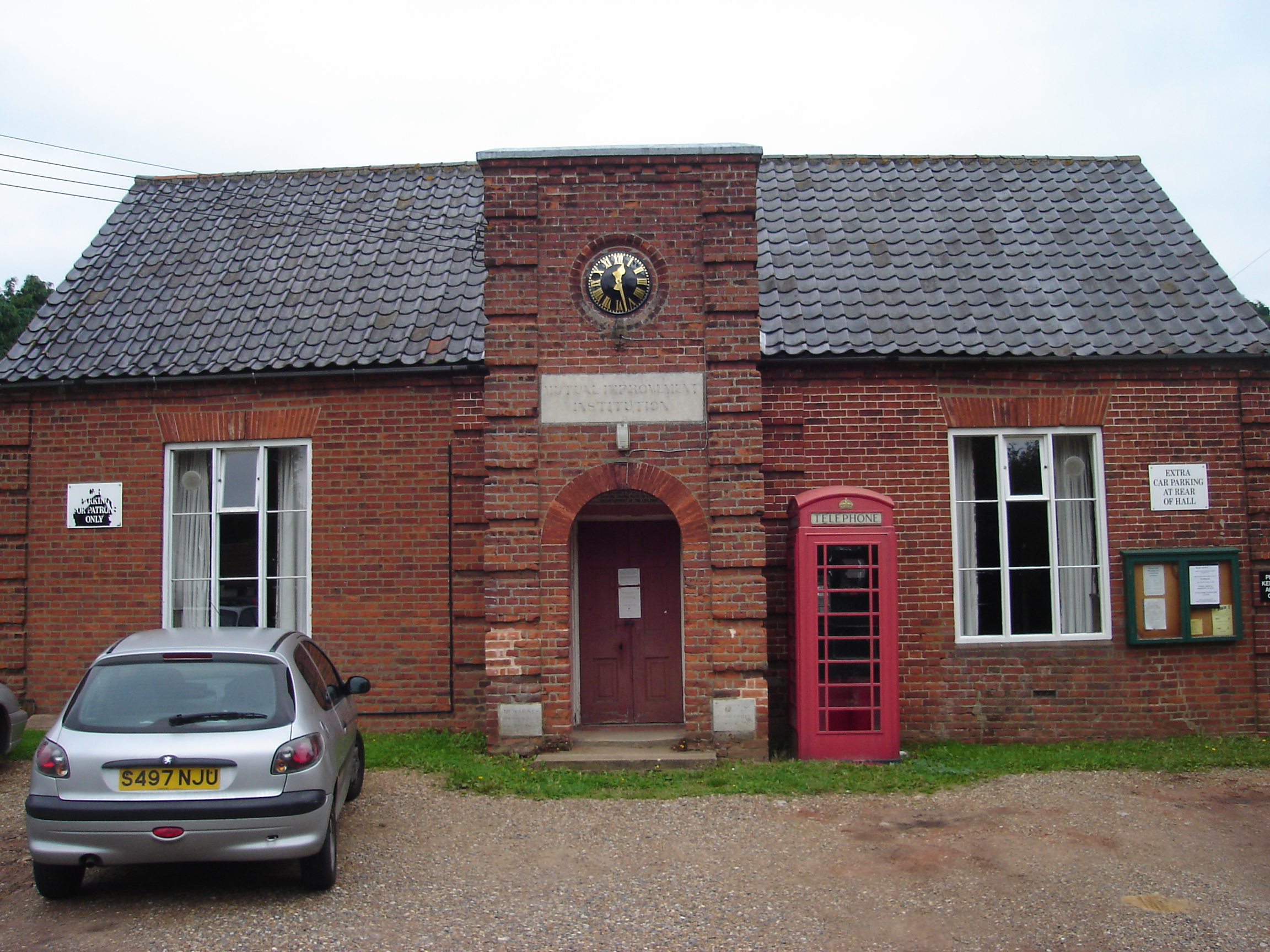
The Mutual Improvement Institution is a Grade II listed building dating back to 1857.

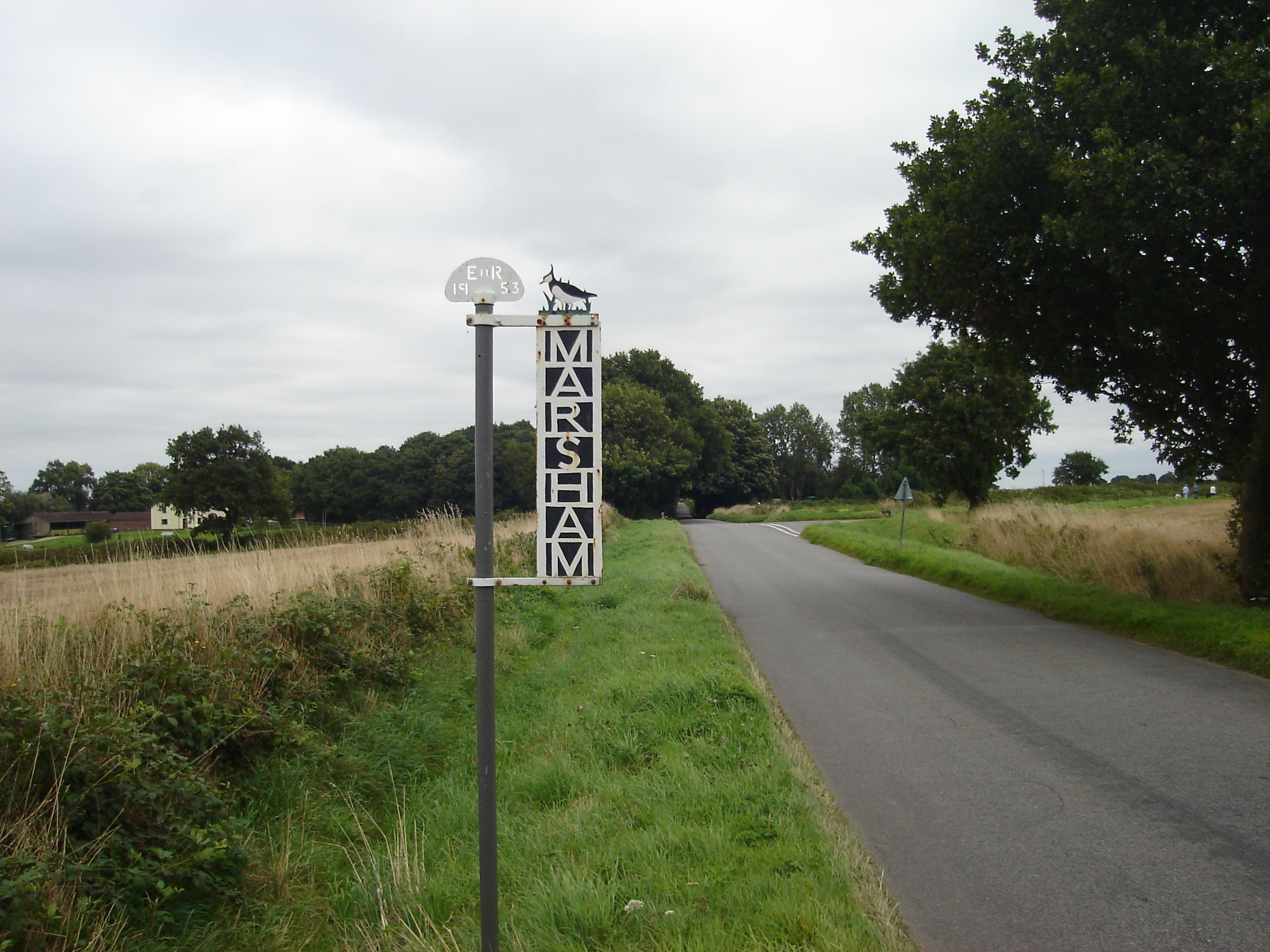
The village sign was erected in 1953 to commemorate the coronation of Queen Elizabeth II.

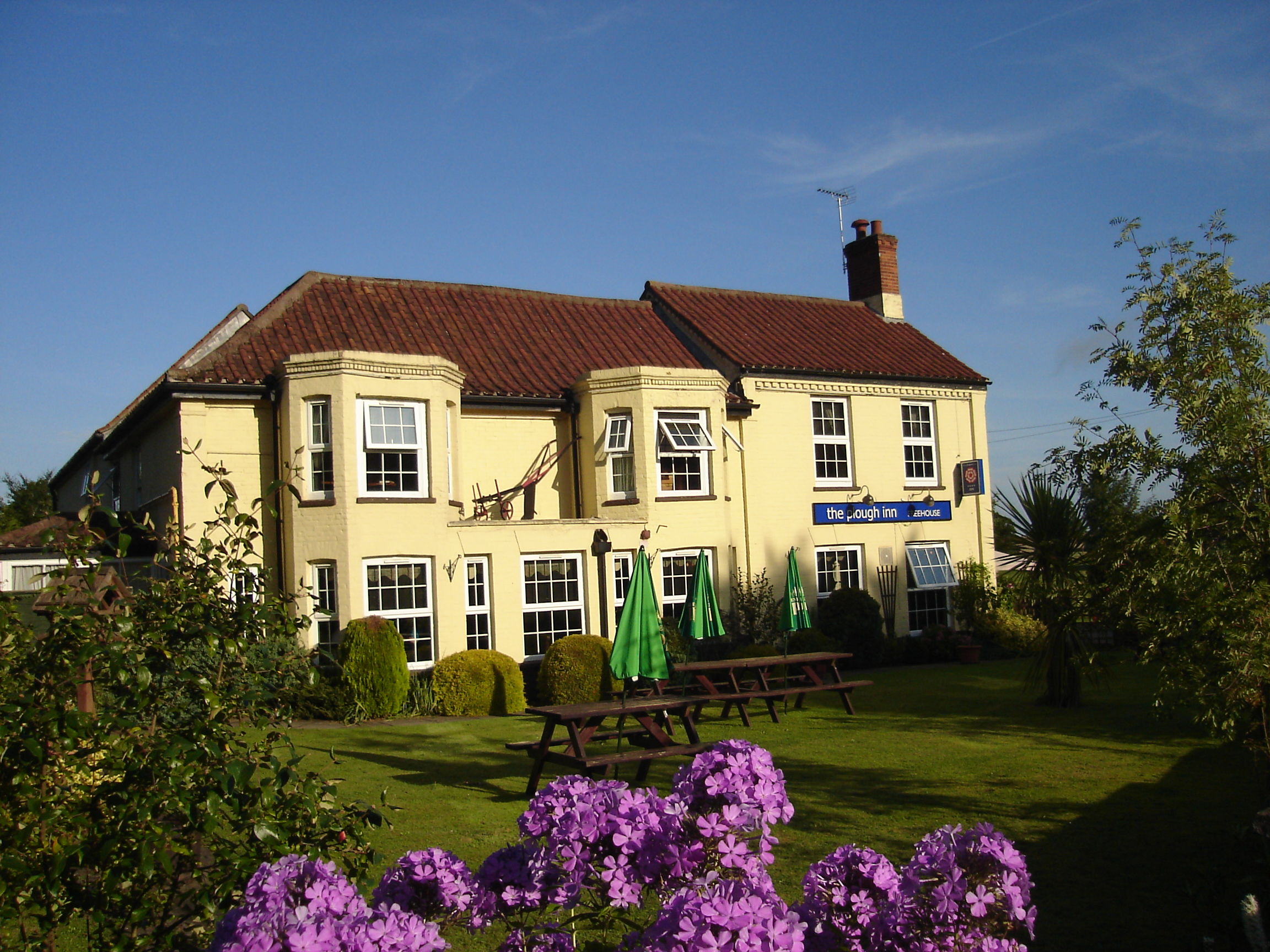
The Plough Inn Marsham

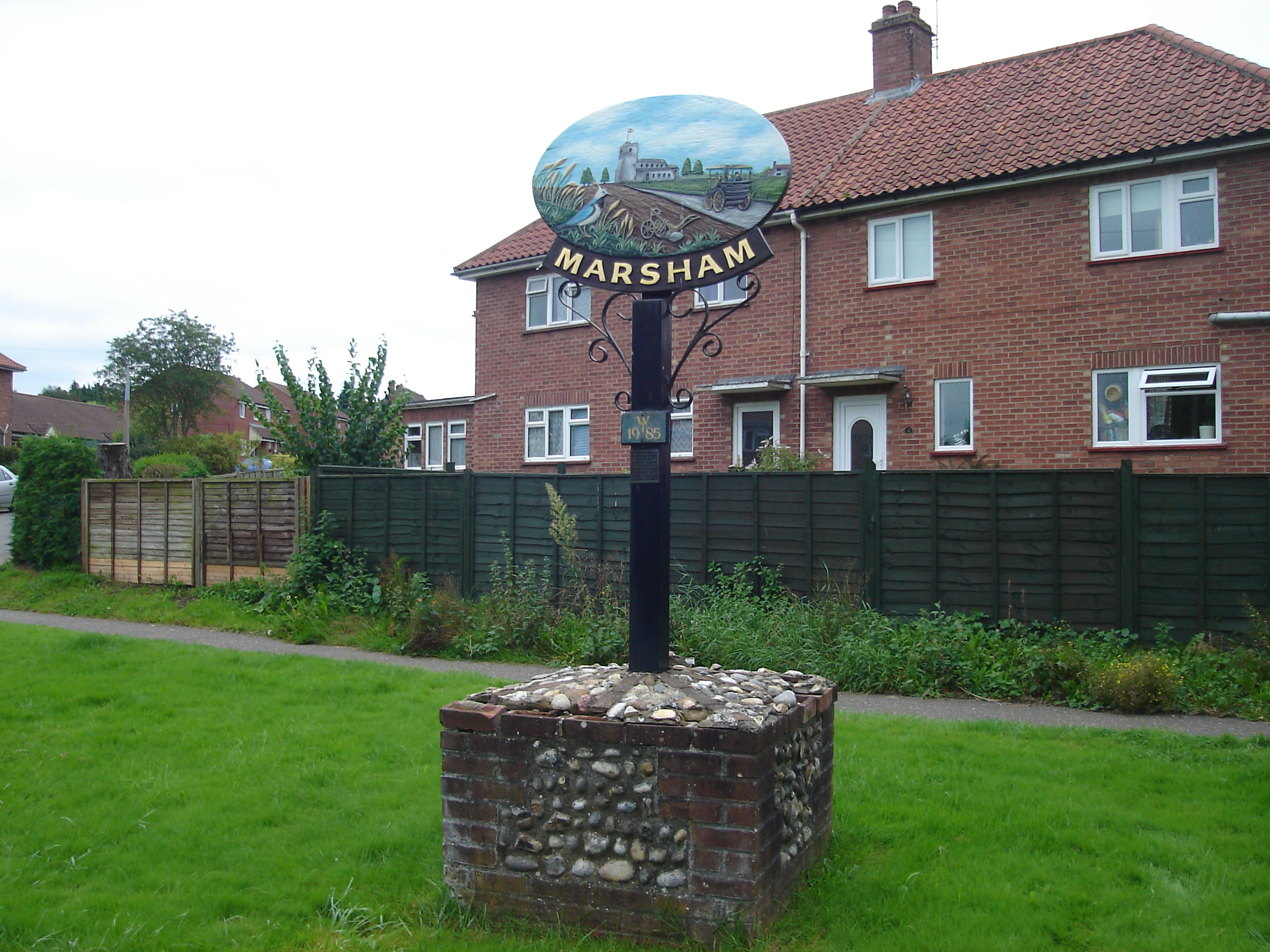
The village sign depicts the peewit bird
