= Morton on the Hill =

Village in Norfolk, England

Coordinates: 52.71026°N 1.13934°E

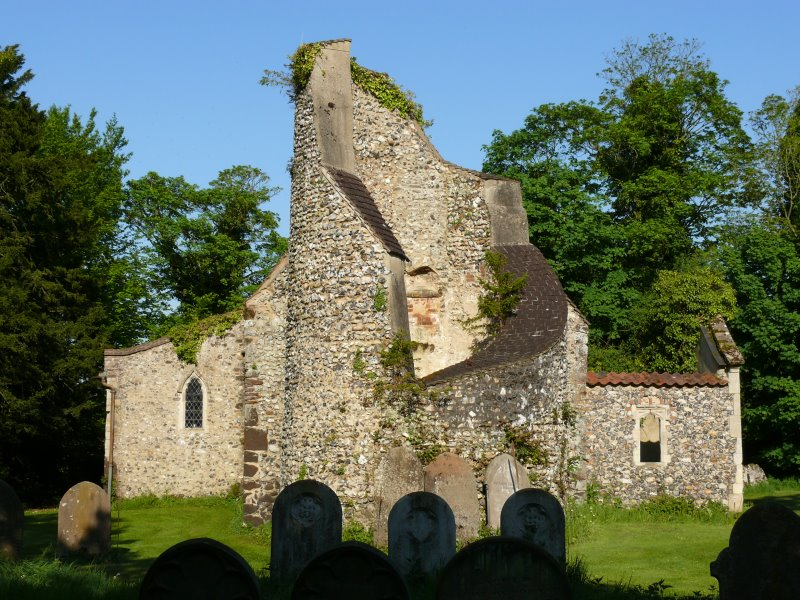
- St Margaret's church

- Location within Norfolk
- Area: 4.09 km^{2} (1.58 sq mi)
- Population: 85
  - Density: 21/km^{2} (54/sq mi)
- OS grid reference: TG121171
- Civil parish: Morton on the Hill
- District: Broadland
- Shire county: Norfolk
- Region: East
- Country: England
- Sovereign state: United Kingdom
- Post town: NORWICH
- Postcode district: NR9
- Police: Norfolk
- Fire: Norfolk
- Ambulance: East of England

Morton on the Hill is a small but scattered village and civil parish in the English county of Norfolk, about 8 miles (13 km) north-west of Norwich. The parish covers an area of 4.09 km^{2} (1.58 sq mi) and had a population of 85 in 34 households at the 2001 census. For the purposes of local government, it falls within the district of Broadland.

The village's name means 'Moor farm/settlement'.

Its church, St Margaret, is one of 124 existing round-tower churches in Norfolk. The round tower is partly in ruins.
