= Burgh and Tuttington =

Civil parish in Norfolk, England

Coordinates: 52.787°N 1.298°E

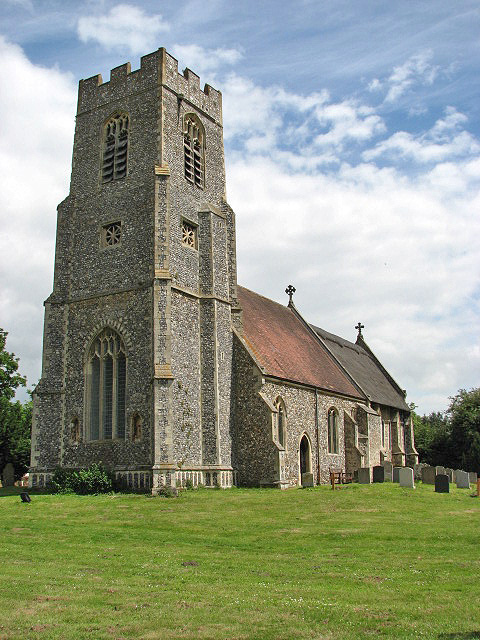
- St Mary at Burgh next Aylsham

- Location within Norfolk
- Area: 6.70 km^{2} (2.59 sq mi)
- Population: 322 (2011)
  - Density: 48/km^{2} (120/sq mi)
- OS grid reference: TG224262
- Civil parish: Burgh and Tuttington
- District: Broadland
- Shire county: Norfolk
- Region: East
- Country: England
- Sovereign state: United Kingdom
- Post town: NORWICH
- Postcode district: NR11
- Police: Norfolk
- Fire: Norfolk
- Ambulance: East of England

Burgh and Tuttington is a civil parish in the English county of Norfolk. It includes the villages of Burgh-next-Aylsham and Tuttington, both of which were separate parishes until they were combined in 1935. The parish is 2 miles (3.2 km) east of the town of Aylsham and 10 miles (16 km) north of Norwich.

The parish covers an area of 6.70 km^{2} (2.59 sq mi) and had a population of 255 in 115 households at the 2001 census, increasing to a population of 322 in 140 households at the 2011 Census. For the purposes of local government, it falls within the district of Broadland.

Burgh-next-Aylsham has a Grade I listed church dedicated to Mary, which features a notable fifteenth-century baptismal font. The church was restored in the late nineteenth century by Richard Phipson. Tuttington church is dedicated to St Peter and Paul is a grade II* listed building.

== Burgh Mill ==
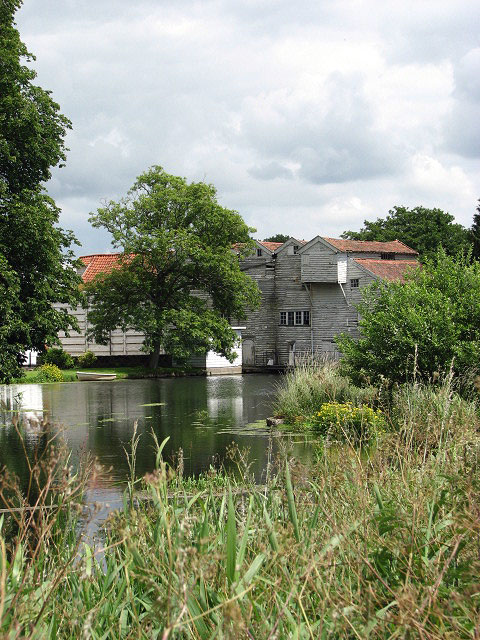
Burgh Watermill

Burgh Mill is a large Grade II* listed water mill dating from the early 18th century, greatly enlarged in the late 18th century and early 19th century. The basic machinery is probably early 19th century. It is built in three storeys with an attic from a clapboarded timber frame with some colour-washed brick to lower storey and internally. The roofs are pantile and some corrugated iron.
