= Belaugh =

Village that occupies a bend in the River Bure in Norfolk, England

Coordinates: 52.716°N 1.387°E

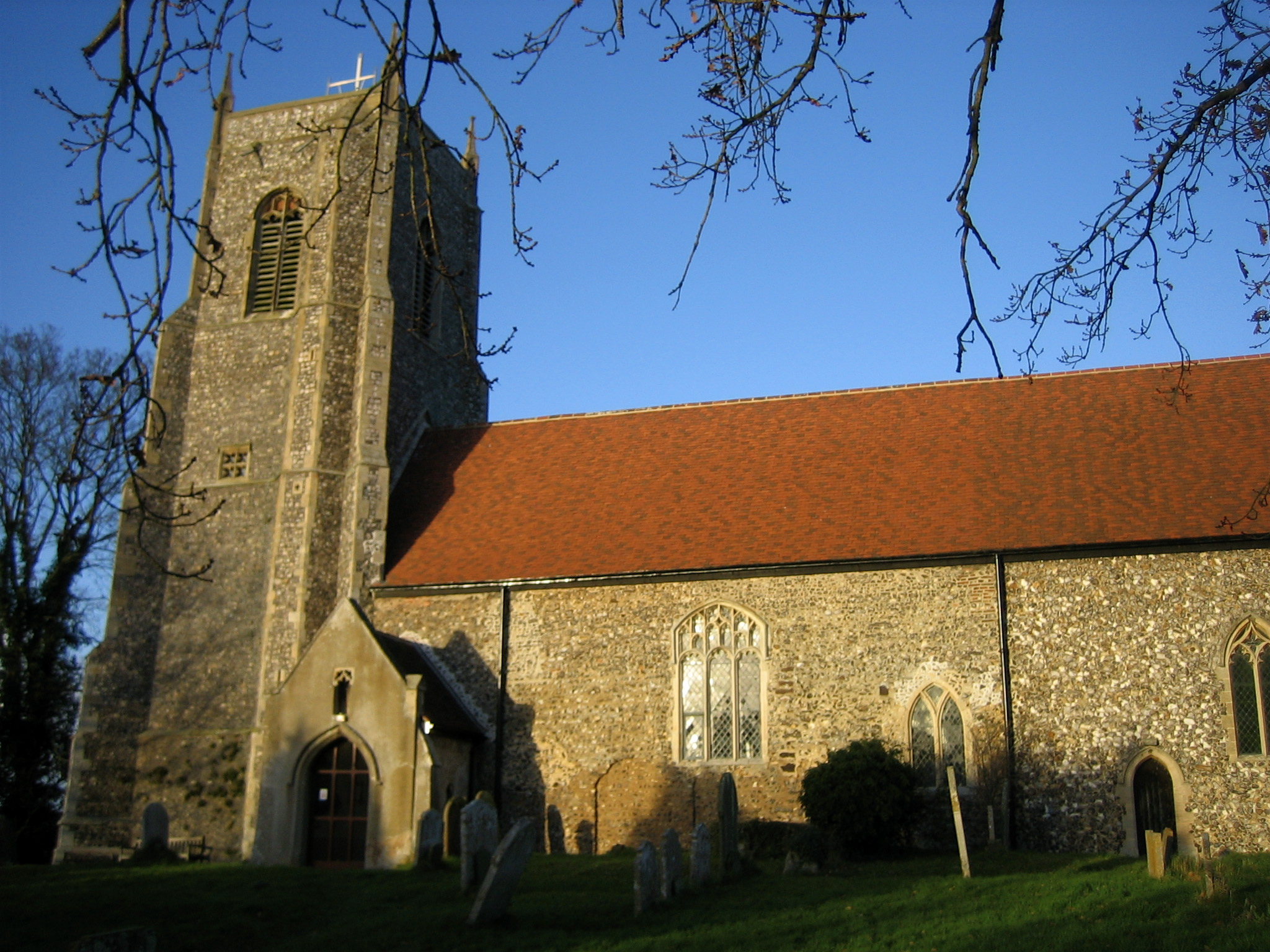
- St Peter's church

- Location within Norfolk
- Area: 3.56 km^{2} (1.37 sq mi)
- Population: 134 (2011)
  - Density: 38/km^{2} (98/sq mi)
- District: Broadland
- Shire county: Norfolk
- Region: East
- Country: England
- Sovereign state: United Kingdom
- Post town: NORWICH
- Postcode district: NR12
- Dialling code: 01603
- Police: Norfolk
- Fire: Norfolk
- Ambulance: East of England

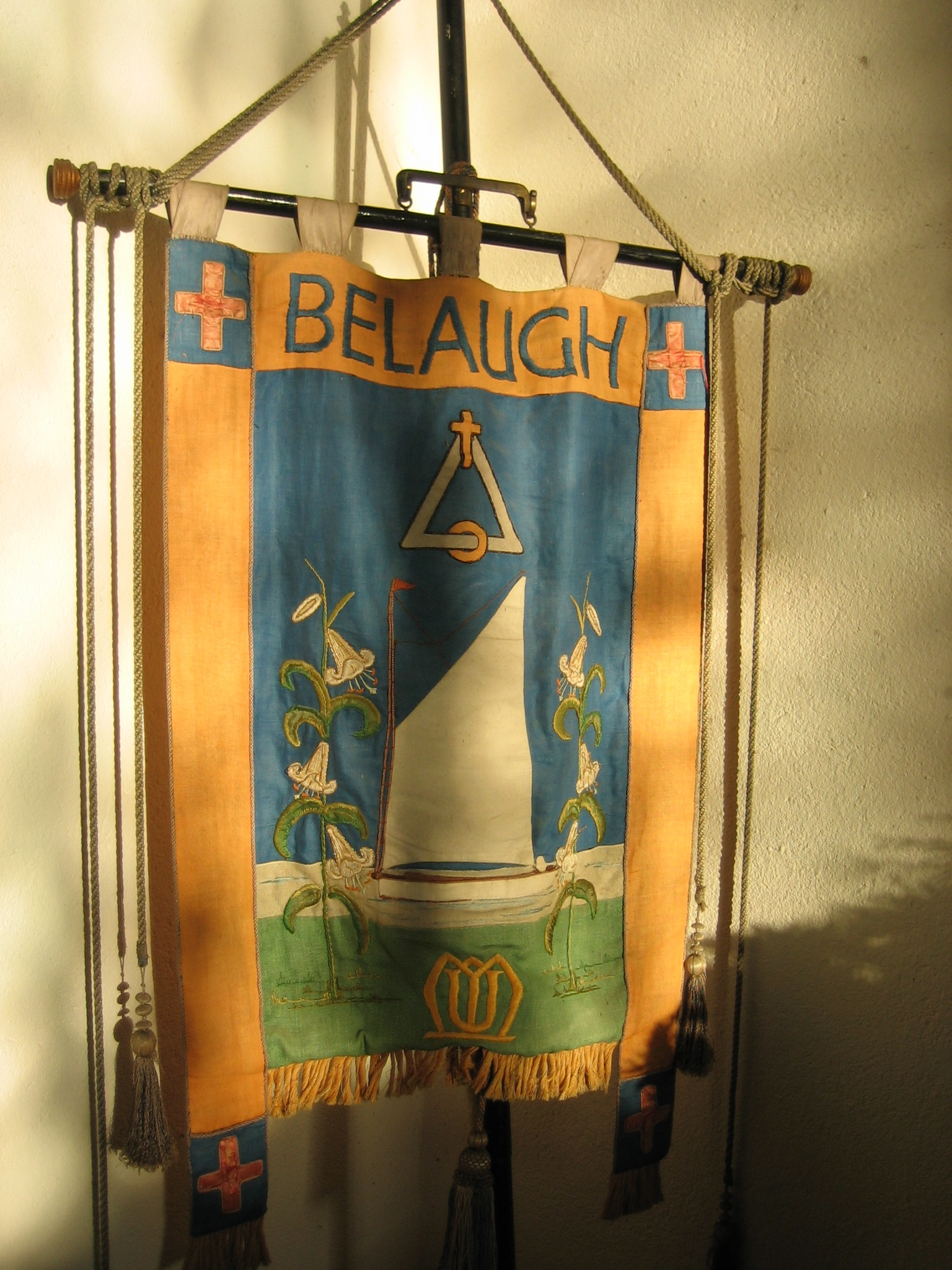

Belaugh is a small village on the River Bure in Norfolk, England. The village is within The Broads National Park and is accessible by road from Hoveton and Coltishall. Most of the land around Belaugh - about 850 acres (344 ha) - is owned by the Trafford family, who are Lords of the Manor.

== History ==
The Domesday Book of 1086 contains one of the earliest recorded mentions of the village, at the time known as Belaga. Other records from around the time name it as Belihagh, Belaw, Bilhagh or Bilough, names based on combinations of Norse, Danish and Anglo-Saxon words that collectively mean 'a dwelling place by the water'.

The derelict tower of a drainage windmill survives by the River Bure at Old Hall.

== Belaugh St Peter ==
Belaugh St Peter is a Church of England church located at the top of a steep slope above the village. It was built in the 14th century and contains an ornate rood screen decorated with images of the apostles from the early 16th century. In the 17th century a Parliamentarian soldier scraped away the faces of the apostles. The font of the church is shaped in the Norman style as a cauldron made of a blue stone. The church organ was built between 1886 and 1904 by the Reverend George Buck, who was rector between 1880 and 1907 and son of Dr Zephaniah Buck, organist of Norwich Cathedral. George Buck also built church organs for Edingthorpe and Little Melton.

John Betjeman stated that it was the view of St Peter's from the river that began his lifelong passion for churches.

== Environmental incidents ==
In 2023, raw sewage was pumped into the River Bure at Belaugh for around 2,000 hours. This was caused by a storm overflow, designed to prevent blockages in sewer systems by releasing sewage into bodies of water during periods of heavy rainfall. The surge in sewage outflows at Belaugh nearly tripled compared to the preceding year, marking it as the most severely impacted locale in the region.
