= Alderford =

Village in Norfolk, England

Coordinates: 52.726°N 1.143°E

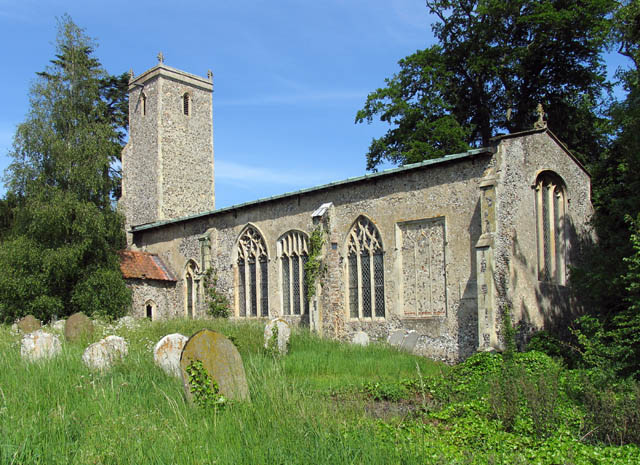
- St John the Baptist, Alderford

- Location within Norfolk
- Area: 1.80 km^{2} (0.69 sq mi)
- OS grid reference: TG123188
- District: Broadland
- Shire county: Norfolk
- Region: East
- Country: England
- Sovereign state: United Kingdom
- Post town: NORWICH
- Postcode district: NR9
- Dialling code: 01603
- Police: Norfolk
- Fire: Norfolk
- Ambulance: East of England
- UK Parliament: Broadland and Fakenham

Alderford is a village and civil parish in the English county of Norfolk, about 10 miles (16 km) north-west of Norwich.

The civil parish has an area of 1.80 square kilometres (0.69 sq mi) and in 2001 had a population of 43 in 16 households. At the 2011 Census the population remained less than 100 and is included in the civil parish of Swannington. For the purposes of local government, the parish falls within the area of the district of Broadland.
