= Broadland =

District in Norfolk, England

Coordinates: 52°38′1.25″N 1°21′8.46″E

Broadland District
- Non-metropolitan district
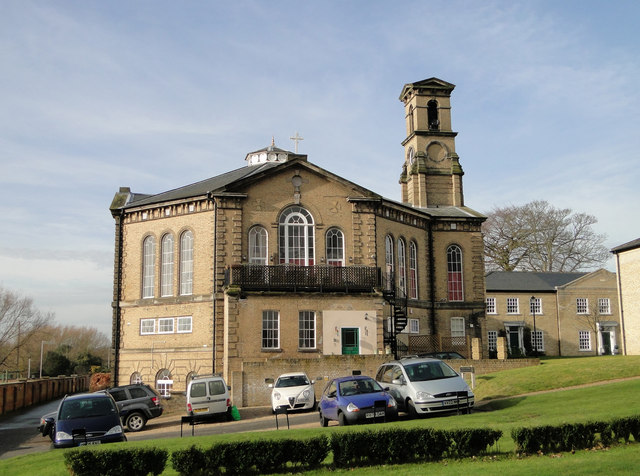
- Thorpe St Andrew

- Broadland shown within Norfolk
- Sovereign state: United Kingdom
- Constituent country: England
- Region: East of England
- Non-metropolitan county: Norfolk
- Status: Non-metropolitan district
- Incorporated: 1 April 1974

Government
  - Type: Non-metropolitan district council
  - Body: Broadland District Council
  - MPs: Jerome Mayhew, Alice Macdonald

Area
  - Total: 213.3 sq mi (552.4 km^{2})
  - Rank: 70th (of 296)

Population (2024)
  - Total: 138,157
  - Rank: 176th (of 296)
  - Density: 647.8/sq mi (250.1/km^{2})

Ethnicity (2021)
  - Ethnic groups: List: 96.3% White; 1.4% Asian; 1.4% Mixed; 0.5% Black; 0.4% other

Religion (2021)
  - Religion: List: 47.7% Christianity; 44.5% No religion; 7.3% other; 0.5% Islam
- Time zone: UTC0 (GMT)
  - Summer (DST): UTC+1 (BST)
- ONS code: 33UC (ONS); E07000144 (GSS)
- OS grid reference: TG2682109307

Broadland is a local government district in Norfolk, England. It was named after the Norfolk Broads, which includes some eastern parts of the district. Its council is based at the Broadland Business Park on the outskirts of Norwich. The district includes the towns of Acle, Aylsham, Reepham, Sprowston and Thorpe St Andrew. Several of the district's settlements (Note: These include Sprowston and Thorpe St Andrew.) form part of the Norwich built-up area, lying outside the city's boundaries to the north-west and north-east. The district also includes numerous villages and surrounding rural areas.

The neighbouring districts are North Norfolk, Great Yarmouth, South Norfolk, Norwich and Breckland. In 2013, Broadland was ranked as the most peaceful locality within the United Kingdom, having the lowest level of violent crime in the country.

== History ==
The district was created on 1 April 1974 under the Local Government Act 1972, covering the whole of one former district and parts of another, which were both abolished at the same time:

- Blofield and Flegg Rural District: including parishes lying generally south-west of the River Bure; the rest went to Great Yarmouth (Note: Except a small detached part of the district containing Shirehall, which went to Norwich.)
- St Faith's and Aylsham Rural District.

The new district was named Broadland after the Broads.

The council appointed a shared managing director with neighbouring South Norfolk council in 2018. The two councils' staff were merged in 2020 and they moved to a new shared building in 2023.

In March 2026, the government announced plans to abolish the district in 2028 as part of local government reorganisation across Norfolk. These proposals were withdrawn in September 2026.

== Governance ==
Broadland District Council

Type
- Type: Non-metropolitan district

Leadership
- Chair: Adrian Tipple, Labour since 21 May 2026
- Leader: Sue Holland, Liberal Democrat since 25 May 2023
- Managing Director: Trevor Holden since 2019

Structure
- Seats: 47 councillors
- Political groups: Administration (25) Liberal Democrats (14) Labour (7) Green (4) Other parties (22) Conservative (19) Reform UK (1) Independent (2)

Elections
- Last election: 4 May 2023
- Next election: 6 May 2027

Meeting place
- The Horizon Centre, Broadland Business Park, Peachman Way, Norwich, NR7 0WF

Website
- www.southnorfolkandbroadland.gov.uk

Broadland District Council provides district-level services. County-level services are provided by Norfolk County Council. The whole district is also covered by civil parishes, which form a third tier of local government.

In the parts of the district within The Broads, town planning is the responsibility of the Broads Authority. The district council appoints one of its councillors to sit on that authority.

=== Political control ===
The council has been under no overall control since the 2023 elections, being run by a coalition of the Liberal Democrats, Labour, and Greens, led by Liberal Democrat councillor Sue Holland.

The first election to the council was held in 1973, initially operating as a shadow authority alongside the outgoing authorities until the new arrangements took effect on 1 April 1974. Political control of the council since 1974 has been as follows: (Note: Put "Broadland" in search box to see specific results.)

| Party in control | Years |
|---|---|
| No overall control | 1974–1976 |
| Conservative | 1976–1994 |
| No overall control | 1994–1999 |
| Conservative | 1999–2023 |
| No overall control | 2023–present |

=== Leadership ===
The leaders of the council since c. 2001 have been:

| Councillor | Party | From | To |
|---|---|---|---|
| Simon Woodbridge | Conservative | c. 2001 | May 2011 |
| Andrew Proctor | Conservative | 19 May 2011 | Jul 2018 |
| Shaun Vincent | Conservative | 12 Jul 2018 | May 2023 |
| Sue Holland | Liberal Democrats | 25 May 2023 | |

=== Composition ===
Following the 2023 election, and subsequent by-elections and changes of allegiance up to July 2026, the composition of the council was:

| Party | Councillors |
|---|---|
| Conservative | 19 |
| Liberal Democrats | 14 |
| Labour | 7 |
| Green | 4 |
| Reform | 1 |
| Independent | 2 |
| Total | 47 |

=== Elections ===
Since the last full review of boundaries in 2004 the council has comprised 47 councillors representing 27 wards, with each ward electing one, two or three councillors. Elections are held every four years.

=== UK Youth Parliament ===
Although the UK Youth Parliament is an apolitical organisation, the elections are run in a way similar to that of the local elections. The votes come from 11 to 18-year olds, and are combined to make the decision of the next two-year Member of Youth Parliament. The elections are run at different times across the country, with Broadland's typically being biannually in early spring.

Due to the large scale nature of Broadland's and its bordering with all other districts, the district is represented by all four MYPs for Norfolk for ease and true representation.

=== Premises ===
In 2023, the council moved to the Horizon Centre, a modern office building at the Broadland Business Park on the outskirts of Norwich. (Note: It lies in the parish of Postwick with Witton.) It shares the building with South Norfolk Council, as part of their joint management and staff arrangement.

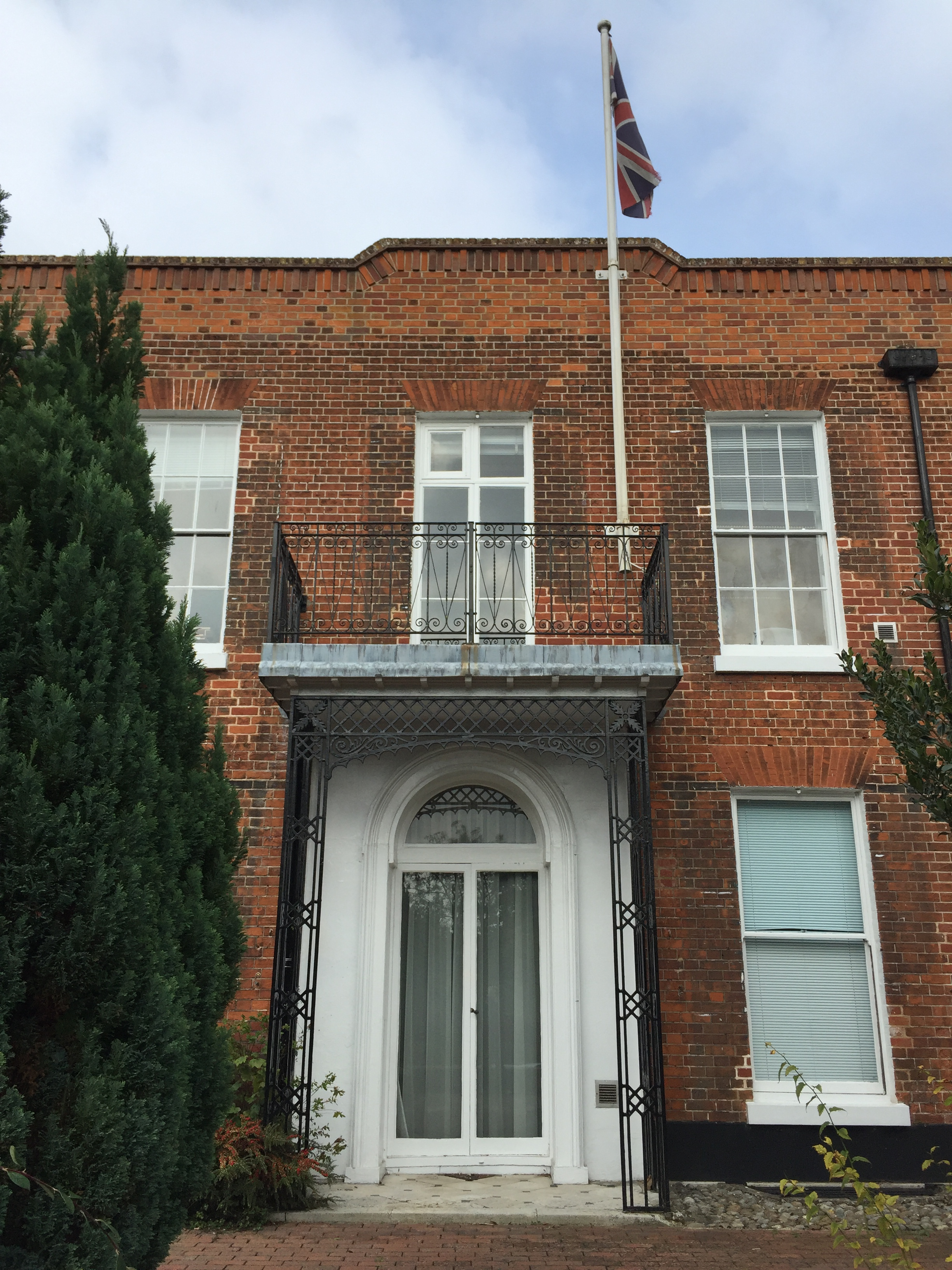
Thorpe Lodge: Council's headquarters until 2023.

Prior to 2023, the council was based at Thorpe Lodge at 1 Yarmouth Road in Thorpe St Andrew, a converted 1820s house with substantial 1970s extensions.

== Towns and parishes ==
The district is divided into 65 civil parishes. The parish councils for Aylsham, Reepham, Sprowston and Thorpe St Andrew have declared their parishes to be towns, allowing them to take the style of town council. Some of the smaller parishes have a parish meeting rather than a parish council. The three most populous parishes at the 2021 census were Sprowston, Thorpe St Andrew and Hellesdon, all of which form part of the Norwich built-up area.

The district contains the following civil parishes:

- Acle, Alderford, Attlebridge, Aylsham
- Beeston St. Andrew, Beighton, Belaugh, Blickling, Blofield, Booton, Brampton, Brandiston, Brundall, Burgh and Tuttington, Buxton Lammas, Buxton
- Cantley, Cawston, Coltishall, Crostwick
- Drayton
- Felthorpe, Foulsham, Freethorpe, Frettenham
- Great Plumstead, Great Witchingham, Guestwick
- Hainford, Halvergate, Haveringland, Hellesdon, Hemblington, Hevingham, Heydon, Honingham, Horsford, Horsham St Faith, Horsham St Faith and Newton St Faith, Horstead with Stanninghall
- Lingwood and Burlingham, Little Plumstead, Little Witchingham
- Marsham, Morton on the Hill
- Old Catton, Oulton
- Postwick with Witton
- Rackheath, Reedham, Reepham, Ringland
- Salhouse, Salle, South Walsham, Spixworth, Sprowston, Stratton Strawless, Strumpshaw, Swannington
- Taverham, Themelthorpe, Thorpe St Andrew
- Upton with Fishley
- Weston Longville, Woodbastwick, Wood Dalling, Wroxham.

== Climate ==
Climate in this area has mild differences between highs and lows, and there is adequate rainfall year-round. The Köppen Climate Classification subtype for this climate is "Cfb". (Marine West Coast Climate/Oceanic climate).

Climate data for Broadland, England
| Month | Jan | Feb | Mar | Apr | May | Jun | Jul | Aug | Sep | Oct | Nov | Dec | Year |
|---|---|---|---|---|---|---|---|---|---|---|---|---|---|
| Mean daily maximum °C (°F) | 7 (45) | 8 (46) | 10 (50) | 13 (55) | 16 (61) | 19 (66) | 21 (70) | 22 (72) | 19 (66) | 15 (59) | 10 (50) | 7 (44) | 14 (57) |
| Mean daily minimum °C (°F) | 1 (34) | 1 (34) | 2 (36) | 3 (37) | 6 (43) | 9 (48) | 11 (52) | 11 (52) | 9 (48) | 5 (41) | 2 (36) | 1 (34) | 5 (41) |
| Average precipitation mm (inches) | 48 (1.9) | 43 (1.7) | 43 (1.7) | 43 (1.7) | 41 (1.6) | 61 (2.4) | 53 (2.1) | 61 (2.4) | 64 (2.5) | 69 (2.7) | 74 (2.9) | 66 (2.6) | 670 (26.2) |
Source: Weatherbase

== Controversies ==
A total of £357,000 was paid to two managers leaving Broadland council as a result of the merger of two management teams at Broadland and South Norfolk councils, in October 2020. (Note: A further £594,000 in termination payments was to be shared between three managers leaving South Norfolk Council, due to the merger.) The councils reportedly claimed these so-called "golden goodbyes" would actually save money, as they would have fewer highly paid senior officials after they departed.

== Arms ==
Coat of arms of Broadland

Notes
Granted 16 January 1979 by the College of Arms.
Crest
On a wreath of the colour a mount Vert thereon a griffin sejant Or the body and underside of the wing each charged with three fleurs-de-lys Azure resting the dexter foreleg on a mitre affronty Or.
Escutcheon
Azure in chief two Broadland Sailing Cruisers and on a mount issuant in base a Norfolk Drainage Mill all Proper on a chief wavy Or between two ostrich feathers Ermine the quill of each piercing a scroll Argent a dexter arm embowed in a maunch Gules the hand Proper grasping a rose Gules barbed seeded and slipped Proper.
Motto
God Keep Our Broad Land
Badge
On a roundel Azure fimbriated Or issuant therefrom six fleurs-de-lys Azure a Broadland Sailing Cruiser as in the arms.

== See also ==
- Listed buildings in Broadland District
