= Beeston St Andrew =

Civil parish north of Norwich in the Broadland district of Norfolk, England

Coordinates: 52.678°N 1.337°E

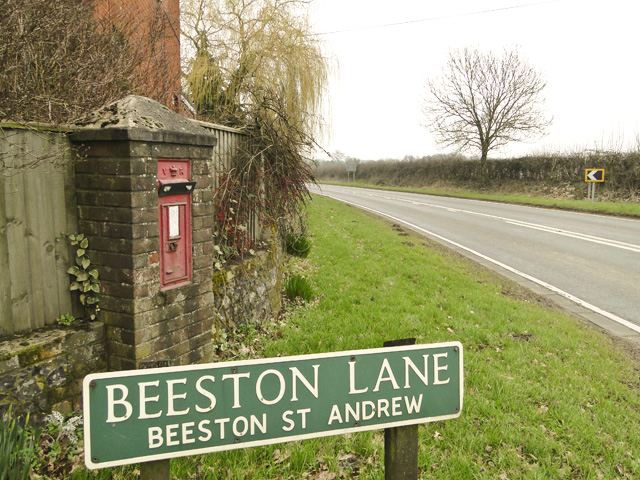

- Location within Norfolk
- Area: 2.56 km^{2} (0.99 sq mi)
- Civil parish: Beeston St. Andrew
- District: Broadland
- Shire county: Norfolk
- Region: East
- Country: England
- Sovereign state: United Kingdom
- Post town: NORWICH
- Postcode district: NR12
- Dialling code: 01603
- Police: Norfolk
- Fire: Norfolk
- Ambulance: East of England

Beeston St Andrew is a civil parish north of Norwich in the Broadland district of Norfolk, England. It includes Beeston Park, and its population was below 100 so was included within the parish of Spixworth at the 2001 and 2011 censuses.

It is part of the ecclesiastical parish of Sprowston with Beeston St Andrew.
