= Guestwick =

Village in Norfolk, England

Coordinates: 52.801°N 1.05726°E

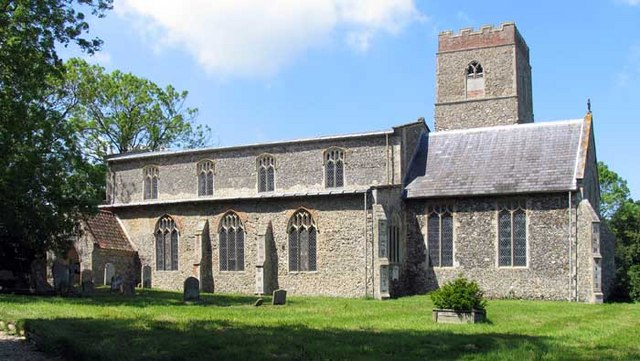
- St Peter's Church, Guestwick

- Location within Norfolk
- Area: 3.91 sq mi (10.1 km^{2})
- Population: 210 (2021 census)
  - Density: 54/sq mi (21/km^{2})
- OS grid reference: TG061269
  - London: 131 miles (211 km)
- Civil parish: Guestwick
- District: Broadland
- Shire county: Norfolk
- Region: East
- Country: England
- Sovereign state: United Kingdom
- Post town: DEREHAM
- Postcode district: NR20
- Dialling code: 01362
- Police: Norfolk
- Fire: Norfolk
- Ambulance: East of England
- UK Parliament: Broadland and Fakenham

Guestwick is a village and a civil parish in the English county of Norfolk. The civil parish also includes the hamlet of Guestwick Green.

Guestwick is located 10.2 miles (16.4 km) west of Aylsham and 18.7 miles (30.1 km) north-west of Norwich.

== History ==
Guestwick's name is of Viking origin and derives from the Old Norse for Guist's clearing.

In the Domesday Book, Guestwick is listed as a settlement of 20 households hundred of Eynesford. In 1086, the village was part of the East Anglian estates of William, Bishop of Thetford and Hagni the Reeve.

In 1652, a Congregationalist Chapel was built in the parish which was re-built in 1840 and converted into a private dwelling in the 1990s. The chapel was one of the oldest in England and the minister was once John Godwin, the father of William Godwin and grandfather of Mary Shelley.

Railway embankments and infrastructure are still visible from the old North Norfolk Railway.

== Geography ==
According to the 2021 census, Guestwick has a population of 210 people which shows an increase from the 207 recorded in the 2011 census.

== St. Peter’s Church ==
Guestwick's parish church is dedicated to Saint Peter and dates from the Twelfth Century. St. Peter's is located within the village on Church Lane and has been Grade I listed since 1961. The church is still open for Sunday services and is part of the Heart of Norfolk Churches Benefice.

St. Peter's was restored in the Victorian era but still retains its Fifteenth Century font. The church holds a good collection of Fifteenth Century stained-glass and some stained-glass wildlife installed by Adam O'Grady in 2000.

== Governance ==
Guestwick is part of the electoral ward of Eynesford for local elections and is part of the district of Broadland.

The village's national constituency is Broadland and Fakenham which has been represented by the Conservative Party's Jerome Mayhew MP since 2019.

== War Memorial ==
Guestwick's war memorial is a marble plaque inside St. Peter's Church which lists the following names for the First World War:

Rank	Name	Unit	Date of death	Burial/Commemoration
Lt.	Cubitt A. Ireland MC	6th Bn., Norfolk Regiment	14 Oct. 1917	Arras Memorial
Sgt.	Henry E. Jordan MiD	11th Bn., Essex Regiment	24 Feb. 1916	Lijssenthoek Military Cemetery
Dvr.	Ernest E. Dagless	2nd Coy., Machine Gun Corps	9 Apr. 1918	Lillers Cemetery
Pte.	Percival S. Gibbs	7th Bn., Bedfordshire Regiment	15 Mar. 1917	Achiet-le-Grand Cemetery
Pte.	Walter E. Gibbs	9th Bn., Royal Fusiliers	27 Mar. 1918	Pozières Memorial
Pte.	George F. Pearce	17th Bn., Middlesex Regiment	28 Apr. 1917	Arras Memorial
Pte.	Henry E. Broadwater	1st Bn., Queen's Royal Regt.	13 Apr. 1918	Ploegsteert Memorial
