= Stratton Strawless =

Village in Norfolk, England

Coordinates: 52.738867°N 1.289338°E

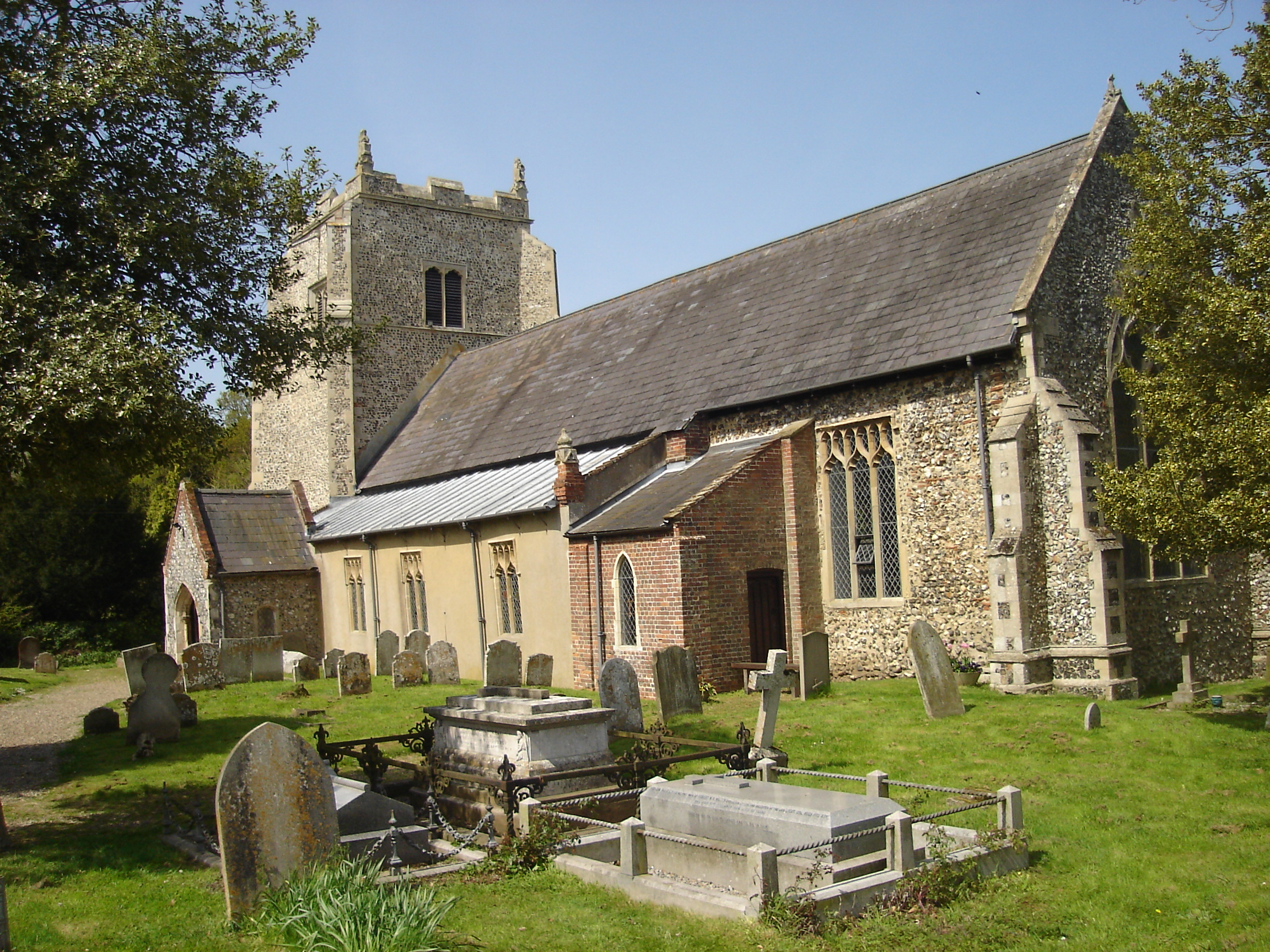
- St Margaret's Church

- Location within Norfolk
- Area: 7.14 km^{2} (2.76 sq mi)
- Population: 580 (2011)
  - Density: 81/km^{2} (210/sq mi)
- OS grid reference: TG220208
  - London: 123 miles (197.9 km)
- Civil parish: Stratton Strawless
- District: Broadland
- Shire county: Norfolk
- Region: East
- Country: England
- Sovereign state: United Kingdom
- Post town: NORWICH
- Postcode district: NR10
- Dialling code: 01603
- Police: Norfolk
- Fire: Norfolk
- Ambulance: East of England
- UK Parliament: Mid Norfolk

Stratton Strawless is a village in the county of Norfolk and district of Broadland. The civil parish covers 714 acres (289 ha) and has a population of 495, increasing to 580 in the 2011 Census. Located close and to the east of the A140 road and being 4.5 miles (7.2 km) south of the market town of Aylsham and some 7 miles (11 km) north of Norwich. Much of the parish has been given over to the growing of arable crops, but there are substantial amounts of mixed woodland to be found.

== History ==
The village was first recorded in the Domesday Book (1086) as Stratuna ('tun') meaning house or farm in Anglo-Saxon. Strawless is an appellative from the poorness of the soil, producing little grain and less straw, but favourable to the production of timber.

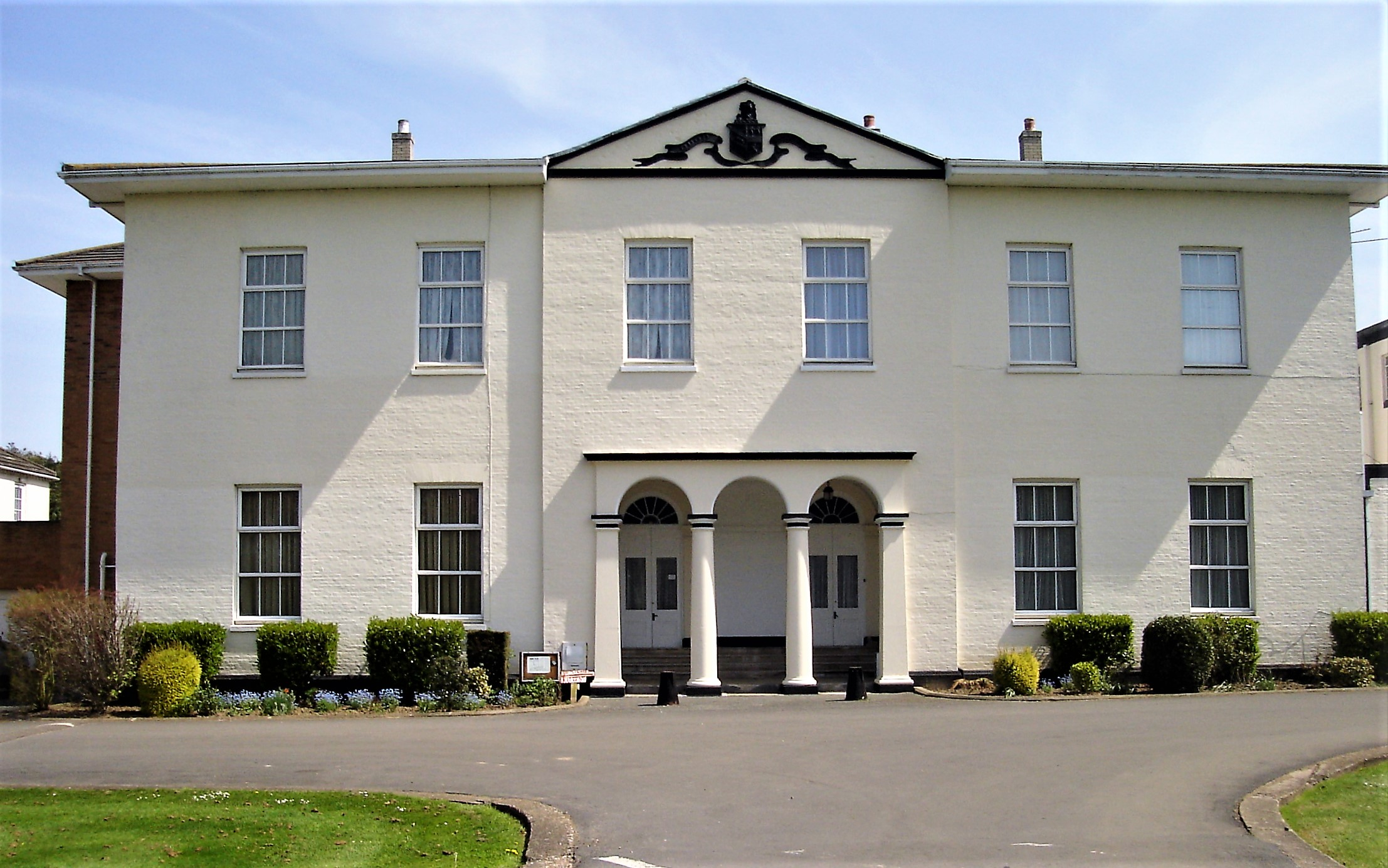
Stratton Strawless Hall

== The Marsham family ==
From the 14th century to the end of the 19th century Stratton Strawless hall was the home of the Marsham family which included Robert Marsham (1707–97), the phenologist. Marsham is believed to have planted two million trees on the estate. Most of the plantings were cleared for much-needed timber for the First and Second World War. A few ancient trees remain, and in particular the Great Cedar (planted in 1747). The Cedrus atlantica tree, which is located in Reed-house grove to the east of the hall, was measured in 2000, at which time it had attained a height of 31 metres (102 ft) and a circumference of 7 metres (23 ft).

The current hall (then three storeys) was completed c. 1800; in c.1960 the top storey was removed. During the Second World War the hall housed an operations room for RAF Coltishall. The Grade II listed hall has been converted into residential flats and part of the grounds have been turned into a caravan park.

== St Margaret's Church ==
The Grade I listed Church of St Margaret dates to the 13th century with a broad tower from 1422. The oldest feature is a Norman doorway leading to the chancel. The church is full of artefacts which include 17th-century alabaster monuments dedicated to the Marsham family.

Also, of note is the early 18th-century great brass chandelier which holds 25 candles and is lit every fourth Sunday for Evensong. The life-sized Black Abbess was found walled up in the tower during the 19th-century renovation. She is believed to depict a crusader's widow dating from the late 13th century.

== Leisure and recreation ==
The village hall is located in Parish Road. Adjacent to the building is the village sign which depicts Marsham's Great Cedar, woodlands and the lily ponds that are located close by.

In May of each year at Brook House, the bluebell woods are opened to the public.

Much of the area can be explored by bicycle and foot via the network of quiet lanes and footpaths.

== Public transport ==
Bus

- Sanders Coaches 44/44a 43

Rail

Both stations are approximately 5 miles (8.0 km) from the village.

- Wroxham railway station
- Worstead railway station

== Notable residents ==
- Robert Marsham, founding father of phenology

== Gallery ==
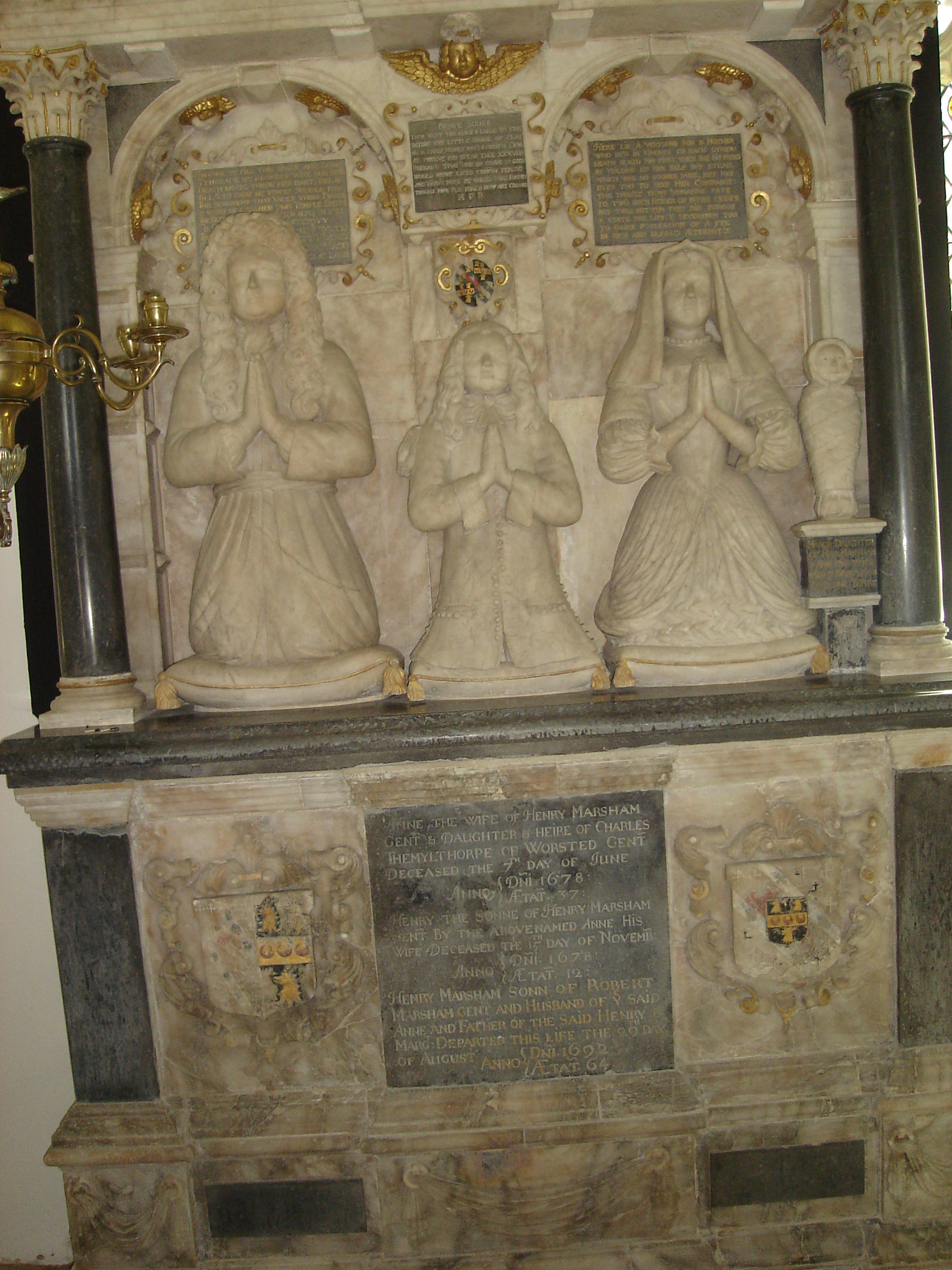
The Marsham family memorial

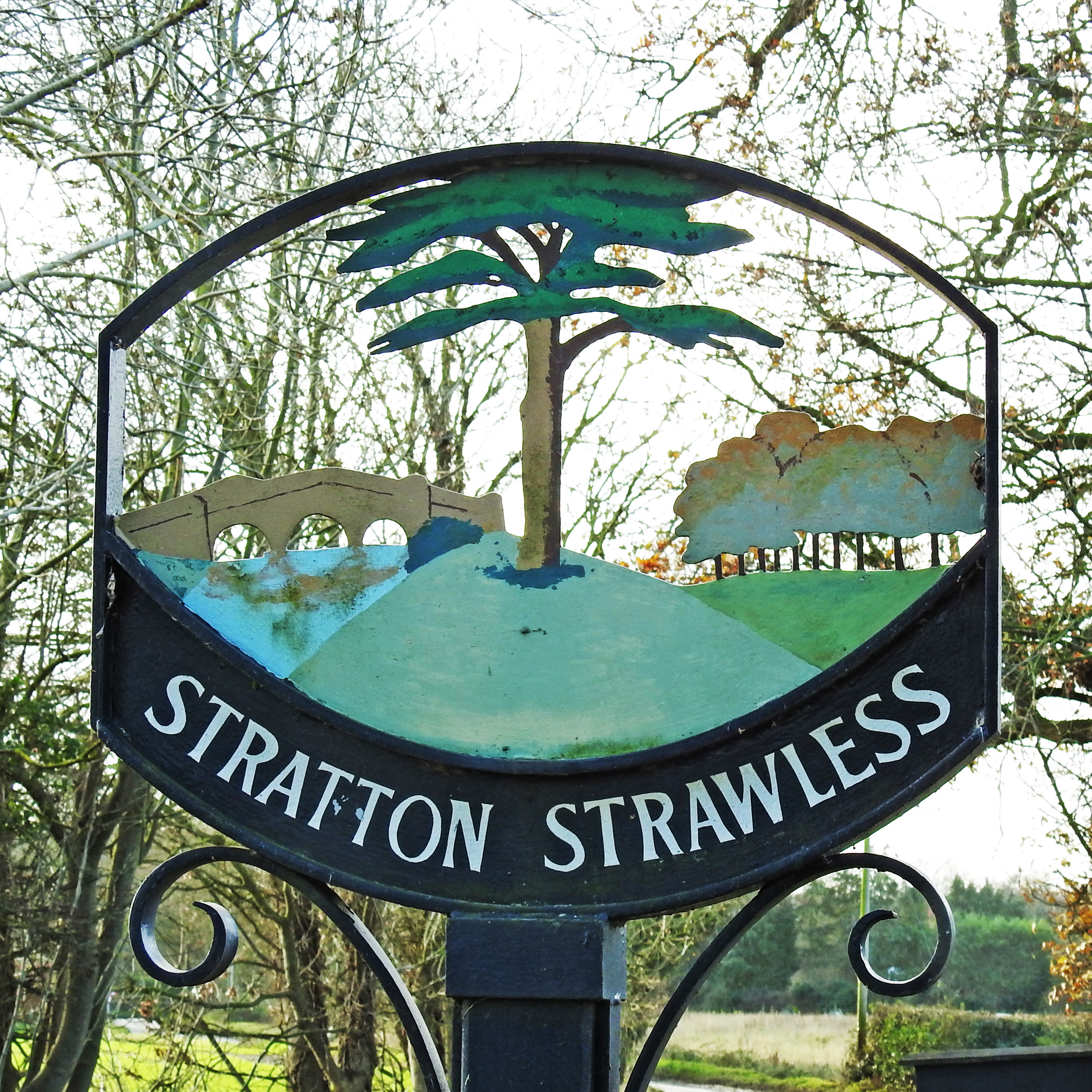
The village sign

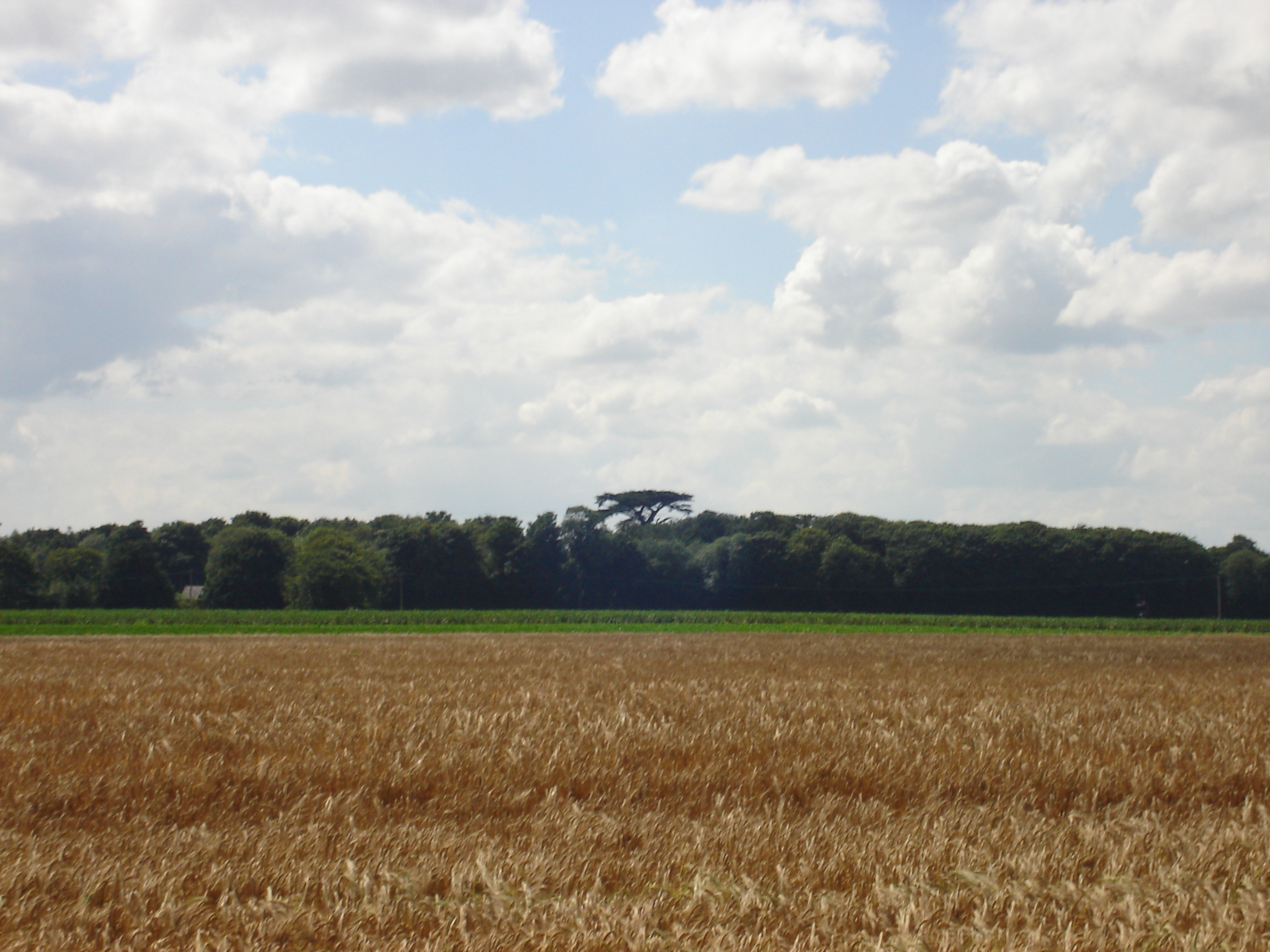
The Great Cedar

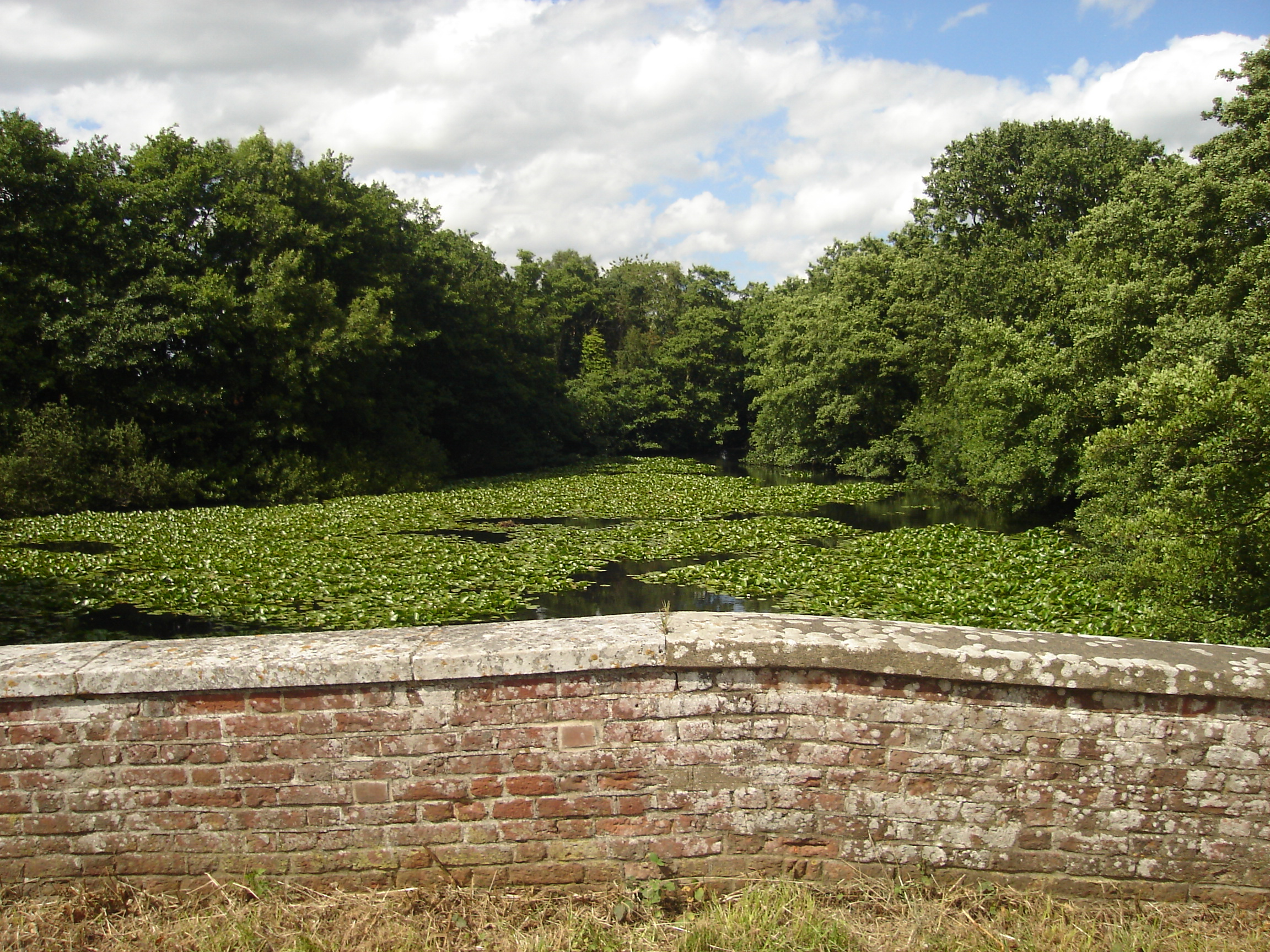
Lily ponds

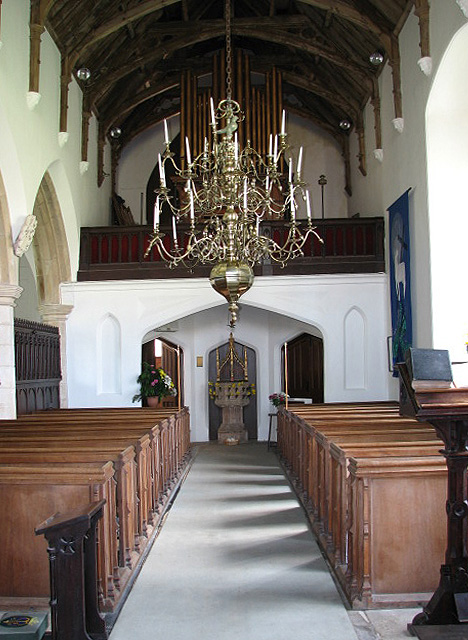
The great brass chandelier

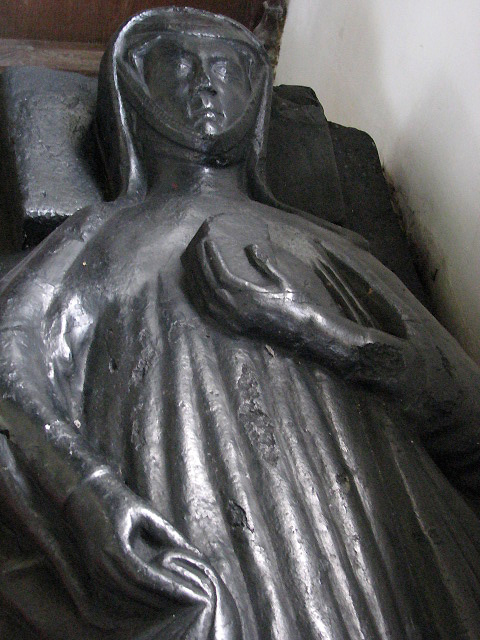
The Black Abbess
