= Felthorpe =

Village in Norfolk, England

Coordinates: 52.718515°N 1.210384°E

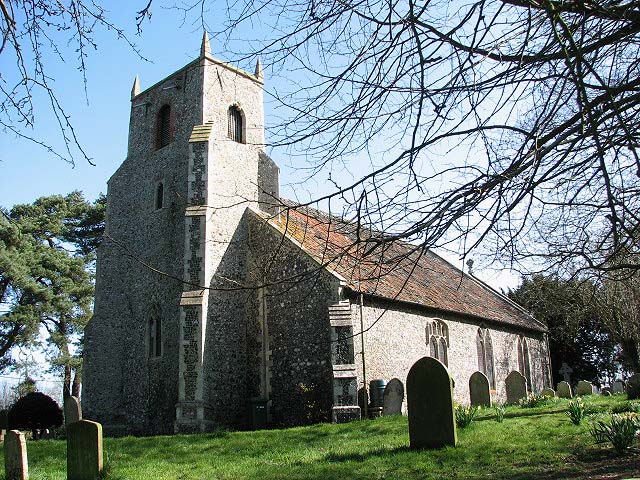
- St. Margaret's Church

- Location within Norfolk
- Area: 3.36 sq mi (8.7 km^{2})
- Population: 767 (2021 census)
  - Density: 228/sq mi (88/km^{2})
- OS grid reference: TG169182
  - London: 100 miles (160 km)
- Civil parish: Felthorpe
- District: Broadland
- Shire county: Norfolk
- Region: East
- Country: England
- Sovereign state: United Kingdom
- Post town: NORWICH
- Postcode district: NR10
- Dialling code: 01603
- Police: Norfolk
- Fire: Norfolk
- Ambulance: East of England
- UK Parliament: Broadland and Fakenham

Felthorpe is a village and civil parish in the English county of Norfolk.

Felthorpe is located 11 miles (18 km) east of Dereham and 7.1 miles (11.4 km) north-west of Norwich.

== History ==
Felthorpe's name is of mixed Anglo-Saxon and Viking origin and derives from an amalgamation of the Old Norse and Old English for "Faela's outlying farmstead or settlement".

In the Domesday Book of 1086, Felthorpe is listed as a settlement of 45 households in the hundred of Taverham. In 1086, the village was divided between the East Anglian estates of King William I, Alan of Brittany, Ralph de Beaufour, Walter Giffard and Reginald, son of Ivo.

Felthorpe Watermill stood in the village, on a small tributary of the River Wensum, since the later-Medieval period. In 1883, the mill was upgraded with a steam engine and subsequently demolished in 1927, though some foundations of the building and the wheelrace remain. Felthorpe Windmill stood within the parish from the late-18th century and closed sometime in the early-20th century. The land has reverted to agricultural use.

Felthorpe Hall was built in the nineteenth century as a manor house and still stands today as a Grade II listed private residence. The hall was used as a Red Cross convalescence hospital during the First and Second World Wars.

== Geography ==
According to the 2021 census, Felthorpe has a population of 767 people which shows an increase from the 745 people recorded in the 2011 census.

== St. Margaret's Church ==
Felthorpe's parish church is dedicated to Saint Margaret of Antioch and dates from the 17th century, with significant 19th-century restoration to the exterior and interior. St. Margaret's is located outside of the village on Bilney Lane and has been Grade II listed since 1961.

St Margaret's has a good range of stained glass installed by Ward and Hughes, with a further stone memorial plaque to Richard Inglett Fortescue Weston Conway, who died in the British colony of Demerara (now in Guyana) in 1856.

== Felthorpe Air Crash ==
On 3 June 1966, a Hawker Siddeley Trident jetliner crashed in the parish after the aircraft entered into a deep stall which the pilot was unable to correct. The Trident entered a flat spin and crashed in a field immediately adjacent to Felthorpe airfield. The aircraft was on a test flight from Hatfield Aerodrome and all four crew were killed in the crash.

== Felthorpe Airfield (Wood Farm) ==
Located to the southwest of the village is a grass airfield that was established in 1964. It is home to the Felthorpe Flying Group and is the base for a number of vintage aircraft, and also a Fokker Dr.I Dreidecker replica that first flew in 2018. The airfield suffered a suspected arson attack in February 2003, destroying a number of historic aircraft, and a hangar and other buildings.

== Amenities ==
The village public house has stood on its current site since the end of the 18th century and is still open today. The Mariner's Arms has been previously operated by Bullard's of Norwich, Watney-Mann and Brent Walker but today operates as a free house.

== Governance ==
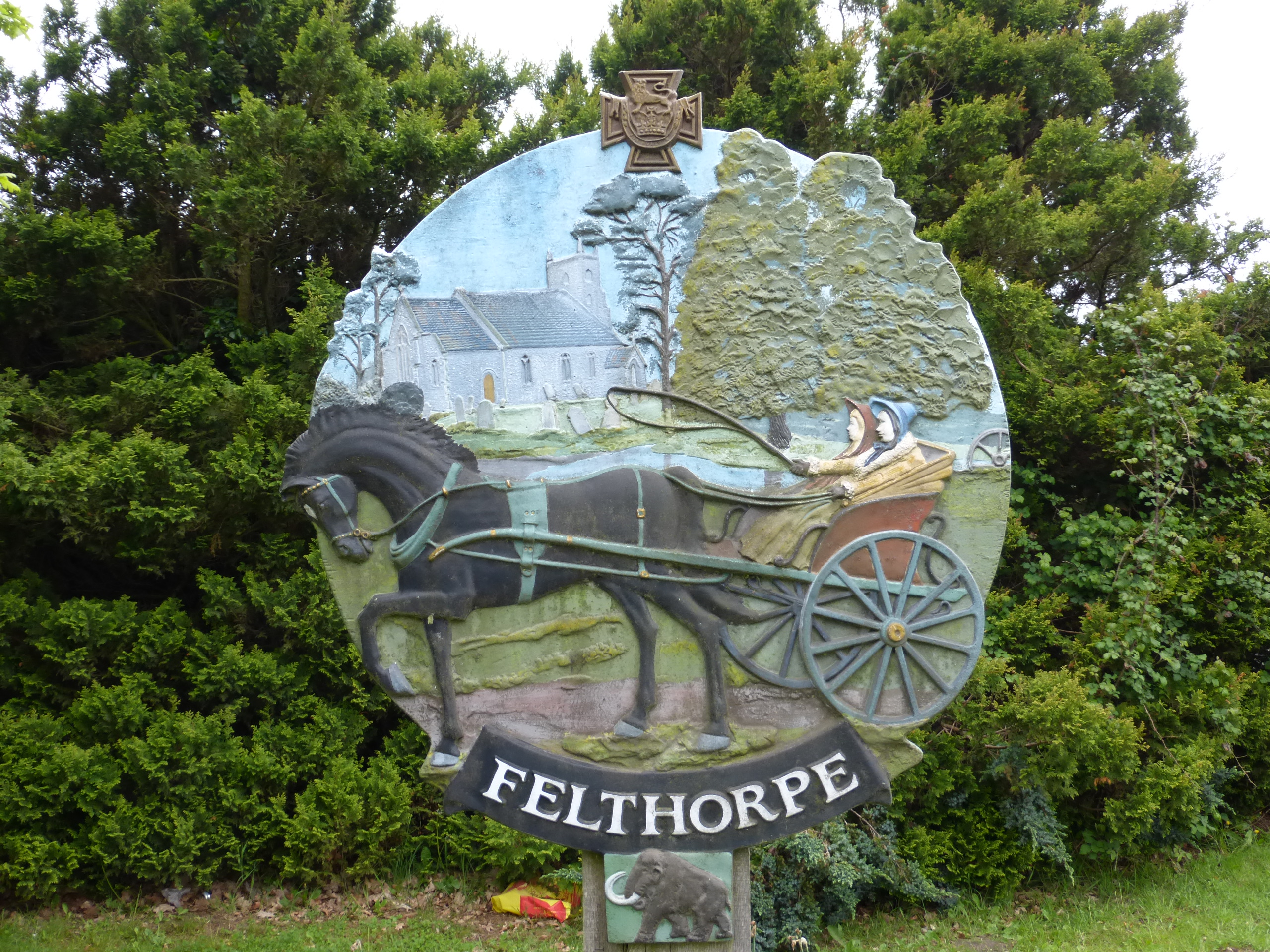
Felthorpe village sign

Felthorpe is part of the electoral ward of Horsford & Felthorpe for local elections and is part of the district of Broadland.

The village's national constituency is Broadland and Fakenham which has been represented by the Conservative Party's Jerome Mayhew MP since 2019.

== War memorial ==
St. Margaret's Church holds two memorials to the First World War, one a carved church screen detailing the men of Felthorpe who died during the conflict and a framed Roll of Honour with all the names of the men who served. The memorial lists the following men for the First World War:

Rank	Name	Unit	Date of death	Burial/Commemoration
LCpl.	George C. Stannard	49th (Edmonton) Bn., CEF	9 Mar. 1918	Edmonton Cemetery
Gnr.	Sidney G. Palmer	133rd Bty., Royal Garrison Artillery	24 Dec. 1918	St. Margaret's Churchyard
Pte.	A. Frank Wilkinson	47th (British Columbia) Bn., CEF	27 Sep. 1918	Quarry Road Cemetery
Pte.	Herbert J. Dack	8th Bn., Norfolk Regiment	19 Jul. 1916	Delville Wood Cemetery
Pte.	Brian T. Betts	7th Bn., Suffolk Regiment	28 Apr. 1917	Arras Memorial

As well as the following for the Second World War:

Rank	Name	Unit	Date of death	Burial/Commemoration
FLt.	Paul F. Mayhew	No. 79 Squadron RAF	19 Feb. 1942	Birmingham Crematorium
