= Marriott's Way =

Rail trail in Norfolk, England

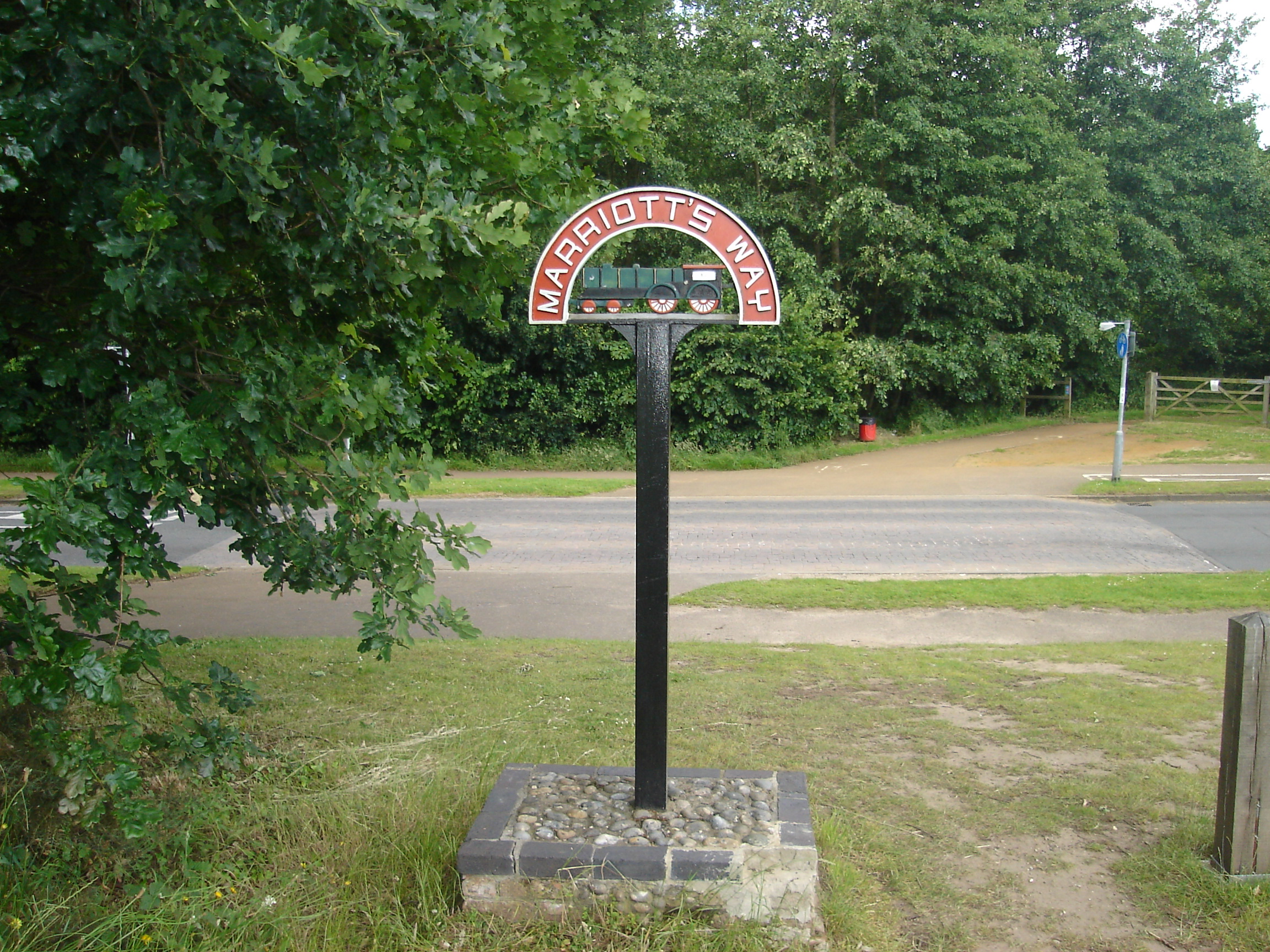
- The way at Thorpe Marriott village green, near Taverham
- Length: 39.5 km (24.5 mi)
- Location: Norfolk, England
- Designation: Rail trail
- Trailheads: Norwich (Note: Location: 52.6357°N 1.2873°E) and Aylsham (Note: Location: 52.7909°N 1.2541°E)
- Use: Hiking; running; cycling; horse-riding
- Season: All year

The Marriott's Way is a shared-use rail trail in north Norfolk, England, between Norwich and Aylsham via Themelthorpe. It forms part of the National Cycle Network (NCN) (Route 1) and the red route of Norwich's Pedalways cycle path network. It is open to walkers, cyclists and horse riders. Its total length is 24.6 mi (39.6 km). It has a mixture of surfaces: tarmac, compacted gravel and earth. The name of the route originates from the chief engineer and manager of the Midland and Great Northern Joint Railway (M&GNJR), William Marriott, who held the position for 41 years.

== Railway history ==
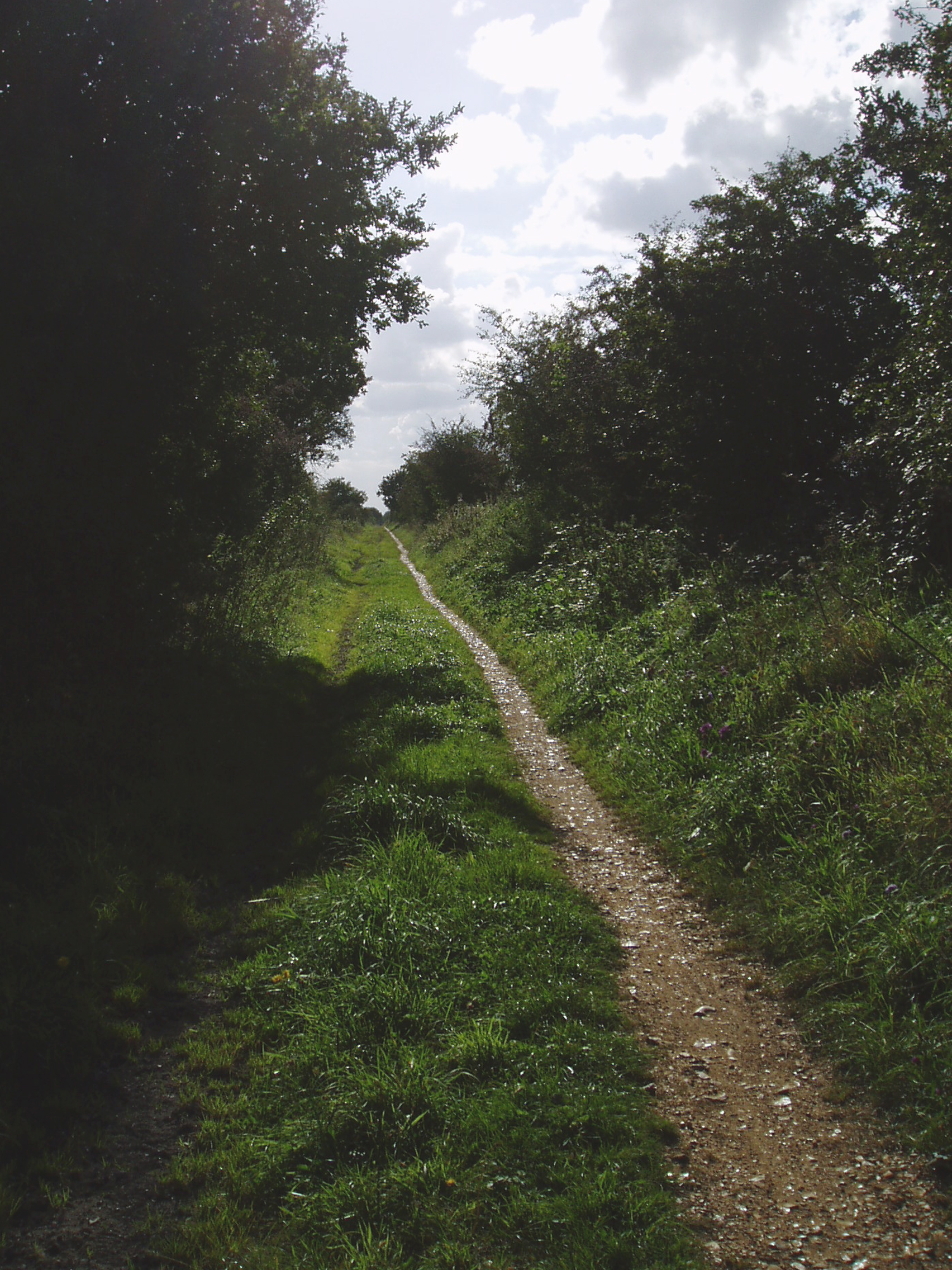
The way in summer close to Cawston

The path uses the trackbeds of two former railway lines: from Norwich City to Themelthorpe, and from Themelthorpe to Aylsham South. The former was built in 1882 by the Lynn and Fakenham Railway Company, which was taken over by the M&GNJR in 1893 as part of a line that ran to Melton Constable; this line gave a through route to the Midlands. The Themelthorpe to Aylsham line was completed in 1893 by the Great Eastern Railway to provide a link to its other lines at Wroxham and County School, close to North Elmham.

The lines were never profitable. Freight services were largely based on farm products and the line was closed to passenger traffic in 1959.

In 1960, the two lines were joined by the Themelthorpe Curve, believed to be the sharpest bend on the British Railways network. Its construction was to maintain the important movement of concrete products from Lenwade railway station; once production ceased in 1985, the line was closed.

== Route ==
At Norwich, the path begins to the north of the Barn Road and Barker Street Inner Ring Road roundabout; much of this area was part of the former Norwich City railway station. The path, which is also known as the Railway Path, follows approximately the course of the river Wensum which forms a boundary with the 12 acres (4.9 ha) Train Wood.

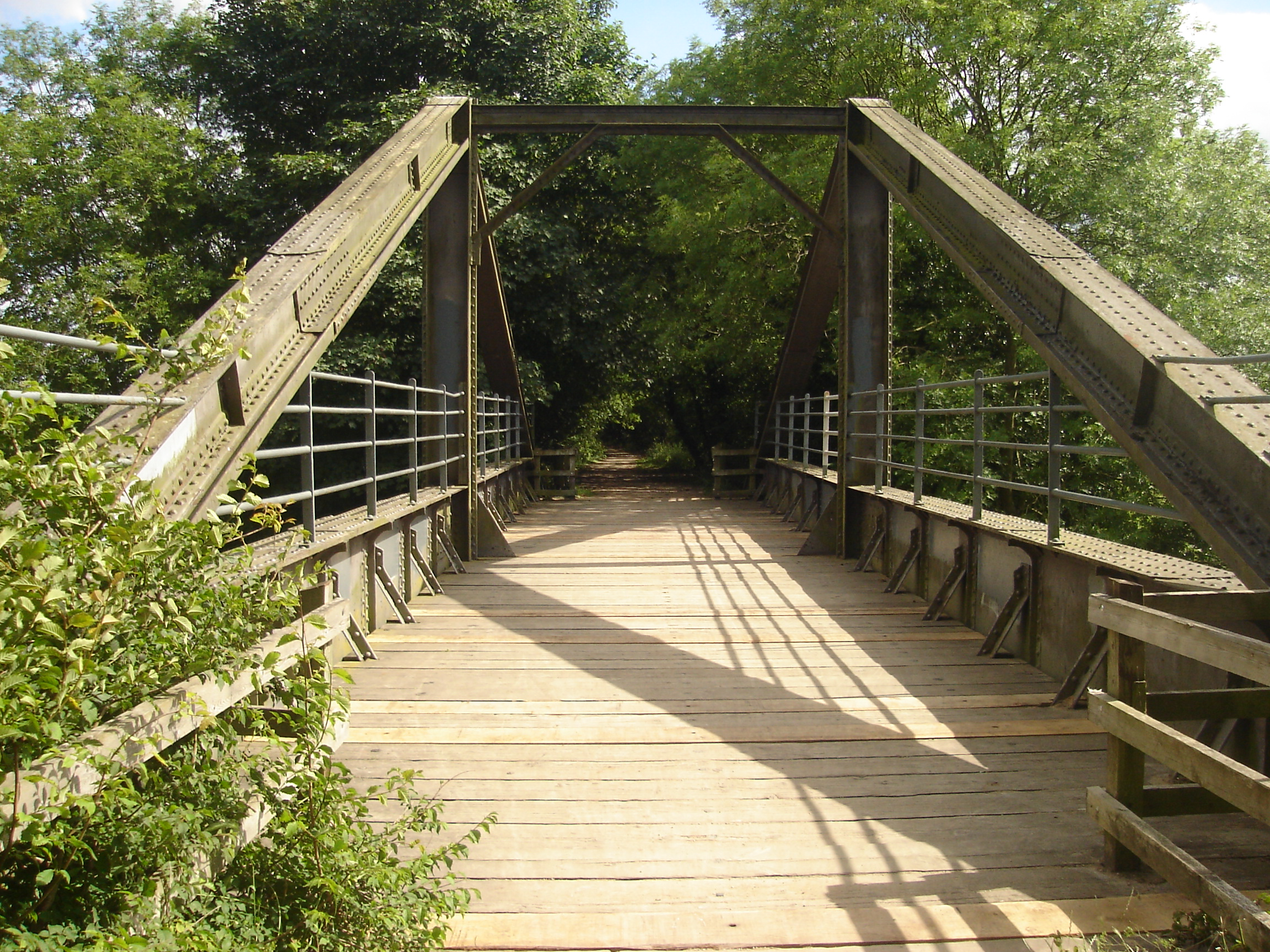
The 'A' Frame bridge on the outskirts of Hellesdon

After crossing a footbridge, the industrial landscape gives way to the water-meadows of the Sweetbriar Road Meadows before crossing the Wensum over the A frame bridge at Hellesdon. Travelling in a northerly direction from the junction of Marlpit Lane and Hellesdon Road, through the site of the former Hellesdon railway station, the way soon crosses the tiny river Tud at Costessey. The tree-lined river Wensum can be seen to the east, as the path passes through the open country side of the Wensum Valley. The river is crossed by means of an A-frame bridge (there are only three in Norfolk), before arriving at Drayton. The original Drayton railway station is now an industrial estate; the path follows a gravel path before crossing a minor road and entering a deep cutting to cross the busy A1067 road, close to Taverham. To the west is Thorpe Marriott, a large housing estate built in the late 20th century.

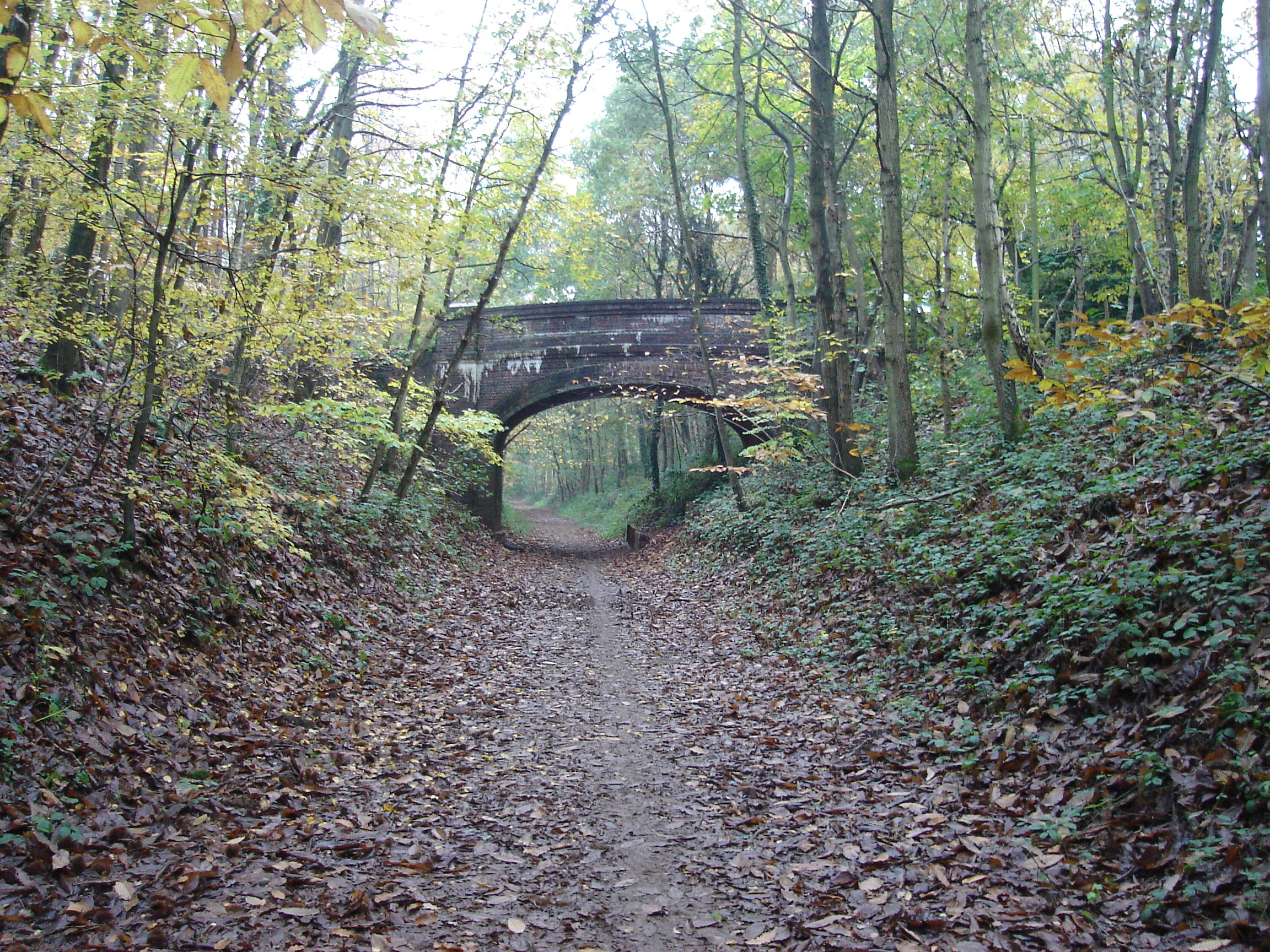
Bridge at Mileplain plantation

The tranquil path passes through extensive mixed woodland of the Mileplain plantation to cross the Wensum below Attlebridge. To the east of the way, the circular Winch's Way can be accessed which links to the Swannington and Alderford commons. After reaching a country lane, the privately owned former Attlebridge railway station can be viewed; the way can be accessed close to a car park and picnic area. After passing through birch woods, the large industrial estate of Lenwade can be seen to the west of the way and water filled gravel pits to the east.

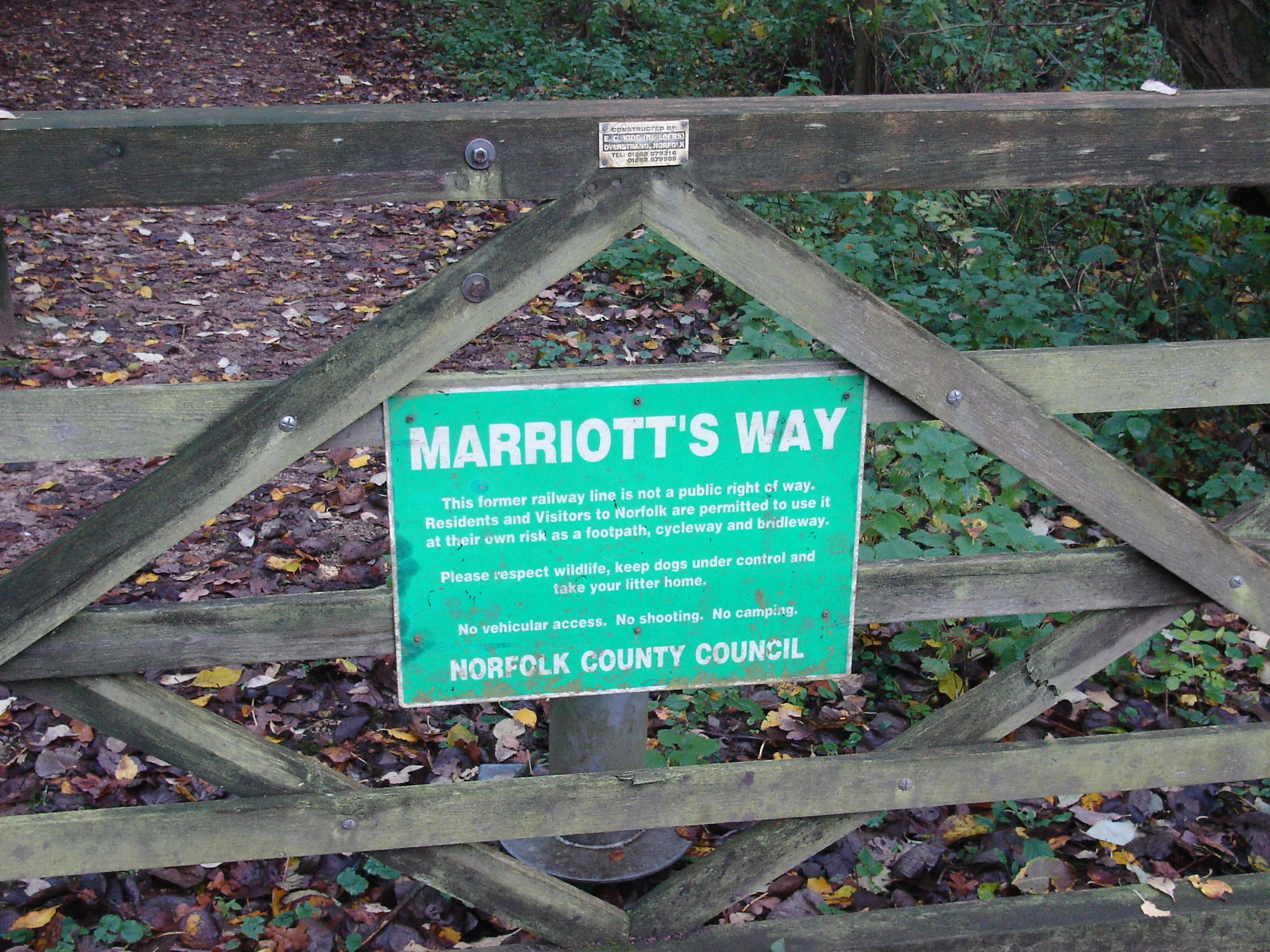
Sign at Lenwade

Crossing the Wensum for the last time, and close to the former Lenwade railway station which is now privately owned, and on to Whitwell.

The (NCN) leaves Marriott's Way to follow a short cut along quiet lanes to Reepham. The way carries on to Themelthorpe and follows the curve to the important stop of Reepham, where the preserved station and engineering shed can be found. Following an easterly course, the path passes close by to the village of Cawston on the B1145 road and then crosses the B1149 road. To the north, the way links to Blickling Hall via Weavers' Way before reaching the end of the trail at Aylsham; directly opposite is Aylsham railway station and Bure Valley Path, another rail trail.

== Ecology ==
While the railway line was in use, trackside vegetation would have been partly controlled. The vegetation would have been cut regularly or sprayed with herbicides, so that trains were not obstructed and to lessen the risk of fire. When the railway closed, such management ceased and a wide variety of plants colonised the track; this has made it the diverse habitat for wildlife that it is today.

In the Wensum Valley, immediately above the flood plain between Hellesdon and Drayton, over 100 species of vegetation have been recorded including hawthorn, guelder rose, wild rose, blackthorn, scrub oak, gorse and broom. Many wild flowers can be found such as shepherd's purse, ox-eye daisy, white campion and meadow saxifrage. Closer to the river, the soil becomes heavier and wetter and vegetation includes alder, elder, marsh marigold and willow.

To the north of Drayton, the way passes over a variety of soil types. On the chalky soils, typical plants found are the sycamore, birch and chalk grassland species such as wild carrot, self heal, bird's-foot-trefoil, knapweed and mullein. On the sandy soils bracken, birch and gorse are the more dominant species. Also of note are lichens, which are colonising many of the concrete structures and bridges along the track. The way is an important area for insects, birds and small mammals because of the variety of wild plants that are found.

== Public works of art ==
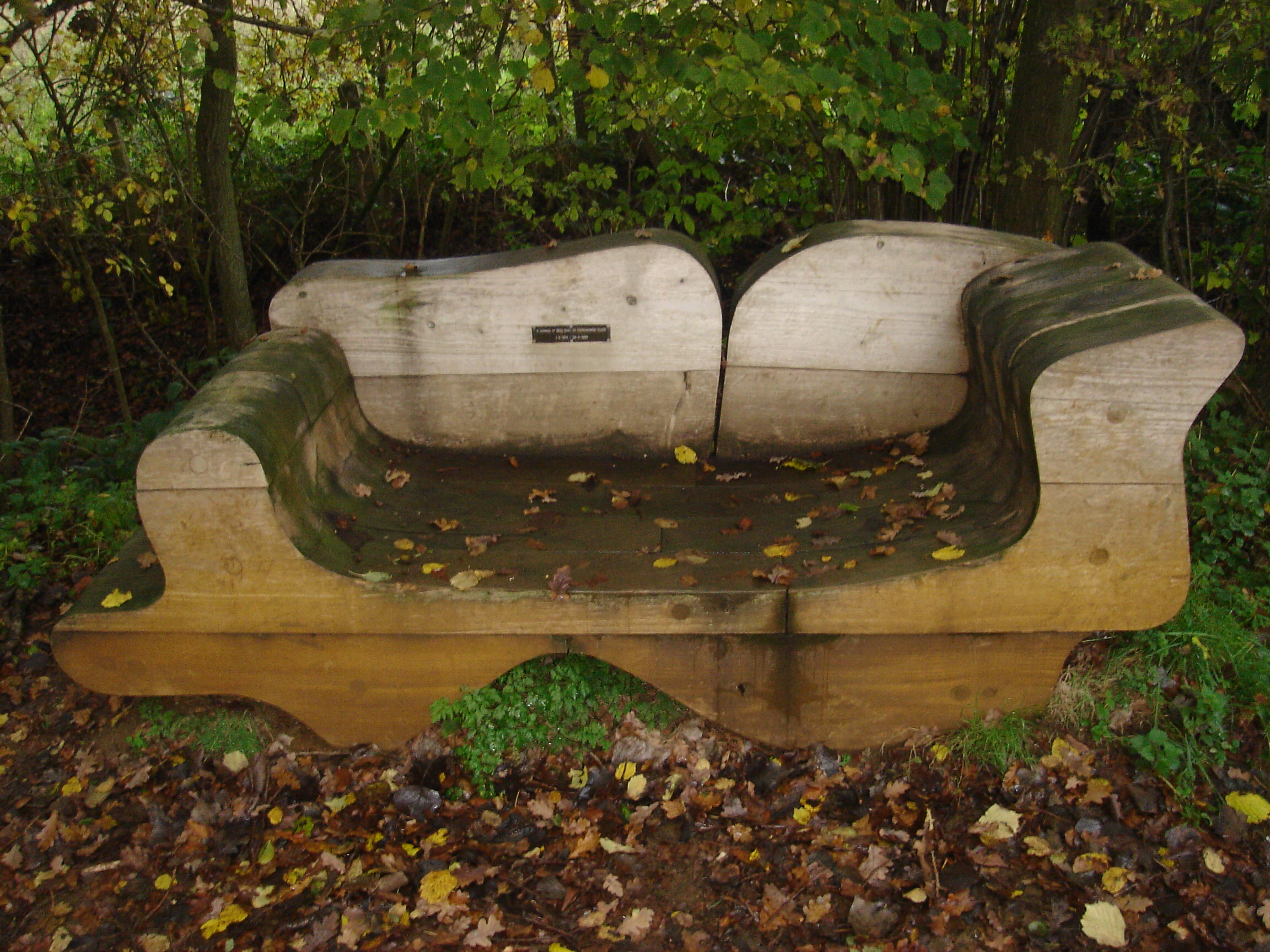
Wooden bench

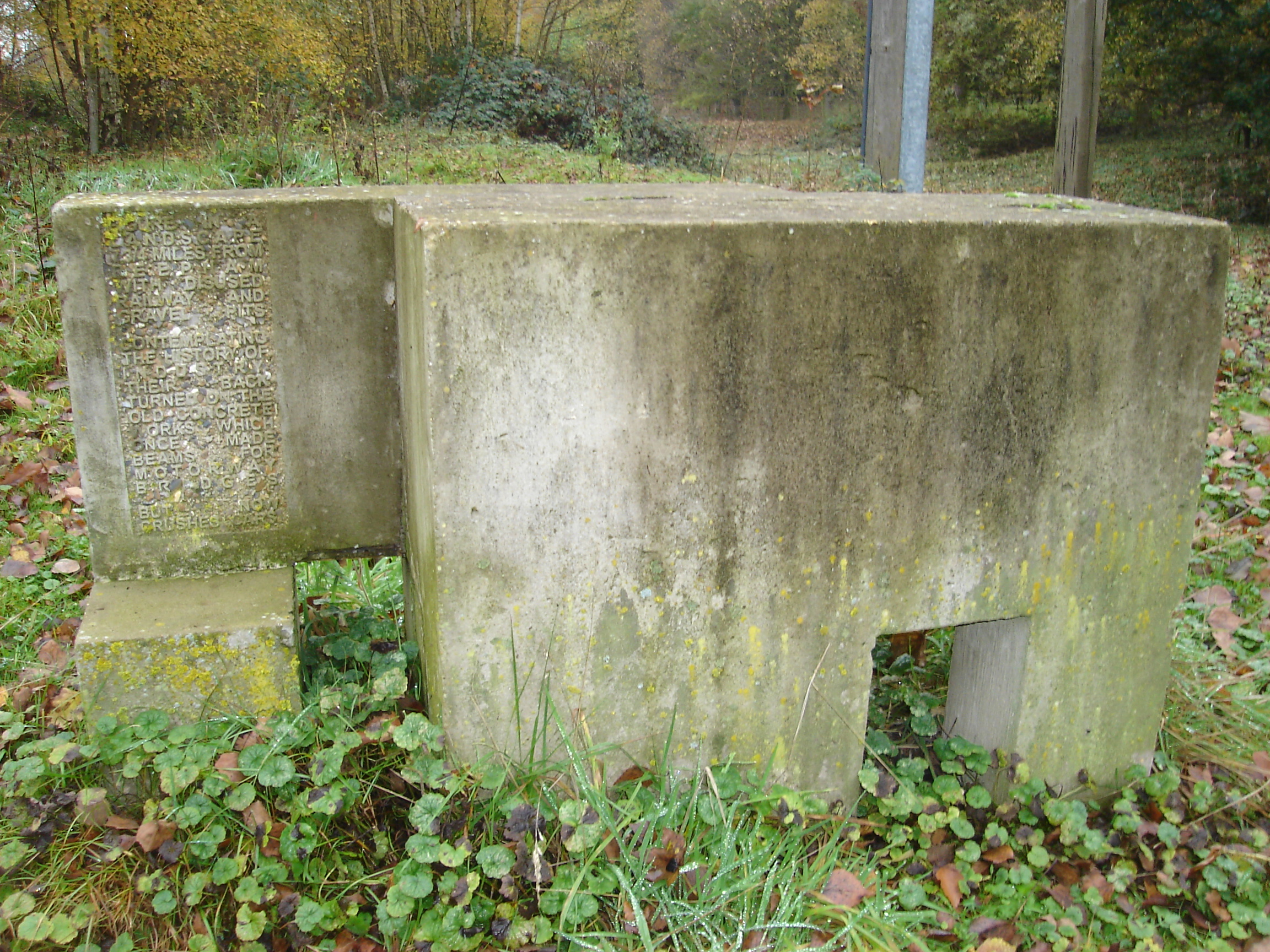
Concrete sculpture at Lenwade inscribed with the words: "Figure in a landscape 7¾ miles from Reepham with disused railway and gravel pits contemplating the history of industry and their back turned on the old concrete works, which once produced beams for motorway bridges but now crushes cars."

Several concrete public works of art can be seen along the way, as a constant reminder of the line's connection with the concrete industry and of its last days as a freight line, carrying concrete products. Also on view are hand crafted benches and places to rest; many of these memorials are to cyclists and other way users.

The route is marked by steel benches, fabricated from flat-bottomed rail at intervals of one mile starting from the site of Norwich City station. Each bench is to a different design, often with the rail twisted or bent, but always with a flat length at sitting height.

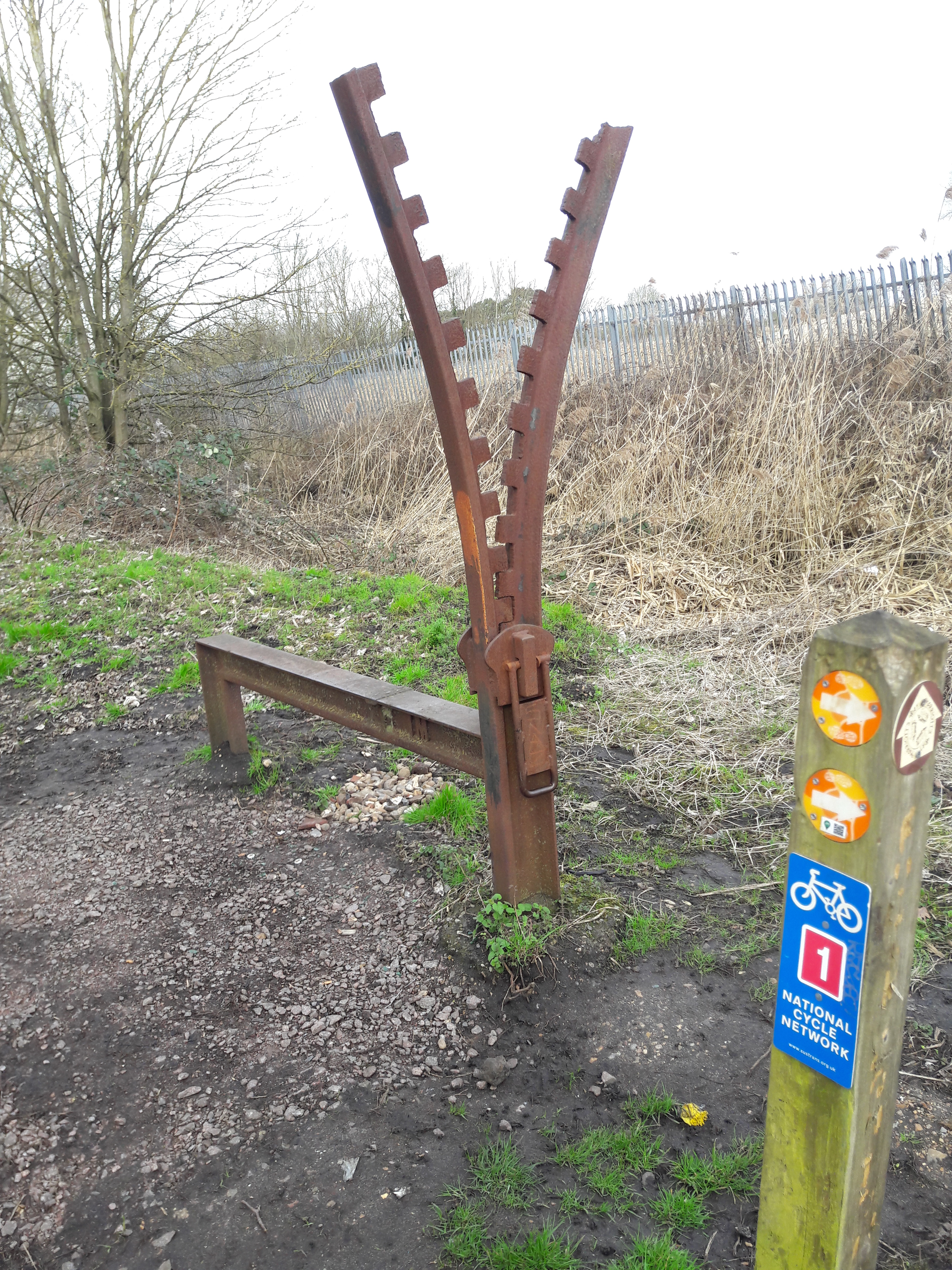
Steel zip sculpture/bench, located a mile north of the site of Norwich City station on Marriott's Way

== Public access ==
Apart from the main trailheads at Norwich and Aylsham, the trail can be accessed at several points throughout its length.

== Gallery ==
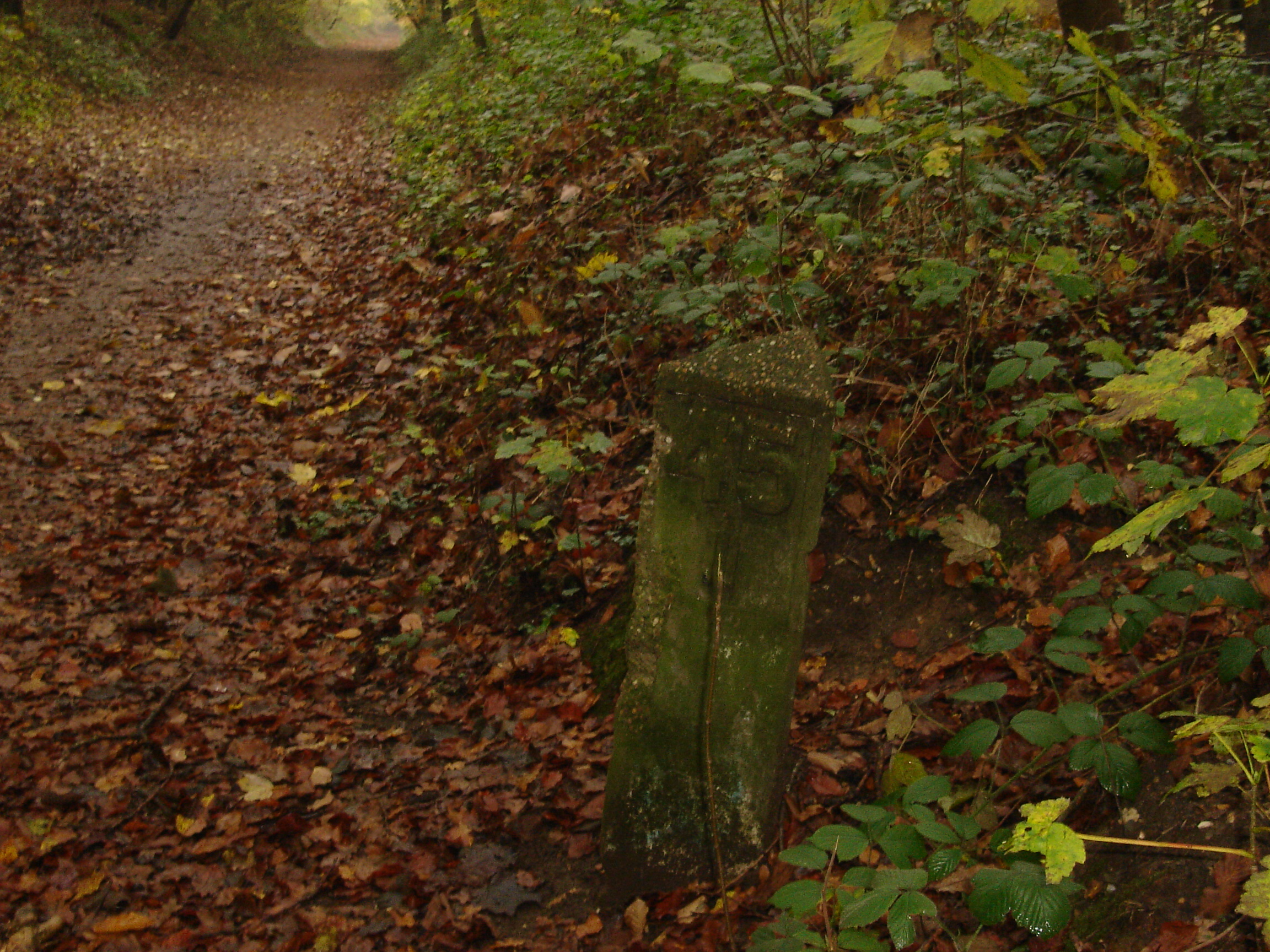
Concrete mile-post

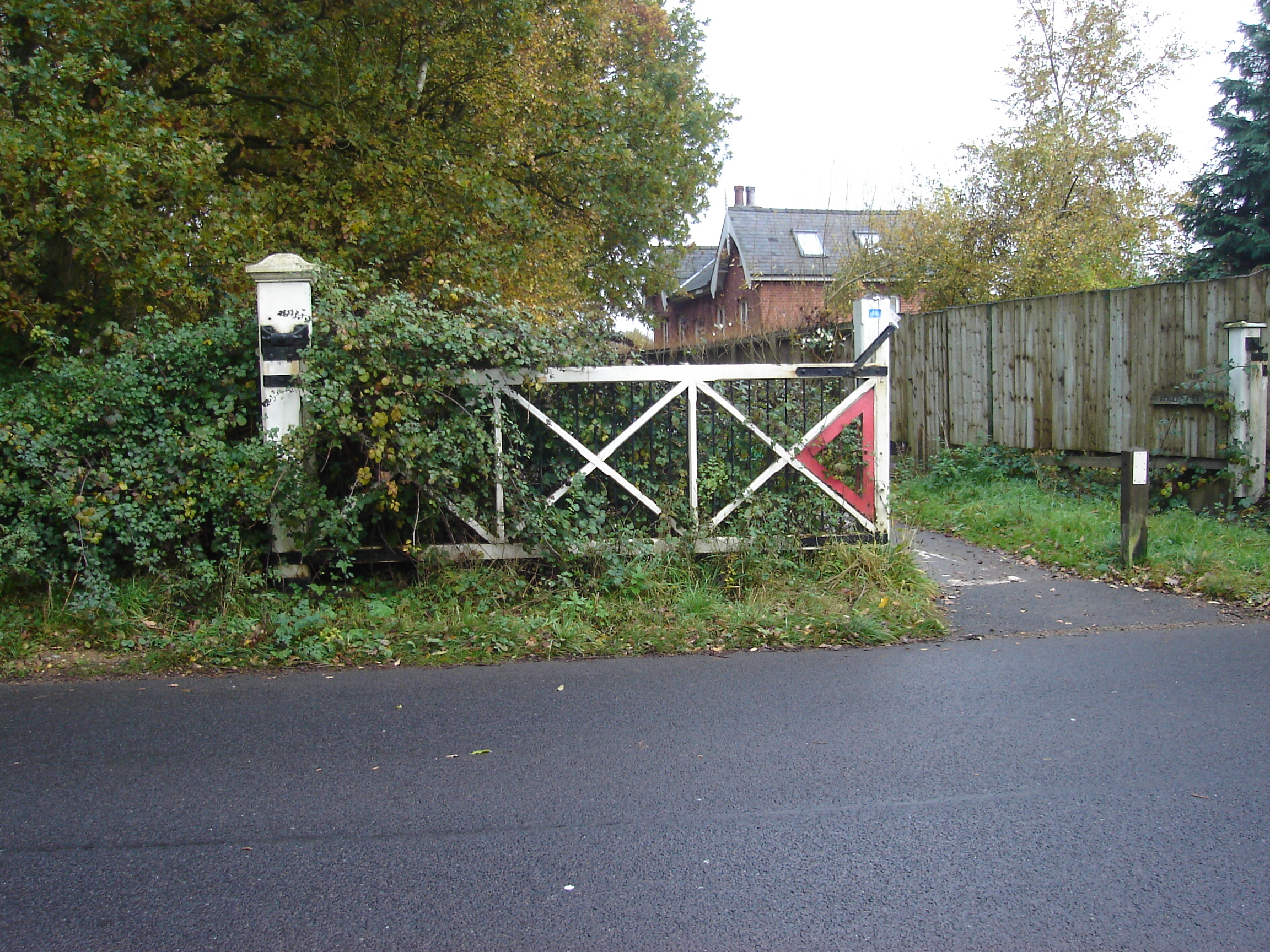
Level crossing at Lenwade

== See also ==
- Official Norfolk Trails website
- Recreational walks in Norfolk
