= Thorpe Marriott =

Residential area in Norfolk, England

Coordinates: 52.68°N 1.21°E

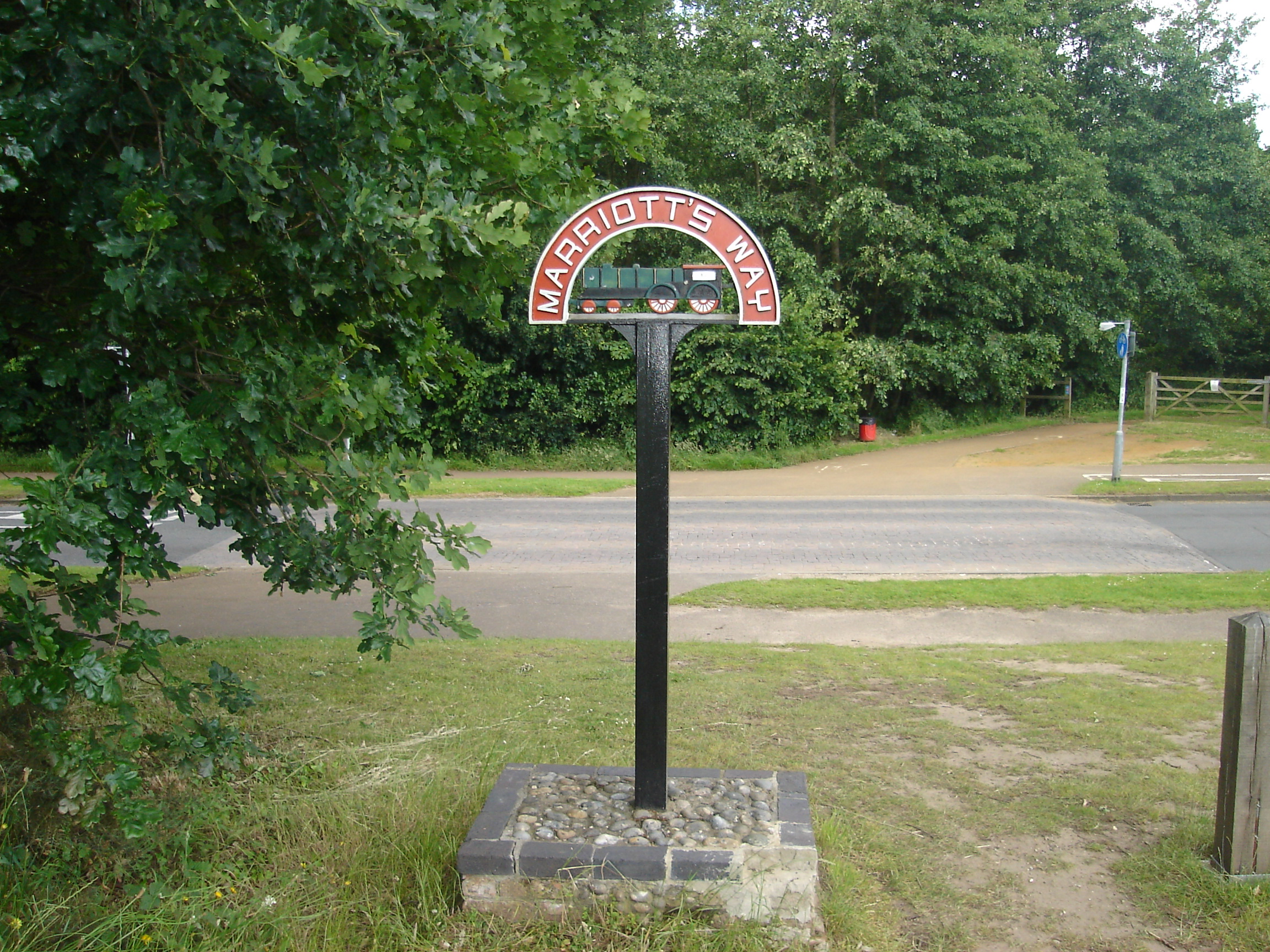
- Marriott's Way passes through the locality close to the village green

- Location within Norfolk
- OS grid reference: TG165145
- District: Broadland
- Shire county: Norfolk
- Region: East
- Country: England
- Sovereign state: United Kingdom
- Post town: NORWICH
- Postcode district: NR8
- Dialling code: 01603
- Police: Norfolk
- Fire: Norfolk
- Ambulance: East of England
- UK Parliament: Norwich North

Thorpe Marriott is a residential area in Norfolk, England covering part of Taverham and Drayton parishes. Much of its housing was built during the last quarter of the 20th century.

It enjoys the amenities of both parishes, which are easily accessible from Fakenham Road (A1067). Although lacking its own school, surgery or chemist, Thorpe Marriott holds a church and the Old Mill public house. Marriott's Way passes through it.

== History ==
Broadland District Council first earmarked the 380-acre site for development in 1986. By 1994, 1,500 homes had been built, with plans for the residence of around 5,200 people once the project was to be finished. The plans included a mix of house styles including family houses, two bedroom terraces and bungalows.

In 2005, the landlord of The Otter pub in Thorpe Marriott campaigned to gain a drinks licence extension to open later on Saint George's Day by designating it as a national holiday, but this was refused by a high court judge.

A mural of Grogu and the Mandalorian was created at a park in the area in 2023. Plans for the building of 1,530 new homes as well as a pub, a primary school, a medical centre, and shops on farmland on the edge of Thorpe Marriott, near the Norwich Northern Distributor Road were recommended in December that year.

== Marriott's Way ==
Passing through the development is Marriott's Way, a long distance footpath, bridleway and cycle route which forms part of National Cycle Route 1.
