= Themelthorpe =

Village and civil parish in Norfolk, England

Coordinates: 52.77271°N 1.04622°E

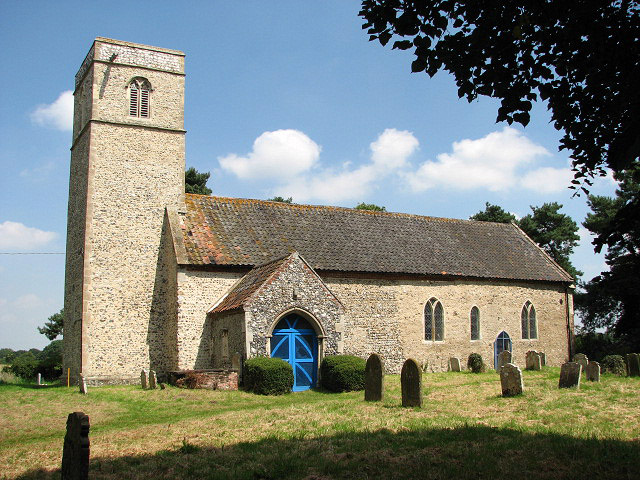
- St Andrew's church, Themelthorpe

- Location within Norfolk
- Area: 2.69 km^{2} (1.04 sq mi)
- Population: 65
  - Density: 24/km^{2} (62/sq mi)
- OS grid reference: TG055238
- Civil parish: Themelthorpe
- District: Broadland
- Shire county: Norfolk
- Region: East
- Country: England
- Sovereign state: United Kingdom
- Post town: DEREHAM
- Postcode district: NR20
- Dialling code: 01362
- Police: Norfolk
- Fire: Norfolk
- Ambulance: East of England

Themelthorpe is a civil parish in the English county of Norfolk, 3 miles (4.8 km) north-east of Reepham. It covers an area of 1.04 sq mi (2.7 km^{2}) and had a population of 65 in 27 households at the 2001 census. For the purposes of local government, it lies within the district of Broadland.

== Themelthorpe Curve ==
The Themelthorpe Curve was built to join two separate stretches of railway:

- Themelthorpe to Norwich, which was built in 1882 by the Midland and Great Northern Joint Railway
- Themelthorpe to Aylsham, which was completed in 1883 by the Great Eastern Railway.

It was to be the final section of railway track built in Norfolk by British Rail and was the sharpest curve in the whole of the British rail network.

The curve was opened in 1960, to shorten the route of freight trains carrying concrete products running from a terminal at Lenwade, and was closed by 1985. It is now part of the Marriott's Way footpath, which links Aylsham with Norwich.
