= Drayton, Norfolk =

Village and civil parish in Norfolk, England

Coordinates: 52.675°N 1.225°E

Drayton
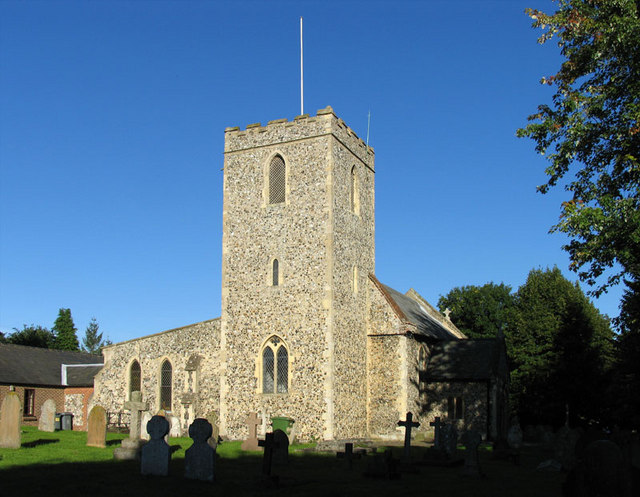
- St. Margaret's Church

- Location within Norfolk
- Area: 5.56 sq mi (14.4 km^{2})
- Population: 5,392 (2021 census)
  - Density: 970/sq mi (370/km^{2})
- OS grid reference: TG185135
- Civil parish: Drayton
- District: Broadland
- Shire county: Norfolk
- Region: East
- Country: England
- Sovereign state: United Kingdom
- Post town: NORWICH
- Postcode district: NR8
- Dialling code: 01603
- Police: Norfolk
- Fire: Norfolk
- Ambulance: East of England
- UK Parliament: Norwich North

Drayton is a suburban village and civil parish in the English county of Norfolk. It is located in the district of Broadland, 4.3 miles (6.9 km) north-west of Norwich and 8.3 miles (13.4 km) south of Aylsham. Today, Drayton is largely dominated by the Thorpe Marriott housing estate built in the late twentieth century.

== Etymology ==
Drayton's name is of Anglo-Saxon origin and derives from the Old English for "a farmstead or settlement where logs were dragged."

== History ==
In the early twentieth century, several Roman artefacts including coins and pottery were unearthed close to the village, with a further Anglo-Saxon cemetery being discovered on the banks of the nearby River Wensum. The cemetery has yielded Anglo-Saxon brooches, daggers and pottery.

In the Domesday Book, Drayton is listed as a settlement of ten households in the hundred of Taverham. In 1086, the village was part of the estates of Ralph de Beaufour.

Throughout the mid-fifteenth century, Drayton was part of the estates of Sir John Fastolf, a prominent English soldier in the Hundred Years War and the basis of Shakespeare's Sir John Falstaff. Fastolf built Drayton Lodge in 1437, as a fortification overlooking the Wensum.

By the time of Falstolf's death in 1459, his estates passed into the hands of John Paston, which was fiercely contested by John de la Pole, Duke of Suffolk whose estates consisted of the neighbouring village of Costessey. The clashes resulting from the dispute are documented in the Paston Letters. Though Drayton Lodge was partly demolished in 1465, the ruins are still visible today.

To the west of Drayton is a rare example of a private fallout shelter built to Government specification during the Cold War.

== Geography ==
According to the 2021 census, Drayton has a population of 5,392 people which shows a decrease from the 5,489 people recorded in the 2011 census.

Drayton is bisected by the A1067, between Fakenham and Norwich, with the A1270, the Norwich ring-road, also briefly passing through the parish. The River Wensum also passes through the parish.

== St. Margaret's Church ==
Drayton's parish church is dedicated to Saint Margaret the Virgin and dates from the nineteenth century, with some medieval features still surviving. St. Margaret's is located on School Road and has been Grade II listed since 1984.

St. Margaret's was largely rebuilt in the Victorian era after a catastrophic tower-collapse in 1850. The church also boasts a good collection of stained-glass depicting Anna the Prophetess, Saint Mary and Saint Elizabeth, which were designed by an unknown German workshop as well as J & J King of Norwich. There is also a window depicting the Ascension of Jesus by Ward and Hughes.

== Amenities ==
Drayton has a petrol station (all night), estate agent, two post offices, butcher, doctors’ surgery, late night pharmacy, chemist, a dental practice, baker, patisserie, florist, four hairdressers, beautician, dress shop and two Tesco outlets. There are several public houses including the Cock Inn and the Red Lion, along with the Stower Grange hotel and restaurant. It also has two industrial estates.

The village also has the Longdale and King George V playing fields, the Bob Carter Sports and Community Centre. Drayton also has Low Road Potato Farm, which serves the local community and businesses with potatoes and vegetables. R G Carter construction and farms' businesses are located here.

Furthermore, nearby Thorpe Marriott has its own shopping centre at Acres Way, including a fish shop, mini Tesco, the Otter public house and an estate agent.

Drayton has two schools:

- Drayton Community Infant School: for children aged 4 to 6. It was given a 'Requires Improvement' rating by Ofsted in 2022,
- Drayton Church of England Junior School: for children aged 6 to 11, which was rated as 'Good' in 2013.

Thorpe Marriott is served by Trinity Ecumenical Church (Methodist and Anglican) and by St Margaret's Drayton and St Edmund's Taverham, which partner with local methodists in the Trinity LEP (Local Ecumenical Partnership). St Margaret's, together with Drayton Methodist and Trinity Church, are members of Churches Together in Drayton, Taverham & Thorpe Marriott.

== Transport ==
Drayton railway station opened in 1882 as a stop on the Midland and Great Northern Joint Railway route between Melton Constable and Norwich City; it was closed in 1959.

Today, the former trackbed forms part of Marriott's Way, a long-distance shared-use path between Norwich and Aylsham.

First Eastern Counties, Sanders Coaches and Konectbus operate local bus routes, linking the area with Norwich, Fakenham, Hellesdon and Thorpe Marriot.

== Governance ==
Drayton is split into two electoral wards for local elections: Drayton North and Drayton South, which are both within the district of Broadland.

The village's national constituency is Norwich North, which has been represented by the Labour Party's Alice Macdonald MP since 2024.

== Notable residents ==
- General Robert Napier Raikes (1813-1909), soldier, born in Drayton
- Captain Harry Cator VC MM (1894–1966), soldier and civil servant, born in Drayton
- Trevor Painter (1949-2012), Norwich City and Colchester United footballer, lived and died in Drayton
- Dave Bussey (b.1952), radio DJ, born in Drayton
- Aaron Sillis (b.1983), dancer and choreographer, born in Drayton.

== War memorial ==
Drayton's war memorial is a carved stone plaque inside St. Margaret's Church, which lists the following names for the First World War:

Rank	Name	Unit	Date of death	Burial/Commemoration
Lt.	Samuel S. Wainwright	6th Bn., Norfolk Regiment	12 Mar. 1917	Regina Trench Cemetery
QSgt.	William H. Waters	61st Bty., Royal Garrison Artillery	29 Apr. 1918	Hazebrouck Cemetery
Pte.	Cyril P. Steward	16th Bn., Army Cyclist Corps	15 Oct. 1918	Kirechkoi-Hortakoi Cem.
Pte.	Cecil W. Warnes	11th Pontoon Park, Army Service Cs.	24 Mar. 1918	Heath Cemetery, Harbonnieres
Pte.	Bertie Stevenson	4th Bn., Bedfordshire Regiment	26 Aug. 1917	Bailleul Road Cemetery
Pte.	James W. Clarke	13th Bn., Essex Regiment	28 Apr. 1917	Arras Memorial
Pte.	Charles E. Stevenson	13th Bn., Royal Sussex Regiment	31 Jul. 1917	Menin Gate
Pte.	Frederick W. Bailey	1st Bn., Welsh Guards	1 Dec. 1917	Cambrai Memorial
Pte.	Thomas E. Barrett	1/5th Bn., West Yorkshire Regiment	11 Dec. 1918	Hautmont Cemetery

The following are listed from the Second World War:

Rank	Name	Unit	Date of death	Burial
Maj.	John C. Bunting MiD	Royal Artillery	6 Dec. 1944	Barrackpore Cemetery
Capt.	Ernest L. Wilson	Royal Army Service Corps	20 Oct. 1939	St. Margaret's Churchyard
Sgt.	William R. Symonds	Royal Air Force Volunteer Reserve	7 Jun. 1945	Little Plumstead Churchyard
Sgt.	Basil V. Clinton	No. 247 Squadron RAF	30 Mar. 1945	Amersfoort Cemetery
AS	Harry A. G. Holman	HMS Curacoa	2 Oct. 1942	St. Margaret's Churchyard
Cpl.	Charles S. Gould	Royal Norfolk Regiment	15 Jun. 1944	St. Margaret's Churchyard
LCpl.	Godfrey Alderton	6th Bn., Royal Norfolks.	26 Jan. 1942	Kranji War Memorial
OS	Kenneth J. Pratt	HMS Tynedale	12 Dec. 1943	Chatham Naval Memorial
Pte.	George E. Ruddock	5th Bn., Royal Norfolk Regiment	1 Aug. 1944	Chungkai War Cemetery
Pte.	Harold G. Carman	6th Bn., Royal Norfolks.	1 Apr. 1945	Kanchanaburi War Cemetery
Pte.	Leonard Stevenson	6th Bn., Parachute Regiment	17 Aug. 1944	Mazargues Cemetery

The war memorial also lists three civilians (Thomas Bell, R. H. Clarke and S. G. Fox) who were killed by unknown enemy action.
