= Attlebridge railway station =

Former railway station in Norfolk, England

Coordinates: 52.7134°N 1.1505°E

Attlebridge
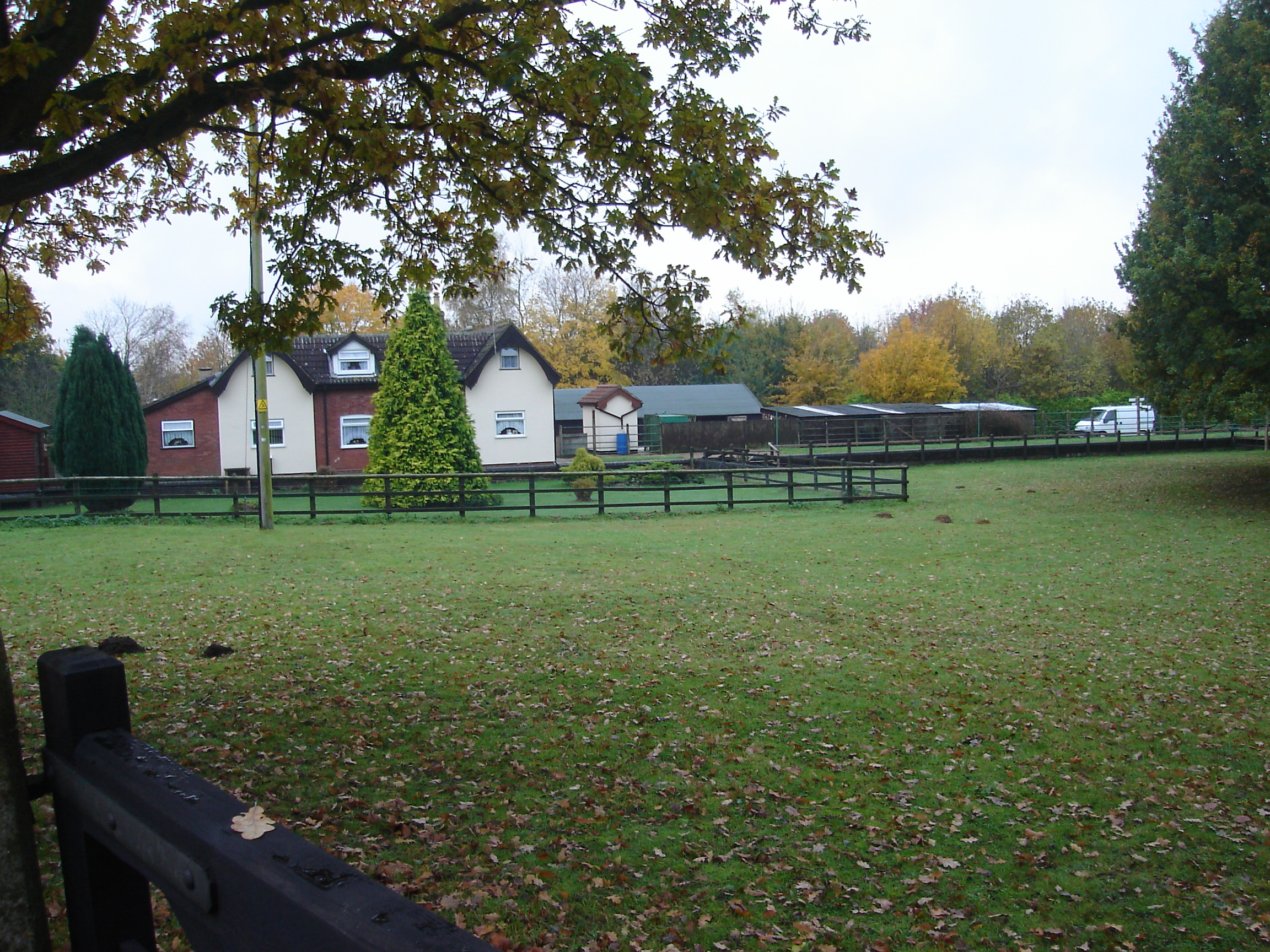
- The former station is now a private residence.

General information
- Location: Attlebridge, Norfolk; England
- Grid reference: TG129175
- Platforms: 1

Other information
- Status: Disused

History
- Post-grouping: Midland and Great Northern Joint Railway

Key dates
- 2 December 1882: Station opened
- 2 March 1959: Station closed to passengers
Location

Attlebridge railway station is a closed station in Norfolk, England. It served the small village of Attlebridge. It was constructed by the Midland and Great Northern Joint Railway in the 1880s on the line between Melton Constable and Norwich City.

The line closed to passengers in 1959. The former station site, on Station Road, is now a B&B, caravan site and furniture joinery.

== History ==
Opened by the Lynn and Fakenham Railway, it became a Midland and Great Northern Joint Railway station. During the Grouping of 1923 it converted to a joint operation of the London, Midland and Scottish Railway and the London and North Eastern Railway with the latter taking sole operation in 1936.

The station then passed on to the Eastern Region of British Railways on nationalisation in 1948, and was closed by the British Transport Commission.

The route of the former railway line is now part of the Marriott's Way leisure trail.

Former Services

Preceding station	Disused railways	Following station
Drayton	Midland and Great Northern; Norwich Branch	Lenwade

== See also ==
- List of closed railway stations in Norfolk
