= Eyn =

Eyn or EYN may refer to:

- Church of the Brethren in Nigeria (Hausa: Ekklesiyar Yan'uwa a Nigeria)
- Eynsford railway station, in England
- River Ainse (or Eyn), in England
- Ayin, the sixteenth letter of the Semitic abjads
- Eyn, an American experimental rock musician
