= Lenwade =

Village in Norfolk, England

Coordinates: 52.7212°N 1.1103°E

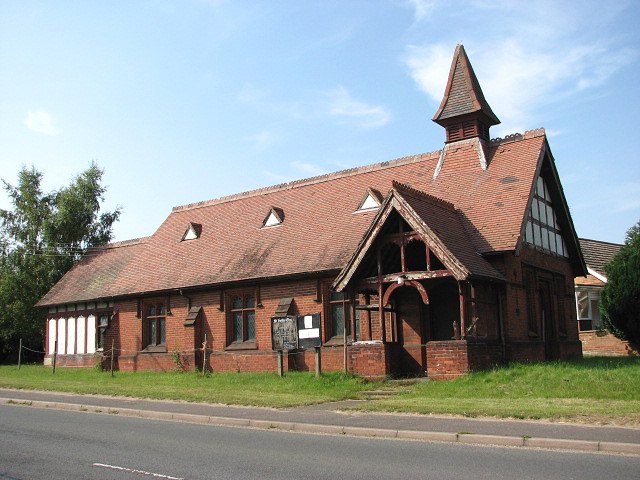
- St Faith's church

- Location within Norfolk
- Population: 542 (2021)
- OS grid reference: TG1002718303
  - London: 123 miles (198 km)
- Civil parish: Great Witchingham
- District: Broadland
- Shire county: Norfolk
- Region: East
- Country: England
- Sovereign state: United Kingdom
- Post town: Norwich
- Postcode district: NR9
- Dialling code: 01603
- Police: Norfolk
- Fire: Norfolk
- Ambulance: East of England
- UK Parliament: Mid Norfolk

Lenwade is a village in the civil parish of Great Witchingham, Norfolk, situated in the Wensum Valley adjacent to the A1067 road 14 miles (23 km) south-east of Fakenham and some 11 miles (18 km) north-west of Norwich. The River Ainse (or Eyn) joins the Wensum at Lenwade. It had a population of 542 in 2021.

== Etymology ==
The name may mean 'ford of the slowly moving river'. The first element possibly means lane in the Scottish dialect sense of 'scarcely moving river'. The second element of the name is the Old English gewæd (ford).

== Industry and the local economy ==
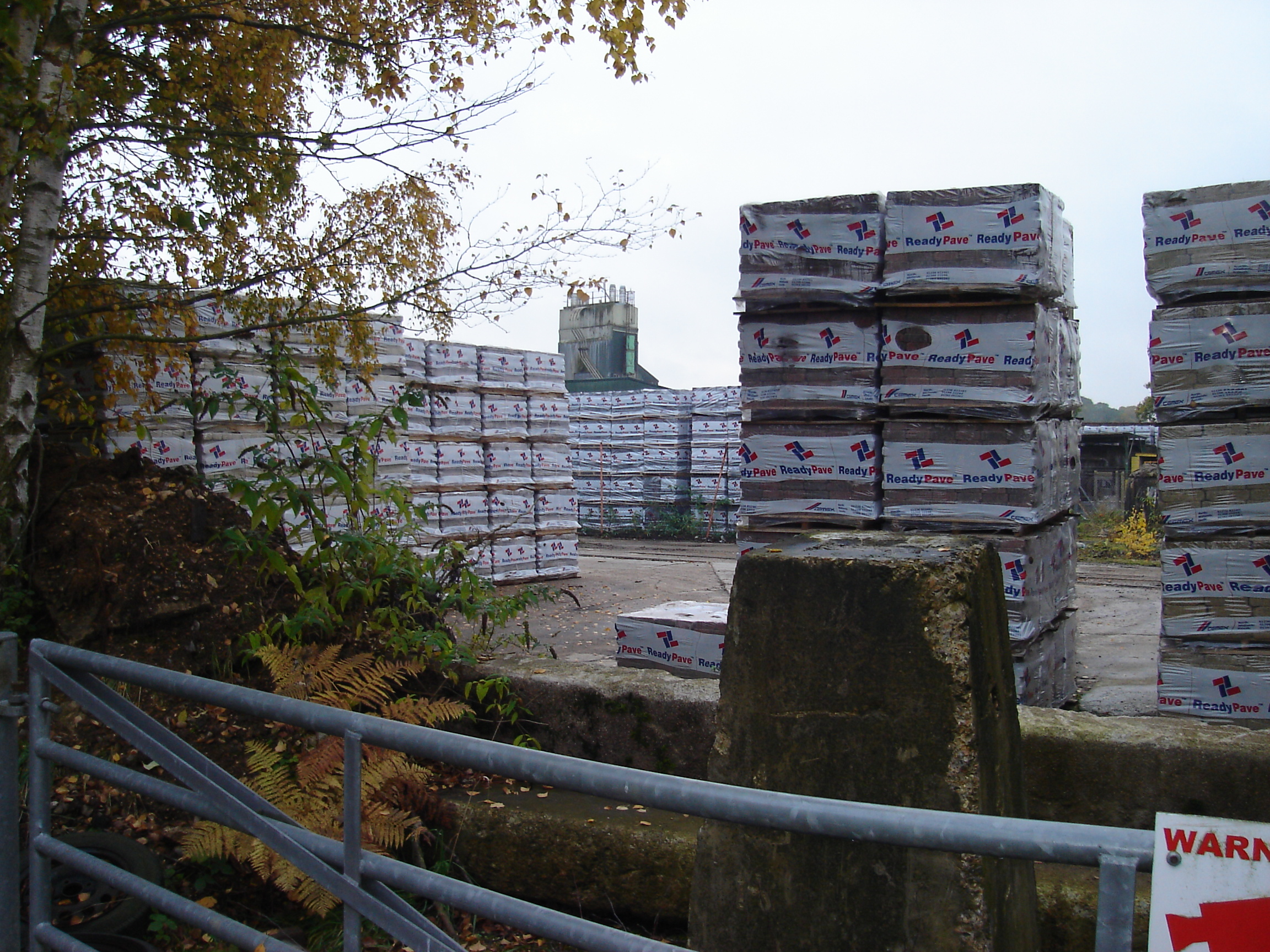
Concrete products

Much of the surrounding land is used for agriculture. However, due to its geographical location Lenwade became the centre of the sand and gravel extraction and the manufacturing of concrete products in the Wensum valley during the middle to late 20th century. The legacy of this activity can be seen in the many flooded gravel pits in the area. Today, these now mature lakes are popular with anglers, naturalists and bird watchers.

Industry today is concentrated to the southeast of Lenwade between the A1067 road and the former railway line. Concrete products, metal recycling, joinery and double glazing items are produced in the area.

Local tourist attractions include Roarr!, a dinosaur park and former animal park, as well as The Bug Parc which opened in 2022.

== The Church of St Faith ==
Located on the busy A1067 Fakenham Road, the building started life as a Victorian mission church originally dedicated to All Saints. Despite its central location the church was little used and became redundant. Today, the church is fenced off and planned to become a residential development (July 2008).

== Amenities ==
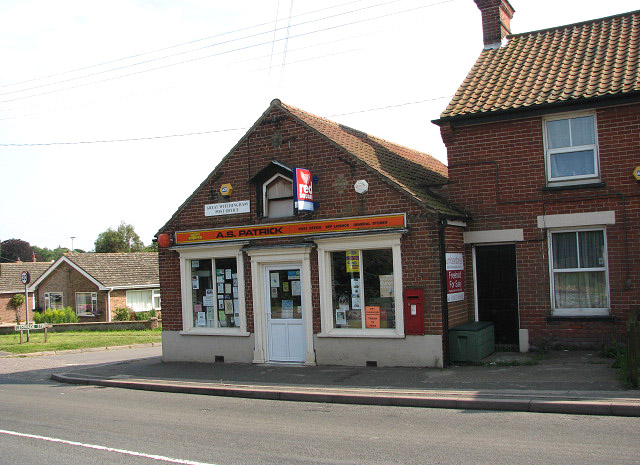
The post office

Amenities in the village include a village hall, primary school, doctor's surgery, general stores, garage, tea-rooms, butchers, bakers and a fish and chip shop.

Located close to A1067 and the River Wensum is the late 18th century Bridge Inn public house. The pub garden adjoins The Bridge Lakes (former gravel pits) and a section of the river where angling is possible. Matthew Brettingham's c.1741 triple arched brick bridge is depicted on the pub's sign. The bridge was demolished in 1993 and replaced by today's steel bridge.

== Lenwade mill ==
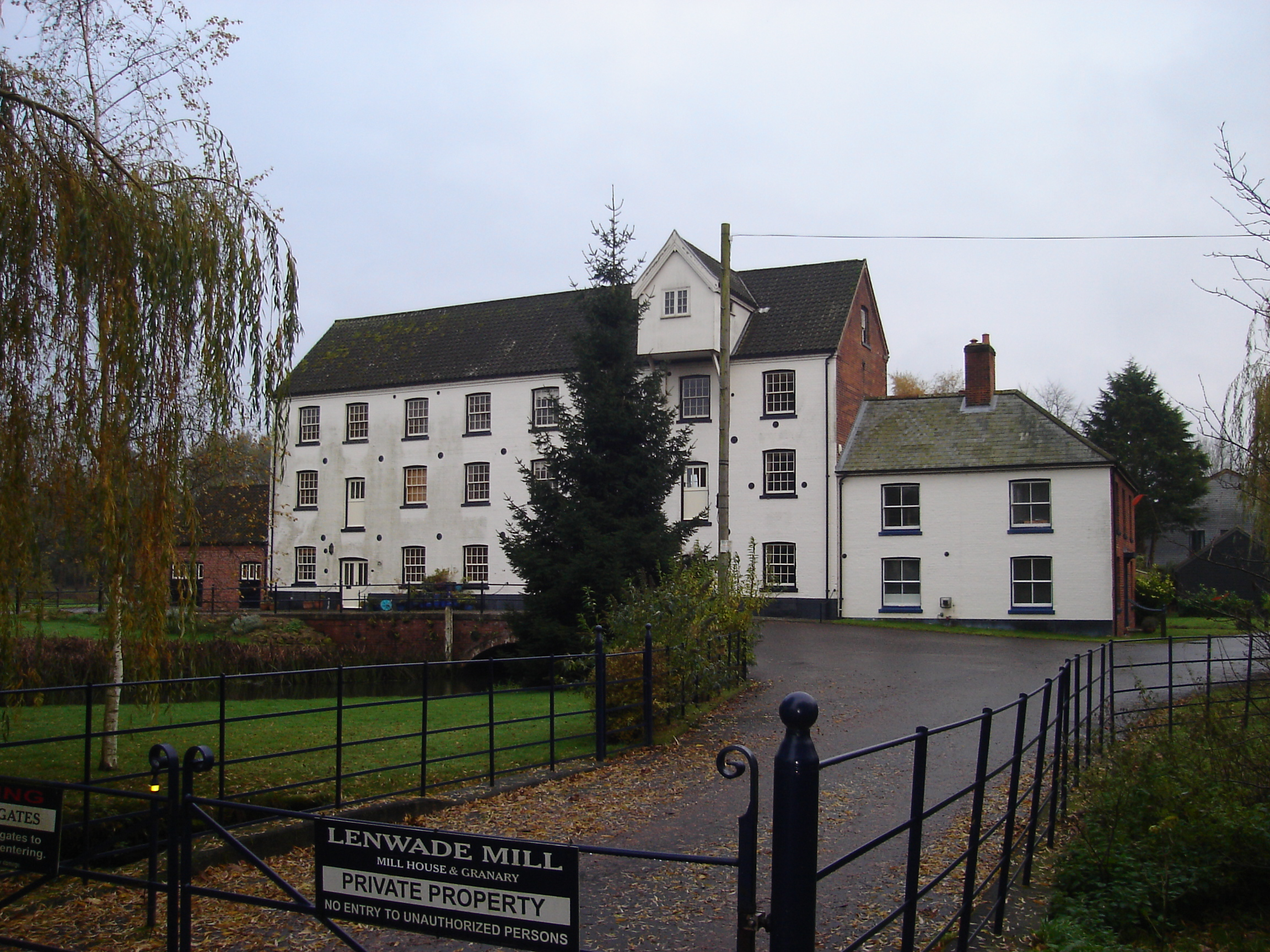
The mill

There has been a watermill on the river at Lenwade for many centuries. The present building, dating from the late 19th century, has been converted to homes.

== Railway history ==
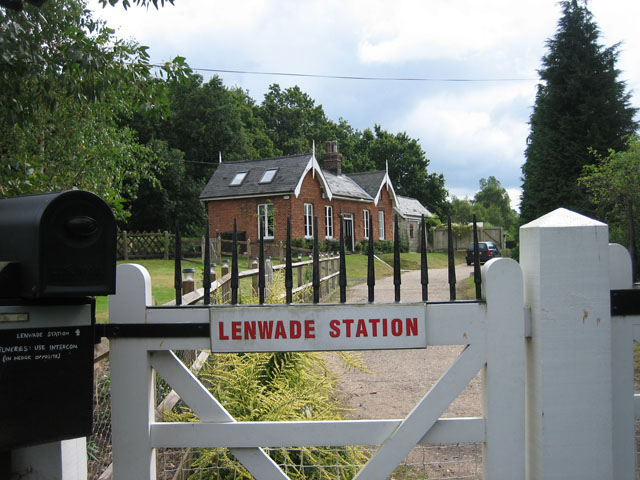
The former Lenwade railway station

Lenwade railway station was built in 1882 with direct trains to Norwich and King's Lynn. Passenger traffic ceased in 1959, but due to Lenwade's important Anglian cement and concrete works, the freight line was kept open to 1985. The former station today is a private residence and the track bed forms part of the Marriott's Way long-distance footpath.
