= Taverham High School =

Location
- Beech Avenue; Taverham, Norfolk, NR8 6HP; England; 52°41′11″N 1°11′14″E

Information
- Type: Academy
- Motto: Inspire | Empower | Achieve
- Established: 1979
- Department for Education URN: 139487 Tables
- Ofsted: Reports
- Chair of Governors: Susan Byles
- Headteacher: Gareth Yassin
- Gender: Coeducational
- Age: 11 to 18
- Enrolment: 1156
- Houses: Mars | Jupiter | Neptune | Earth
- Website: http://www.taverhamhigh.norfolk.sch.uk/

Taverham High School is a secondary school and sixth form with academy status, located in Taverham in the English county of Norfolk. As well as serving Taverham, the school has a catchment area that includes the adjoining villages of Drayton, Costessey and Ringland.

The school was first established in September 1979, and was based at Hellesdon High School for its first academic year before relocating to the present campus. The school converted to academy status in April 2013, and was previously a community school under the direct control of Norfolk County Council with specialist Sports College status. The school continues to coordinate with Norfolk County Council for admissions.

The school has its own sixth form provision. Taverham previously had a shared sixth form provision with Hellesdon High School, however this was phased out in September 2014.

The sixth form now specialises in a wide range of subjects from the creative industries to the sciences with specialist teachers and a wide range of equipment/rooms.

== Notable former pupils ==
- Cathy Dennis, singer-songwriter, record producer and actress.
