= Drayton railway station =

Former railway station in Norfolk, England

Coordinates: 52.6750°N 1.2206°E

Drayton
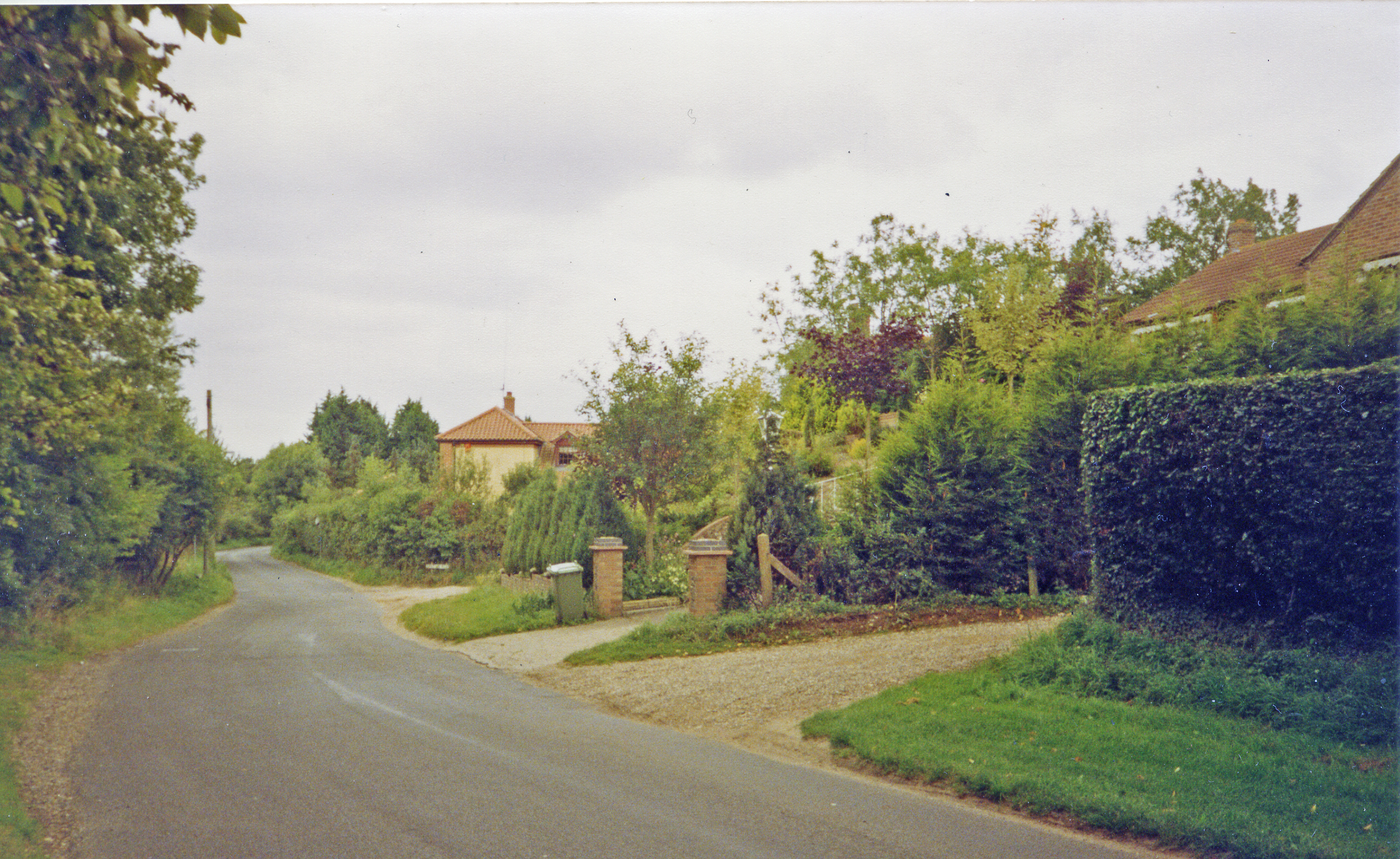
- The site of the station in 1993

General information
- Location: Drayton, Norfolk; England
- Grid reference: TG178134
- Platforms: 2

Other information
- Status: Disused

History
- Original company: Lynn and Fakenham Railway
- Pre-grouping: Midland and Great Northern Joint Railway

Key dates
- 2 December 1882: Opened as Costessey and Drayton
- 1 February 1883: Renamed Drayton
- before 1903: Renamed Drayton for Costessey
- 2 March 1959: Closed
Location

Drayton railway station is a former station in Norfolk, England. Constructed by the Midland and Great Northern Joint Railway in the 1880s, on the line between Melton Constable and Norwich, it was closed to passengers in 1959. It served the settlement of Drayton now on the outskirts of Norwich. The site is now home to an industrial site. Many of the buildings follow the old footings of the platform and other buildings. Several of the railway bridges in this area have been filled in or removed. The footings for the bridge entering Drayton from Norwich is now a house. Its former site is now on Marriott's Way.

Former Services

Preceding station	Disused railways	Following station
Hellesdon	Midland and Great Northern; Norwich Branch	Attlebridge
