= Rackheath Eco-town =

Proposed residential development in Norfolk, England

Coordinates: 52.676°N 1.382°E

The Rackheath Eco-town is a proposal for just over 5,000 houses to be built in the Rackheath area, in Norfolk, within a mile of The Broads National Park. The controversial proposals have been featured on many programmes, including BBC One's Politics Show, BBC One's Look East, ITV's Anglia Tonight and a BBC One Norwich North By-Election Special.

== History ==
The site was used for agricultural purposes until 1943 when an airfield, RAF Rackheath, was constructed and used by the United States Army Air Force Eighth Air Force. The airfield was closed at the end of war in 1945 and the land was returned to farming with most of the runways and taxiways being broken up for aggregate. Some buildings were retained and now form part of Rackheath Industrial Estate.

In the late 1990s, a large residential development was planned for the Rackheath and Salhouse area, but after public consultation, this did not progress any further.

The government launched a programme to build a number of sustainable green new towns in 2007 and invited proposals. The plan was to build up to 200,000 new homes on government-owned land in the greenbelt by 2020. To allow the settlements to be built in this timescale the plans would not have to go through the standard planning process.

The proposal to develop the Rackheath site as an eco-community was presented by Building Partnerships, who represent the land owners, and Barratt Homes. The proposal was considered by personnel from the Low Carbon Innovation Centre at the University of East Anglia, which comprises Carbon Connections and the Community Carbon Reduction Programme (CRed). Since the original proposal LCIC has offered technical support to the project.

Prior to their involvement with Rackheath, LCIC had investigated the eco-town proposal for Coltishall and decided not to become involved.

In June 2009, the site was given the go-ahead from the Government, after receiving an A-grade listing, meaning the location would be generally suitable for an eco-town. The proposals would still have to go through the planning process, where they would meet the fierce opposition of many local residents and political parties.

The plans for the Rackheath Eco Town have now been superseded by the Rackheath Masterplan to build a development including up to 4000 new homes, a secondary school and two new primary schools, an employment area, waste recycling, recreation grounds and a health and social care facility. Provision for new road infrastructure was also required. However it seems that these plans are, as at Feb 2021, now in doubt as two of the original consortium partners have withdrawn due to the delay caused by the successful high court challenge preventing over development on the Norfolk Broads. This challenge was brought by the SNUB campaign group led by Stephen Heard who was shortlisted as a finalist in the 2010 SMK Campaigner Awards in Local Campaigner

== Location ==
The plans consist of over 4000 houses to be built in the Rackheath area. The proposed area stretches from the Rackheath Industrial Estate, past Salhouse railway station to Stonehouse Road, Salhouse, and is approximately 3 square miles (7.8 km^{2}) or nearly 8 square kilometres in size. The site is also within a mile of The Broads National Park, where many forms of wildlife can be found, including the Norfolk hawker dragonfly, the swallowtail butterfly.

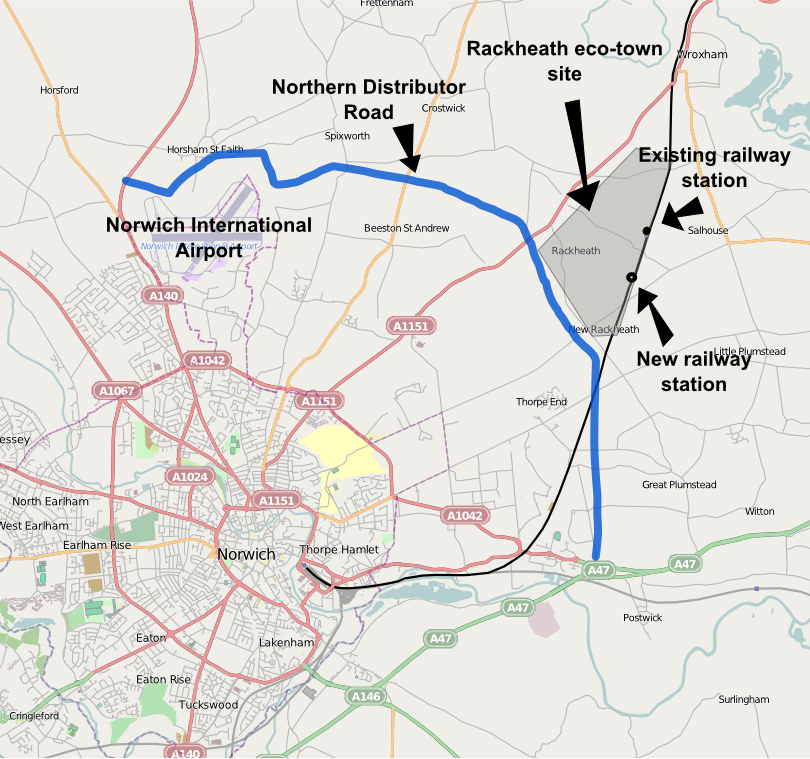
A map showing the location of the proposed settlement in relation to local transport links

== Transport ==
The development will be well connected to the road network. The A1151 road runs to the west of the settlement and the proposed Norwich Northern Distributor Road dual-carriageway (NDR) which would run to the south and link the settlement with the A47 road to the east and the A140 road / Norwich International Airport to the west.

A new rail station is proposed for the development, on the Bittern Line with an aim of offering a 15-minute service to central Norwich during peak times.

== Controversy ==
=== Lack of democratic process ===
Professor David Lock claimed that ministers were planning to "crash the planning process" to build the eco-towns. In a poll conducted by Rackheath parish council, only 10% of the 2000 residents contacted responded, with 71% of them against an ecotown. Rackheath featured on a Look East by-election special in front of a live local audience during which Stewart White conducted a poll of the audience, with only 6 people in favour of the eco-town, and the rest of the audience against it. Campaigners also feel that their local parish councils and district councils have not taken their view on the situation into account and have just made decisions based on Government ideas, although there is no evidence to support this.

One person close to the Eco-towns scheme, who does not wish to be named, has said: ‘It goes something like this. Someone told the Department of Communities and Local Government (DCLG): “Why don’t you propose greenfield sites in the middle of nowhere and call them eco-towns. It will be a great way of beating the system and getting over regional planning guidance”.’ Another said, "We know this area is designated for housing and would urge all concerned to ensure that the development is low carbon and acts as an exemplar." In addition, the local authority in which Rackheath sits, Broadland District Council, believes that an exemplar development, that includes energy efficient homes and encourages sustainable living will provide a higher quality development for existing and future Rackheath residents. Many campaigners and local residents have simply replied stating that they live in this area because of the peace, tranquillity and rural setting and building a development, however energy efficient, will decrease their quality of life. The campaigners also say that building a large housing estate on a greenfields site, even if it is energy efficient, will harm the environment more than if it was left as farmland.

The Town and Country Planning Association has come under scrutiny, after it lobbied strongly for the eco-towns and also happens to include in its subscribed membership, many of the developers who are bidding for the scheme. As a result, the TCPA have also been accused of an alleged conflict of interest, since some of its leaders acted as consultants to eco-town bidders. Peter Hall, a TCPA member and distinguished planner, is known to be very uncomfortable that the eco-towns are to be fast-tracked through the planning system, especially as the TCPA are an organisation that have prided itself on the importance of local consultation.

Many campaigners, including people close to the eco-town scheme, have stated that many eco-towns are 'dead in the water', and that getting even single development of 10,000-plus homes anywhere in England without a consultation process is unlikely and wrong. On the other hand, most people accept the need for more housing and believe developments should be low carbon.

A number of local opposition groups have been established to fight the development including SNUB (Stop Norwich Urbanisation) and RETAG (Rackheath Eco Town Action Group). The issue has been highlighted in the Norwich North by-election in July 2009 where the conservative candidate objected to the control exercised by central government and other candidates criticised the use of the 'eco' label. A petition was created on the Number 10 Downing Street e-petition website.

The Campaign to Protect Rural England however felt that Rackheath was one of less damaging of the initial list of 15 sites Many campaigners share the view that just because Rackheath achieved the best rating out of the 10 sites chosen, doesn't mean that it is a good site. Other locations have been suggested by campaigners, such as Postwick, as they provide a better location with better transport links such as railway line, river, dual carriageway, a Park and Ride depot as well as a large business park. There has however been no consultation of the people of Postwick.

=== Car-dependent transport ===
The transport page of the official Rackheath eco-town website highlights the new railway station, the proposed cycle routes and the bus gates and other initiatives to reduce car dependency. It also notes that the government requirement to reduce single occupancy car-based transport by 50% would be a challenge.

The development is just to the north of the Norwich Northern Distributor Road which would link the new-town to Norwich International Airport and the A47 road.

Local campaigners said that relying on a "brand new dual carriageway" (the NDR) for the scheme would make it unsustainable.

=== Rail improvements ===
The current rail service does not allow room for an extra station to be added to the line, due to the length of single track along the line and the current signalling network. The service at Salhouse is hourly during peak hours and two-hourly during off-peak hours.
