= Norwich Northern Distributor Road =

Road in England

Coordinates: 52.67513°N 1.36042°E

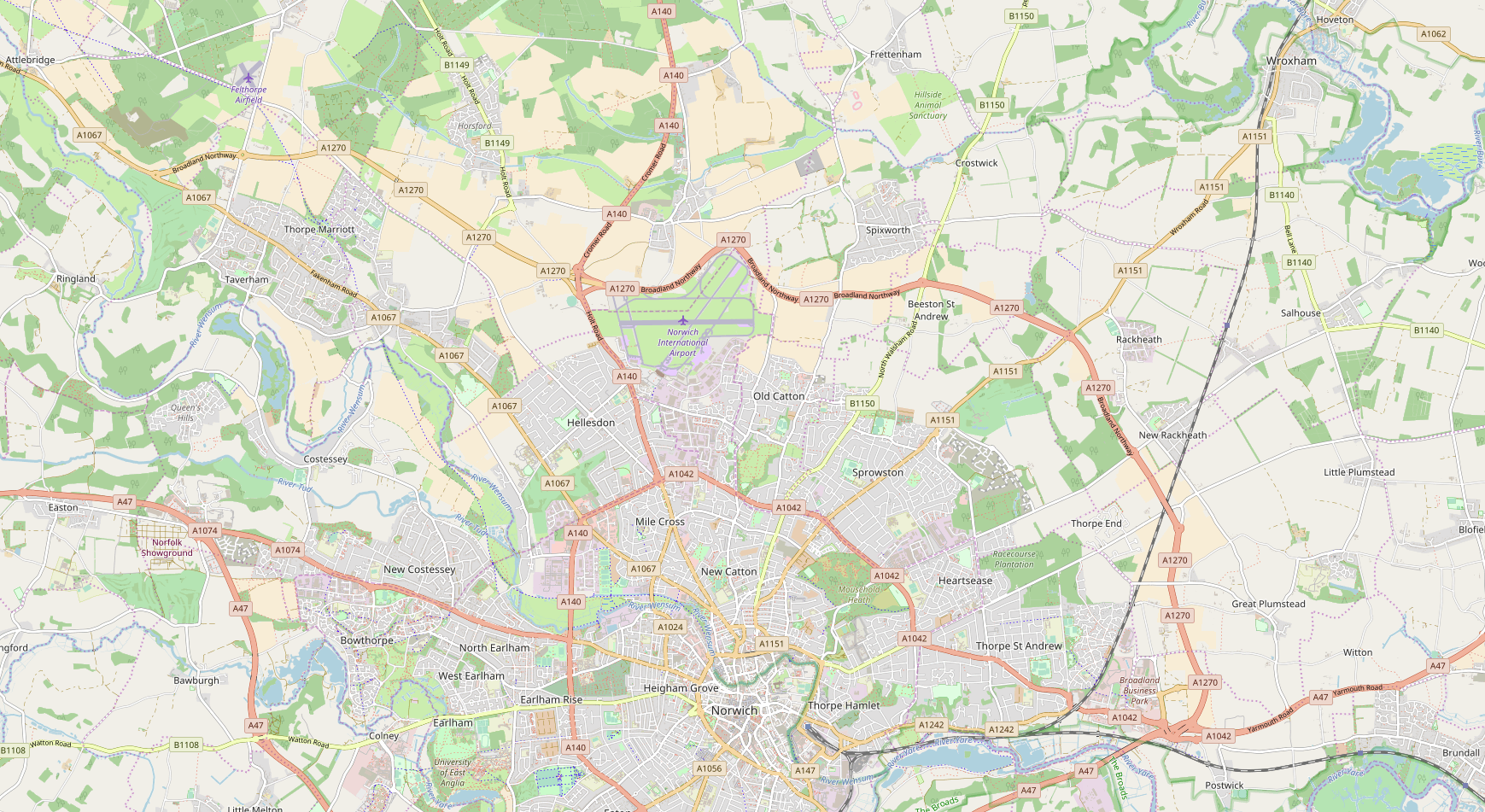
- Route of the completed NDR Broadland Northway
- Location: Norwich
- Proposer: Norfolk County Council
- Cost estimate: £178.5M (July 2017)
- Start date: December 2015
- Completion date: March 2018 (Opened 17 April)
- Stakeholders: Campaign for Better Transport, No to N25, Norfolk County Council

The Norwich Northern Distributor Road, now officially named the Broadland Northway (but commonly known as the NDR) is a 12.4 miles (20.0 km) dual-carriageway linking the A47 to the south east of the city to the proposed Rackheath Eco-town and Norwich International Airport to the north of Norwich before finishing at the A1067 Fakenham Road to the north west of the city. The road is designated the A1270, and in Spring 2018 was named the Broadland Northway.

It was given 'Programme Entry' status by the Department for Transport in December 2009. On 2 June 2015 the scheme was given the final go ahead, the road was completed on 17 April 2018, the western section having opened in late 2017.

The project was initially for a road from the A47 to the west of Norwich at Easton passing to the north of the city and linking to the A47 to the east near Postwick. The project was later scaled back to start at the A1067 road.

Norfolk County Council has announced that it is committed to providing the final section from the A1067 to the A47 at Easton to the west of Norwich, with the project being called the Norwich Western Link, and has made its delivery one of its three main Highways Objectives (2017) committing £400,000 for further investigation of a potential route.

== Description ==
The road has three distinct sections outlined below:

=== Postwick Hub ===
The £21 million Postwick Hub scheme at the start of the NDR road is in the district of Broadland to the east of Norwich and includes development of the A47/A1042 junction and also a further 500 parking places at the Postwick Park and ride (one of six Norwich park and ride sites).

=== A47 (Postwick) to the A140 ===
This is a dual carriageway road approximately 8.7 miles long. At its western end it starts at the A140 Cromer Road at a new grade separated junction, close to Norwich Airport. The route heads eastwards to pass to the south of communities of Horsham St Faith, Spixworth and Rackheath before joining the A47 Trunk Road at the existing Postwick Interchange. New at-grade roundabouts have been constructed where the NDR crosses the main radial roads linking the north and north east of Norfolk to Norwich city centre.

=== A140 to A1067 section ===
This section of dual carriageway east of the above section runs to the A1067. When the Department for Transport (DfT) decision on the shorter NDR was announced in December 2009, Adrian Gunson, cabinet member for planning and transportation, said that the council would seek planning permission for its preferred route from the A140 to the A1067 in the hope that funding could be secured at a later date. No other funding being found, Norfolk County Council elected to fund this section of the road itself from its own funds.

=== Norwich Western Link (NWL) ===
When the DfT decision on the shorter NDR was announced in December 2009 there were calls from councillors for the section between the A1067 at Attlebridge and the A47 at Easton to also be built, known as the Norwich Western Link.

This project remains in the public eye because its delivery is contested.

- Proponents (such as conservative politician Charlotte Salomon) consider it important to complete the Norwich Northern Bypass as it would complete the Northern Distributor Road around the north of Norwich, giving the industrial areas in the north of the city and Norwich Airport access to the A47 travelling towards the west of the county and onwards.
- Opponents (such as the Liberal Democratic and Green Parties in Norwich) cite a number of myths about the benefits of the Norwich Western Link and various objections to the project, in particular that in order for the project to move ahead it needs to get a bat mitigation licence from Natural England as there is a super colony of rare barbastelle bats in woodland in the path of the proposed road. Without this, the building work would be illegal.

In early 2017 Norfolk County Council voted to make this project one of its three top highway priorities and £400,000 was made available to explore how the NDR could join the A47 to the west of Norwich. Consultants Mouchel have been brought in to progress the scheme and discussions have taken place with Natural England and the Environment Agency.

In early 2021, the project was priced at £153 million however in 2023 the costs were reported to have escalated to £274 million; some estimates suggest that the costs could reach nearer £400 million when the costs of borrowing have been factored in.

In August 2024, a consultation on the controversial proposal concluded, with government advisers lodging a formal objection which appears to have finally ended hopes for the extension.

== History ==
In 2005 Norfolk County Council persuaded the East of England regional assembly to add the road to the Regional Spatial Strategy as a late inclusion describing it as 'Norwich Northern Distributor road to improve access to the airport and development to the north of the city'. They also indicated that they would need to perform an environmental impact assessment, the realism of the cost estimates but had not decided on a route.

In March 2006 Norfolk CC then deferred the decision to consult on the route due to environmental concerns by English Nature and the Environment Agency regarding the western end of the route where it would pass through the Wensum Valley.

In August 2005 the council published their preferred route for the section from the A1067 to the A47 road in the east, but left open the possibility that the section from the A1067 to the A47 to the west of Norwich would not be included due to the objections relating to the Wensum Valley.

In September 2005 the council dropped the section to the west of the A1067 from the proposal.

In November 2005 the application by Norfolk County Council for funding from the Transport Innovation Fund was turned down.

In December 2005 the road the East of England plan was examined in public with representations against the NDR from the Norwich & Norfolk Transport Action Group, Friends of the Earth and the Campaign to Protect Rural England.

In June 2006 the report from the examination of the East of England Spatial Strategy recommended that the road should be dropped, citing the lack of consultation as the main reason and in March 2007 the Secretary of State accepted the decision and published her intended changes to the East of England Plan without the NDR.

During 2007, The Department of Communities and Local Government (CLG) announced a competition to build up to 10 eco-towns.

September 2007: The government intervenes to block Norfolk Council's proposal to award any contract to build the road without going through a competitive tendering process.

In August 2008 Norfolk county council propose Rackheath Eco-town as the site for one of the new 'eco-towns'.

During the autumn of 2008 the council suggested that there would be a public inquiry in September 2009 with construction starting early in 2011 and completion by the end of 2012.

While the East of England allocated RFA revenue to the road in February 2009, the Department for Transport warned in July 2009 that "given the fiscal uncertainty, increasing carbon constraints and DaSTS work in hand, a 10-year programme [of funding] must necessarily remain provisional at this stage."

Local Transport Today reported in April 2009 that the Department for Transport had "voiced concerns" about the scheme and suggested that the council might like to submit an alternative layout for an associated project, the Postwick Hub, which did not include the NDR. £21 million had been allocated to the Postwick Hub through the Community Infrastructure Fund, conditional on the distributor road also receiving funding. John Dowie, director of regional and local transport delivery for the DfT, said that "It would be open to Norfolk to review the Postwick Junction design and prepare an alternative option that is less dependent on the NNDR".

In June 2009, the site was given the go-ahead from the Government, after receiving an A-grade listing, meaning the location would be generally suitable for an eco-town Local campaigners said that relying on the NDR would make it unsustainable.

In August 2009 the longer scheme to the A1067 was expected to cost £117m. £69m (60% of the estimated cost) was expected to come from the Regional Funding Allocation (RFA) and the remaining £47.5m to be sought from Norwich Growth Point infrastructure funding, the Community Infrastructure Fund and developer contributions.

In December 2009 the Department for Transport approved the project giving it 'Program Entry' status, but only for the section of road from the A140 by Norwich Airport and the A47 to the east of Norwich and suggested dates of early 2013 for a start to construction with completion in 2015. They also approved the Postwick Hub development.

In May 2010 Local Transport Today revealed that, as part of the Government's drive to cut spending, all major transport schemes are being reviewed with an eye to reduce spending. This includes the Norwich Northern Distributor Road.

In October 2010 Philip Hammond revealed that the scheme would be one of those competing for funding at the end of 2011 to be part of the second wave of transport projects given the go ahead by the coalition government.

In late October 2010 Graham Plant, cabinet member for transport and travel at Norfolk County Council, told the Eastern Daily Press that the NDR was being reviewed because of budget cuts. He also explained that it was likely to lead to cuts to the core bus network and park and ride. "What we need to know is what are residents' priorities," he said. "We have looked at all the arguments for and against the NDR and the Postwick Hub. But I am well aware there are people who that doesn’t affect at all living in the rural hinterland, who need a bus service."

On 2 June 2015 the Norwich Northern Distributor Road was given the go ahead with work started in December 2015.

On 20 July 2017 the Holt Road/Reepham Road link road near the A140 was opened, allowing the Holly Lane road to be closed and major work carried out on the junction between the Cromer Road and the NDR.

On 11 November 2017, the first stretch between the A1067 Fakenham Road and A140 Cromer Road was opened.

The central section from the A140 to the A1151 Wroxham Road opened on 21 December 2017.

The final section linking the A1151 with the A47 at Postwick opened on 17 April 2018. Problems around the Rackheath section, mainly to do with a bridge over a railway line, delayed work on the eastern section.

== Scheme objectives ==
The scheme objectives, as laid out in the Major Scheme Business Case, are to:

- Reduce congestion on strategic routes to the north of the city
- Reduce noise, air pollution and accidents for communities in the northern suburbs of Norwich and outlying villages
- Enable the removal of through traffic from the city centre, and implementation of widespread pedestrianisation/bus priority measures
- Provide direct access to growth locations, helping to deliver significant housing and employment growth as set out in the EEP RSS/RTS
- Support the continued success of the Norwich economy as the driver to growth across the north of the region
- Provide improved access to north and north east Norfolk

The Greater Norwich Development Partnership, a non-departmental public body which includes Norfolk County Council and Norwich City Council, has described the dual carriageway as "an integral part of our plans to improve the local public transport network and reduce reliance on the private car."

The road was rated priority 'A1' by the East of England Regional Assembly and strongly supported by Norfolk County Council.

== Environmental impact ==
The local Green Party candidate highlighted that the road would generate an addition 25,000 tonnes of CO_{2} emissions in the first year.

Norfolk County Council have described the scheme as having 'large adverse' impacts on several protected species, including barn owls and bats and a 'moderate adverse' impact on landscape.

The road has seven bat bridges, intended to mitigate the impact on local bat populations, which were criticised by Liz Truss in her memoir Ten Years to Save the West.

== Opposition ==
The road was the focus of a long running UK road protest from a local campaign group and was also opposed by the Campaign for Better Transport, a public transport advocacy group.

Campaign for Better Transport executive director Stephen Joseph criticised the scheme as poor use of funding when the DfT revealed the Norwich Northern Distributor Road was going ahead, while the Sustainable Travel Cities and Kickstart Bus programs were suspended.

Despite the route having been changed so that it no longer crosses the River Wensum (a Site of Special Scientific Interest), some opponents argue that there would be pressure to extend the road across the valley in the future, see Norwich Western Link.

== See also ==
- Road protest in the United Kingdom
