= Dave Bussey =

British radio DJ (born 1952)

- Born: Dave Bussey; 4 October 1952 (age 73); Drayton, England
- Occupation: Radio broadcaster
- Notable credit: Dog Eat Dog (Voice Over)

Dave Bussey (born 4 October 1952) is an English radio disc jockey who, until March 2008, presented The Dave Bussey Show on BBC Radio Lincolnshire.

== Early life ==
He was born in Drayton, Norfolk and grew up in Norwich, attending a secondary modern school. He joined the Royal Navy, becoming an electrician on nuclear submarines.

== Broadcasting ==
Dave Bussey started his career on Radio Forth (Edinburgh) before spending five years at Radio Tay (Dundee and Perth). One show he presented was The Sunday Challenge but was used as a relief presenter for most other programmes. Bussey spent a year at Northsound Radio (Aberdeen) He was a weekend presenter on BBC Radio 2. While there he also broadcast with BBC Cambridgeshire and BBC Three Counties. He joined BBC Radio Lincolnshire, taking over from John Inverdale in 1986.

He left BBC Radio Lincolnshire in March 2008. A spokesman for the BBC said: "There have been no compulsory redundancies at Radio Lincolnshire but some presenters are leaving the station as part of a wide-ranging package of scheduling changes." He was a broadcaster for a few months with SMOOTH Radio before their reorganisation. He is currently helping with training at Lincoln City Radio (Community Radio Station) He taught media skills at The University of Lincoln for eight years before retiring in October 2017.

Bussey returned to BBC Radio Lincolnshire in 2014 taking over the 1-3pm slot on a Sunday from Judy Theobald.

== Personal life ==
Bussey lives in rural Lincolnshire (in Willingham By Stow) and plays in local golf matches.
