= Hellesdon High School =

Academy in Norwich, Norfolk, England

Location
- 187 Middletons Lane, Hellesdon; Norwich, Norfolk, NR6 5SB; England
- 52.6598°N 1.2564°E

Information
- Type: Academy
- Motto: Enjoy, Achieve, Succeed
- Established: c. 1937
- Trust: Wensum Trust
- Department for Education URN: 138039 Tables
- Ofsted: Reports
- Principal: Mike Earl & Helen Watts
- Staff: 50+
- Gender: Coeducational
- Age: 11 to 18
- Enrollment: 1,581 pupils
- Colours: Red, Blue, Black
- Website: https://www.wensumtrust.org.uk/hellesdonhigh

Hellesdon High School is a secondary school and, on site, is a sixth form with academy status in Hellesdon, Norfolk, England. The school is part of the Wensum Trust. The school changed its logo in March 2025.

The headmaster duties are handled by Mike Earl and Helen Watts as of 2025. The school incorporates 1,581 pupils with a capacity of 1290.

As of October 2023, the school holds a 'Requires Improvement' OFSTED rating.

== House system ==
Hellesdon High School has a house system; all students are split into 5 different houses, each led by a Head of House. Students can compete in House Competitions all academic year, and a trophy is presented to the winning house at the end of the summer term.

== Expansions ==
Over the years, there have been numerous expansions to the school buildings, which include:

- 3G Pitch (2006)
- Expansion of G Block (2007)
- Bike shelter (2007)
- Sports Hall (2007)
- Creation of K Block (2018)
- Expansion of K Block (2022)

== Sixth form ==
In the close of 2022, Hellesdon High School underwent a restructuring, resulting in the separation of its sixth form provision. The school previously housed both secondary and sixth form education on site. With this division, Hellesdon High School now operates independently alongside Hellesdon Sixth Form, each with its own identity and roles.

As part of this reorganisation, a new logo was introduced for Hellesdon Sixth Form, and the former Hellesdon High School building, known as F Block, was repurposed to accommodate the new sixth form.

Previously, the school shared a sixth form provision with Taverham High School, but this was phased out in September 2014.

== Notable staff and pupils ==
Silver plaque thanking Chris Sutton for funding the school

- Lionel Fanthorpe, television presenter, author and lecturer; Head of English and then Deputy Headteacher at the school 1972–1979
- Sam Sexton, professional boxer
- Chris Sutton, footballer; pupil at the school from 1986
- Mike Sutton, footballer
- Sophie Wright, cyclist
