= SNUB =

Non-profit organisation to stop the urbanisation of Norwich and surrounding areas

- Website type: Information site
- Available in: English
- Owner: SNUB
- Creator: SNUB
- Revenue: From Donations
- Website: www.snubcampaign.org
- Commercial: No
- Registration: None
- Launched: 22 January 2010
- Current status: Active

SNUB or Stop Norwich UrBanisation is a non-profit organisation based around Norwich, United Kingdom, whose aim is to stop the urbanisation of Norwich and its surrounding villages, such as Rackheath, Salhouse, Wroxham and Postwick.

The work of SNUB has received national coverage on BBC Radio 4's Farming Today programme and they have also received local coverage on television programmes such as BBC One's Politics Show, BBC One's Look East, ITV's Anglia Tonight and a BBC One Norwich North By-Election Special; and in local newspapers, such as the Eastern Daily Press and the Norwich Evening News.

In March 2012, after a successful legal challenge at the High Court, they announced that the actor Martin Shaw would become their official patron. In a press release, he announced that he was "simply furious and upset by your plight and that of all of us who wish to live in quiet and peace. I will be your Patron and keep fighting".

== Rackheath Eco-town ==
SNUB have worked alongside some local residents in protesting against the proposed Rackheath Eco-town, as they claim the plans are flawed and will lead to massive overdevelopment of the area.

An official petition on the 10 Downing Street petitions website was created by SNUB, and had nearly 300 online signatures (as of June 2010), and a paper petition with over 3000 signatures.

== Norwich Northern Distributor Road ==
SNUB opposed the Norwich Northern Distributor Road which some objectors called the "Road to Nowhere", as it no longer is planned to link up to Taverham and the A47.
