= Hellesdon railway station =

Former railway station in Norfolk, England

Coordinates: 52.6440°N 1.2468°E

Hellesdon
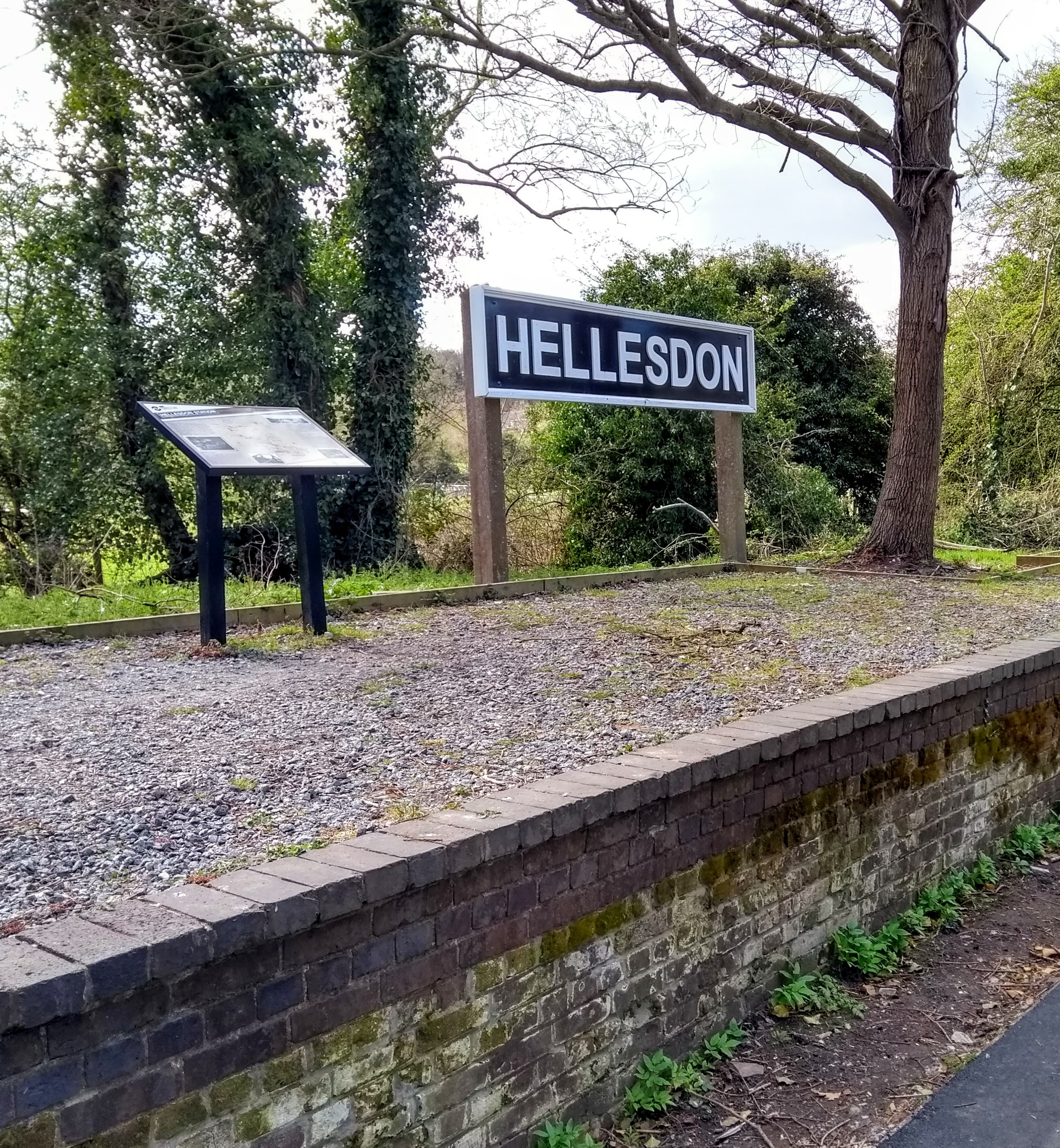
- The station in February 2022

General information
- Location: Hellesdon, Norfolk; England
- Grid reference: TG197101
- Platforms: 1

Other information
- Status: Disused

History
- Original company: Lynn and Fakenham Railway
- Pre-grouping: Midland and Great Northern Joint Railway

Key dates
- 2 December 1882: Opened
- 15 September 1952: Closed to passengers
- 13 July 1964: closed for freight
Location

Hellesdon railway station is a former railway station in Norfolk, England, which served the area of Hellesdon, today virtually an outer suburb of Norwich. It opened on 2 December 1882 and was closed on 15 September 1952, six years before passenger service was withdrawn along the rest of the line.

Parts of the platform walls still survive today on both sides of the tracks, however the station itself has long since been demolished and the site is extremely overgrown. An entrance gate next to the bridge spanning the River Wensum still exists. Many of the station's features are hidden in the undergrowth including fence posts, signal box foundations and telegraph poles. As the building was demolished, half of the platform was removed from the building end. The bridge was also removed to change the road plan.

In October 2010, the platform wall was cleared by the amateur group Friends of Norwich City Station (FONCS), with the station name board posts visible. The surface of the platform and the cattle dock are planned to be cleared in the future.

A project to reclaim the station commenced in 2017 and was completed in the summer of 2018.

The railway's track bed forms part of Marriott's Way long distance footpath.

Preceding station	Disused railways	Following station
Norwich City; Line and station closed	Midland and Great Northern; Norwich Branch	Drayton; Line and station closed
