= Lenwade railway station =

Former railway station in Norfolk, England

Coordinates: 52.723°N 1.115°E

Lenwade
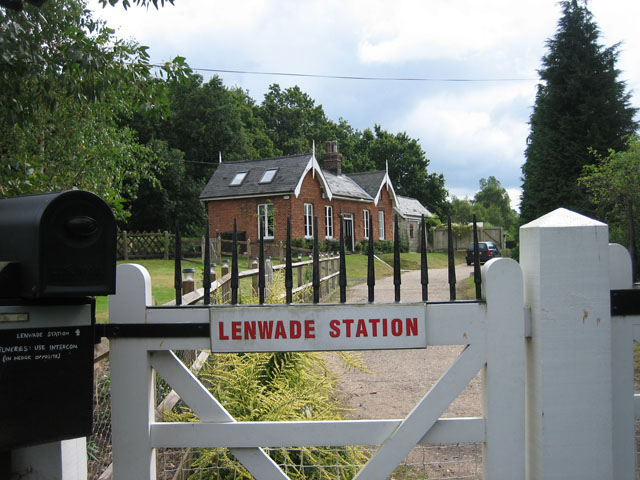

General information
- Location: Lenwade, Norfolk; England
- Platforms: 1

Other information
- Status: Disused

History
- Original company: Lynn and Fakenham Railway Company
- Pre-grouping: Midland and Great Northern Joint Railway

Key dates
- 1 July 1882: Opened
- 2 March 1959: Closed to passengers
- 1983: Closed to goods
Location

Lenwade railway station was a railway station in North Norfolk, England. It was built by the Lynn and Fakenham Railway Company in 1882 and taken over by the Midland and Great Northern Joint Railway (M&GNJR) in 1893, to serve the small hamlet of Lenwade. Despite the settlement's size, the railway provided a direct service to Norwich and King's Lynn. It closed to passengers in 1959, but remained open to goods trains until 1983.

The station is now on the route of Marriott's Way. The station is now a private residence and has been fully restored.

Former Services

| Preceding station | Disused railways | Following station |
|---|---|---|
| Attlebridge | Midland and Great Northern; Norwich Branch | Whitwell & Reepham |
