= Taverham =

Village in Norfolk, England

Coordinates: 52.68°N 1.20°E

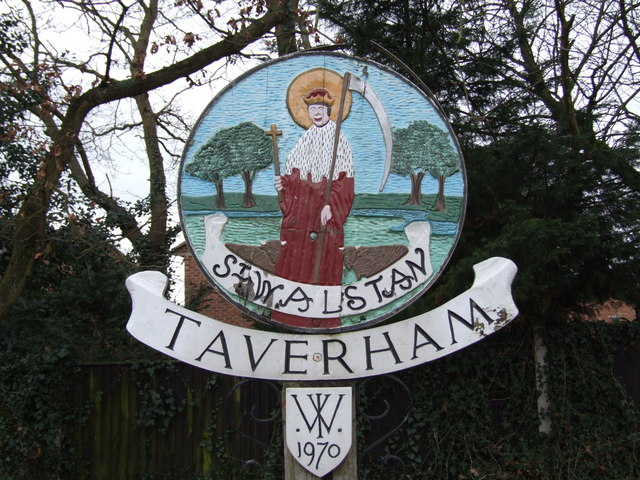
- Village sign, Taverham, showing St Walstan with his scythe

- Location within Norfolk
- Area: 8.70 km^{2} (3.36 sq mi)
- Population: 10,142 (2011 Census)
  - Density: 1,166/km^{2} (3,020/sq mi)
- OS grid reference: TG165145
- Civil parish: Taverham
- District: Broadland
- Shire county: Norfolk
- Region: East
- Country: England
- Sovereign state: United Kingdom
- Post town: NORWICH
- Postcode district: NR8
- Dialling code: 01603
- Police: Norfolk
- Fire: Norfolk
- Ambulance: East of England
- UK Parliament: Broadland and Fakenham

Taverham is a large village and civil parish in Norfolk, in England. It is approximately 5 miles (8 km) north-west of Norwich. Taverham sits on the River Wensum. Taverham forms part the wider Norwich Built-up area.

In 2001, Taverham had a population of 10,233. It has seen recent population growth with the building of Thorpe Marriott, a new residential development that straddles the boundary with the neighbouring village of Drayton. The patron saint of Taverham is St Walstan who according to legend lived and worked in the village in the 11th century. By 2013, the area of Taverham had an approximate population of 14,121.

== Amenities ==
Taverham has two state run infant schools: Ghost Hill Infant and Nursery School, and Nightingale First School, and a public (privately owned) prep school: Taverham Hall School. Taverham Junior School (formerly St Edmund's Middle School and Taverham Middle School) educates children between the ages of 7 and 11 years. Taverham High School, as well as serving Taverham, has a catchment area that includes the adjoining villages of Felthorpe and Ringland.

There are a variety of small shops in Taverham, and the Taverham Nursery Centre has a large selection of shops (such as craft, jewellery, paper, kitchenary, pine furniture etc.).

Taverham also has a village hall, library, recreational ground (park), church, scout and guide hut (which also serves as the home of the local day-care centre), several takeaway shops and two pubs: the Silver Fox and, in Thorpe Marriott, The Old Mill. Set in woodland on the Ringland Road, Taverham, is Roundwood, an indoor bowling centre with bar and function room.

Taverham Brass Band is based in the village, providing entertainment across Norfolk and beyond, and performing at the bi-annual "Proms in the Park" concert "Exploding Brass!" held at Taverham Hall. 2004 was the band's 30th anniversary year, with the first of the October concerts (15 October 2004) falling exactly 30 years to the day from the inaugural committee meeting.

2015 saw the 50th anniversary of the founding of the Taverham Newsletter. The Newsletter which is run by volunteers is delivered free also by volunteers to all the homes and businesses in Taverham.

== Church of St. Edmund ==
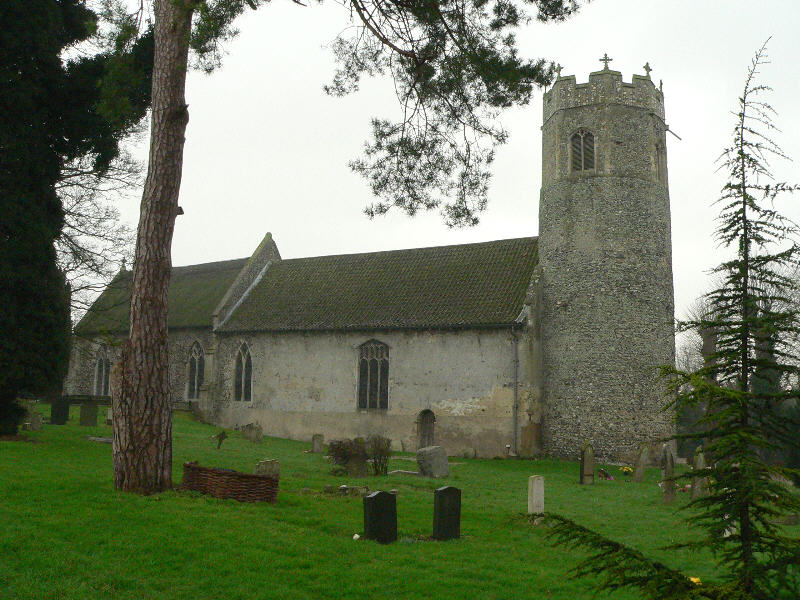
St. Edmund's Church, Taverham

Parts of St Edmund's Church are believed to be pre-Norman - part of the nave, and the slightly later base of the tower, also notable for its round body but octagonal top, where it had to be rebuilt. It is a Grade I listed building. A church was standing in Taverham in 1086 when it was listed in the Domesday survey.

== History ==
The villages name means 'Red homestead/village', perhaps referring to some decoration or a place where pigment was made. The exact location of the meeting-place of the Taverham hundred is unknown.

The first recorded mention of Taverham is thought to have been made in the time of Edward the Confessor. It also appears in the Domesday Book.

A school existed in Taverham very early on, from at least the 13th century.

In the 19th century Taverham was a major producer of paper. Some of the paper which was produced at Taverham Mill was used in producing The Times, Bank of England banknotes and the Oxford English Dictionary. It also served the University Press at Cambridge. In 1830 the paper mill, the property of the Ansted family and under the management of John Burgess, husband of Elizabeth Ansted, was attacked during the Swing Riots; a gardener, Robert West, was transported to Australia for his part in the riot. The mill closed in 1899.

On 5 October 1944, a V-2 rocket exploded in woods near Taverham.

== Local government representation ==
Taverham is part of Broadland District and is represented on Broadland District Council by four councillors covering two electoral wards. Taverham South Ward covers everything south of the Fakenham Road except Cypress Close and Highland Road. Taverham North Ward includes much of Thorpe Marriott, all of the parts of Taverham that are on the Fakenham Road and north of it, plus Highland Road and Cypress Close.

Taverham also has a county councillor representing the Taverham electoral division. This includes all of the Parish of Taverham.

== Notable residents ==
- As well as St. Walstan, the successful singer and songwriter Cathy Dennis and the tennis player and BBC commentator Chris Bailey lived in Taverham. Mel Clarke, paralympic archer also hails from Taverham. She has won Silver and Bronze Paralympic medals and Bronze in world championships.
