= River Ainse (or Eyn) =

River in Norfolk, England

River Ainse (Eyn)
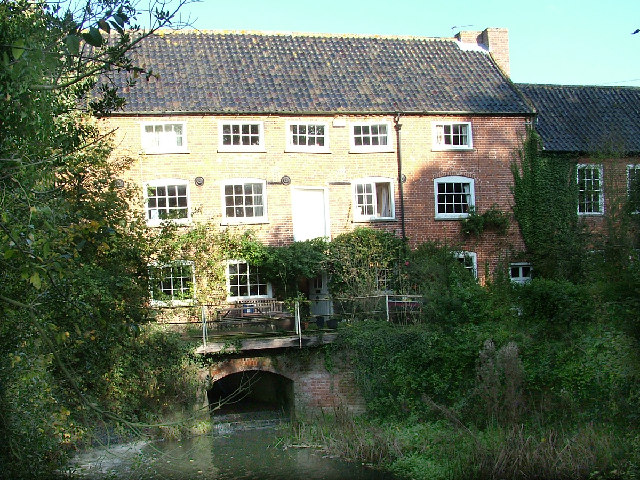
- Eade's Mill on the River Ainse(Eyn)

- Location of the river mouth within Norfolk

Location
- Country: England
- State: Norfolk
- Region: East of England
- District: Broadland

Physical characteristics
- Source
  - location: near Heydon
  - coordinates: 52.7880°N 1.0917°E
  - elevation: 47 m (154 ft)
- Mouth: River Wensum
  - location: Lenwade
  - coordinates: 52°43′30″N 01°7′13.5″E
  - elevation: 14 m (46 ft)
- Length: 14.2 km (8.8 mi)

The River Ainse (or Eyn) is a small river in the county of Norfolk. It is a tributary of the River Wensum which it merges with at Lenwade. The River Ainse has several tributaries also.

== Eade's watermill ==
The watermill located on the river at Great Witchingham is known as Eade's Mill. The mill was built in 1666. Until 1948 the waterwheel was still in working order. By 1972 the watermill was still being used as a hammer mill to grind up pig meal and was powered by electricity. Today, the watermill and its surrounding buildings are grade II listed. They consist of a red brick mill builing with an attached mill house, both with a roof of black galzed pantiles. Most of the visible remains date from the 18th century, as does a brick wall with coping stones linking the mill house to other outbuildings.

== See also ==
- List of rivers of England
