= Attlebridge =

Village in Norfolk, England

Coordinates: 52.71°N 1.15°E

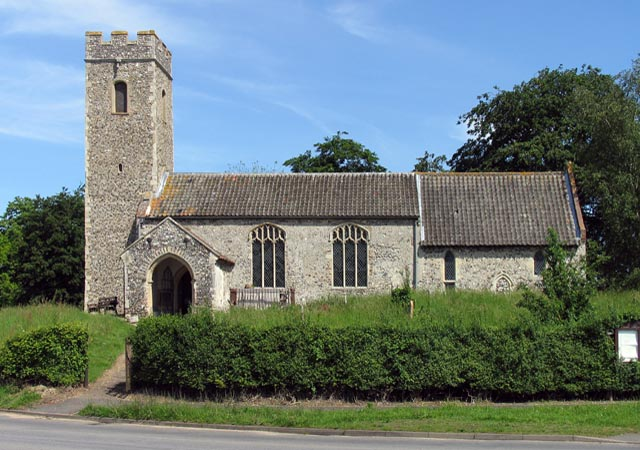
- St Andrew's church

- Location within Norfolk
- Area: 5.27 km^{2} (2.03 sq mi)
- Population: 223 (2011)
  - Density: 42/km^{2} (110/sq mi)
- OS grid reference: TG128168
- Civil parish: Attlebridge
- District: Broadland
- Shire county: Norfolk
- Region: East
- Country: England
- Sovereign state: United Kingdom
- Post town: NORWICH
- Postcode district: NR9
- Dialling code: 01603
- Police: Norfolk
- Fire: Norfolk
- Ambulance: East of England

Attlebridge is a village and civil parish in the English county of Norfolk. It is about 8 miles (13 km) north-west of Norwich, where the A1067 road crosses the River Wensum.

The civil parish has an area of 5.27 square kilometres (2.03 mi^{2}) and in the 2001 census had a population of 122 in 50 households, increasing to a population of 223 in 96 households at the 2011 Census. For the purposes of local government, the parish falls within the district of Broadland.

The mediaeval parish church of St Andrew is a Grade II* listed building.

== History ==
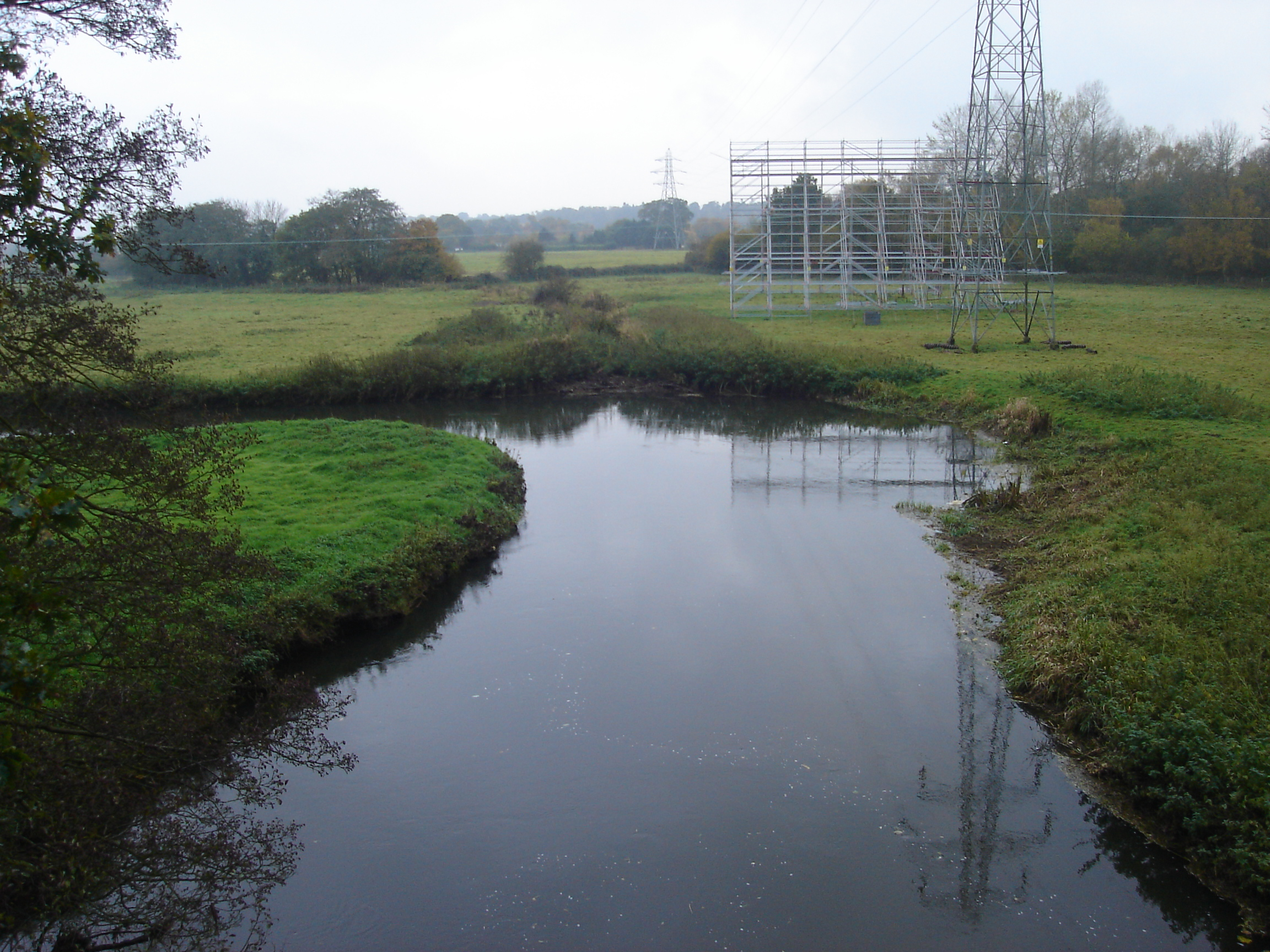
The River Wensum below the village at Marriott's Way

The village is named after Ætla and the nearby bridge he is credited with constructing. Between the 1880s and 1950s the settlement had its own Attlebridge railway station offering direct trains to Norwich and Kings Lynn. It was eventually closed as a cost-cutting measure by British Rail.

During World War II a nearby airfield, designated RAF Attlebridge, was used as an airfield for launching Allied aircraft missions against Axis targets in Europe.
