= Rackheath =

Village in Norfolk, England

Coordinates: 52.6753°N 1.3701°E

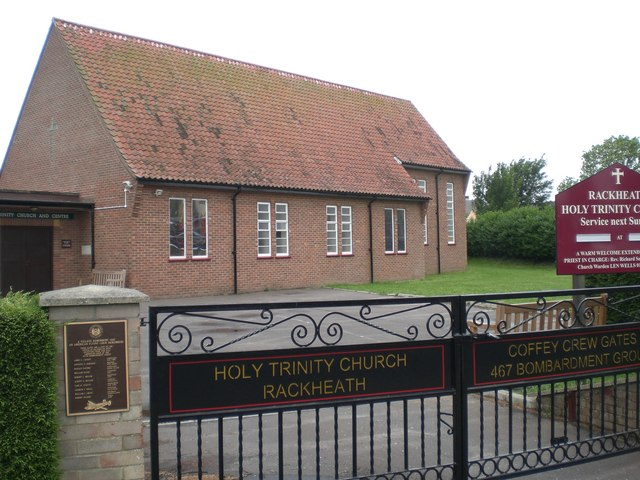
- Holy Trinity Church, Rackheath

- Location within Norfolk
- Area: 7.52 km^{2} (2.90 sq mi)
- Population: 1,972 (2011)
  - Density: 262/km^{2} (680/sq mi)
- OS grid reference: TG279139
- Civil parish: Rackheath
- District: Broadland
- Shire county: Norfolk
- Region: East
- Country: England
- Sovereign state: United Kingdom
- Post town: NORWICH
- Postcode district: NR13
- Dialling code: 01603
- Police: Norfolk
- Fire: Norfolk
- Ambulance: East of England
- UK Parliament: Broadland and Fakenham

Rackheath is a village and civil parish in the English county of Norfolk, and is roughly 6 miles (9.7 km) north-east of Norwich city centre. It covers an area of 7.52 km^{2} (2.90 sq mi) and had a population of 1,551 in 625 households at the 2001 census, increasing to a population of 1,972 in 762 households at the 2011 Census. For the purposes of local government, it falls within the district of Broadland. It is the site of a proposed new eco-town.

The villages name origin is uncertain 'Narrow landing place' or perhaps, 'hollow landing place' or 'narrow path landing place'.

The A1151 Norwich to Wroxham Road runs through the parish dividing it in two. There is a small settlement (originally known as Great Rackheath or Rackheath Magna) near the 14th century listed church of All Saints (redundant since the 1970s) to the north, and the now much larger settlement of New Rackheath (but originally known as Little Rackheath or Rackheath Parva) to the south. All Saints church has a 12th-century canonical sundial on the south wall. New Rackheath contains the modern (1959) Holy Trinity Church as well as the 1930s art deco style Sole and Heel public house, which is situated in the part of the village known locally as Slipper Bottom (or Slipper's Bottom). Rackheath's other pubs are the Racecourse Inn, originally the Washington Hotel, on Salhouse Road; and the Green Man, on the Wroxham Road, which dates from before 1826 and closed in November 2011.

Rackheath was the location of a Second World War USAAF base, the most easterly and therefore the nearest to Germany of all British wartime airfields. Near the village sign on Salhouse Road, next to the gate of Holy Trinity Church, is a memorial plaque to the 467th Bombardment Group, which consisted of four squadrons who flew B-24 Liberators from the base in support of the Allied advance across Europe. Part of the former airfield is now Rackheath Industrial Estate.

== Rackheath Eco Town ==
In 2008, controversial proposals were made for a new eco-town containing over 5100 homes to be built in Rackheath and Salhouse on farmland formerly the site of the Second World War RAF Rackheath airfield. The proposals have attracted much criticism, mainly because the eco-town is to be built on a greenfield site, within a mile of The Broads National Park. A local group calling themselves SNUB, or Stop Norwich UrBanisation, was set up to oppose these proposals.

These proposals include the provision of a new railway station on the Bittern Line. A halt for the village had been considered in the early days of the railway.
