= A1067 road =

Road in Norfolk, England

Coordinates: 52.731°N 1.07177°E

A1067

Route information
- Length: 25 mi (40 km)

Major junctions
- From: Fakenham
- A148 A140 A1024 A147
- To: Norwich

Location
- Country: United Kingdom
- Constituent country: England

Road network
- Roads in the United Kingdom; Motorways; A and B road zones

The A1067 is an English A road entirely in the county of Norfolk. It runs from Fakenham Northern By-Pass (A148) to Norwich inner ring road (A147).

== Future developments ==
=== Norwich Western Link ===
Norfolk County Council are developing a proposal for a link road between the A1067 at Attlebridge and A47 at Easton known as the Norwich Western Link.
