= Norwich City railway station =

Former railway station in Norfolk, England

Norwich City
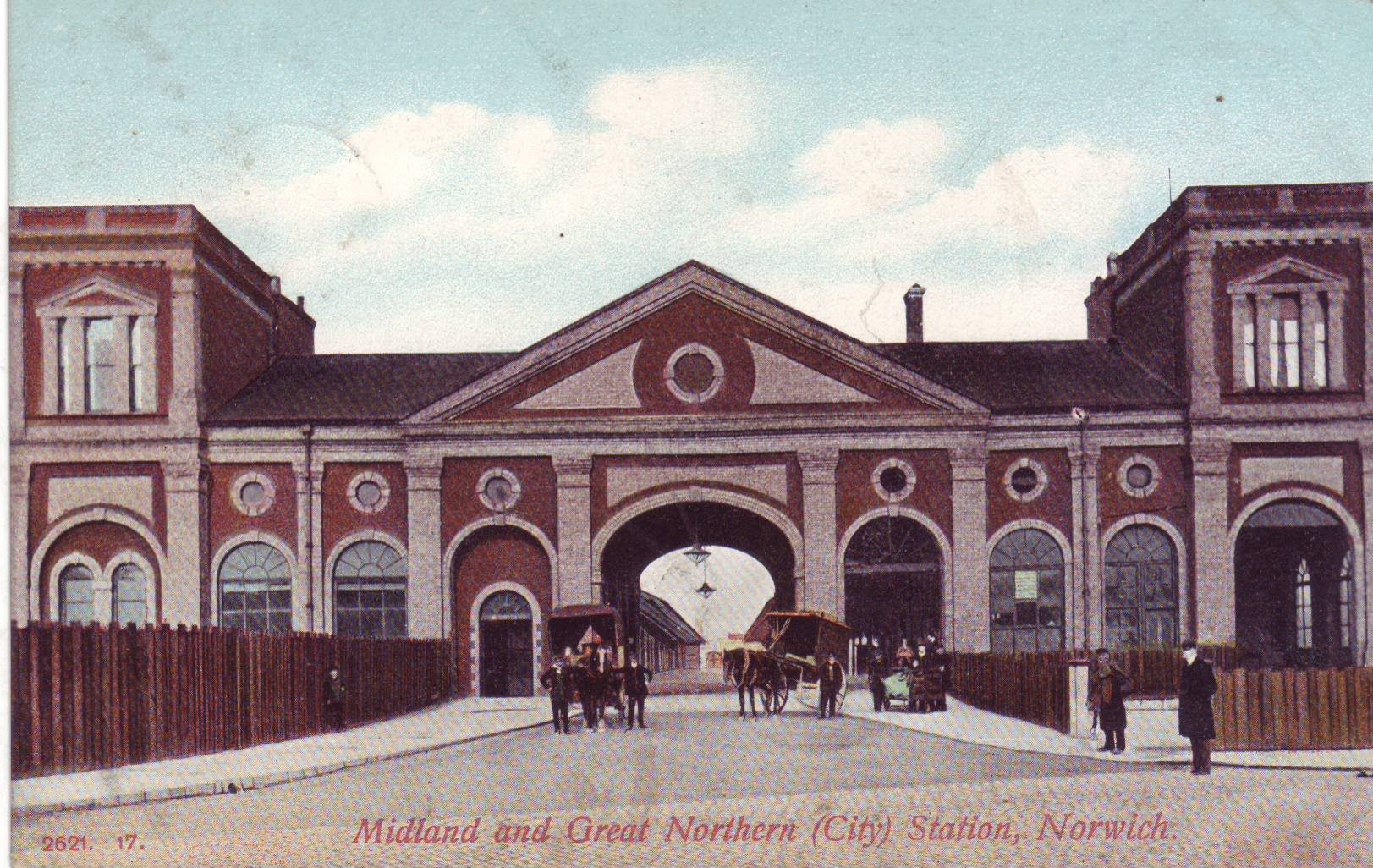
- Station in the early 1900s.

General information
- Location: Norwich, Norwich; England
- Coordinates: 52.63445°N 1.28768°E
- Platforms: 4

Other information
- Status: Disused

History
- Original company: Lynn and Fakenham Railway
- Pre-grouping: Midland and Great Northern Joint Railway
- Post-grouping: Midland and Great Northern Joint Railway; Eastern Region of British Railways

Key dates
- 2 December 1882: Opened
- 2 March 1959: Closed to passengers
- 24 February 1969: Closed to freight
Location

Norwich City railway station was located in Norwich, Norfolk, England and was closed in 1959.

== History ==
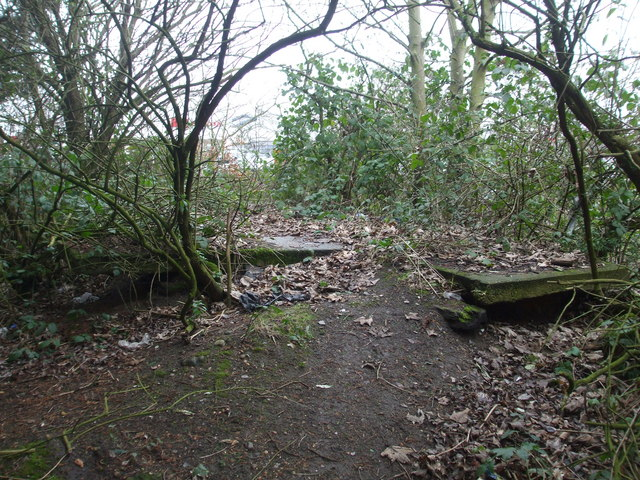
The remains of the bay platform in 2009.

The station was opened in 1882 by the Lynn and Fakenham Railway, and later became the southern terminus of the Midland and Great Northern Joint Railway (MG&N) line from Melton Constable. It became well-used, with services to Cromer and through-carriages to a range of destinations including Peterborough and Leicester.

The station was badly bombed in the Baedeker raids of 1942 when the main building was largely destroyed. Thereafter, the station operated from "temporary" buildings constructed on the site. Later in the war, in 1944, a B24 Liberator bomber of the USAF clipped the tower of St Philips Church and then was deliberately steered to crash into the station's sidings and coal yards to avoid the surrounding houses. The pilot and crew were all killed.

The station was closed to passengers on 2 March 1959 along with most of the Midland & Great Northern system, although the station remained in use for goods traffic until 1969.

== Location ==
The old Norwich City station stood where a roundabout is situated on the Inner link road A147, which links Barn Road with St Crispins Road close to Anglia Square. The present Norwich railway station is about 1 mile (1.6 km) away, to the southeast.

== Recent news and developments ==
The amateur group Friends of Norwich City Station (FONCS) has been set up to preserve what is left of the station and surrounding buildings. Current work is focused on the platform area. The Platform 1 wall has been discovered and the bay area has been cleared of undergrowth. The hope for the future is to uncover all the railway related parts of the area and turn it into a memorial garden. They also documented all those who served at the station. Interpretation boards will be erected, some including old photographs of the site. It is hoped that M&GN benches will accompany these.

== Former services ==
Preceding station	Disused railways	Following station
Terminus	Midland and Great Northern; Norwich Branch	Hellesdon

== See also ==
- Norwich Thorpe railway station
- Norwich Victoria railway station
- List of closed railway stations in Norfolk
