= Listed buildings in Broadland District =

Protected structures in Norfolk, England

There are around 1,000 listed buildings in the Broadland district, which are buildings of architectural or historic interest.

- Grade I buildings are of exceptional interest.
- Grade II* buildings are particularly important buildings of more than special interest.
- Grade II buildings are of special interest.

The lists follow Historic England's geographical organisation, with entries grouped by county, local authority, and parish (civil and non-civil). The following lists are arranged by parish.

| Parish | List of listed buildings | Grade I | Grade II* | Grade II | Total |
|---|---|---|---|---|---|
| Acle | Listed buildings in Acle | | | | |
| Alderford | Listed buildings in Alderford | | | | |
| Attlebridge | Listed buildings in Attlebridge | | | | |
| Aylsham | Listed buildings in Aylsham | | | | |
| Beeston St. Andrew | Listed buildings in Beeston St. Andrew | | | | |
| Beighton | Listed buildings in Beighton | | | | |
| Belaugh | Listed buildings in Belaugh | | | | |
| Blickling | Listed buildings in Blickling | | | | |
| Blofield | Listed buildings in Blofield | | | | |
| Booton | Listed buildings in Booton, Norfolk | | | | |
| Brampton | Listed buildings in Brampton, Norfolk | | | | |
| Brandiston | Listed buildings in Brandiston | | | | |
| Brundall | Listed buildings in Brundall | | | | |
| Burgh and Tuttington | Listed buildings in Burgh and Tuttington | | | | |
| Buxton with Lammas | Listed buildings in Buxton with Lammas | | | | |
| Cantley, Limpenhoe and Southwood | Listed buildings in Cantley, Norfolk, Limpenhoe and Southwood | | | | |
| Cawston | Listed buildings in Cawston, Norfolk | | | | |
| Coltishall | Listed buildings in Coltishall | | | | |
| Crostwick | Listed buildings in Crostwick | | | | |
| Drayton | Listed buildings in Drayton, Norfolk | | | | |
| Felthorpe | Listed buildings in Felthorpe | | | | |
| Foulsham | Listed buildings in Foulsham | | | | |
| Freethorpe | Listed buildings in Freethorpe | | | | |
| Frettenham | Listed buildings in Frettenham | | | | |
| Great and Little Plumstead | Listed buildings in Great and Little Plumstead | | | | |
| Great Witchingham | Listed buildings in Great Witchingham | | | | |
| Guestwick | Listed buildings in Guestwick | | | | |
| Hainford | Listed buildings in Hainford | | | | |
| Halvergate | Listed buildings in Halvergate | | | | |
| Haveringland | Listed buildings in Haveringland | | | | |
| Hellesdon | Listed buildings in Hellesdon | | | | |
| Hemblington | Listed buildings in Hemblington | | | | |
| Hevingham | Listed buildings in Hevingham | | | | |
| Heydon | Listed buildings in Heydon, Norfolk | | | | |
| Honingham | Listed buildings in Honingham | | | | |
| Horsford | Listed buildings in Horsford | | | | |
| Horsham St. Faith and Newton St. Faith | Listed buildings in Horsham St. Faith and Newton St. Faith | | | | |
| Horstead with Stanninghall | Listed buildings in Horstead with Stanninghall | | | | |
| Lingwood and Burlingham | Listed buildings in Lingwood and Burlingham | | | | |
| Little Witchingham | Listed buildings in Little Witchingham | | | | |
| Marsham | Listed buildings in Marsham, Norfolk | | | | |
| Morton on the Hill | Listed buildings in Morton on the Hill | | | | |
| Old Catton | Listed buildings in Old Catton | | | | |
| Oulton | Listed buildings in Oulton | | | | |
| Postwick with Witton | Listed buildings in Postwick with Witton | | | | |
| Rackheath | Listed buildings in Rackheath | | | | |
| Reedham | Listed buildings in Reedham, Norfolk | | | | |
| Reepham | Listed buildings in Reepham | | | | |
| Ringland | Listed buildings in Ringland, Norfolk | | | | |
| Salhouse | Listed buildings in Salhouse | | | | |
| Salle | Listed buildings in Salle, Norfolk | | | | |
| South Walsham | Listed buildings in South Walsham | | | | |
| Spixworth | Listed buildings in Spixworth | | | | |
| Sprowston | Listed buildings in Sprowston | | | | |
| Stratton Strawless | Listed buildings in Stratton Strawless | | | | |
| Strumpshaw | Listed buildings in Strumpshaw | | | | |
| Swannington | Listed buildings in Swannington, Norfolk | | | | |
| Taverham | Listed buildings in Taverham | | | | |
| Themelthorpe | Listed buildings in Themelthorpe | | | | |
| Thorpe St. Andrew | Listed buildings in Thorpe St. Andrew | | | | |
| Upton with Fishley | Listed buildings in Upton with Fishley | | | | |
| Weston Longville | Listed buildings in Weston Longville | | | | |
| Wood Dalling | Listed buildings in Wood Dalling | | | | |
| Woodbastwick | Listed buildings in Woodbastwick | | | | |
| Wroxham | Listed buildings in Wroxham | | | | |

== See also ==
- Grade I listed buildings in Norfolk
- Grade II* listed buildings in Norfolk

== Sources ==
- Wilson, Bill; Pevsner, Nikolaus (1997) [1962], Norfolk 1: Norwich and North-East, The Buildings of England, New Haven and London: Yale University Press, ISBN 978-0-300-09607-1
