= Salhouse Broad =

Lake in Norfolk, England

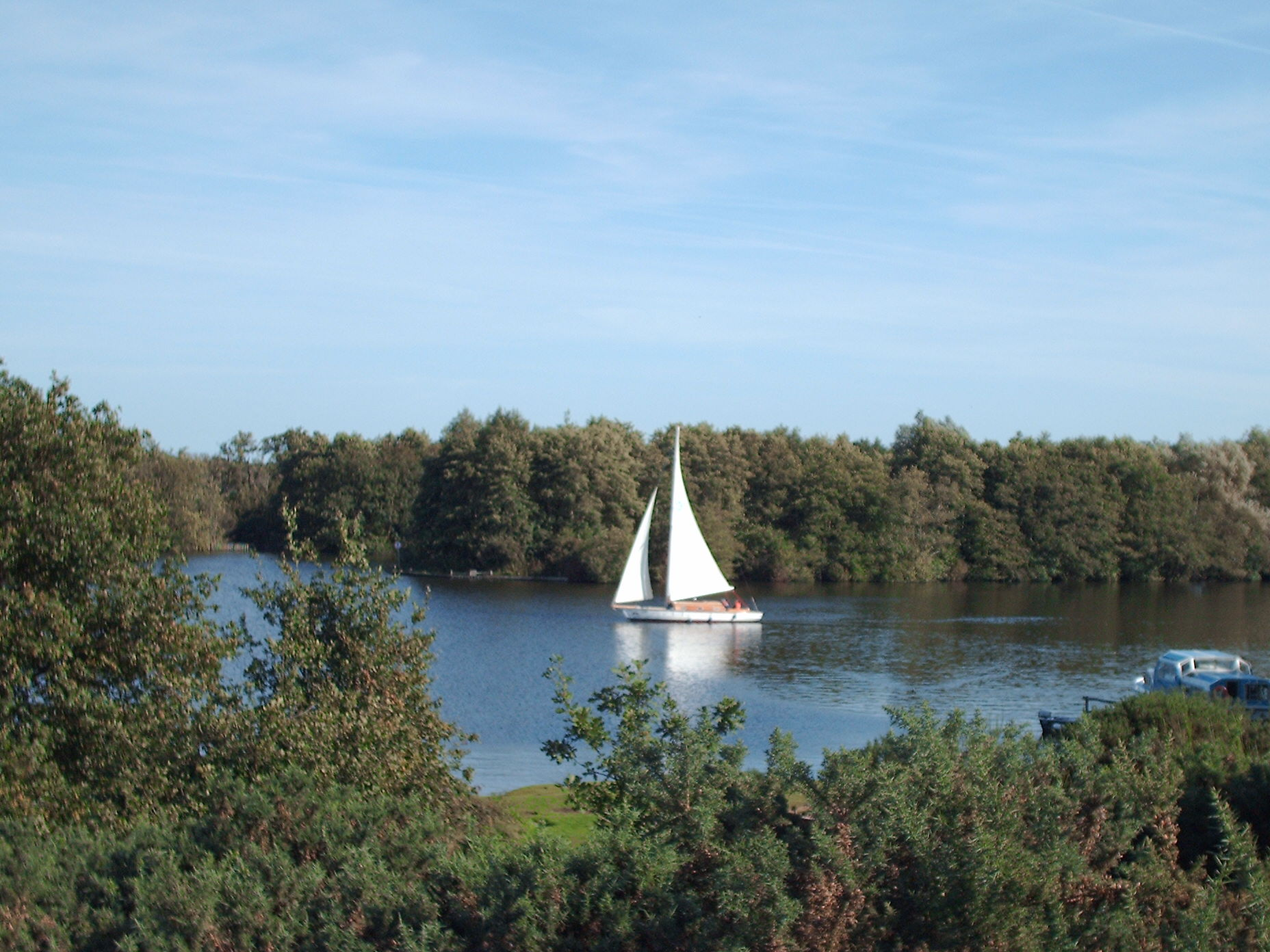

- Location within Norfolk
- Location: Norfolk, England
- Coordinates: 52°41′22″N 1°25′46″E
- Primary inflows: River Bure
- Primary outflows: River Bure
- Basin countries: United Kingdom

Salhouse Broad, one of the Norfolk Broads, is situated on the River Bure in Norfolk, England.

The broad is situated just off the river and attracts little through traffic. It lies south of Hoveton Great Broad and approximately half a mile north of the village of Salhouse. Salhouse Broad is accessible from the landward side and moorings are also permitted to fee-paying boat visitors. It is privately owned and managed in conjunction with the community of Salhouse. The broad covers an area of 32 acres (130,000 m^{2}) and is home to many forms of wildlife including the Norfolk hawker dragonfly and the swallowtail butterfly. Black swans have been recorded on this broad. Salhouse Broad is unusual in being the result of the flooding of tenth century sand and gravel diggings, not of peat diggings, like most of the broads. Short walking routes, play spaces and camping facilities are available.
