= Aylsham Town Hall =

Municipal building in Aylsham, Norfolk, England

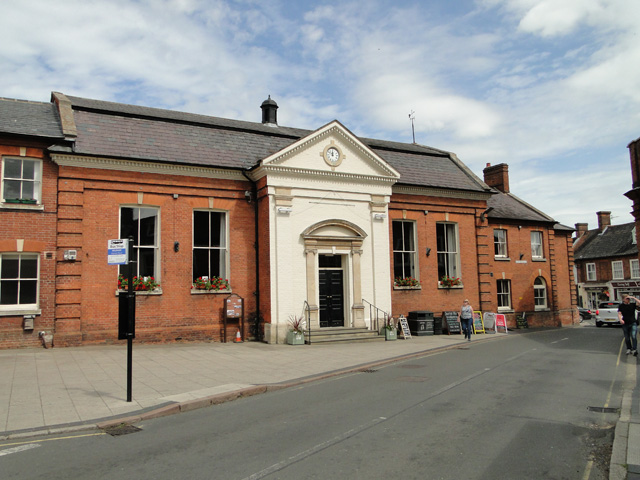
- Aylsham Town Hall

- Shown in Norfolk
- 52.7954°N 1.2515°E
- Location: Market Place, Aylsham

History
- Built: 1857

Site notes
- Architectural style: Neoclassical style

Listed Building – Grade II
- Official name: Town Hall, Market Place
- Designated: 1 June 1984
- Reference no.: 1306405

Aylsham Town Hall is a municipal building in the Market Place in Aylsham, Norfolk, England. The structure, which accommodates the offices and meeting place of Aylsham Town Council, is a grade II listed building.

== History ==
In the mid-19th century, a group of local businessmen decided to form a company to raise funds for the erection of a corn exchange. The site they selected was on the north side of the Market Place and the foundation stone for the building was laid by the 8th Marquess of Lothian on 6 October 1856. It was designed in the neoclassical style, built in red brick at a cost of £2,100 and was completed in 1857.

The design involved an asymmetrical main frontage with nine bays facing onto the Market Place; it involved two distinct sections: a main section of five bays and a right-hand section of four bays which was set back from the main section. The main section contained a central bay, which was slightly projected forward and featured a doorway, accessed by a short flight of steps, which was flanked by Ionic order pilasters supporting a segmental pediment; the central bay was surmounted by a modillioned pediment with a clock in the tympanum. The outer bays in the main section were fenestrated by sash windows with keystones. The right-hand section was also fenestrated by sash windows although the right-hand bay, which was still further set back, was blind. Internally, the principal room was the main assembly hall which contained a queen post roof.

The 6th Battalion of the Norfolk Rifle Volunteers, which was raised on 23 September 1859, used the building as its drill hall and petty session hearings were held there once a fortnight in the 19th century. The building was extended to the west to create additional office space in 1892. Following a collapse in corn prices, the company which had developed the building got into financial difficulties: a local solicitor, William Forster, acquired the building and the company was wound up in 1893.

The building was the venue for important public events and, in 1899, it hosted the declaration of the result for the 1899 North Norfolk parliamentary by-election which was won by the Liberal Party candidate, Sir William Gurdon. After Forster's death in 1906, the building was acquired by the local parish council and Sir Oswald Mosley held a gathering of the British Union of Fascists there in 1939.

Following local government re-organisation in 1974, the town hall became the home of Aylsham Town Council. A refurbishment of some of the facilities in the town hall was completed in March 2018. Items of interest in the town hall include a collection of material relating to the locally-born pioneer of anaesthesia, Joseph Clover.
