= Milestones Hospital =

- Showing site of Milestones Hospital

Geography
- Location: Salhouse, Norfolk, England, United Kingdom
- Coordinates: 52.685783°N 1.395486°E

Organisation
- Care system: Public NHS
- Type: Specialist

Services
- Beds: 10
- Speciality: Psychiatry

History
- Founded: 2007

Links
- Website: www.milestoneshospital.co.uk
- Lists: Hospitals in England

Milestones Hospital is a 10-bed mental hospital for women at Salhouse, Norfolk. Milestones is owned by the Atarrah Project Ltd.

== History ==
The Milestones Hospital, which was originally founded by mental health nurse Lisa Vescio, began taking patients early in 2007. It admits female patients who have been detained under the Mental Health Act.
