= Church of St Michael, Aylsham =

Church of St Michael
- Church of St Michael and All Angels, Aylsham
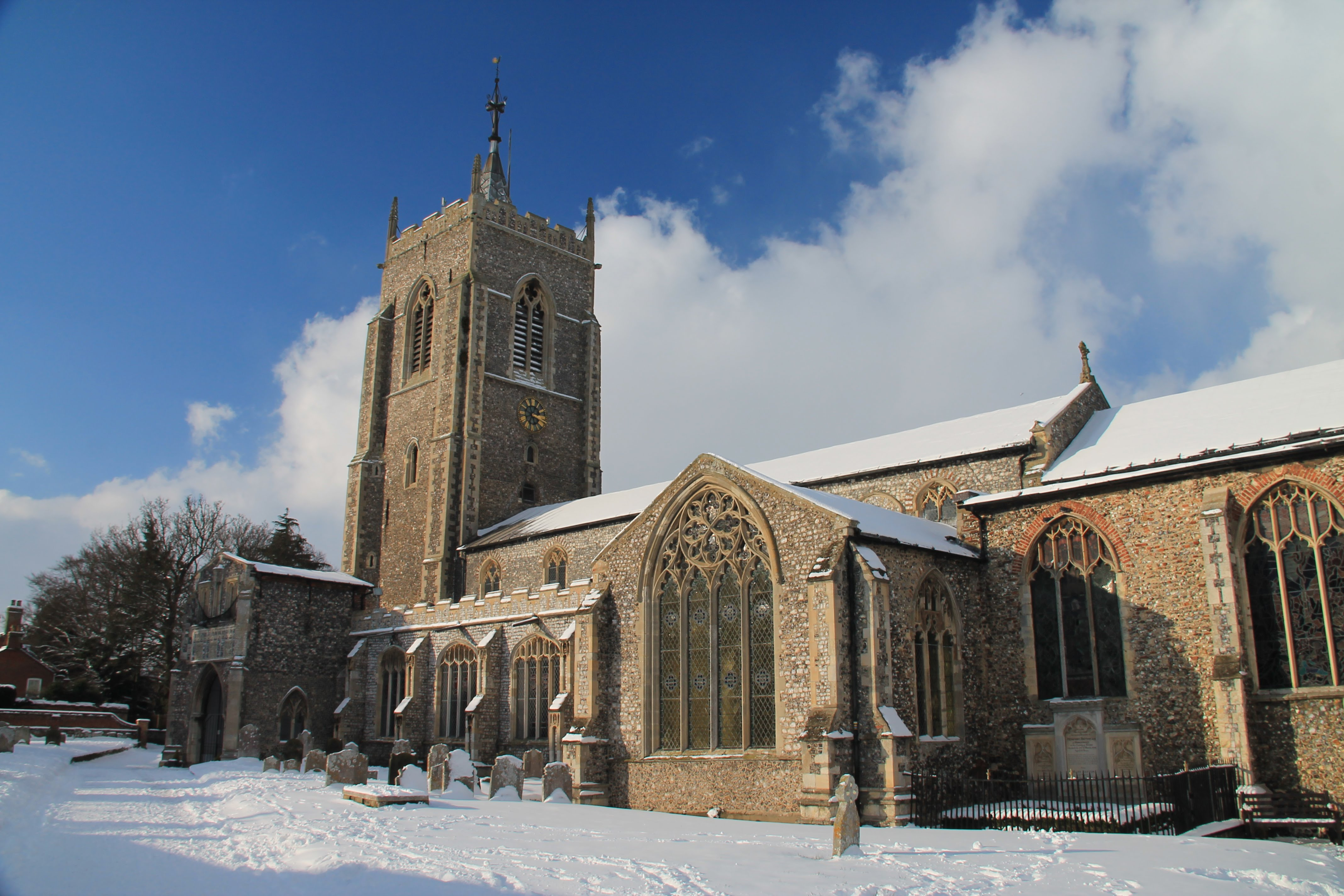

- Location in Norfolk
- 52°47′46″N 1°15′03″E
- Location: Aylsham, Norfolk
- Country: England
- Denomination: Church of England

History
- Founded: 14th century
- Dedication: Saint Michael

Architecture
- Heritage designation: Grade I
- Designated: 10 May 1961

Administration
- Diocese: Diocese of Norwich

Clergy
- Vicar: Revd Canon Julie Boyd

The Church of St Michael and All Angels, Aylsham, Norfolk, is a church of medieval origins that was built in the 14th century under the patronage of John of Gaunt, lord of the manor of Aylsham.

The church remains an active parish church and is a Grade I listed building.

== History ==
Historic England gives a construction date for the church of the 14th century, with further work in the fifteenth and a major Victorian restoration in 1852. Pevsner suggests that the interior contains the oldest built elements, dating the arcades to the late 13th century. The 'lavish two-storeyed porch' was constructed by Richard Howard, Sheriff of Norwich, and dates from 1488. The tower is of the 14th century, a rare example of its type surviving from the Middle Ages.

In the 19th century, the Rev. Edmund Yates undertook a "drastic(….)" restoration, particularly of the interior. The traditional box pews were replaced with seating for over 700 and the galleries were removed.

The landscape gardener Humphry Repton is buried in the churchyard and is commemorated with a memorial located outside of the chancel door. Pevsner notes that the construction date of the monument "must be considerably later than that of Repton's death". Repton, born in the neighbouring county of Suffolk in 1752, had purchased a small county estate at Sustead, near Aylsham in 1778, and many of his earliest commissions were from local Norfolk landowners. (Note: The bicentenary of Repton's death in 1818 was commemorated by a series of events, including a memorial lecture at St Michael's.) (Note: Commenting on his career, and on what he perceived as the decline of his profession towards the end of his life, Repton remarked; "as a landscape designer I have never been superseded by a more successful rival. My own profession, like myself, was becoming extinct".)

The tower holds ten bells, with the tenor bell weighing 17 long hundredweight, 1 quarter and 6 pounds, and is tuned to E flat. The tenor bell is the largest cast by Samuel Gilpin, in 1700, and it has a protection order. The bells are rung on Tuesday evenings for practice, and on Sunday mornings as well as to mark national and civic events. The tower captain is Michael Cocker.

The churchyard also contains a "very rare" mortsafe, an iron grille placed over a grave to prevent body snatching.

St Michael's remains an active parish church in the Aylsham and District ministry, and regular services are held. Reorganisation of the interior of the church in the later 20th century has enabled the holding of concerts, exhibitions and a produce market. The church also hosts a local choir. The Aylsham Heritage Centre, a museum of local history, is located in the former church hall in the grounds.

== Architecture and description ==
The writer A. C. Benson, author of the words to "Land of Hope and Glory", described St Michael's during a visit in 1902; "(it) is long and low, a large grey flint building, low-pitched roof-transepts and aisles, with a very fine tower". The construction is of flint, sometimes knapped, with rubble infilling.

The church is a Grade I listed building.

== Sources ==
- Pevsner, Nikolaus; Wilson, Bill (2002). Norfolk 1: Norwich and North-East. The Buildings of England. New Haven, US, & London, UK: Yale University Press. ISBN 9780300096071. OCLC 1017826823.
- Elders, Joseph (2004). Revealing the Past, Informing the Future: A Guide to Archaeology for Parishes. Church House Publishing. ISBN 9780715176030.
