= Aylsham High School =

Location
- Sir Williams Lane, Aylsham; Norwich, Norfolk, NR11 6AN; England; 52.797832°N 1.257806°E

Information
- Type: Foundation school
- Local authority: Norfolk
- Trust: Aylsham Cluster Trust
- Department for Education URN: 121164 Tables
- Ofsted: Reports
- Chair of governors: Jenny Youngs
- Head Teacher: Duncan Spalding
- Gender: Coeducational
- Age: 11 to 16
- Enrolment: 1,023 pupils – as of November 2011
- Colours: Uniform: Navy Blue, White, and Royal Blue PE: Royal Blue and White
- Website: http://www.aylshamhigh.co.uk

Aylsham High School is a secondary school in the market town of Aylsham north of Norwich, in the English county of Norfolk. It has around 1,100 pupils ranging in age from 11 to 16. Duncan Spalding is the head teacher. The school catchment area includes the town of Aylsham and surrounding villages, including Aldborough, Buxton, Colby, Erpingham and Marsham.

In May 2011 the school was judged to be overall "outstanding" by Ofsted, the English school inspections service. As of its most recent Ofsted report, the school has received a rating of "good".

== History ==
Aylsham is the last secondary school in Norfolk to remain with the council as a foundation school.

== Architecture ==
The school consists of multiple buildings and facilities including: "an all-weather, floodlit, FA and FIFA-approved 3G pitch, tennis and netball court"

== Mentoring ==
Friendly Faces is a peer support group led by Year 10 and 11 students, providing assistance to younger pupils through drop-in sessions and playground patrols while wearing identifiable orange high-visibility jackets. The group also engages in outreach activities, including visits to local primary schools during the summer term to help Year 6 students transition to high school. Additionally, they organize training and selection sessions for new members and actively promote anti-bullying initiatives within the school. In 2012, Friendly Faces hosted an Anti-Bullying Conference for the Norfolk Region in collaboration with the Diana Award Anti-Bullying Ambassadors Programme, featuring Alex Holmes. In 2013, they were invited to Facebook's headquarters in London to showcase best practices in school-based anti-bullying efforts.

The project, first introduced in 2001, has 20 senior Friendly Faces in year 11 who support a team of 40 year 10 friendly faces at the school. Originally the programme aimed to support pupils who felt they were victims of bullying. The project was later broadened to support any and all issues pupils may face.

=== Awards won ===
- 2015 – Diana Award Anti-Bullying Champions
- 2014 – Bernard Matthews Youth Awards Finalists
- 2014 – Diana Award Anti-Bullying Champions
- 2013 – Diana Award Anti-Bullying Champions
- 2013 – Bernard Matthews Youth Awards finalists
- 2012 – Diana Award Anti-Bullying Champions
- 2011 – Diana Award Anti-Bullying Champions
- 2010 – Diana Award Anti-Bullying Champions
- 2009 – Diana Award
- 2008 – Diana Award
- 2007 – Diana Award
- 2007 – Philip Lawrence Award
- 2006 – Diana Award
