= Hoveton Great Broad =

- Location within Norfolk
- Location: The Broads, Norfolk
- Coordinates: 52°41′41″N 1°25′43″E
- Basin countries: United Kingdom

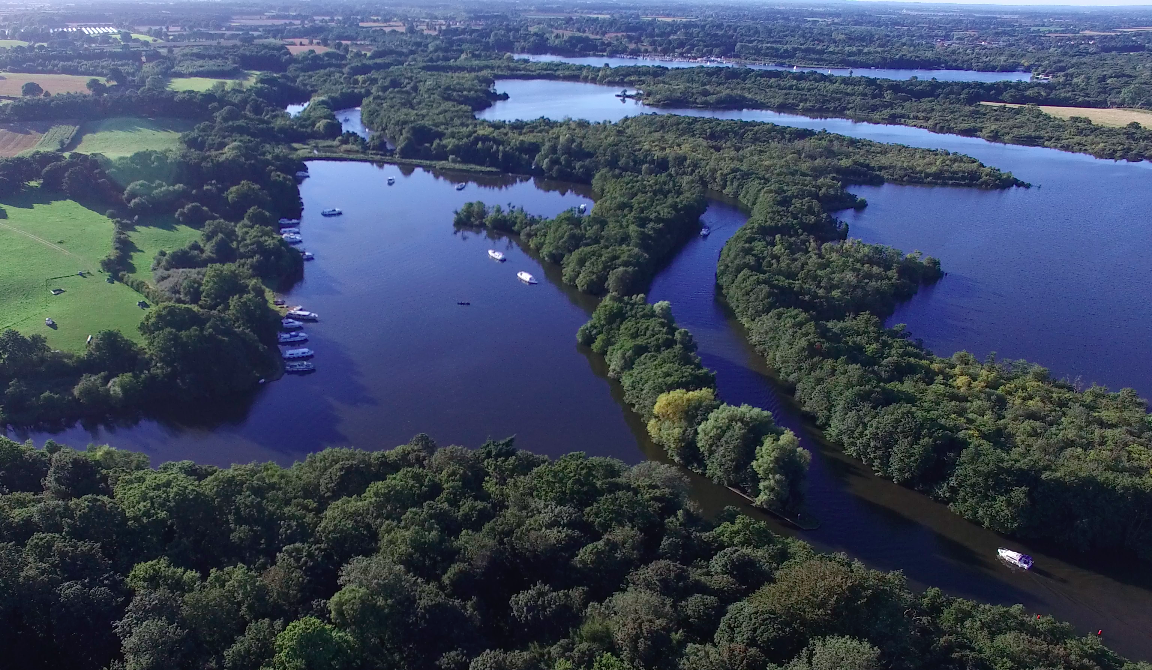
Hoveton Great Broad, on the right. Salhouse Broad (left) and Wroxham Broad (top) give scale

Hoveton Great Broad lies within The Broads in Norfolk, England, between Wroxham Broad and Salhouse Broad.

The broad is connected to the River Bure, but not open to boat traffic. Hoveton Great Broad is part of an ancient navigation that has been deliberately allowed to become closed off to any public access since well before the last War. Recent changes in the official Ordnance Survey tide line mean that it is now tidal water and therefore closed illegally. A nature trail was laid out in 1968 - the first in the region. It is accessible only by boat. Mooring is allowed on the north bank of the Bure, opposite Salhouse Broad.

Natural England has established a nature trail. From the boardwalk, one can see the broad with its adjoining fens and alder carr.

Hoveton Great Broad has a surface area of 0.37 square kilometres (0.14 sq mi) and an average depth of 1-metre (3 ft 3 in). It has a catchment area of 93 hectares (230 acres) and is about 2 metres (6 ft 7 in) above sea level.
