= Listed buildings in Foulsham =

Non-Civil Parish in Norfolk, England

Foulsham is a village and civil parish in the Broadland district of Norfolk, England. It contains 31 listed buildings that are recorded in the National Heritage List for England. Of these one is grade I, two are grade II* and 28 are grade II.

This list is based on the information retrieved online from Historic England.

== Key ==
Grade	Criteria
I	Buildings that are of exceptional interest
II*	Particularly important buildings of more than special interest
II	Buildings that are of special interest

== Listing ==
Name	Grade	Location	Type	Completed (Note: The date given is the date used by Historic England as significant for the initial building or that of an important part in the structure's description.)	Date designated	Grid ref. (Note: The grid reference is based on the British national grid reference system, sometimes known as OSGB36, used by the Ordnance Survey.) Geo-coordinates	Notes	Entry number (Note: The "List Entry Number" is a unique number assigned to each listed building and scheduled monument by Historic England.)	Image	Wikidata
Parish Rooms, Engine House and Barn to Old Rectory	II	Engine House And Barn To Old Rectory, Hindolveston Road			3 May 1983	TG0323825083; 52°47′06″N 1°00′44″E		1372924	Upload Photo	Q26653970
Bank House Market Stores	II	High Street			3 May 1983	TG0320324935; 52°47′01″N 1°00′42″E		1372922	Upload Photo	Q26653968
Dial House	II	High Street			12 November 1980	TG0315424895; 52°47′00″N 1°00′39″E		1050979	Upload Photo	Q26302908
Foulsham War Memorial	II	High Street, NR20 5RU	war memorial		7 March 2017	TG0322124971; 52°47′03″N 1°00′43″E		1443368	Foulsham War Memorial More images	Q66478553
Garden Wall of Ivy Farm House	II	High Street			3 May 1983	TG0316624890; 52°47′00″N 1°00′40″E		1050981	Upload Photo	Q26302910
Glenmore House Glenmore Cottage	II	High Street			3 May 1983	TG0317124921; 52°47′01″N 1°00′40″E		1372920	Upload Photo	Q26653966
Market House	II	High Street			3 May 1983	TG0319624958; 52°47′02″N 1°00′42″E		1050980	Upload Photo	Q26302909
Mill House	II	High Street			3 May 1983	TG0317624822; 52°46′58″N 1°00′40″E		1372921	Upload Photo	Q26653967
Rose Villa	II	High Street			3 May 1983	TG0319424912; 52°47′01″N 1°00′42″E		1050982	Upload Photo	Q26302911
The Old Kings Arms	II	High Street			3 May 1983	TG0315124882; 52°47′00″N 1°00′39″E		1050978	Upload Photo	Q26302906
Church Farm House	II	Hindolveston Road			19 January 1952	TG0323425132; 52°47′08″N 1°00′44″E		1050986	Upload Photo	Q26302913
Church House	II	Hindolveston Road			3 May 1983	TG0324225036; 52°47′05″N 1°00′44″E		1169801	Upload Photo	Q26462980
Church of Holy Innocents	I	Hindolveston Road	church building		10 May 1961	TG0328225064; 52°47′05″N 1°00′47″E		1050984	Church of Holy Innocents More images	Q17535629
Churchyard Wall to the South of Church of the Holy Innocents	II	Hindolveston Road			3 May 1983	TG0328725039; 52°47′05″N 1°00′47″E		1169854	Upload Photo	Q26463029
Churchyard Wall to the West of Church of the Holy Innocents	II	Hindolveston Road			3 May 1983	TG0322725049; 52°47′05″N 1°00′44″E		1169841	Upload Photo	Q26463017
London House and Church View	II	Hindolveston Road			19 January 1952	TG0321625042; 52°47′05″N 1°00′43″E		1372923	Upload Photo	Q26653969
Table Tomb to the North-east of the West Door of the Church of the Holy Innocents	II*	Hindolveston Road	tomb		3 May 1983	TG0325025068; 52°47′06″N 1°00′45″E		1050985	Table Tomb to the North-east of the West Door of the Church of the Holy Innocents More images	Q17553982
The Old Rectory	II	Hindolveston Road			3 May 1983	TG0329225109; 52°47′07″N 1°00′47″E		1306312	Upload Photo	Q26593105
Virginia House	II	Hindolveston Road			10 May 1961	TG0321625027; 52°47′04″N 1°00′43″E		1050983	Upload Photo	Q26302912
Foulsham House	II	Market Hill			19 January 1952	TG0320324989; 52°47′03″N 1°00′42″E		1169895	Upload Photo	Q26463079
Hill House	II	Market Hill			3 May 1983	TG0325324960; 52°47′02″N 1°00′45″E		1372925	Upload Photo	Q26653971
Ivy House	II	Market Hill			3 May 1983	TG0325424987; 52°47′03″N 1°00′45″E		1050987	Upload Photo	Q26302914
Manor Farm House	II	Reepham Road			3 May 1983	TG0461924589; 52°46′48″N 1°01′57″E		1169909	Upload Photo	Q26463094
Old Hall Farm Boundary Wall	II	Reepham Road			3 May 1983	TG0349924870; 52°46′59″N 1°00′58″E		1306291	Upload Photo	Q26593085
Old Hall Farm House	II*	Reepham Road			19 January 1952	TG0345724907; 52°47′00″N 1°00′56″E		1372926	Upload Photo	Q17554310
Baptist Church	II	Station Road			3 May 1983	TG0311824550; 52°46′49″N 1°00′37″E		1050962	Upload Photo	Q26302893
Bethany Cottage Falgate Cottage	II	Station Road			3 May 1983	TG0304524499; 52°46′48″N 1°00′33″E		1170014	Upload Photo	Q26463264
Bracken Brae	II	Station Road			3 May 1983	TG0300024456; 52°46′46″N 1°00′30″E		1050989	Upload Photo	Q26302917
Bramblings Jasmine Cottage	II	Station Road			3 May 1983	TG0312124677; 52°46′53″N 1°00′37″E		1050961	Upload Photo	Q26302892
Station Farmhouse	II	Station Road			3 May 1983	TG0298524451; 52°46′46″N 1°00′29″E		1169942	Upload Photo	Q26463146
Westfield House	II	Station Road			3 May 1983	TG0279623803; 52°46′25″N 1°00′18″E		1050988	Upload Photo	Q26302915

== See also ==
- Grade I listed buildings in Norfolk
- Grade II* listed buildings in Norfolk

== Sources ==
- Wilson, Bill; Pevsner, Nikolaus (1999) [1962], Norfolk 2: North-West and South, The Buildings of England, New Haven and London: Yale University Press, ISBN 978-0-300-09657-6
