= Listed buildings in Thorpe St. Andrew =

Non-Civil Parish in Norfolk, England

Thorpe St. Andrew is a village and civil parish in the Broadland district of Norfolk, England. It contains 32 listed buildings that are recorded in the National Heritage List for England. Of these four are grade II* and 28 are grade II.

This list is based on the information retrieved online from Historic England.

== Key ==
Grade	Criteria
I	Buildings that are of exceptional interest
II*	Particularly important buildings of more than special interest
II	Buildings that are of special interest

== Listing ==
Name	Grade	Location	Type	Completed (Note: The date given is the date used by Historic England as significant for the initial building or that of an important part in the structure's description.)	Date designated	Grid ref. (Note: The grid reference is based on the British national grid reference system, sometimes known as OSGB36, used by the Ordnance Survey.) Geo-coordinates	Notes	Entry number (Note: The "List Entry Number" is a unique number assigned to each listed building and scheduled monument by Historic England.)	Image	Wikidata
Boatyard Foreman's Cottage	II	Griffin Lane			6 December 1991	TG2763908195; 52°37′26″N 1°21′43″E		1263402	Upload Photo	Q26554193
K6 Telephone Kiosk	II	River Green			24 February 1989	TG2624708391; 52°37′34″N 1°20′29″E		1250129	Upload Photo	Q26542199
Former St Andrew's Hospital	II	Saint Andrews Park, NR7 0GT	hospital building		17 December 1973	TG2795308628; 52°37′39″N 1°22′00″E		1372707	Former St Andrew's Hospital More images	Q26653793
Road Bridge at the Former Saint Andrews Hospital Site	II	Saint Andrews Park			14 November 1997	TG2806608710; 52°37′42″N 1°22′07″E		1031519	Road Bridge at the Former Saint Andrews Hospital Site More images	Q26282898
The Former Saint Andrews Hospital Chapel	II	Saint Andrews Park, NR7 0GG			14 November 1997	TG2793508565; 52°37′37″N 1°21′59″E		1031520	The Former Saint Andrews Hospital Chapel More images	Q26282899
Rushcutters	II	46 Yarmouth Road, NR7 0HE			19 March 1985	TG2633108353; 52°37′33″N 1°20′34″E		1051467	Upload Photo	Q26303332
Old Thorpe House	II	47 Yarmouth Road, NR7 0EN, Dale's Loke			20 February 1952	TG2591408454; 52°37′36″N 1°20′12″E		1303872	Upload Photo	Q26590905
10, Yarmouth Road	II	10, Yarmouth Road			22 August 1973	TG2559308434; 52°37′36″N 1°19′55″E		1154461	Upload Photo	Q26447571
The Manor House	II	12, Yarmouth Road			20 February 1952	TG2564008428; 52°37′36″N 1°19′57″E		1372686	Upload Photo	Q26653776
Ivy Cottage	II	13, Yarmouth Road			17 December 1973	TG2551708464; 52°37′37″N 1°19′51″E		1051502	Upload Photo	Q26303363
Manor Cottage	II	14, Yarmouth Road			22 August 1973	TG2561608437; 52°37′36″N 1°19′56″E		1154487	Upload Photo	Q26447607
Walpole House	II*	16, Yarmouth Road			20 February 1952	TG2565008431; 52°37′36″N 1°19′58″E		1051508	Upload Photo	Q17554025
18-20, Yarmouth Road	II	18-20, Yarmouth Road			21 May 1973	TG2566908426; 52°37′36″N 1°19′59″E		1154527	Upload Photo	Q26447667
Kings Head Inn Including Outbuildings to East	II	36, Yarmouth Road			17 December 1973	TG2584808415; 52°37′35″N 1°20′08″E		1154535	Upload Photo	Q26447677
Monks Barn	II	48, Yarmouth Road			17 December 1973	TG2636008377; 52°37′33″N 1°20′35″E		1154565	Upload Photo	Q26447716
51, Yarmouth Road	II	51, Yarmouth Road, NR7 0EW			17 December 1973	TG2598208422; 52°37′35″N 1°20′15″E		1154364	Upload Photo	Q26447447
Buck Inn	II	55, Yarmouth Road			17 December 1973	TG2608808422; 52°37′35″N 1°20′21″E		1051504	Buck Inn More images	Q26303364
Homestead	II	63, Yarmouth Road			17 December 1973	TG2613108413; 52°37′35″N 1°20′23″E		1303828	Upload Photo	Q26590864
The Dell	II	87, Yarmouth Road			17 December 1973	TG2634908407; 52°37′34″N 1°20′35″E		1051505	Upload Photo	Q26303365
The Old Rectory	II	103, Yarmouth Road			19 March 1985	TG2649808462; 52°37′36″N 1°20′43″E		1154429	Upload Photo	Q26447533
The White House	II	105, Yarmouth Road			25 September 1962	TG2656108442; 52°37′35″N 1°20′46″E		1051506	Upload Photo	Q26303366
107-113, Yarmouth Road	II	107-113, Yarmouth Road			25 September 1962	TG2660108472; 52°37′36″N 1°20′48″E		1372685	Upload Photo	Q26653775
Boundary Wall to Road Extending from Number 2 to Number 10	II	Yarmouth Road			22 August 1973	TG2547908447; 52°37′37″N 1°19′49″E		1051507	Upload Photo	Q26303367
Broadland District Council Offices Thorpe Lodge	II	Yarmouth Road			17 September 1973	TG2530608490; 52°37′39″N 1°19′39″E		1051501	Upload Photo	Q26303362
Church of St Andrew	II	Yarmouth Road	church building		17 December 1973	TG2607308444; 52°37′36″N 1°20′20″E		1303850	Church of St Andrew More images	Q26590884
Garden House 40m South of Walpole House	II*	Yarmouth Road			20 February 1952	TG2566008388; 52°37′35″N 1°19′58″E		1372706	Upload Photo	Q17554278
Gazebo South East of Thorpe Lodge on Yarmouth Road	II	Yarmouth Road			17 December 1973	TG2535508443; 52°37′37″N 1°19′42″E		1154356	Upload Photo	Q26447437
Ruin of Church of St Andrew	II*	Yarmouth Road	church ruin		25 September 1962	TG2606308411; 52°37′35″N 1°20′19″E		1051503	Ruin of Church of St Andrew More images	Q17554024
Thorpe Hall	II*	Yarmouth Road			20 February 1952	TG2554008396; 52°37′35″N 1°19′52″E		1154440	Upload Photo	Q17554101
Thorpe St Andrew War Memorial	II	Yarmouth Road, NR7 0HE	war memorial		18 June 2018	TG2615808390; 52°37′34″N 1°20′24″E		1456193	Thorpe St Andrew War Memorial More images	Q66479646
Town House Hotel	II	Yarmouth Road			22 August 1973	TG2569308419; 52°37′36″N 1°20′00″E		1051466	Upload Photo	Q26303331

== See also ==
- Grade I listed buildings in Norfolk
- Grade II* listed buildings in Norfolk

== Sources ==
- Wilson, Bill; Pevsner, Nikolaus (1999) [1962], Norfolk 2: North-West and South, The Buildings of England, New Haven and London: Yale University Press, ISBN 978-0-300-09657-6
