= Listed buildings in Reepham =

Non-Civil Parish in Norfolk, England

Reepham is a town and civil parish in the Broadland district of Norfolk, England. It contains 71 listed buildings that are recorded in the National Heritage List for England. Of these one is grade I, two are grade II* and 84 are grade II.

This list is based on the information retrieved online from Historic England.

== Key ==
Grade	Criteria
I	Buildings that are of exceptional interest
II*	Particularly important buildings of more than special interest
II	Buildings that are of special interest

== Listing ==
Name	Grade	Location	Type	Completed (Note: The date given is the date used by Historic England as significant for the initial building or that of an important part in the structure's description.)	Date designated	Grid ref. (Note: The grid reference is based on the British national grid reference system, sometimes known as OSGB36, used by the Ordnance Survey.) Geo-coordinates	Notes	Entry number (Note: The "List Entry Number" is a unique number assigned to each listed building and scheduled monument by Historic England.)	Image	Wikidata
Moor House Including Conservatory Adjoining South West	II				18 April 1989	TG1056623089; 52°45′52″N 1°07′10″E		1249264	Upload Photo	Q26541415
Nelson House	II	Back Street			22 July 1983	TG0998422805; 52°45′43″N 1°06′39″E		1076870	Upload Photo	Q26342678
Oak Leaf House and Acorn Cottage and Adjoining Cottage to East	II	Back Street			22 July 1983	TG1002722785; 52°45′43″N 1°06′41″E		1169468	Upload Photo	Q26462659
The Cardinals Hat	II	Back Street			22 July 1983	TG0997722817; 52°45′44″N 1°06′38″E		1076869	Upload Photo	Q26342674
The Greyhound Brick Arch	II	Back Street			22 July 1983	TG1006522787; 52°45′43″N 1°06′43″E		1169486	Upload Photo	Q26462678
The Oaks	II	Back Street			22 July 1983	TG1003222792; 52°45′43″N 1°06′41″E		1169477	Upload Photo	Q26462669
The Old Bakehouse	II	Back Street			22 July 1983	TG1004622769; 52°45′42″N 1°06′42″E		1076871	Upload Photo	Q26342681
The Old Shop	II	Back Street			22 July 1983	TG1005422765; 52°45′42″N 1°06′42″E		1342804	Upload Photo	Q26626739
Church of St Michael and All Angels	II*	Church Hill	church building		10 May 1961	TG1010822856; 52°45′45″N 1°06′45″E		1306488	Church of St Michael and All Angels More images	Q17554230
Church of the Nativity of St Mary with Brick Retaining Wall to the North	I	Church Hill	church building		10 May 1961	TG1013822856; 52°45′45″N 1°06′47″E		1076872	Church of the Nativity of St Mary with Brick Retaining Wall to the North More images	Q17535719
Fragment. Church of All Saints. 14 Metres South West of St Michaels Church	II	Church Hill	wall		10 May 1961	TG1008422835; 52°45′44″N 1°06′44″E		1342805	Fragment. Church of All Saints. 14 Metres South West of St Michaels Church More images	Q26626740
Magpie House	II	Church Hill			7 July 1972	TG1010022888; 52°45′46″N 1°06′45″E		1076873	Upload Photo	Q26342685
The Thatched Cottage	II	Church Hill			22 July 1983	TG1008922887; 52°45′46″N 1°06′44″E		1169587	Upload Photo	Q26462774
Boundary Wall. the Old Rectory	II	Church Street			22 July 1983	TG1016322853; 52°45′45″N 1°06′48″E		1306444	Upload Photo	Q26593225
Church Wall to South of St Marys Church	II	Church Street			22 July 1983	TG1012422831; 52°45′44″N 1°06′46″E		1342807	Upload Photo	Q26626742
Rookery Farm Barn	II	Church Street			22 July 1983	TG1006722720; 52°45′40″N 1°06′43″E		1306433	Upload Photo	Q26593215
Rookery Farm House and Cart Shed	II	Church Street			22 July 1983	TG1010922790; 52°45′43″N 1°06′45″E		1076874	Upload Photo	Q26342688
The Old Rectory	II	Church Street			22 July 1983	TG1018722856; 52°45′45″N 1°06′50″E		1342808	Upload Photo	Q26626743
Wavey Line Food Fare	II	Church Street			7 July 1972	TG1013822880; 52°45′45″N 1°06′47″E		1169616	Upload Photo	Q26462799
York House	II	Church Street			22 July 1983	TG1017422812; 52°45′43″N 1°06′49″E		1076875	Upload Photo	Q26342692
Eynesford House	II	Dereham Road			22 July 1983	TG0982522905; 52°45′47″N 1°06′30″E		1342809	Upload Photo	Q26626744
Pettywell Farm Barn 50 Metres East of Farm House	II	Dereham Road			22 July 1983	TG0853022967; 52°45′51″N 1°05′22″E		1076876	Upload Photo	Q26342696
Pettywell Farm Barn. 90 Metres North-east of Farm House	II	Dereham Road			22 July 1983	TG0853722988; 52°45′51″N 1°05′22″E		1076877	Upload Photo	Q26342700
Pettywell Farm House	II	Dereham Road			22 July 1983	TG0848022966; 52°45′51″N 1°05′19″E		1169671	Upload Photo	Q26462850
Pettywell Farm. Outbuildings 20 Metres East of Farm House	II	Dereham Road			22 July 1983	TG0850822964; 52°45′50″N 1°05′20″E		1169679	Upload Photo	Q26462858
The Laurels	II	Dereham Road			22 July 1983	TG0987822885; 52°45′46″N 1°06′33″E		1076878	Upload Photo	Q26342704
Vale House	II	Dereham Road			22 July 1983	TG0927222809; 52°45′44″N 1°06′01″E		1169689	Upload Photo	Q26462868
The Old Brewery House, Gates and Railings	II	Gates And Railings, Market Place	pub		19 January 1952	TG1000722904; 52°45′46″N 1°06′40″E		1076840	The Old Brewery House, Gates and Railings More images	Q26342574
Post Office, House of Reverend Easton. Oakdene and Church Hill House	II	House Of Reverend Easton. Oakdene And Church Hill House, Church Hill			22 July 1983	TG1007222884; 52°45′46″N 1°06′43″E		1342806	Upload Photo	Q26626741
Manor Farm Barn	II	Kerdiston			22 July 1983	TG0895024468; 52°46′38″N 1°05′47″E		1342827	Upload Photo	Q26626761
Manor Farm House	II	Kerdiston			22 July 1983	TG0889724461; 52°46′38″N 1°05′45″E		1306369	Upload Photo	Q26684256
Oaks Farm Barns	II	Kerdiston			22 July 1983	TG0694622772; 52°45′46″N 1°03′57″E		1342810	Upload Photo	Q26626745
Oaks Farm House	II	Kerdiston			22 July 1983	TG0699522750; 52°45′46″N 1°03′59″E		1306397	Upload Photo	Q26593182
Old Hall	II*	Kerdiston	house		22 July 1983	TG0874824144; 52°46′28″N 1°05′36″E		1169735	Old Hall More images	Q17554108
Old Workhouse Cottages	II	Kerdiston			22 July 1983	TG0771024561; 52°46′43″N 1°04′41″E		1076879	Upload Photo	Q26342706
7, Market Place	II	7, Market Place			22 July 1983	TG0998422835; 52°45′44″N 1°06′39″E		1076844	Upload Photo	Q26342588
Attfields Butchers Shop	II	Market Place			22 July 1983	TG0998422886; 52°45′46″N 1°06′39″E		1342791	Upload Photo	Q26626728
Bank House	II	Market Place, NR10 4JJ			22 July 1983	TG0997922874; 52°45′45″N 1°06′39″E		1076837	Upload Photo	Q26342563
Breese House Hewkes House the Drapers	II	Market Place			22 July 1983	TG1003622864; 52°45′45″N 1°06′42″E		1306304	Upload Photo	Q26593098
Ewings and Adjoining House to the East	II	Market Place			22 July 1983	TG0996222871; 52°45′45″N 1°06′38″E		1342828	Upload Photo	Q26626762
Hawk Lifting Services (adjoining Barclays Bank to the North)	II	Market Place			22 July 1983	TG0998222880; 52°45′46″N 1°06′39″E		1076838	Upload Photo	Q26342567
Iona House	II	Market Place			22 July 1983	TG0998122840; 52°45′44″N 1°06′39″E		1169917	Upload Photo	Q26463107
Ivy House	II	Market Place			22 July 1983	TG0996522846; 52°45′45″N 1°06′38″E		1076843	Upload Photo	Q26342584
K6 Telephone Kiosk	II	Market Place			14 February 1989	TG1001622851; 52°45′45″N 1°06′40″E		1249278	Upload Photo	Q26541429
Kings Arms	II	Market Place	pub		22 July 1983	TG1000822831; 52°45′44″N 1°06′40″E		1076845	Kings Arms More images	Q26342591
Riches Stores	II	Market Place			22 July 1983	TG1005922854; 52°45′45″N 1°06′43″E		1169977	Upload Photo	Q26463201
The Bircham Institute and Boundary Wall to West	II	Market Place			22 July 1983	TG1002722847; 52°45′45″N 1°06′41″E		1076846	Upload Photo	Q26342595
The Chimes Antiques	II	Market Place			22 July 1983	TG0998522895; 52°45′46″N 1°06′39″E		1076839	Upload Photo	Q26342570
The Old Bakery	II	Market Place			22 July 1983	TG1002422896; 52°45′46″N 1°06′41″E		1076841	Upload Photo	Q26342577
The Post Office	II	Market Place			22 July 1983	TG1006122881; 52°45′46″N 1°06′43″E		1169908	Upload Photo	Q26463093
The Stores and Adjoining House to the West	II	Market Place			22 July 1983	TG0994522875; 52°45′46″N 1°06′37″E		1076836	Upload Photo	Q26342560
Carlton House, Melton House and Railings	II	Melton House And Railings, Market Place			22 July 1983	TG1003922889; 52°45′46″N 1°06′42″E		1076842	Upload Photo	Q26342581
The Old Vicarage	II	Mill Road			22 July 1983	TG0992322353; 52°45′29″N 1°06′34″E		1342792	Upload Photo	Q26626729
Moor Farm Barn	II	Moor End, Reepham Moor			22 July 1983	TG1166023409; 52°46′00″N 1°08′09″E		1170036	Upload Photo	Q26463295
Moor Farm House	II	Moor End, Reepham Moor			22 July 1983	TG1167723393; 52°46′00″N 1°08′10″E		1342794	Upload Photo	Q26626731
Gate and Garden Wall, Moor Lodge	II	Moor Lodge, Reepham Moor			22 July 1983	TG1086623211; 52°45′55″N 1°07′27″E		1076849	Upload Photo	Q26342606
Beaver House	II	Norwich Road			22 July 1983	TG1022822906; 52°45′46″N 1°06′52″E		1169980	Upload Photo	Q26463204
The White House	II	Norwich Road			22 July 1983	TG1043222994; 52°45′49″N 1°07′03″E		1076847	Upload Photo	Q26342598
Echo Lodge	II	Ollands Road			22 July 1983	TG1018323072; 52°45′52″N 1°06′50″E		1169989	Upload Photo	Q26463215
Ye Olde Monastery	II	3 and 4, Reepham Moor			19 January 1952	TG1074623218; 52°45′56″N 1°07′20″E		1076848	Upload Photo	Q26342602
Manor Farm House	II	Reepham Moor			22 July 1983	TG1102723332; 52°45′59″N 1°07′35″E		1170016	Upload Photo	Q26463266
The Thatched Cottage	II	Reepham Moor			22 July 1983	TG1068323230; 52°45′56″N 1°07′17″E		1342793	Upload Photo	Q26685222
1-5, 7a, 7b, 9 and 11, Station Road	II	1-5, Station Road			22 July 1983	TG0992122877; 52°45′46″N 1°06′35″E		1076850	Upload Photo	Q26342609
Nos 1 and 2 Old Monastery Cottages	II	The Moor, Reepham Moor			27 February 2008	TG1073123218; 52°45′56″N 1°07′19″E		1392463	Upload Photo	Q26671680
Dairy Farm Barn	II	The Street, Whitwell			22 July 1983	TG1005622151; 52°45′22″N 1°06′41″E		1170086	Upload Photo	Q26463370
Hackford Hall	II	Whitwell			19 January 1952	TG0779122229; 52°45′28″N 1°04′40″E		1076851	Upload Photo	Q26342613
Jordans House	II	Whitwell			22 July 1983	TG0713021558; 52°45′07″N 1°04′04″E		1170096	Upload Photo	Q26463392
Malthouse Farm Barn	II	Whitwell			22 July 1983	TG0914621055; 52°44′48″N 1°05′50″E		1170107	Upload Photo	Q26463419
Malthouse Farmhouse	II	Whitwell			1 April 1982	TG0911921041; 52°44′47″N 1°05′48″E		1076852	Upload Photo	Q26342616
The Foldgate	II	Whitwell			22 July 1983	TG0832620532; 52°44′32″N 1°05′05″E		1342795	Upload Photo	Q26626732
The White House	II	Whitwell			22 July 1983	TG0872620592; 52°44′33″N 1°05′27″E		1076853	Upload Photo	Q26342621
Valley Farm Barn (10 Metres to East of Farm House)	II	Whitwell			22 July 1983	TG0770920541; 52°44′33″N 1°04′32″E		1170248	Upload Photo	Q26463576
Valley Farm House	II	Whitwell			22 July 1983	TG0767820546; 52°44′33″N 1°04′31″E		1342796	Upload Photo	Q26626733
Whitwell Hall	II	Whitwell			22 July 1983	TG0870321456; 52°45′01″N 1°05′27″E		1342797	Upload Photo	Q26626734

== See also ==
- Grade I listed buildings in Norfolk
- Grade II* listed buildings in Norfolk

== Sources ==
- Wilson, Bill; Pevsner, Nikolaus (1999) [1962], Norfolk 2: North-West and South, The Buildings of England, New Haven and London: Yale University Press, ISBN 978-0-300-09657-6
