= Listed buildings in Coltishall =

Non-Civil Parish in Norfolk, England

Coltishall is a village and civil parish in the Broadland district of Norfolk, England. It contains 45 listed buildings that are recorded in the National Heritage List for England. Of these one is grade I, three are grade II* and 41 are grade II.

This list is based on the information retrieved online from Historic England.

== Key ==
| Grade | Criteria |
|---|---|
| I | Buildings that are of exceptional interest |
| II* | Particularly important buildings of more than special interest |
| II | Buildings that are of special interest |

== Listing ==
| Name | Grade | Location | Type | Completed (Note: The date given is the date used by Historic England as significant for the initial building or that of an important part in the structure's description.) | Date designated | Grid ref. (Note: The grid reference is based on the British national grid reference system, sometimes known as OSGB36, used by the Ordnance Survey.) Geo-coordinates | Notes | Entry number (Note: The "List Entry Number" is a unique number assigned to each listed building and scheduled monument by Historic England.) | Image | Wikidata |
|---|---|---|---|---|---|---|---|---|---|---|
| Coltishall and Hautbois War Memorial | II | NR12 7AA | war memorial | | 23 February 2017 | TG2681019893; 52°43′45″N 1°21′28″E | | 1442412 | Coltishall and Hautbois War Memorial More images | Q66478473 |
| The Anchor | II | Anchor Street | | | 16 May 1984 | TG2806819465; 52°43′29″N 1°22′33″E | | 1372989 | Upload Photo | Q26654022 |
| The Old Maltings | II | Anchor Street | | | 16 May 1984 | TG2805019496; 52°43′30″N 1°22′33″E | | 1307278 | Upload Photo | Q26593967 |
| Holly Lodge | II | Church Loke, NR12 7DN | | | 19 January 1952 | TG2717919566; 52°43′34″N 1°21′46″E | | 1372992 | Upload Photo | Q26654024 |
| Church Stores | II | 9, Church Street | | | 10 May 1961 | TG2722119790; 52°43′41″N 1°21′49″E | | 1050883 | Upload Photo | Q26302817 |
| Barn and Attached Walls to East and West of the Old House | II | Church Street | | | 16 May 1984 | TG2691619761; 52°43′40″N 1°21′33″E | | 1050882 | Upload Photo | Q26302815 |
| Coltishall County Primary School | II | Church Street | | | 16 May 1984 | TG2701719767; 52°43′40″N 1°21′38″E | | 1177816 | Upload Photo | Q26472502 |
| Garden Walls and Forecourt Railings to South of the Old House | II | Church Street | | | 16 May 1984 | TG2695119730; 52°43′39″N 1°21′35″E | | 1177810 | Upload Photo | Q26472498 |
| Houses and Shop 10 Metres South West of the Old House | II | Church Street | | | 16 May 1984 | TG2691719728; 52°43′39″N 1°21′33″E | | 1307252 | Upload Photo | Q26593943 |
| Parish Church of St John the Baptist | I | Church Street | church building | | 10 May 1961 | TG2715419758; 52°43′40″N 1°21′45″E | | 1177913 | Parish Church of St John the Baptist More images | Q17535818 |
| Pebbledash | II | Church Street | | | 16 May 1984 | TG2690319734; 52°43′39″N 1°21′32″E | | 1050881 | Upload Photo | Q26302814 |
| Risings | II | Church Street | | | 16 May 1984 | TG2730619800; 52°43′41″N 1°21′54″E | | 1050884 | Upload Photo | Q26302818 |
| The Manor House | II | Church Street | | | 16 May 1984 | TG2751119664; 52°43′36″N 1°22′04″E | | 1050885 | Upload Photo | Q26302819 |
| The Mead | II | Church Street | | | 16 May 1984 | TG2709419474; 52°43′31″N 1°21′42″E | | 1307220 | Upload Photo | Q26593915 |
| The Old House | II* | Church Street | | | 10 May 1961 | TG2694219745; 52°43′40″N 1°21′34″E | | 1372990 | Upload Photo | Q17554350 |
| Forecourt Walls, Gates and Railings Colteshall Primary School | II | Gates And Railings Colteshall Primary School, Church Street | | | 16 May 1984 | TG2702319750; 52°43′40″N 1°21′39″E | | 1372991 | Upload Photo | Q26654023 |
| Colks Farm Barn | II | Great Hautbois | | | 16 May 1984 | TG2672621777; 52°44′46″N 1°21′28″E | | 1050880 | Upload Photo | Q26302813 |
| Colks Farm House | II | Great Hautbois | | | 16 May 1984 | TG2671821778; 52°44′46″N 1°21′27″E | | 1307308 | Upload Photo | Q26593996 |
| Church of St Theobald | II* | Great Hautbois Road, Norwich, NR12 7JW | church building | | 10 May 1961 | TG2616320432; 52°44′03″N 1°20′54″E | | 1295280 | Church of St Theobald More images | Q17554195 |
| Church Farm Barn | II | Hautbois Road, Great Hautbois | | | 16 May 1984 | TG2613820808; 52°44′15″N 1°20′54″E | | 1177987 | Upload Photo | Q26472665 |
| Church Farmhouse | II | Hautbois Road, Great Hautbois | | | 19 January 1952 | TG2609720840; 52°44′16″N 1°20′52″E | | 1050887 | Upload Photo | Q26302821 |
| Church of Holy Trinity | II | Hautbois Road, Great Hautbois | church building | | 16 May 1984 | TG2652220309; 52°43′59″N 1°21′13″E | | 1050886 | Church of Holy Trinity More images | Q26302820 |
| Antiques Emporium and Adjoining House | II | High Street | | | 16 May 1984 | TG2683419852; 52°43′43″N 1°21′29″E | | 1050889 | Upload Photo | Q26302823 |
| Bank House | II | High Street | | | 16 May 1984 | TG2684319817; 52°43′42″N 1°21′29″E | | 1178009 | Upload Photo | Q26472686 |
| Blacksmith's Yard | II | High Street | | | 16 May 1984 | TG2686819803; 52°43′42″N 1°21′30″E | | 1050891 | Upload Photo | Q26302825 |
| Cresta | II | High Street | | | 16 May 1984 | TG2684019821; 52°43′42″N 1°21′29″E | | 1050890 | Upload Photo | Q26302824 |
| Grove House | II | High Street | | | 16 May 1984 | TG2679719963; 52°43′47″N 1°21′27″E | | 1050888 | Upload Photo | Q26302822 |
| Point House | II | High Street | | | 10 May 1961 | TG2679319812; 52°43′42″N 1°21′26″E | | 1295256 | Upload Photo | Q26583007 |
| Old School House, Including Gate and Railings | II | Including Gate And Railings, Church Street | | | 10 May 1961 | TG2708519785; 52°43′41″N 1°21′42″E | | 1177847 | Upload Photo | Q26472531 |
| The Little Shop and China Cottage, Including Gates and Forecourt Railings | II | Including Gates And Forecourt Railings, High Street | | | 16 May 1984 | TG2683819829; 52°43′43″N 1°21′29″E | | 1178001 | Upload Photo | Q26472678 |
| Barn, 50 Metres to North of Thorncroft | II | 50 Metres To North Of Thorncroft, St James | | | 16 May 1984 | TG2797820442; 52°44′01″N 1°22′31″E | | 1050894 | Upload Photo | Q26302828 |
| Church Farm Barn | II | St James | | | 16 May 1984 | TG2787420444; 52°44′01″N 1°22′26″E | | 1372993 | Upload Photo | Q26687071 |
| Church Farm House | II | St James | | | 16 May 1984 | TG2789120398; 52°43′59″N 1°22′26″E | | 1295263 | Upload Photo | Q26583012 |
| Rosemary Cottage | II | St James | | | 16 May 1984 | TG2789120322; 52°43′57″N 1°22′26″E | | 1050893 | Upload Photo | Q26302827 |
| The Old Hall | II | St James | | | 16 May 1984 | TG2784520249; 52°43′55″N 1°22′23″E | | 1178022 | Upload Photo | Q26472699 |
| Limekiln About 140 Metres East of the Railway Public House | II | Station Road | | | 20 August 1991 | TG2692120175; 52°43′54″N 1°21′34″E | | 1248296 | Upload Photo | Q26540518 |
| The Beeches | II | Station Road | | | 16 May 1984 | TG2692120362; 52°44′00″N 1°21′35″E | | 1050892 | Upload Photo | Q26302826 |
| Hazlewood | II | White Lion Road | | | 10 May 1961 | TG2779619843; 52°43′42″N 1°22′20″E | | 1372954 | Upload Photo | Q26653992 |
| Lower House | II | White Lion Road | | | 10 May 1961 | TG2789220013; 52°43′47″N 1°22′25″E | | 1178039 | Upload Photo | Q26472717 |
| Barn, 100 Metres to North of the Manor House | II | 100 Metres To North Of The Manor House, Wroxham Road, NR12 7DU | | | 16 May 1984 | TG2747119722; 52°43′38″N 1°22′02″E | | 1177958 | Upload Photo | Q26472636 |
| Coltishall Hall | II | Wroxham Road, NR12 7AF | | | 16 May 1984 | TG2799019776; 52°43′39″N 1°22′30″E | | 1295234 | Upload Photo | Q26582989 |
| K6 Telephone Kiosk North of King's Head Inn | II | Wroxham Road | | | 24 May 1993 | TG2766219868; 52°43′43″N 1°22′13″E | | 1248297 | Upload Photo | Q26540519 |
| King's Head Public House | II | Wroxham Road | pub | | 19 January 1952 | TG2766419842; 52°43′42″N 1°22′13″E | | 1050852 | King's Head Public House More images | Q26302787 |
| The Limes and Attached Garden Walls | II* | Wroxham Road | | | 19 January 1952 | TG2759919831; 52°43′42″N 1°22′09″E | | 1295241 | Upload Photo | Q17554186 |
| The White House | II | Wroxham Road | | | 16 May 1984 | TG2768819886; 52°43′43″N 1°22′14″E | | 1050895 | Upload Photo | Q26302829 |

== See also ==
- Grade I listed buildings in Norfolk
- Grade II* listed buildings in Norfolk

== Sources ==
- Wilson, Bill; Pevsner, Nikolaus (1999) [1962], Norfolk 2: North-West and South, The Buildings of England, New Haven and London: Yale University Press, ISBN 978-0-300-09657-6
