= Aylsham =

Town in Norfolk, England

Coordinates: 52.79°N 1.256°E

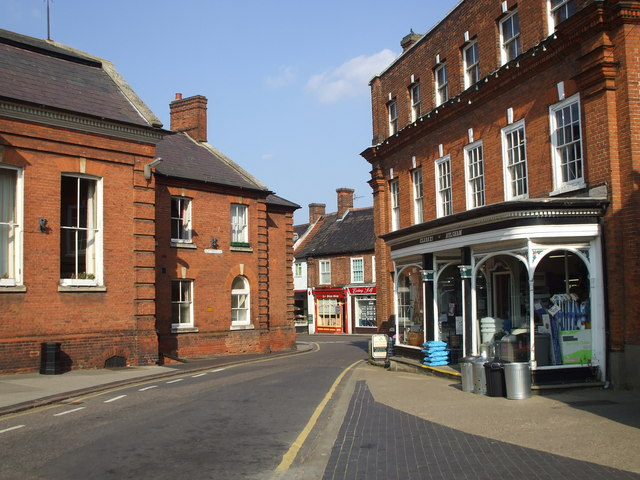
- The town centre, just off Market Place

- Location within Norfolk
- Population: 7,568 (2021 census)
- Civil parish: Aylsham
- District: Broadland
- Shire county: Norfolk
- Region: East
- Country: England
- Sovereign state: United Kingdom
- Post town: Norwich
- Postcode district: NR11
- Dialling code: 01263
- Police: Norfolk
- Fire: Norfolk
- Ambulance: East of England
- UK Parliament: Broadland and Fakenham

Aylsham is a historic market town and civil parish in north Norfolk, England. It lies on the river Bure, nearly 9 mi (14 km) north of Norwich. The town is close to Blickling, Felbrigg, Mannington and Wolterton Halls, which are popular tourist attractions. The parish had a population of 7,568 at the 2021 census. For local government, the parish is in the Broadland district.

== History ==
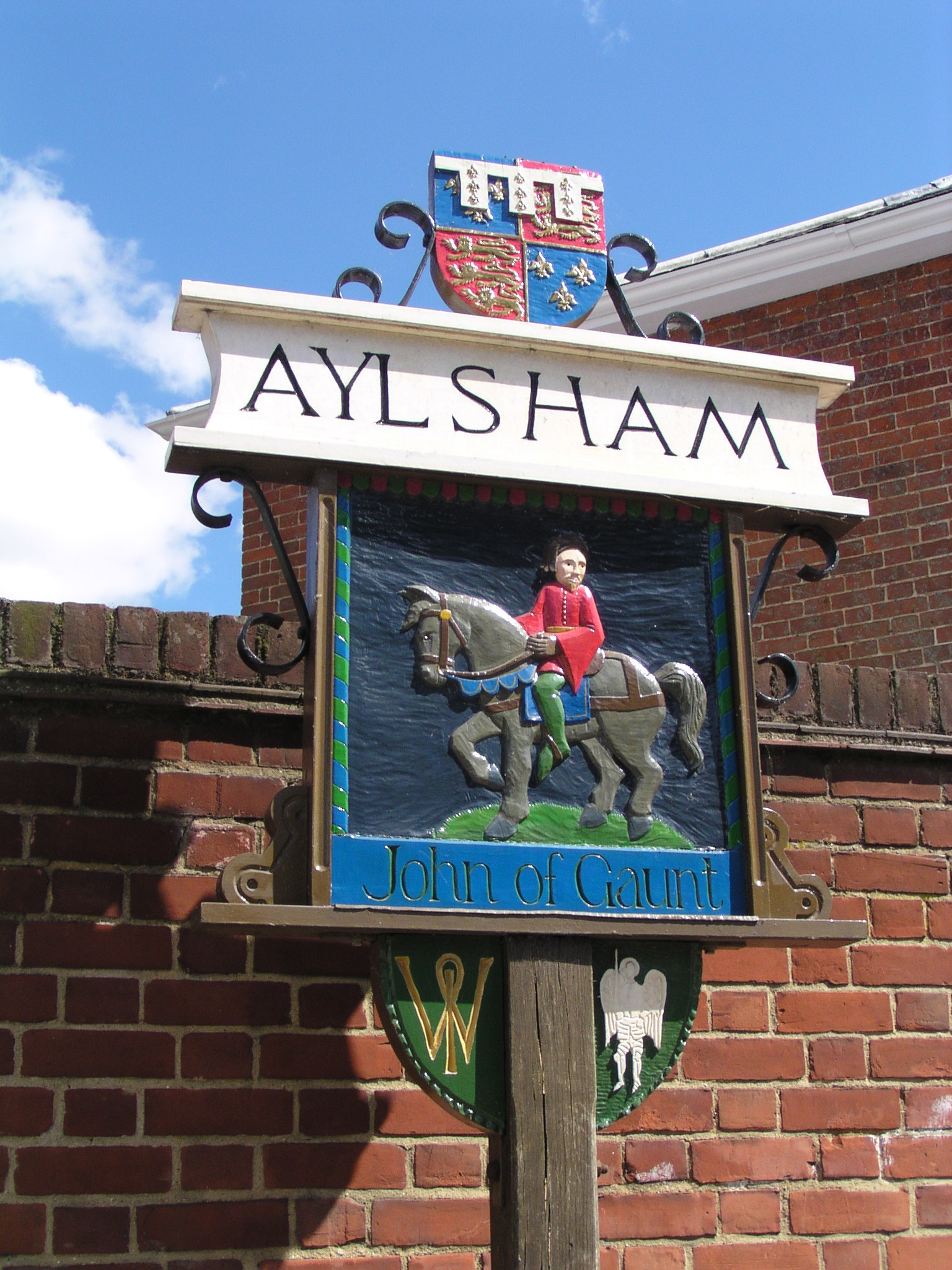
An Aylsham town sign that depicts John of Gaunt, lord of the manor from 1372

Archaeological evidence shows that the site of the town of Aylsham has been occupied since prehistoric times. The town lies just over 2 miles (3.2 km) from a Roman settlement at Brampton. The settlement was linked to Venta Icenorum at Caistor St Edmund, south of Norwich, by a Roman road which can still be traced in places. The site had maritime links to the rest of the Roman Empire. Excavations during the 1970s provided evidence of several kilns, showing that this was an industrial centre, pottery and metal items being the main items manufactured there.

Aylsham is thought to have been founded around 500 AD by an Anglo Saxon thegn called Aegel, Aegel's Ham, meaning "Aegel's settlement". The town is mentioned in the Domesday Book (1086) as Elesham and Ailesham, and as having a population of about 1,000. Until the 15th century, the production of linen and worsted was important. 'Aylsham webb' or 'cloth of Aylsham' was supplied to the royal palaces of Edward II and III.

John of Gaunt was lord of the manor from 1372, although he probably never came to Aylsham. As the principal local town of the Duchy of Lancaster; as a result, the townspeople enjoyed privileges, including exemption from jury service outside the manor and from payment of certain taxes.

In 1519, Henry VIII granted the town a regular Saturday market and an annual fair to be held on 12 March, the eve of the feast of St Gregory. Aylsham market has remained an important feature of the town, as businesses developed to meet the needs of the town and the farming lands around it. Besides weekly markets there were cattle fairs twice a year and a hiring fair in October.

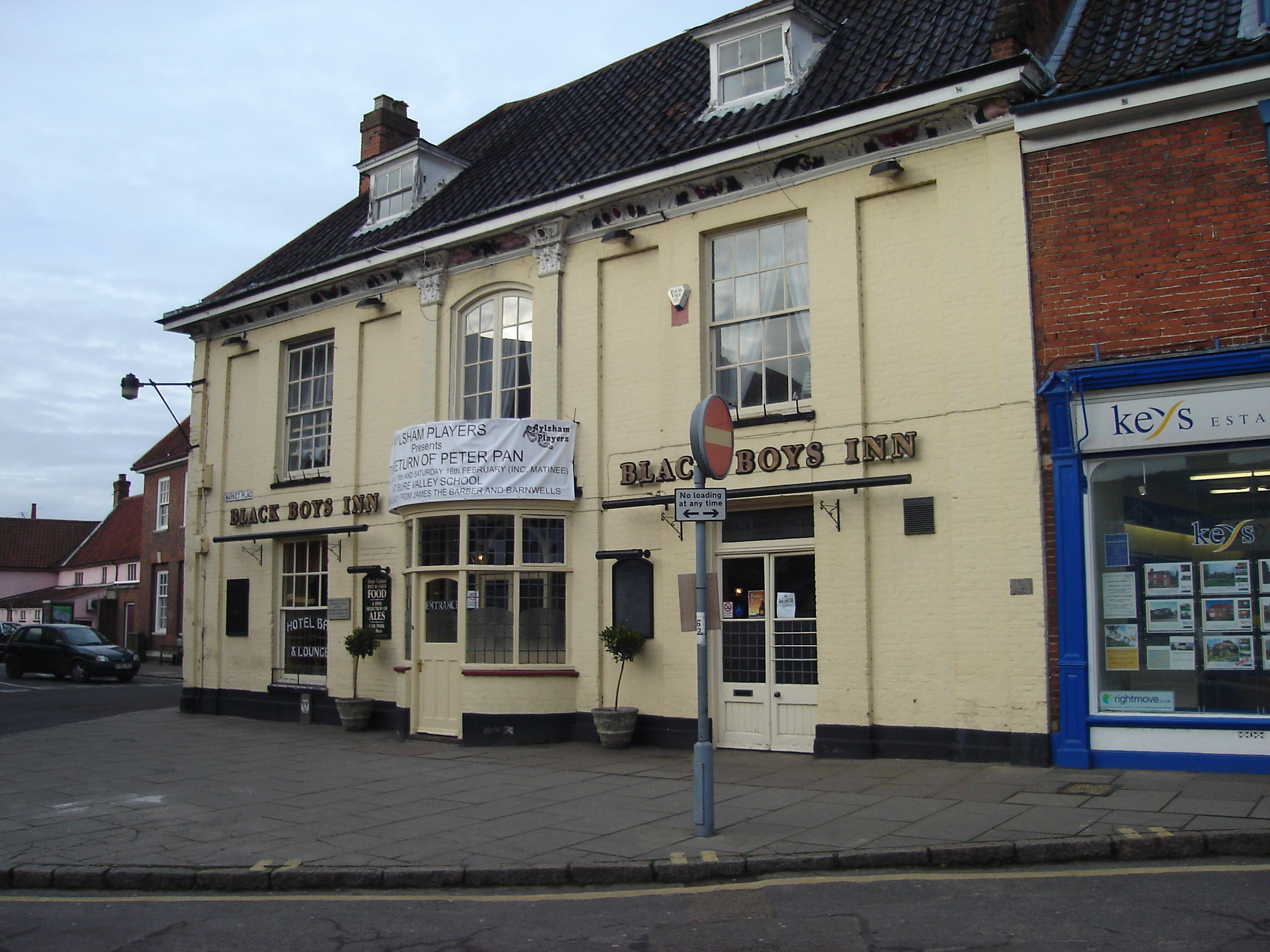
Black Boys Inn

The Black Boys Inn is one of Aylsham's oldest surviving buildings. It has been on the same site since the 1650s, although the present frontage dates to between 1710 and 1720. There is a frieze of small black boys on the cornice. The inn was a stop for the post coach from Norwich to Cromer; it had stabling for 40 horses, employing three ostlers and four postboys.

A thatched waterpump was built in 1911 at Carr's Corner in memory of John Soame. It pumped water from a 170 feet (52 m) deep artesian well. The canopy is thatched in Norfolk reed.

As with other market towns in Norfolk, the weaving of local cloth brought prosperity to the town in medieval times. Until the 15th century, it was the manufacture of linen which was the more important, and Aylsham linens and Aylsham canvases were nationally known. From the 16th century linen manufacture declined and wool became more important, a situation that continued until the coming of the Industrial Revolution. Thereafter the principal trade of the town for the 19th century was grain and timber, together with the range of trades to be found in a town which supported local agriculture. Annual horse fairs would bring many other traders to the town and the weekly market would be the occasion for more local trade. The rights of the stallholders in the market place today date back to the rights established in medieval times.

Aylsham was once noted for its spa, situated south of the town; it comprised a chalybeate spring, formerly used by those suffering from asthma and other chronic conditions.

Aylsham came fourth in the world in an international competition celebrating liveable communities, winning a silver award in category A (towns with a population up to 20,000) of the International Awards for Liveable Communities held in 2005.

== Governance ==
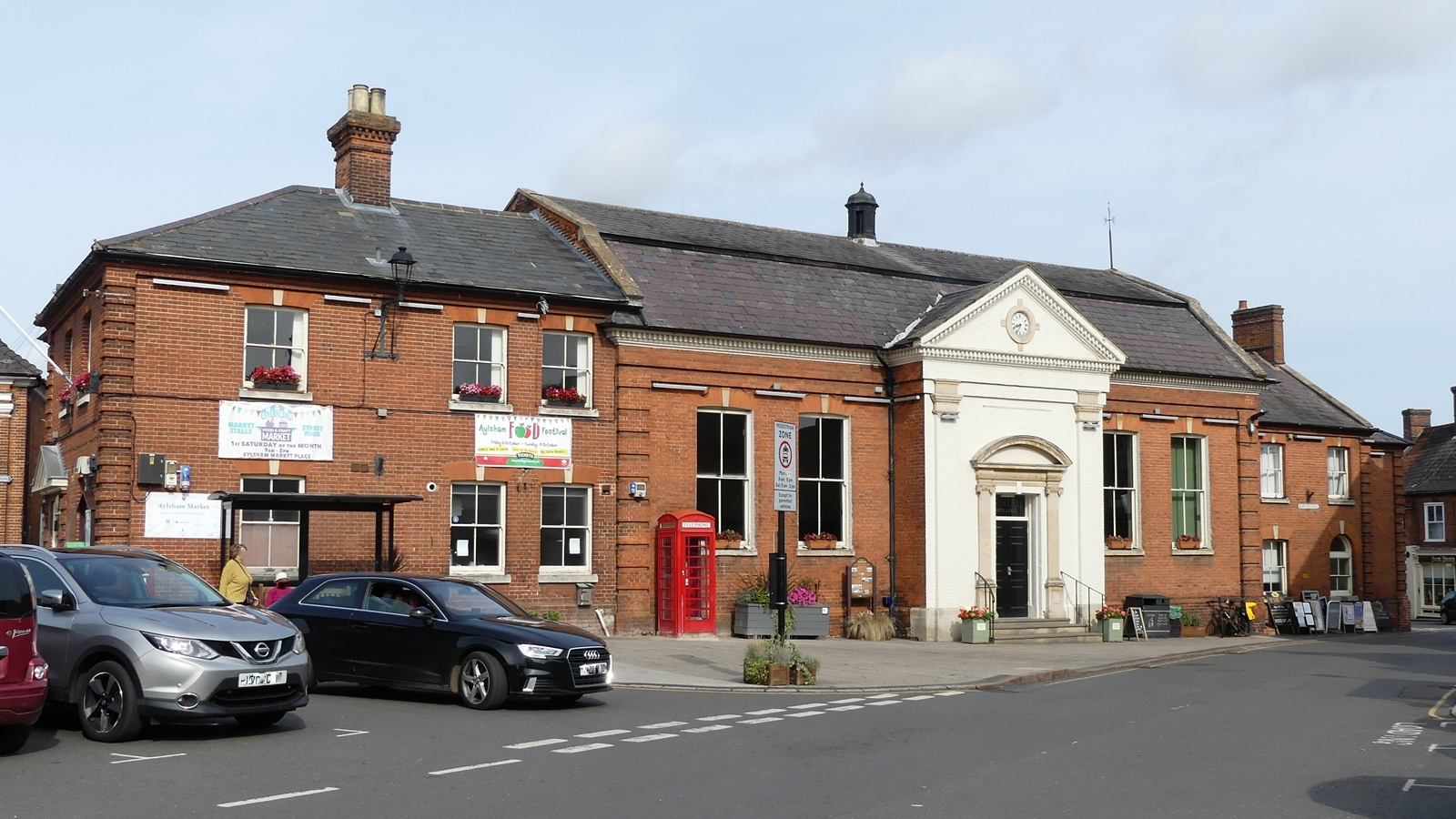
Aylsham Town Hall

At the lowest level of local government, Aylsham is a civil parish with a town council of 13 elected members, which is based at Aylsham Town Hall.

Aylsham is in the non-metropolitan district of Broadland and non-metropolitan county of Norfolk. For elections to both councils, it is in Aylsham electoral ward, which also includes the neighbouring parishes of Blickling, Brampton, Burgh and Tuttington, Buxton with Lammas, Marsham, and Oulton. It is represented by three members on the district council, and one member on Norfolk County Council.

Historically, Aylsham was part of the South Erpingham Hundred. It was in St Faith's and Aylsham Rural District from 1894 until 1974, when it became part of Broadland district. In medieval times, the parish of Aylsham was established as four manors: the main manor of Lancaster, Vicarage manor, Sexton's manor and Bolwick manor. The ownership of the Lancaster manor changed hands many times before James I assigned it to his son, the future Charles I. In the course of the events which led up to the English Civil War, Charles I had to raise as much money as possible and mortgaged Lancaster manor to the City of London Corporation. The corporation eventually sold it to Sir John Hobart and, through him, it passed to the ownership of the Blickling Estate. The manor is now owned by the National Trust.

== Demographics ==
Census population of Aylsham parish
Census	Population	Female	Male	Households	Source
2001	5,504	2,869	2,635	2,448	
2011	6,016	3,162	2,854	2,770	
2021	7,568	3,993	3,575	3,496	

== Culture ==
The 'Market Towns Initiative' finished in 2004, but the partnership successfully bid for funding to take part in the Cittaslow pilot project and to sustain work on traffic management and industrial heritage. As a result, Aylsham became one of the founding towns and the first in Norfolk, of the Cittaslow movement, an international organisation promoting the concept of 'Slow Towns'. (Note: Described as "a network of towns where quality of life is important.") It is claimed that Aylsham did not have to change to become a member, as it was already a clear example of the type of community advocated by the Cittaslow movement.

Local entertainment in the town includes concerts by the Aylsham Band, one or two productions a year by the Aylsham Players, and an annual school musical by Aylsham High School.

The annual Aylsham Show features agricultural exhibits and takes place on August bank holiday Monday at nearby Blickling Park.

The Aylsham Heritage Centre is located in a Victorian building within the grounds of St Michael's Church. Archives stored at the centre can be used to research the town's past.

== Parish church ==
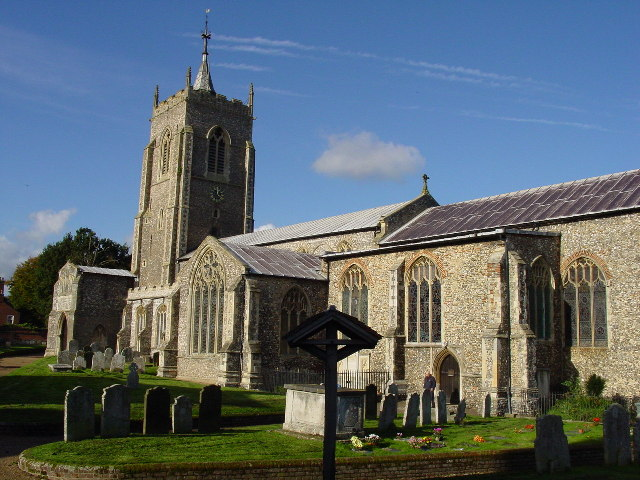
The parish church of St Michael and All Angels

The market place and surrounding area is dominated by the tower of the Church of St Michael a fine example of Gothic architecture of the Decorated style. The small spire on top of the 98 feet (30 m) tower is also a landmark that can be seen for miles around. The nave, aisles and chancel were built in the 13th century. The tower and ground floor of the south porch were added in the 14th century. The north transept was built under the patronage of John of Gaunt, Duke of Lancaster around 1380; an upper floor to the porch was added in 1488. The lower part of the rood screen survived the destruction visited by Oliver Cromwell and the Puritans, although some of the painted panels were disfigured.

== Transport ==
=== Roads ===
Aylsham was the principal coaching point on the Norwich-Cromer road and the meeting point for other roads. Each day, the coaches from Cromer and Holt would draw up at the Black Boys, the main inn in the market place. Coaching ended with the coming of the railways in the 1880s.

The town is now located on the A140 road, a route which runs between Ipswich, Norwich and Cromer.

=== Buses ===
The town is served by the X41, 43 and X44 routes that are operated between Norwich, Cromer and Sheringham by Sanders Coaches. Other services link the town to surrounding villages and towns, including Wroxham, East Dereham, North Walsham and Felbrigg.

=== Railways ===
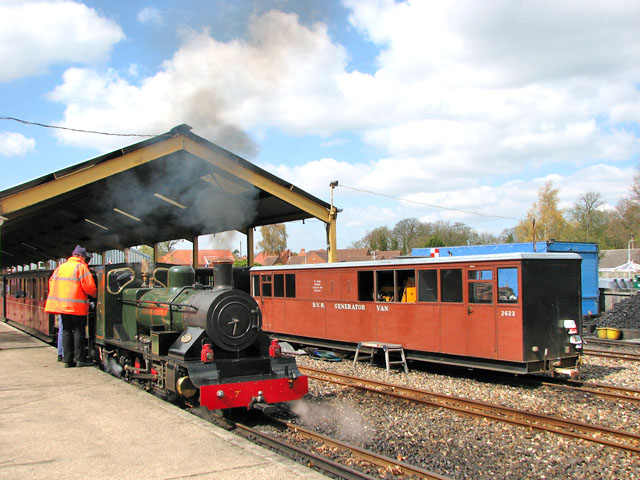
The Bure Valley Railway's western terminus at Aylsham South

There were many different plans for railways, but eventually two lines served the town, with two railway stations, which were both closed in the 1950s:

- Aylsham North was a stop on the Midland and Great Northern Joint Railway line between Melton Constable and Yarmouth Beach
- Aylsham South was on the Great Eastern line between County School, near North Elmham, and Wroxham.

A third station, Aylsham was built on the site of the former Aylsham South in 1990. This is the northern terminus for the Bure Valley Railway, a 15 in (381 mm) narrow gauge heritage railway, which runs to Wroxham, 9 miles (14 km) away.

Several long distance footpaths with a railway theme start or pass through the town:

- Bure Valley Path runs alongside the heritage railway line
- Marriott's Way follows the old trackbed from Aylsham South to Norwich, via the Themelthorpe Curve
- Weavers' Way, on the former railway line between Cromer and Great Yarmouth, which can be accessed at the former site of Aylsham North station; it passes Blickling Hall.

=== Waterways ===
The ancient but natural transport route for Aylsham would have been the river Bure, but it was not open to substantial navigation. There was a scheme in the 18th century to widen the navigation from Coltishall to Aylsham and, after many difficulties, trading wherries from Great Yarmouth were able to reach a staithe at Aylsham. The end for this scheme was the devastating flood of 1912.

== Media ==
Local news and television programmes are provided by BBC East and ITV Anglia. Television signals are received from the Tacolneston transmitting station.

Local radio stations are BBC Radio Norfolk on 95.1 FM, Heart East on 102.4 FM, Greatest Hits Radio East (formerly Radio Norwich 99.9) on 99.9 FM and Kiss on 106.1 FM.

The town is served by the local newspaper, Eastern Daily Press.

== Notable people ==
- Thomas Hudson, a glover of Aylsham, is recorded as one of the Protestant martyrs condemned to death for his faith under the reign of Mary I of England, towards the end of her reign. He was burned at the stake at the Lollards Pit, outside Bishopsgate in Norwich, on 19 May 1558.
- Jerome Alexander (died 1670), a High Court judge in Ireland, who was noted for his exceptional severity, attended the local school in c. 1600.
- Christopher Layer (born 1683), was a militant Jacobite and supporter of Prince Charles Edward Stuart, the 'Young Pretender'. He was tried for high treason and hanged at Tyburn in 1723, for his part in the Atterbury Plot. A commemorative plaque on the wall of the former Barclays Bank in Market Place commemorates this.
- Humphry Repton (1752–1818), the landscape gardener who lived at nearby Sustead, is buried in St Michael's Churchyard. His watercolour paintings provide a record of Market Place in the early 19th century.
- James Bulwer (1794–1879), collector, naturalist, artist and conchologist, was born in Aylsham.
- Joseph Thomas Clover (1825–1882), the father of modern anaesthetics, who was born above a shop in the town; a plaque marks this building.
- Clive Payne (b. 1950), former professional footballer for Norwich City and AFC Bournemouth was born in Aylsham.
- Nick Youngs (b. 1959) and his two sons, Ben and Tom, are former England national rugby union team players.

== Twinning ==
The town is twinned with La Chaussée-Saint-Victor in Loir-et-Cher, France.

== See also ==
- Listed buildings in Aylsham
