= Salhouse =

Village in Norfolk, England

Coordinates: 52.6708°N 1.39657°E

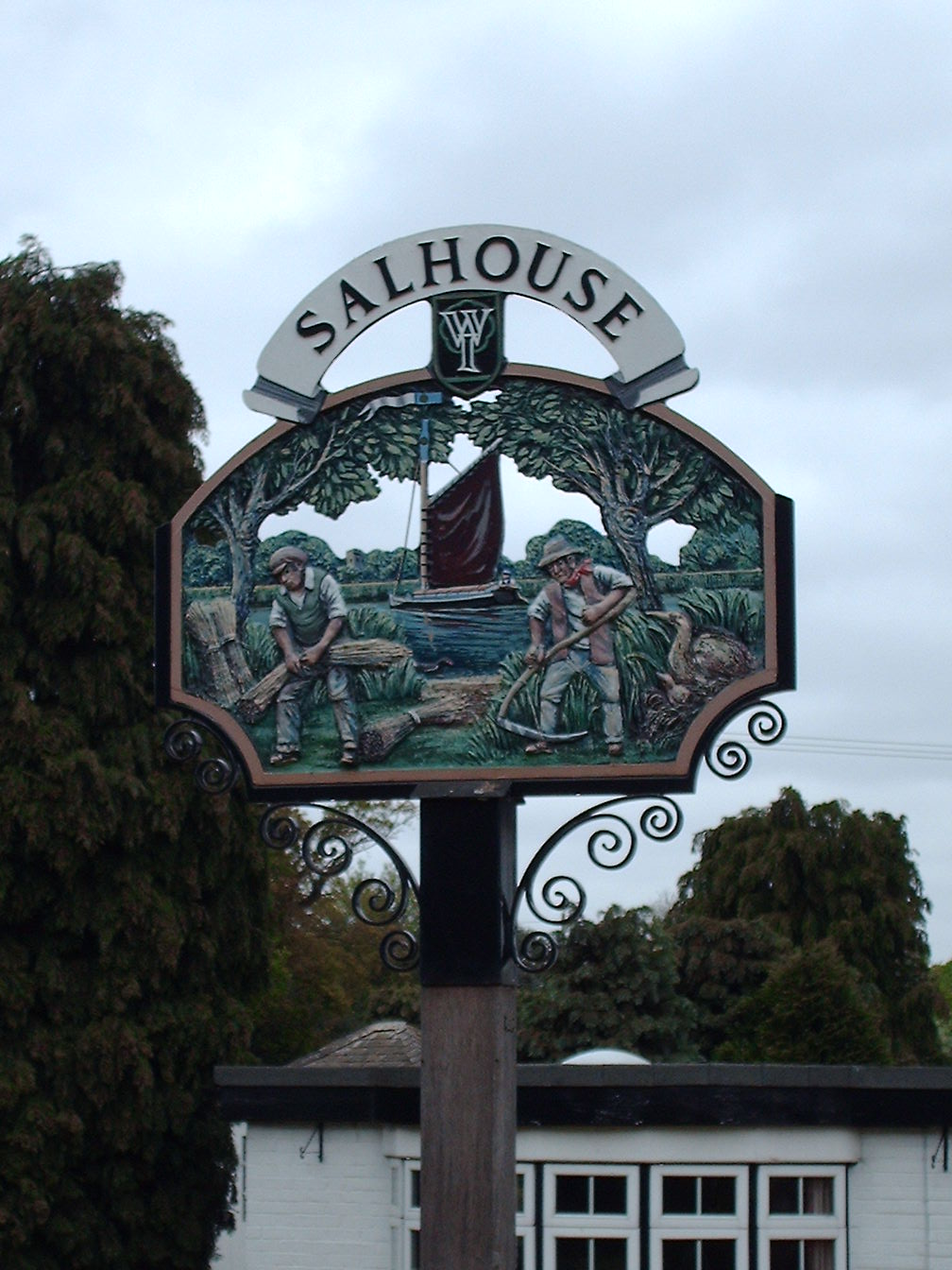
- Salhouse village sign

- Location within Norfolk
- Area: 8.96 km^{2} (3.46 sq mi)
- Population: 1,486 (2011)
  - Density: 166/km^{2} (430/sq mi)
- OS grid reference: TG297135
- Civil parish: Salhouse
- District: Broadland
- Shire county: Norfolk
- Region: East
- Country: England
- Sovereign state: United Kingdom
- Post town: NORWICH
- Postcode district: NR13
- Dialling code: 01603
- Police: Norfolk
- Fire: Norfolk
- Ambulance: East of England
- UK Parliament: Broadland and Fakenham

Salhouse is a village and civil parish in the Broads in the English county of Norfolk. It lies south of the River Bure and Salhouse Broad, about 6.2 miles (10 km) north-east of Norwich. The civil parish has an area of 8.96 km^{2} (3.46 sq mi) and in the 2001 census had a population of 1,462 in 604 households, increasing to 1,486 in 638 households at the 2011 Census. For the purposes of local government, the parish falls within the district of Broadland although areas adjoining the river and broad fall into the executive area of the Broads Authority.

In local dialect, Salhouse may be pronounced "Sayllus", "Sallus/Sallers" or "Sallas". Professor Trudgill argues: "The house in Salhouse has nothing to do with a house. The way we spell Salhouse today is due to what linguists call 'folk etymology'. People have a tendency to try to make sense of words which do not make sense ... The spelling of Salhouse came about because people no longer understood the original name, which was Sallows. Sallow was the ancient name for a kind of willow tree, so Sallows just mean 'place with willow trees'... When Sallows no longer meant anything to people, writing the second part of the word as house made it sound a bit more transparent. But nowadays something else is happening. Because of the spelling, some people are even beginning to pronounce the name like that too: 'Sal-house'. That is not the right way to say it: it should be 'Sallas'."

== Churches ==
All Saints Church, which is thatched and believed to date mainly from the 14th century (little remaining of an older chapel on the site), stands on a hill beside the B1140 Salhouse-Wroxham Road. The church contains among other features an oak rood screen, a unique sacring bell which hangs in the chancel and dates from the reign of Queen Mary, and two coffin lids discovered under the nave floor in 1839 and dated to the 13th century. There is also a red brick Baptist church in Chapel Loke, off Lower Street, which dates from 1802.

== Other buildings and facilities ==
To the west of All Saints Church stands the Grade II listed Salhouse Hall, built in red brick with limestone detailing, was uninhabited for 30 years before being refurbished for cottage rental. Parts of this building may date from the 16th century although it is mostly 18th century with 19th-century Gothic style remodelling. The village also features the Bell Inn, a 17th-century public house and the Lodge Inn, which is located halfway between Salhouse and Wroxham. Salhouse is served by Salhouse railway station, located on the Bittern Line which runs between Norwich and Sheringham via Cromer and once featured two waiting rooms, although they are no longer in regular use. Salhouse has a post office, village store and coffee shop in Lower Street and several other small businesses including kennels and a Potter.

== Salhouse Broad ==
The 32-acre Salhouse Broad, lying about half a mile to the north of the village, is privately owned and jointly managed with the local community. It is accessible by boat from the River Bure and via a footpath from the village.

== Toponymy ==
Salhouse is first recorded in 1291 as Salhus. The first element is believed to derive from Old English salh "sallow", a kind of willow. The word still exists in dial. English saugh. Sallow descends itself from OE inflexional salg- (ME salwe).

The second element is the Old English hūs or Old Norse hús "house".

Homonymy with Sahurs (Normandy, Salhus ar. 1024) in the low Seine valley, which shows together with other place-names and anthroponyms in Normandy, that there were Anglo-Saxons among the Danish settlers.

A further variation on the spelling may be seen as "Psalhous" in 1452.

== Rackheath Eco Town ==
During 2008, proposals were made for a controversial new eco-town, to contain over 3,000 homes, to be built in Rackheath and Salhouse. The proposals have attracted much criticism, mainly because it is to be built on a greenfield site, within a mile of The Broads National Park.

== See also ==
- Milestones Hospital
