= Listed buildings in Blickling =

Non-Civil Parish in Norfolk, England

Blickling is a village and civil parish in the Broadland district of Norfolk, England. It contains 31 listed buildings that are recorded in the National Heritage List for England. Of these three are grade I, three are grade II* and 25 are grade II.

This list is based on the information retrieved online from Historic England.

== Key ==
Grade	Criteria
I	Buildings that are of exceptional interest
II*	Particularly important buildings of more than special interest
II	Buildings that are of special interest

== Listing ==
Name	Grade	Location	Type	Completed (Note: The date given is the date used by Historic England as significant for the initial building or that of an important part in the structure's description.)	Date designated	Grid ref. (Note: The grid reference is based on the British national grid reference system, sometimes known as OSGB36, used by the Ordnance Survey.) Geo-coordinates	Notes	Entry number (Note: The "List Entry Number" is a unique number assigned to each listed building and scheduled monument by Historic England.)	Image	Wikidata
Fountain, Approximately 50 Metres East of Blickling Hall	II	Approximately 50 Metres East Of Blickling Hall			28 March 1988	TG1795228668; 52°48′41″N 1°13′57″E		1051430	Upload Photo	Q26303302
Blickling Hall	I		English country house		19 January 1952	TG1789428689; 52°48′42″N 1°13′54″E		1051428	Blickling Hall More images	Q17535638
Four Garden Urns East of Blickling Hall	II				28 March 1988	TG1800128674; 52°48′41″N 1°14′00″E		1051431	Upload Photo	Q26303303
K6 Telephone Kiosk to South of Church of St Andrews	II				9 April 1990	TG1787328388; 52°48′32″N 1°13′52″E		1051419	Upload Photo	Q26303294
Pair of Garden Urns at Base of Steps on East Side of Formal Gardens	II				28 March 1988	TG1800528643; 52°48′40″N 1°14′00″E		1372693	Upload Photo	Q26653781
Pair of Urns to North and South of the Doric Temple	II				28 March 1988	TG1829328646; 52°48′40″N 1°14′15″E		1051433	Upload Photo	Q26303304
Service Range to South East of Blickling Hall	I		building		28 March 1988	TG1789428626; 52°48′40″N 1°13′54″E		1051429	Service Range to South East of Blickling Hall More images	Q17535645
Service Range to South West of Blickling Hall	I				28 March 1988	TG1784128643; 52°48′41″N 1°13′51″E		1372691	Upload Photo	Q88200605
Terrace Walls and Steps to Parterre Garden East of Blickling Hall	II				28 March 1988	TG1799728612; 52°48′39″N 1°13′59″E		1372692	Upload Photo	Q26653780
The Doric Temple	II*		architectural structure		19 January 1952	TG1823628530; 52°48′36″N 1°14′12″E		1051432	The Doric Temple More images	Q17553998
The Orangery	II				19 January 1952	TG1811428408; 52°48′33″N 1°14′05″E		1051434	Upload Photo	Q26303305
Church of St Andrew	II*	Aylsham Road	church building		10 May 1961	TG1787328455; 52°48′35″N 1°13′52″E		1171857	Church of St Andrew More images	Q17554156
Flashpit Farmhouse	II	Aylsham Road			19 January 1952	TG1843527988; 52°48′19″N 1°14′21″E		1171851	Upload Photo	Q26466440
Milestone on North Side of B1354	II	Aylsham Road			28 March 1988	TG1677228476; 52°48′37″N 1°12′54″E		1305386	Upload Photo	Q26592256
Milestone on North Side of B1354 Approx 280m West of Flashpit Farmhouse	II	Aylsham Road			28 March 1988	TG1820728153; 52°48′24″N 1°14′09″E		1051435	Upload Photo	Q26303306
Stables About 35 Metres North of Old Rectory	II	Aylsham Road			7 March 1994	TG1792228486; 52°48′35″N 1°13′55″E		1251008	Upload Photo	Q26543010
The Tower House	II	Aylsham Road	house		28 March 1988	TG1607728817; 52°48′49″N 1°12′17″E		1051436	The Tower House More images	Q26303307
The Mausoleum	II*	Blickling Park	architectural structure		19 January 1952	TG1662529463; 52°49′09″N 1°12′48″E		1051437	The Mausoleum More images	Q17554002
Blickling Lodge	II	Cromer Road			19 January 1952	TG1942828022; 52°48′18″N 1°15′14″E		1305391	Upload Photo	Q26592261
53 and 54, Moorgate	II	53 and 54, Moorgate			10 May 1961	TG1819329629; 52°49′12″N 1°14′12″E		1171921	Upload Photo	Q26466580
Park Farmhouse	II	Moorgate			28 March 1988	TG1802529613; 52°49′12″N 1°14′03″E		1051439	Upload Photo	Q26303309
Former Blickling School, Attached School House and Service Yard	II	Norwich, NR11 6NF			23 February 2015	TG1748928557; 52°48′38″N 1°13′32″E		1423657	Upload Photo	Q26677040
Cottage Immediately North of Buckinghamshire Arms	II	8, Park Gates			28 March 1988	TG1767128613; 52°48′40″N 1°13′42″E		1051441	Upload Photo	Q26303311
Buckinghamshire Arms Public House	II	Park Gates	pub		19 January 1952	TG1769228562; 52°48′38″N 1°13′43″E		1051440	Buckinghamshire Arms Public House More images	Q26303310
Stables 40m West of Buckinghamshire Arms	II	Park Gates			28 March 1988	TG1762528554; 52°48′38″N 1°13′39″E		1305365	Upload Photo	Q26592238
Walled Garden to South-west of Blickling Hall	II	Park Gates			28 March 1988	TG1770928656; 52°48′41″N 1°13′44″E		1171933	Upload Photo	Q26466601
18, 19 and 20, Silvergate	II	18, 19 and 20, Silvergate			28 March 1988	TG1744627863; 52°48′16″N 1°13′28″E		1372694	Upload Photo	Q26653782
31, Silvergate	II	31, Silvergate			12 August 1980	TG1751827875; 52°48′16″N 1°13′32″E		1051442	Upload Photo	Q26303312
Ice House	II	Silvergate Lane			28 March 1988	TG1784228378; 52°48′32″N 1°13′51″E		1171937	Upload Photo	Q26466608
Cottages Immediately South East of Blickling Hall	II	9 and 10, The Farmyard			28 March 1988	TG1789428509; 52°48′36″N 1°13′54″E		1171915	Upload Photo	Q26466568
L Shaped Range of Barns Immediately South East of Blickling Hall	II	The Farmyard			28 March 1988	TG1792728586; 52°48′39″N 1°13′56″E		1051438	Upload Photo	Q26303308

== See also ==
- Grade I listed buildings in Norfolk
- Grade II* listed buildings in Norfolk

== Sources ==
- Wilson, Bill; Pevsner, Nikolaus (1999) [1962], Norfolk 2: North-West and South, The Buildings of England, New Haven and London: Yale University Press, ISBN 978-0-300-09657-6
