= Listed buildings in Aylsham =

Non-Civil Parish in Norfolk, England

Aylsham is a town and civil parish in the Broadland district of Norfolk, England. It contains 172 listed buildings that are recorded in the National Heritage List for England. Of these two are grade I, four are grade II* and 166 are grade II.

This list is based on the information retrieved online from Historic England.

== Key ==
Grade	Criteria
I	Buildings that are of exceptional interest
II*	Particularly important buildings of more than special interest
II	Buildings that are of special interest

== Listing ==
Name	Grade	Location	Type	Completed (Note: The date given is the date used by Historic England as significant for the initial building or that of an important part in the structure's description.)	Date designated	Grid ref. (Note: The grid reference is based on the British national grid reference system, sometimes known as OSGB36, used by the Ordnance Survey.) Geo-coordinates	Notes	Entry number (Note: The "List Entry Number" is a unique number assigned to each listed building and scheduled monument by Historic England.)	Image	Wikidata
Bolwick Hall	II		house		1 June 1984	TG1993624440; 52°46′22″N 1°15′33″E		1372982	Bolwick Hall More images	Q4940294
Bolwick Hall Farm	II				1 June 1984	TG2018324648; 52°46′28″N 1°15′46″E		1372983	Upload Photo	Q26654017
Garden House at Bolwick Hall	II				1 June 1984	TG1991824457; 52°46′22″N 1°15′32″E		1050871	Upload Photo	Q26302804
Stable Block at Bolwick Hall	II				1 June 1984	TG1991624490; 52°46′23″N 1°15′32″E		1050872	Upload Photo	Q26302805
Barns Immediately North of the Old Hall	II	Blickling Road			19 January 1952	TG1882827481; 52°48′02″N 1°14′41″E		1050831	Upload Photo	Q26302766
Dorset House North Side	II	Blickling Road			1 June 1984	TG1898027094; 52°47′49″N 1°14′48″E		1050873	Upload Photo	Q26302806
Garden Walls to West of Old Hall	II	Blickling Road			1 June 1984	TG1880827424; 52°48′00″N 1°14′40″E		1373003	Upload Photo	Q26654033
The Old Hall	I	Blickling Road	architectural structure		19 January 1952	TG1884527424; 52°48′00″N 1°14′42″E		1050830	The Old Hall More images	Q17535564
1 and 3, Bure Way	II	1 and 3, Bure Way			1 June 1984	TG1934627330; 52°47′56″N 1°15′08″E		1373004	Upload Photo	Q26654034
21 and 23, Bure Way	II	21 and 23, Bure Way			1 June 1984	TG1940127314; 52°47′55″N 1°15′11″E		1050832	Upload Photo	Q26302767
27, Bure Way	II	27, Bure Way			1 June 1984	TG1943727305; 52°47′55″N 1°15′13″E		1050833	Upload Photo	Q26302768
1, Burgh Road	II	1, Burgh Road			1 June 1984	TG1934326873; 52°47′41″N 1°15′07″E		1050834	Upload Photo	Q26302769
Nos 3 and 5 St Brides Including Boundary Wall	II	3 and 5, Burgh Road			1 June 1984	TG1935626869; 52°47′41″N 1°15′08″E		1373006	Upload Photo	Q26654036
Bure Valley Farmhouse	II	Burgh Road			19 January 1952	TG2040526424; 52°47′25″N 1°16′02″E		1373005	Upload Photo	Q26654035
Diggens Farmhouse	II	Buxton Road			1 June 1984	TG2003626089; 52°47′15″N 1°15′42″E		1050835	Upload Photo	Q26302770
52, Cawston Road	II	52, Cawston Road			1 June 1984	TG1898426740; 52°47′38″N 1°14′47″E		1373007	Upload Photo	Q26654037
The Feathers Public House	II	54, Cawston Road	pub		1 June 1984	TG1897326733; 52°47′37″N 1°14′47″E		1169080	The Feathers Public House More images	Q26462295
Barn Immediately North of Woodgate Farmhouse	II	Cawston Road			1 June 1984	TG1768826314; 52°47′26″N 1°13′37″E		1373008	Upload Photo	Q26654038
Coach House North of Woodgate House	II	Cawston Road			1 June 1984	TG1811926015; 52°47′15″N 1°14′00″E		1050838	Upload Photo	Q26302773
Garden Walls at Woodgate House	II	Cawston Road			1 June 1984	TG1810726006; 52°47′15″N 1°13′59″E		1169154	Upload Photo	Q26462361
Oak Lodge	II	Cawston Road			25 June 1981	TG1859426479; 52°47′30″N 1°14′26″E		1050836	Upload Photo	Q26302771
Sankence Lodge	II	Cawston Road			8 August 1977	TG1748325841; 52°47′11″N 1°13′25″E		1373009	Upload Photo	Q26654039
St Michael's Hospital	II	Cawston Road			1 June 1984	TG1845026651; 52°47′35″N 1°14′19″E		1306685	Upload Photo	Q26593438
Woodgate Farmhouse	II	Cawston Road			1 June 1984	TG1770826268; 52°47′24″N 1°13′38″E		1050837	Upload Photo	Q26302772
Woodgate House	II	Cawston Road			1 June 1984	TG1812325990; 52°47′15″N 1°14′00″E		1169138	Upload Photo	Q26462347
Aylsham War Memorial	II	Church Hill, NR11 6HE	war memorial		17 October 2016	TG1931227053; 52°47′47″N 1°15′06″E		1438872	Aylsham War Memorial More images	Q66478042
8, 10 and 12, Church Terrace	II	8, 10 and 12, Church Terrace			1 June 1984	TG1920826970; 52°47′45″N 1°15′00″E		1169167	Upload Photo	Q26462373
Stable Block, Coach House and Boundary Walls	II	Coach House And Boundary Walls, Rawlinson's Lane			1 June 1984	TG1911027265; 52°47′54″N 1°14′55″E		1372631	Upload Photo	Q26653729
Parmeter's and Clyde Cottage	II	14, Cromer Road			1 June 1984	TG1935527180; 52°47′51″N 1°15′08″E		1050839	Upload Photo	Q26302774
Beech House	II	16, Cromer Road			1 June 1984	TG1935227194; 52°47′52″N 1°15′08″E		1169195	Upload Photo	Q26462398
Bushey Place	II	37, Cromer Road			1 June 1984	TG1926727450; 52°48′00″N 1°15′04″E		1306610	Upload Photo	Q26593376
Church Hill House	II	Cromer Road			1 June 1984	TG1932227047; 52°47′47″N 1°15′06″E		1373010	Upload Photo	Q26654040
Former Cottages to the East of Church Hill House	II	Cromer Road			1 June 1984	TG1932827044; 52°47′47″N 1°15′07″E		1169225	Upload Photo	Q26462429
The Old Vicarage	II	Cromer Road			1 June 1984	TG1927627105; 52°47′49″N 1°15′04″E		1050840	Upload Photo	Q26302775
Whitehouse and Whitehouse Cottage	II	Cromer Road			1 June 1984	TG1931327293; 52°47′55″N 1°15′06″E		1050842	Upload Photo	Q26302777
Abbots Hall	II	Drabblegate			1 June 1984	TG2017628455; 52°48′31″N 1°15′55″E		1050843	Upload Photo	Q26302778
Abbots Hall Farmhouse	II	Drabblegate			19 January 1952	TG2009528644; 52°48′37″N 1°15′51″E		1050844	Upload Photo	Q26302779
Barn 75m South West of Abbots Hall	II	Drabblegate			1 June 1984	TG2009628434; 52°48′31″N 1°15′51″E		1169309	Upload Photo	Q26462504
6, Dykesloke	II	6, Dykesloke			1 June 1984	TG1921326941; 52°47′44″N 1°15′00″E		1050845	Upload Photo	Q26302780
The Grange (including Front Boundary Wall, Gate Piers, Gates and Railings)	II	Gate Piers, Gates And Railings), Cromer Road			1 June 1984	TG1930427235; 52°47′53″N 1°15′06″E		1169246	Upload Photo	Q26462448
Crossways (including Front Boundary Wall, Gates, Gateposts and Railings)	II	Gates, Gateposts And Railings), 15 and 17, Cromer Road			1 June 1984	TG1931027267; 52°47′54″N 1°15′06″E		1050841	Upload Photo	Q26302776
Manor Farmhouse	II	Heydon Road			19 January 1952	TG1841627055; 52°47′49″N 1°14′18″E		1169342	Upload Photo	Q26462537
The Dell Farmhouse	II	Heydon Road			1 June 1984	TG1859027194; 52°47′53″N 1°14′28″E		1050846	Upload Photo	Q26302781
The Beeches	II	54, Holman Road			1 June 1984	TG1879326931; 52°47′44″N 1°14′38″E		1050847	Upload Photo	Q26302782
9 and 11, Hungate Street	II	9 and 11, Hungate Street			1 June 1984	TG1926926826; 52°47′40″N 1°15′03″E		1373013	Upload Photo	Q26654043
12, Hungate Street	II	12, Hungate Street			1 June 1984	TG1925526818; 52°47′40″N 1°15′02″E		1050848	Upload Photo	Q26302783
14, Hungate Street	II	14, Hungate Street			1 June 1984	TG1925426810; 52°47′39″N 1°15′02″E		1306579	Upload Photo	Q26593345
15, Hungate Street	II	15, Hungate Street			1 June 1984	TG1926326796; 52°47′39″N 1°15′02″E		1372638	Upload Photo	Q26653736
16 and 18, Hungate Street	II	16 and 18, Hungate Street			1 June 1984	TG1925326801; 52°47′39″N 1°15′02″E		1373011	Upload Photo	Q26654041
19, Hungate Street	II	19, Hungate Street			1 June 1984	TG1925926783; 52°47′39″N 1°15′02″E		1051573	Upload Photo	Q26303426
21, Hungate Street	II	21, Hungate Street			1 June 1984	TG1925726773; 52°47′38″N 1°15′02″E		1372639	Upload Photo	Q26653737
23 and 29, Hungate Street	II	23 and 29, Hungate Street			1 June 1984	TG1927326754; 52°47′38″N 1°15′03″E		1051574	Upload Photo	Q26303427
24 and 28, Hungate Street	II	24 and 28, Hungate Street			1 June 1984	TG1922126803; 52°47′39″N 1°15′00″E		1169443	Upload Photo	Q26462635
30, Hungate Street	II	30, Hungate Street			1 June 1984	TG1925126788; 52°47′39″N 1°15′02″E		1050849	Upload Photo	Q26302784
32 and 34, Hungate Street	II	32 and 34, Hungate Street			1 June 1984	TG1924826778; 52°47′38″N 1°15′02″E		1306543	Upload Photo	Q26593312
33, Hungate Street	II	33, Hungate Street			1 June 1984	TG1924926753; 52°47′38″N 1°15′02″E		1051575	Upload Photo	Q26303428
35, Hungate Street	II	35, Hungate Street			1 June 1984	TG1924926746; 52°47′37″N 1°15′02″E		1372640	Upload Photo	Q26653738
36, Hungate Street	II	36, Hungate Street			1 June 1984	TG1924426772; 52°47′38″N 1°15′01″E		1373012	Upload Photo	Q26654042
37, 39 and 43, Hungate Street	II	37, 39 and 43, Hungate Street			1 June 1984	TG1924526738; 52°47′37″N 1°15′01″E		1051576	Upload Photo	Q26303429
The Retreat	II	38 and 40, Hungate Street			1 June 1984	TG1920926779; 52°47′38″N 1°15′00″E		1050850	Upload Photo	Q26302785
46 and 48, Hungate Street	II	46 and 48, Hungate Street			1 June 1984	TG1922126769; 52°47′38″N 1°15′00″E		1169462	Upload Photo	Q26462654
47, Hungate Street	II	47, Hungate Street			1 June 1984	TG1924226724; 52°47′37″N 1°15′01″E		1372641	Upload Photo	Q26653739
50, Hungate Street	II	50, Hungate Street			1 June 1984	TG1923226759; 52°47′38″N 1°15′01″E		1050851	Upload Photo	Q26302786
Gothic House	II	51, Hungate Street			1 June 1984	TG1924226711; 52°47′36″N 1°15′01″E		1051577	Upload Photo	Q26303430
Collegiate House	II	64, Hungate Street			19 January 1952	TG1922126687; 52°47′35″N 1°15′00″E		1169476	Upload Photo	Q26462668
The Unicorn Public House	II	Hungate Street	pub		1 June 1984	TG1924426843; 52°47′40″N 1°15′02″E		1306574	The Unicorn Public House More images	Q26593340
Hill House, Including Boundary Wall on South and West Sides	II	Including Boundary Wall On South And West Sides, Heydon Road			1 June 1984	TG1893127094; 52°47′49″N 1°14′45″E		1306599	Upload Photo	Q26593365
8 and 9, Market Place	II	8 and 9, Market Place			1 June 1984	TG1926826909; 52°47′43″N 1°15′03″E		1051578	Upload Photo	Q26303431
10, Market Place	II	10, Market Place			1 June 1984	TG1926826916; 52°47′43″N 1°15′03″E		1169627	Upload Photo	Q26462807
11, Market Place	II	11, Market Place			1 June 1984	TG1926826921; 52°47′43″N 1°15′03″E		1051579	Upload Photo	Q26303432
12 and 13, Market Place	II	12 and 13, Market Place			1 June 1984	TG1926826930; 52°47′43″N 1°15′03″E		1169655	Upload Photo	Q26462834
14, Market Place	II	14, Market Place			1 June 1984	TG1926726940; 52°47′44″N 1°15′03″E		1372643	Upload Photo	Q26653741
15, Market Place	II	15, Market Place			1 June 1984	TG1926826949; 52°47′44″N 1°15′03″E		1169673	Upload Photo	Q26462852
Top Spot Restaurant	II	16, Market Place			1 June 1984	TG1926726960; 52°47′44″N 1°15′03″E		1051580	Upload Photo	Q26303433
No 17 Including Forecourt Wall and Railings	II	17, Market Place			1 June 1984	TG1926226972; 52°47′45″N 1°15′03″E		1372644	Upload Photo	Q26653742
18, Market Place	II	18, Market Place			1 June 1984	TG1928026969; 52°47′45″N 1°15′04″E		1306393	Upload Photo	Q26593179
International Stores	II	21, Market Place			1 June 1984	TG1928226946; 52°47′44″N 1°15′04″E		1051581	Upload Photo	Q26303434
30, Market Place	II	30, Market Place			10 May 1961	TG1932726918; 52°47′43″N 1°15′06″E		1051582	Upload Photo	Q26303435
31, Market Place	II	31, Market Place			1 June 1984	TG1932126909; 52°47′43″N 1°15′06″E		1306372	Upload Photo	Q26593159
32, Market Place	II	32, Market Place			1 June 1984	TG1931826903; 52°47′42″N 1°15′06″E		1372645	Upload Photo	Q26653743
33, Market Place	II	33, Market Place			1 June 1984	TG1931826896; 52°47′42″N 1°15′06″E		1169782	Upload Photo	Q26462958
Barclay's Bank (facade Only)	II	Market Place			19 January 1952	TG1930726880; 52°47′42″N 1°15′05″E		1372642	Upload Photo	Q26653740
Black Boys Hotel	II	Market Place	hotel		19 January 1952	TG1926826897; 52°47′42″N 1°15′03″E		1306480	Black Boys Hotel More images	Q26593256
Parish Church of Saint Michael Including Church Yard Boundary Wall	I	Market Place	church building		10 May 1961	TG1926227008; 52°47′46″N 1°15′03″E		1051583	Parish Church of Saint Michael Including Church Yard Boundary Wall More images	Q17535710
Town Hall	II	Market Place	city hall		1 June 1984	TG1931326934; 52°47′43″N 1°15′05″E		1306405	Town Hall More images	Q26593190
1-8, Mashes Row	II	1-8, Mashes Row			1 June 1984	TG1974527658; 52°48′06″N 1°15′30″E		1169889	Upload Photo	Q26463069
6, Mill Row	II	6, Mill Row			1 June 1984	TG1969227417; 52°47′58″N 1°15′27″E		1170074	Upload Photo	Q26463347
30, Mill Row	II	30, Mill Row			1 June 1984	TG1976427428; 52°47′59″N 1°15′31″E		1170133	Upload Photo	Q26463463
Nos 32, 34 and Granary Building to East	II	34 And Granary Building To East, Mill Row			1 June 1984	TG1979027422; 52°47′58″N 1°15′32″E		1051593	Upload Photo	Q26303445
Millgate House	II	Mill Row			1 June 1984	TG1977227425; 52°47′59″N 1°15′31″E		1306220	Upload Photo	Q26593020
The Belt	II	Mill Row			1 June 1984	TG1987527391; 52°47′57″N 1°15′37″E		1051594	Upload Photo	Q26303446
Water Mill	II	Mill Row	mill		20 October 1969	TG1979527449; 52°47′59″N 1°15′32″E		1051592	Water Mill More images	Q26303444
2,4 and 6, Millgate	II	2, 4 and 6, Millgate			1 June 1984	TG1963927236; 52°47′53″N 1°15′24″E		1372646	Upload Photo	Q26653744
3 and 5, Millgate	II	3 and 5, Millgate			1 June 1984	TG1961427332; 52°47′56″N 1°15′22″E		1170003	Upload Photo	Q26463246
8-12, Millgate	II	8-12, Millgate			1 June 1984	TG1963727259; 52°47′53″N 1°15′24″E		1051584	Upload Photo	Q26303436
9, Millgate	II	9, Millgate			1 June 1984	TG1962127354; 52°47′56″N 1°15′23″E		1051587	Upload Photo	Q26303439
11, Millgate	II	11, Millgate			1 June 1984	TG1962727367; 52°47′57″N 1°15′23″E		1170010	Upload Photo	Q26463257
14, 16 and 18, Millgate	II	14, 16 and 18, Millgate			1 June 1984	TG1963727266; 52°47′54″N 1°15′24″E		1169907	Upload Photo	Q26463092
15 and 17, Millgate	II	15 and 17, Millgate			1 June 1984	TG1965427398; 52°47′58″N 1°15′25″E		1051588	Upload Photo	Q26303440
20, Millgate	II	20, Millgate			1 June 1984	TG1964127284; 52°47′54″N 1°15′24″E		1051585	Upload Photo	Q26303437
Millgate Stores	II	22, 24, And 26, Millgate			1 June 1984	TG1964827300; 52°47′55″N 1°15′24″E		1306288	Upload Photo	Q26593082
28, 30, 32 and 34, Millgate	II	28, 30, 32 and 34, Millgate			1 June 1984	TG1964327312; 52°47′55″N 1°15′24″E		1372647	Upload Photo	Q26653745
36 and 38, Millgate	II	36 and 38, Millgate			1 June 1984	TG1966927337; 52°47′56″N 1°15′25″E		1169953	Upload Photo	Q26463168
Bridge 22 Metres North of Bridge House	II	Millgate			1 June 1984	TG1971227530; 52°48′02″N 1°15′28″E		1170046	Upload Photo	Q26463315
Bridge 60 Metres North of Bridge House	II	Millgate			1 June 1984	TG1974227561; 52°48′03″N 1°15′30″E		1051591	Upload Photo	Q26303443
Bridge House	II	Millgate			1 June 1984	TG1969127510; 52°48′01″N 1°15′27″E		1051590	Upload Photo	Q26303442
Bure House	II	Millgate			19 January 1952	TG1968327440; 52°47′59″N 1°15′26″E		1051586	Upload Photo	Q26303438
The Maltings	II	Millgate			1 June 1984	TG1964027426; 52°47′59″N 1°15′24″E		1170020	Upload Photo	Q26463269
1, Norwich Road	II	1, Norwich Road			19 January 1952	TG1935626844; 52°47′40″N 1°15′08″E		1372648	Upload Photo	Q26653746
Old Bank House	II*	3, Norwich Road			10 May 1965	TG1936226831; 52°47′40″N 1°15′08″E		1051551	Upload Photo	Q17554053
The Orchards	II	20, Norwich Road			30 October 1995	TG1937026732; 52°47′37″N 1°15′08″E		1249156	Upload Photo	Q26541318
The Manor House	II*	Norwich Road			19 January 1952	TG1942026751; 52°47′37″N 1°15′11″E		1372668	Upload Photo	Q17554256
Workshop (also That Part Included in No.25)	II	23, Oakfield Road			18 August 2003	TG1948526863; 52°47′41″N 1°15′14″E		1390578	Upload Photo	Q26669968
27, Oakfield Road	II	27, Oakfield Road			1 June 1984	TG1948326851; 52°47′40″N 1°15′14″E		1051552	Upload Photo	Q26303406
Pryde House	II	29, Oakfield Road			1 June 1984	TG1948426842; 52°47′40″N 1°15′14″E		1372669	Upload Photo	Q26653763
1, Penfold Street	II	1, Penfold Street			1 June 1984	TG1921826889; 52°47′42″N 1°15′00″E		1051553	Upload Photo	Q26303407
21, 23, 25 and 27, Penfold Street	II	21, 23, 25 and 27, Penfold Street			1 June 1984	TG1916426890; 52°47′42″N 1°14′57″E		1051554	Upload Photo	Q26303408
Peterson's House	II	Petersons Lane			1 June 1984	TG1917627330; 52°47′56″N 1°14′59″E		1372670	Upload Photo	Q26653764
Norfolk House Including Forecourt Wall, Railings and Gates	II	Railings And Gates, 13, Hungate Street			1 June 1984	TG1927226808; 52°47′39″N 1°15′03″E		1169489	Upload Photo	Q26462681
No 32 Including Boundary Wall, Railings and Gates	II	Railings And Gates, 32, White Hart Street			1 June 1984	TG1945126995; 52°47′45″N 1°15′13″E		1372658	Upload Photo	Q26653755
West Lodge	II	Rawlinson's Lane			1 June 1984	TG1902927243; 52°47′54″N 1°14′51″E		1051555	Upload Photo	Q26303409
1, Red Lion Street	II	1, Red Lion Street			1 June 1984	TG1932526888; 52°47′42″N 1°15′06″E		1051561	Upload Photo	Q26303415
2 and 4, Red Lion Street	II	2 and 4, Red Lion Street			1 June 1984	TG1934126885; 52°47′42″N 1°15′07″E		1051556	Upload Photo	Q26303410
3 and 5, Red Lion Street	II	3 and 5, Red Lion Street			1 June 1984	TG1933226895; 52°47′42″N 1°15′06″E		1372635	Upload Photo	Q26653733
6, Red Lion Street	II	6, Red Lion Street			1 June 1984	TG1934326893; 52°47′42″N 1°15′07″E		1051557	Upload Photo	Q26303411
7, Red Lion Street	II	7, Red Lion Street			1 June 1984	TG1933326904; 52°47′42″N 1°15′06″E		1170331	Upload Photo	Q26463718
15, Red Lion Street	II	15, Red Lion Street			1 June 1984	TG1933926951; 52°47′44″N 1°15′07″E		1051562	Upload Photo	Q26303416
16, Red Lion Street	II	16, Red Lion Street			1 June 1984	TG1935326926; 52°47′43″N 1°15′08″E		1170244	Upload Photo	Q26463572
17, Red Lion Street	II	17, Red Lion Street			1 June 1984	TG1934026960; 52°47′44″N 1°15′07″E		1170343	Upload Photo	Q26463743
18, Red Lion Street	II	18, Red Lion Street			1 June 1984	TG1935626936; 52°47′43″N 1°15′08″E		1372632	Upload Photo	Q26653730
19, Red Lion Street	II	19, Red Lion Street			1 June 1984	TG1934226968; 52°47′44″N 1°15′07″E		1051563	Upload Photo	Q26303417
20 and 22, Red Lion Street	II	20 and 22, Red Lion Street			1 June 1984	TG1935426948; 52°47′44″N 1°15′08″E		1170262	Upload Photo	Q26463586
21 and 21a, Red Lion Street	II	21 and 21a, Red Lion Street			1 June 1984	TG1934426971; 52°47′44″N 1°15′07″E		1306103	Upload Photo	Q26592911
23 and 27, Red Lion Street	II	23 and 27, Red Lion Street			1 June 1984	TG1934526983; 52°47′45″N 1°15′07″E		1372636	Upload Photo	Q26653734
25, Red Lion Street	II	25, Red Lion Street			1 June 1984	TG1932926984; 52°47′45″N 1°15′06″E		1051564	Upload Photo	Q26303418
28 and 30, Red Lion Street	II	28 and 30, Red Lion Street			1 June 1984	TG1935726972; 52°47′44″N 1°15′08″E		1051558	Upload Photo	Q26303412
29, Red Lion Street	II	29, Red Lion Street			1 June 1984	TG1934326997; 52°47′45″N 1°15′07″E		1170363	Upload Photo	Q26463786
31, Red Lion Street	II	31, Red Lion Street			1 June 1984	TG1934327011; 52°47′46″N 1°15′07″E		1051565	Upload Photo	Q26303419
32, Red Lion Street	II	32, Red Lion Street			1 June 1984	TG1935726981; 52°47′45″N 1°15′08″E		1372633	Upload Photo	Q26653731
33, Red Lion Street	II	33, Red Lion Street			1 June 1984	TG1934227024; 52°47′46″N 1°15′07″E		1051566	Upload Photo	Q26303420
34 and 36, Red Lion Street	II	34 and 36, Red Lion Street			1 June 1984	TG1935726990; 52°47′45″N 1°15′08″E		1170278	Upload Photo	Q26463609
35, Red Lion Street	II	35, Red Lion Street			1 June 1984	TG1934127031; 52°47′46″N 1°15′07″E		1170388	Upload Photo	Q26463833
38, Red Lion Street	II	38, Red Lion Street			1 June 1984	TG1935727000; 52°47′45″N 1°15′08″E		1051559	Upload Photo	Q26303413
44, Red Lion Street	II	44, Red Lion Street, NR11 6ER			1 June 1984	TG1935627009; 52°47′46″N 1°15′08″E		1170288	Upload Photo	Q26463627
46, Red Lion Street	II	46, Red Lion Street, NR11 6ER			1 June 1984	TG1935527013; 52°47′46″N 1°15′08″E		1051560	Upload Photo	Q26303414
50, Red Lion Street	II	50, Red Lion Street			1 June 1984	TG1935527019; 52°47′46″N 1°15′08″E		1170292	Upload Photo	Q26463632
52 and 54, Red Lion Street	II	52 and 54, Red Lion Street			1 June 1984	TG1935427025; 52°47′46″N 1°15′08″E		1372634	Upload Photo	Q26653732
56 and 56a, Red Lion Street	II	56 and 56a, Red Lion Street			1 June 1984	TG1935727036; 52°47′47″N 1°15′08″E		1170306	Upload Photo	Q26463662
31a, Red Lion Street	II	31a, Red Lion Street			1 June 1984	TG1934327019; 52°47′46″N 1°15′07″E		1170384	Upload Photo	Q26463827
Knoll House	II*	School House Lane			19 January 1952	TG1915227026; 52°47′47″N 1°14′57″E		1051567	Upload Photo	Q17554059
Yew Tree House Including Boundary Wall	II*	School House Lane			1 June 1984	TG1917627017; 52°47′46″N 1°14′58″E		1170402	Upload Photo	Q17554137
The Belt Lodge	II	Sir William's Lane			1 June 1984	TG1963227112; 52°47′49″N 1°15′23″E		1051568	Upload Photo	Q26303421
Spa Farm House	II	Spa Lane			1 June 1984	TG1918525540; 52°46′58″N 1°14′55″E		1051569	Upload Photo	Q26303422
Cottage Immediately North of Spratts Green House	II	Spratts Green			1 June 1984	TG2092025865; 52°47′06″N 1°16′29″E		1170438	Upload Photo	Q26463932
Spratts Green Farmhouse and Barns	II	Spratts Green			1 June 1984	TG2087725463; 52°46′54″N 1°16′25″E		1170412	Upload Photo	Q26463882
Spratts Green House	II	Spratts Green			1 June 1984	TG2091425850; 52°47′06″N 1°16′28″E		1051570	Upload Photo	Q26303423
Stonegate Farm House	II	Stonegate			1 June 1984	TG1821225436; 52°46′57″N 1°14′03″E		1372637	Upload Photo	Q26653735
Former Barn Immediately South of Maltings	II	The Maltings, NR11 6GX			1 June 1984	TG1961527426; 52°47′59″N 1°15′23″E		1051589	Upload Photo	Q26303441
Barn North East of Coldham Hall	II	Tuttington Road			1 June 1984	TG2114127920; 52°48′12″N 1°16′45″E		1051571	Upload Photo	Q26303424
Coldham Hall	II	Tuttington Road			19 January 1952	TG2111227872; 52°48′11″N 1°16′44″E		1170440	Upload Photo	Q26463934
Bayfield House	II	1, White Hart Street			19 January 1952	TG1934927060; 52°47′47″N 1°15′08″E		1051530	Upload Photo	Q26303385
3, White Hart Street	II	3, White Hart Street			1 June 1984	TG1936027061; 52°47′47″N 1°15′08″E		1051531	Upload Photo	Q26303386
4, White Hart Street	II	4, White Hart Street			1 June 1984	TG1937527045; 52°47′47″N 1°15′09″E		1306085	Upload Photo	Q26592895
5 and 7, White Hart Street	II	5 and 7, White Hart Street			1 June 1984	TG1936827066; 52°47′48″N 1°15′09″E		1372659	Upload Photo	Q26653756
15, White Hart Street	II	15, White Hart Street			19 January 1952	TG1941127057; 52°47′47″N 1°15′11″E		1372660	Upload Photo	Q26653757
17, White Hart Street	II	17, White Hart Street			19 January 1952	TG1941827053; 52°47′47″N 1°15′11″E		1051533	Upload Photo	Q26303388
19, White Hart Street	II	19, White Hart Street			19 January 1952	TG1942827049; 52°47′47″N 1°15′12″E		1306046	Upload Photo	Q26592859
24, White Hart Street	II	24, White Hart Street			1 June 1984	TG1942827036; 52°47′46″N 1°15′12″E		1170463	Upload Photo	Q26463987
25, White Hart Street	II	25, White Hart Street			25 August 1976	TG1947327042; 52°47′47″N 1°15′14″E		1051534	Upload Photo	Q26303389
Nos 26, 28 and Methodist Chapel	II	28 And Methodist Chapel, White Hart Street			1 June 1984	TG1943827027; 52°47′46″N 1°15′12″E		1051529	Upload Photo	Q26303384
Baptist Chapel	II	White Hart Street			1 June 1984	TG1941026981; 52°47′45″N 1°15′11″E		1051572	Upload Photo	Q26303425
Numbers 9 and 11 and Barn	II	White Hart Street			1 June 1984	TG1938627079; 52°47′48″N 1°15′10″E		1051532	Upload Photo	Q26303387

== See also ==
- Grade I listed buildings in Norfolk
- Grade II* listed buildings in Norfolk

== Sources ==
- Wilson, Bill; Pevsner, Nikolaus (1999) [1962], Norfolk 2: North-West and South, The Buildings of England, New Haven and London: Yale University Press, ISBN 978-0-300-09657-6
