= Heydon, Norfolk =

Village in Norfolk, England

Coordinates: 52.802°N 1.134°E

Heydon
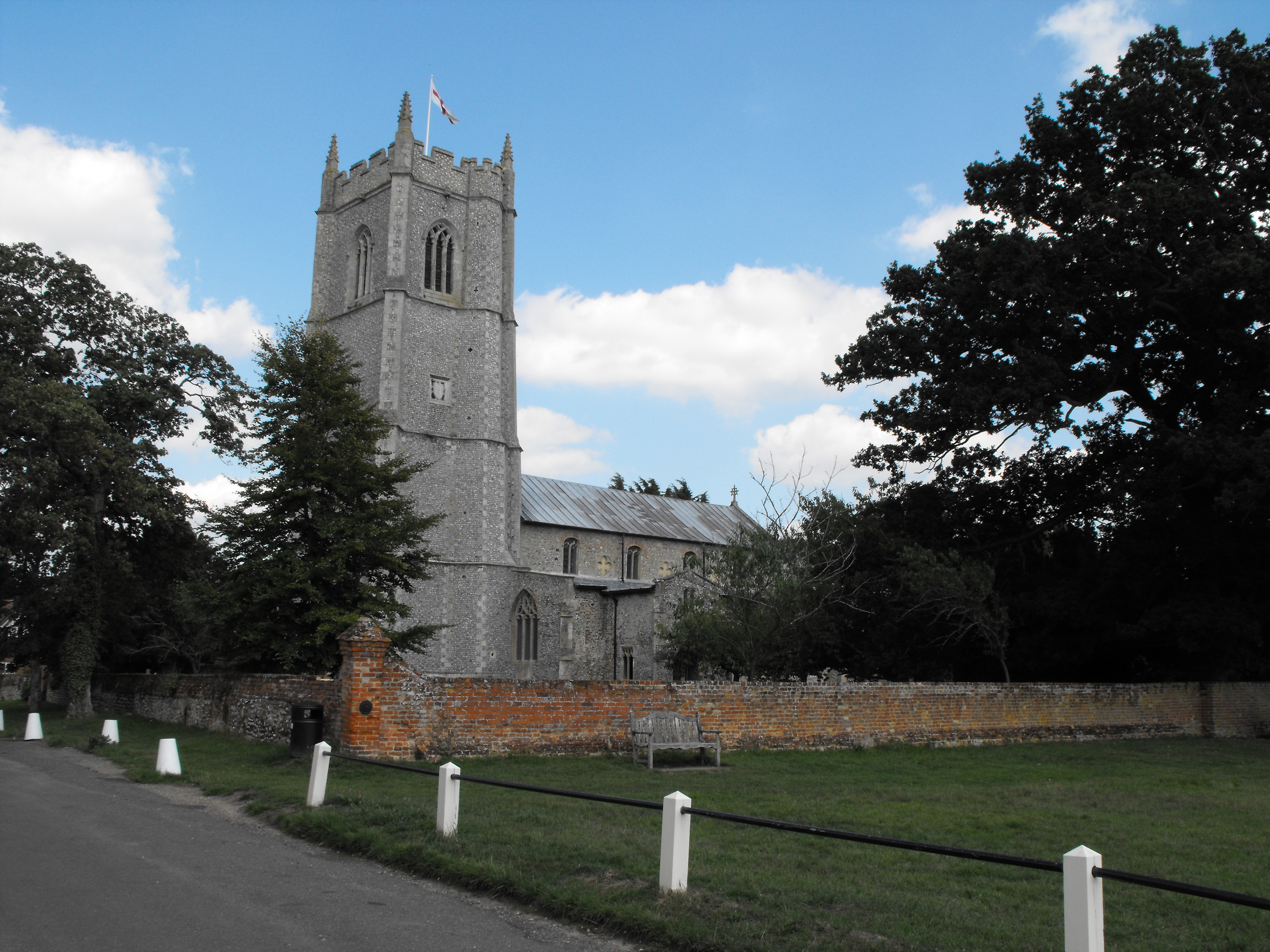
- St Peter and St Paul's church

- Location within Norfolk
- Area: 8.02 km^{2} (3.10 sq mi)
- Population: 89 (2001 census)
  - Density: 11/km^{2} (28/sq mi)
- OS grid reference: TG113273
- Civil parish: Heydon
- District: Broadland
- Shire county: Norfolk
- Region: East
- Country: England
- Sovereign state: United Kingdom
- Post town: NORWICH
- Postcode district: NR11
- Dialling code: 01263
- Police: Norfolk
- Fire: Norfolk
- Ambulance: East of England
- UK Parliament: Broadland and Fakenham

Heydon is a village and civil parish in Norfolk, England.

It is located 3 miles (4.8 km) north of the market town of Reepham. The village can be accessed by the public only from the south, resulting in the only road, called The Street, effectively being a cul-de-sac for general traffic. At its centre is a green, surrounded by the parish church and traditional English rural buildings.

The village is privately owned, by the Bulwer family.

== History ==
=== Medieval ===
The village is not referred to in the Domesday Book of 1086, and it is considered that it was at that time part of the manor of Stinton, a settlement long since depopulated, located in the neighbouring parish of Salle.

The name is believed to derive from "high down" or similarly "plain on the hill". It is written in 1196 as Heidon.

A market charter was granted in 1311.

The 14th/15th century Church of St Peter and St Paul is a grade I listed building and contains some notable wall paintings, rediscovered in 1970.

=== Heydon Hall ===
Erasmus Earle, one of the most noted lawyers of his time, was lord of the manor in the early 17th century. The 19th century lord was William Earle Lytton Bulwer (1799–1877), elder brother of the author Edward Bulwer Lytton. The village is still owned by the Bulwer Long family, one of only around a dozen English villages that are entirely privately owned. The Elizabethan Heydon Hall, built in 1582 by Henry Dynne and extended in the late 18th and early 19th century, is at the head of the estate and is located just northeast of the village within the private Heydon Park.

Heydon Hall, a Grade I listed building, completed in 1584, was modified in the mid 1700s and restored in the late 1900s. As of 2021, it is the home of Rhona Bulwer Long and her family, who allow tourists to walk the grounds; the Estate Office occasionally agrees to open the Hall for filming and special events.

=== 18th and 19th centuries ===
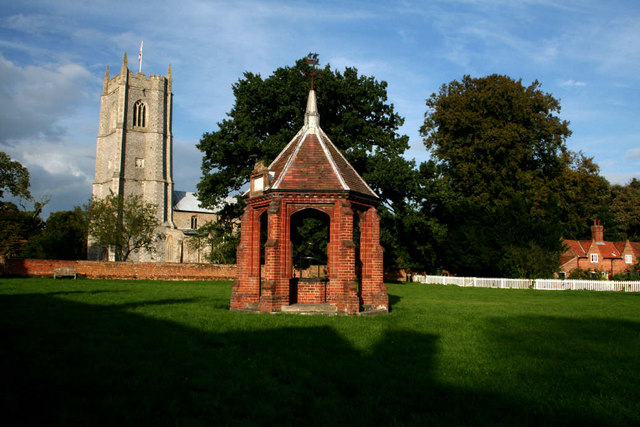
The green, church and well house

By the village green there is an 18th-century public house – The Earle Arms – which is grade II listed and has a "Regionally Important Historic Interior". It was until circa 1845 called the Lion and Lamb. It is believed that a pub has existed at this location since the 16th century, and was a coaching inn. The front elevation of the building features a wood sculpture of Mary Read, an 18th-century pirate, believed to originate from that century.

There was a common, located to the northwest of the village, until enclosed into Heydon Park by the mid-19th century. The early 19th-century expansion of the Park also resulted in the closure to the public of the through-road, shown on the Tithe map (c. 1836–50) that ran from the northwest at Corpusty Road, along/through the common, passing the parish church and Earle Arms coaching inn (along a stretch that remains a highway), then across/around the village green and then passing Heydon Grange and Park Farm to the southeast at Dog Corner; resulting in the village since being only accessible by public highway via the one road from the south.

The village had a school, built 1840-2 and closed in 1962; located on The Street, it has been converted to housing.

The area was served by the Bluestone railway station from 1883 to 1916; the line, now dismantled, ran through the northeast edge of the parish, roughly parallel to the B1149 road. Other nearby stations were at Cawston (closed 1952) and Corpusty (closed 1959). Also in 1883, the church acquired an organ, built by Wordsworth and Maskell, of Leeds, and donated by General Edward Bulwer in memory of his wife. Unusually for this period of English organ-building, the organ has a reversed console, in which the organist faces out into the church. It was restored in 2021-2022.

The village retains an old-fashioned character with no new buildings having been added since the well house commemorating the Golden Jubilee of Queen Victoria was built in 1887. The Jubilee Memorial Well House is an example of Tudor Revival architecture and is grade II listed.

The population of the parish of Heydon increased from 296 in 1801 to a recorded peak of 350 in 1831. With the reduction in agricultural labour, and the draw of the working class to urban areas in Britain's industrial revolution, the population then fell to 205 in 1891.

=== 20th and 21st centuries ===
After a few decades (1890s-1930s) of a stable population in the low 200s, the population declined again in the mid- and late-20th century to just 89 in 2001. No parish-specific figure is available for the 2011 census, however the population is estimated in the 2010s to be around 100; barns to the rear of Cropton Hall were converted to houses in the late 2010s.

Heydon became Norfolk's first conservation area in 1971, having won the county's Best Kept Village in 1967 and 1968. This conservation area covers the village, and in 1991 a further conservation area was designated which covers the wider landscape setting to the village, including a part of the neighbouring parish of Salle.

The Parish Room is a World War I soldiers' accommodation hut which was re-sited to the village in 1922; it serves as the village hall and was restored in 2013.

The village's blacksmith workshop closed in 2007.

Since 1756, the village has been owned by the Bulwer family. As of 2021, Heydon has a population of about a hundred; businesses included "a pub, a tea room, bakery, floral design and artisan store, antiques shop, interiors and clothing studio, a beauty barn and hairdressers". Heydon contains 45 cottages and houses which are rented to tenants.

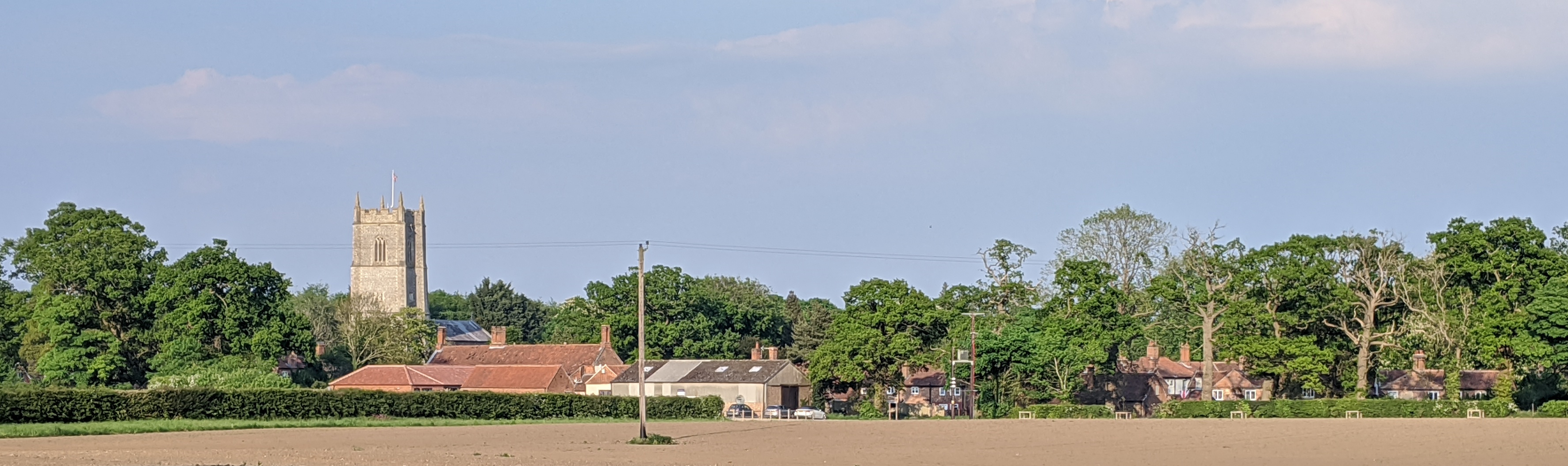
The village in 2020, with the car park and commercial area at the left-foreground, formerly Church Farm

== Filming location ==
Heydon has on several occasions been used in television and film productions. The village was used as the setting for the Anglia Television soap opera Weaver's Green. Films partly shot in the village or at the Hall include The Go Between (1970), Riders (1993), Hitler's Britain (2002), Vanity Fair, The Woman in White, The Moonstone (1996), The Peppermint Pig, and A Cock and Bull Story (2005). A Monty Python's Flying Circus sketch about village idiots was filmed here, using several locations in the village including the former school. In 1984 an episode of the television series The Comic Strip ("Susie", series 2, episode 3) was filmed in the village, on the agricultural estate, and at Heydon Hall. The Earle Arms was used as the "Winterman Arms" in the ITV sitcom Rising Up (1999).

== Geography ==
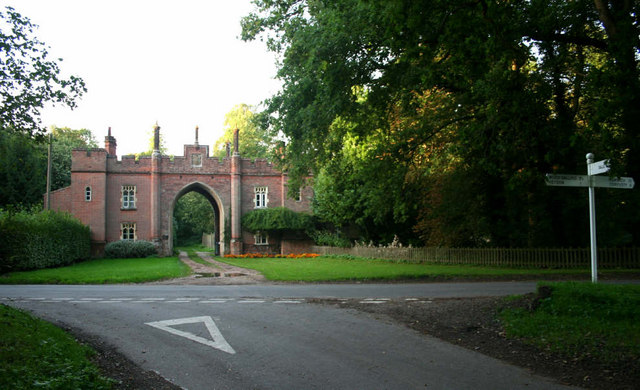
An entrance to Heydon Park, at Dog Corner, in the form of a gatehouse with lodges either side

The civil parish consists of the village together with Heydon Hall and its parkland, and several outlying farms and houses including the grade II* listed Cropton Hall, dating from 1702. The village is at an elevation of approximately 45 metres (148 ft) above sea level.

1.5 miles (2.4 km) to the south is the small village of Salle. The other neighbouring parishes are Thurning, Corpusty and Saxthorpe, Oulton, Cawston and Wood Dalling.

== Governance ==
Due to its small population, the parish has a parish meeting rather than a parish council.

The parish forms part of the ward of Eynesford, which elects a councillor on Broadland District Council. Although Eynesford is named after a hundred, Heydon formed part of the neighbouring hundred of South Erpingham.

== Amenities ==
As of 2020, at the centre of the village there is a traditional pub, a tea room, a bakery (operating from the former blacksmiths) and seven small retail/service businesses located in the buildings that have in recent years been converted from Church Farm. The village no longer has a post office or convenience shop. The church continues to be used for regular Christian worship and the parish room is in frequent use.

Annual public events, held on the green and attracting visitors from beyond the parish, are the tug of war competition in May and traditional Guy Fawkes Night (bonfire night) celebrations.

== Notable residents ==
- Erasmus Earle- (1590-1667) lawyer and politician, lived in Heydon.
- Roger Pepys MP- (1617-1688) lawyer and politician, born in Heydon.
- Edward Bulwer-Lytton- (1803-1873) writer and politician, grew-up in Heydon Hall.
- General Sir Edward Bulwer- (1829-1910) British Army officer and Lieutenant Governor of Guernsey, born in Heydon.
- Maj. Peter Beck CVO- (1909-2002) soldier and schoolmaster, retired to Heydon.
- Johnny Byrne- (1935-2008) Irish screenwriter, lived and died in Heydon.

== War Memorial ==
Heydon's war memorial is a wooden roll of honour inside the Church of St. Peter & St. Paul. The memorial lists the following names for the First World War:

Rank	Name	Unit	Date of death	Burial/Commemoration
Gnr.	Noel S. Cann (Note: Private Cann grew up in Heydon and moved from the village in 1898, enlisting in Cromer at the beginning of the war.)	94th Bde., Royal Field Artillery	4 Nov. 1918	St. Sever Cemetery
Pte.	Ambrose E. Cottrell	7th Bn., The Buffs	2 Oct. 1918	Vis-en-Artois Memorial
Pte.	Robert Owen	2nd (East Ontario) Bn., CEF	29 Jul. 1917	Maroc British Cemetery
Pte.	William R. Hipperson	1st Bn., Norfolk Regiment	5 May 1915	Menin Gate
Pte.	William J. Wright	10th Bn., Hampshire Regiment	10 Aug. 1915	Helles Memorial
Pte.	Arthur Owen	1st Bn., Norfolk Regt.	24 Aug. 1918	Bagneux British Cemetery
Pte.	J. Charles Baldwin	4th Bn., Norfolk Regt.	8 Sep. 1915	Helles Memorial
Pte.	Claude C. Grix (Note: Before the war, Private Grix worked as a farm labourer for his father before enlisting in Norwich.)	9th Bn., Norfolk Regt.	13 Feb. 1917	Loos Memorial
