= Thurning, Norfolk =

Village in Norfolk, England

Coordinates: 52.82337°N 1.08696°E

Thurning
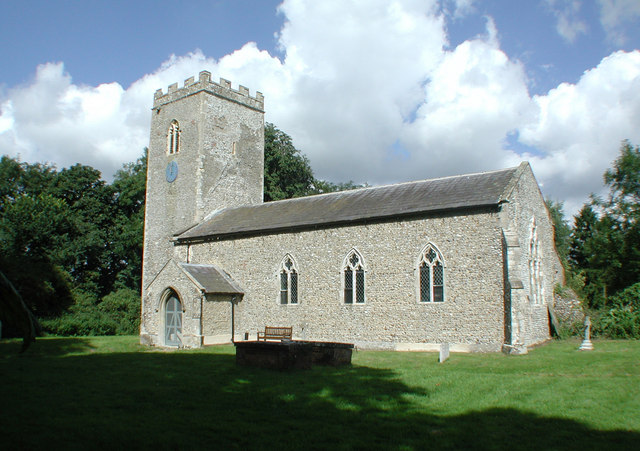
- St Andrew’s Church, Thurning

- Location within Norfolk
- Area: 6.47 km^{2} (2.50 sq mi)
- Population: 43 (2001 census)
  - Density: 7/km^{2} (18/sq mi)
- OS grid reference: TG080295
- Civil parish: Thurning
- District: North Norfolk
- Shire county: Norfolk
- Region: East
- Country: England
- Sovereign state: United Kingdom
- Post town: DEREHAM
- Postcode district: NR20
- Dialling code: 01263
- Police: Norfolk
- Fire: Norfolk
- Ambulance: East of England
- UK Parliament: Broadland and Fakenham

Thurning is a small dispersed village and civil parish in the English county of Norfolk and district of North Norfolk, near the border with Broadland. The population at the 2011 Census remained less than 100 and is recorded together with the neighbouring civil parish of Hindolveston.

== Location and description ==
Thurning lies near Corpusty, seven miles (11 km) south of Holt, and nine miles (14 km) north-west of Aylsham.

The parish has no substantial settlements and consists chiefly of farms and houses which are well spaced from each other. It includes the small hamlet of Craymere Beck.

The soil is mixed, the subsoil clay and sand.

In his Topographical Dictionary of England (1848), Samuel Lewis says:

THURNING (St. Andrew)... comprises 1584a. 1r. 19p., of which 1,200 acres (4.9 km^{2}) are arable, 300 pasture and meadow, and 80 plantation. The surface is agreeably undulated, and the high grounds command fine views of the picturesque scenery within and around the parish, which is remarkable for the number and variety of wild flowers with which its meadows are studded.

== History ==
At the time of the Domesday Book (1086), Thurning was recorded as 'Tyrninga', i.e. "Tyrnings" (pl.), signifying "the place of the followers or kin-group of Tyrn", typical of the earlier, immigration phase of Angle-Saxon settlements. Charles Parkin translates its findings from the Latin:

The principal lordship of this village was, at the survey, farmed of the Conqueror, or took care of by Godric his steward, Ulf, a Saxon, lord of it in the days of King Edward, being deprived, when one carucate of land and 6 villains, 9 borderers, and one servus belonged to it; there were 2 carucates in demean, one and a half among the tenants, with 10 acres (40,000 m^{2}) of meadow, &c., the moiety of a mill, 4 runci, 20 cows, &c., and 50 sheep; and 6 socmen had 16 acres (65,000 m^{2}) of land, and a carucate and a half. The soc belonged to the King's manor of Folsham; it was at that time valued at 60s. at the survey at 100s. quit-rent, and 10s. as a present, or free gift, was 5 furlongs long and 6 broad, and paid 5d. to the King's gelt.

In 1659, Peter Elwin of Thurning (1623–1695) married Anne Rolfe, the elder daughter of Thomas Rolfe, who was the son of John Rolfe and his wife Pocahontas. John Rolfe was originally from Heacham in Norfolk, and his granddaughter Anne was brought up there.

Parish registers survive only from the early 18th century. Registers deposited in the Norfolk Record Office are for baptisms (1707, 1715–2006), marriages (1717–1739, 1758–2004), burials (1716–2006) and banns (1758–1822). However, some Archdeacons' and Bishops' transcripts survive, copies of register entries for years as far back as 1600.

According to William White, a good new rectory was built in 1827. Samuel Lewis calls this "a handsome house erected in 1832".

Following the Poor Law Amendment Act 1834, Thurning became part of the Aylsham Union. The first workhouses were at Oulton and Buxton, both closed when a new workhouse opened at Aylsham in 1849.

William White's History, Gazetteer, and Directory of Norfolk (1835 edition) says of Thurning:

THURNING, or Thirning, is a parish of dispersed houses, 6 miles (9.7 km) S. of Holt, and 4½ miles N. of Reepham, with 140 inhabitants and about 1,500 acres (6.1 km^{2}) of land. W. E. L. Bulwer, Esq., is lord of the manor, (fine arbitrary.) A great part of the soil belongs to Hastings Elwyn, Esq., the owner of Thurning Hall, a neat mansion, with a fine lawn and small lake, and now the residence of James Gay, Esq. Mr. J. R. Barber, J. Richardson, Esq., and some others, have estates here. CRIMER'S BECK gives name to a hamlet on the north side of the parish. The CHURCH, dedicated to St. Andrew, has a nave, north aisle, and tower, with three bells, and had formerly a chancel. It was new roofed about ten years ago. The rectory, valued in K. B. at £7, is in the gift of Christ College, Cambridge, and incumbency of the Rev. Henry Wm. Blake, whose residence was rebuilt about four years ago. Directory - Thos. Frost, vict., Plough; James Gay, Esq.; Thos. Paul, shopkeeper; Hy. Pointin, blacksmith; Wm. Reynolds, miller; Samuel Rider, shoemaker; and Jas. Rech Barber, Richard Harvey, James Margarson, John Pye, John Sewell and Daniel Sidney, farmers.

In 1835, there were twelve parliamentary electors for the West Norfolk division in respect of Thurning, of whom four were outside the parish: Thomas Armes of Weybourne, Hastings Elwin, Esq., of Thorpe, Caleb Elwin, clerk, of Melton Constable, and Robert Fountain Elwin, clerk, of Norwich. The eight at Thurning itself were Henry Wm Blake, clerk, Rash James Barber, James Gay, Esq., of Thurning Hall, Richard Hervey, James Margarson, John Pye, Daniel Sidney, and John Sewell.

In 1836, Thomas Frost was the licensee of a public house called 'The Plough'.

In 1839, the Rector was awarded a yearly rent-charge of £370, in lieu of tithes.

William White's History, Gazetteer, and Directory of Norfolk (second edition, 1845) says of Thurning:

THURNING, or Thirning, is a parish of scattered houses, 6 miles (9.7 km) S. of Holt, and 4½ miles N. of Reepham, containing 166 souls and 1594 A. 1 R. 19 P. of land. W. E. L. Bulwer, Esq., is lord of the manor, but a great part of the soil belongs to Lord Hastings, J. Richardson, Esq., and James Gay, Esq. The latter is seated at the Hall, a neat mansion, with a fine lawn and small lake. CRIMES BECK gives name to a small hamlet, on the north side of the parish. The Church, St. Andrew, was new roofed about 18 years ago. The rectory, valued in K. B. at £7, has 18 acres (73,000 m^{2}) of glebe, a good residence, rebuilt in 1832, and a yearly rent of £370, awarded in 1839, in lieu of tithes. The patronage is in Christ College, Cambridge, and the Rev. Henry Wm. Blake is the incumbent. The other residents are, Maria Eke, shopkeeper; James Gay, Esq., Hall; Henry Pointin, blacksmith; Wm. Reynolds, miller; Samuel Rider, shopkeeper; and Jas. Rash Barber, James Bidwell, Daniel Fransham, Wm. Laskey, John Pye, and Wm. Rix, farmers.

Benjamin Clarke's British Gazetteer (1852) says:

THURNING, NORFOLK, a parish in Eynesford hund., union of Aylsham: 139 miles (224 km) from London (coach road 124), 5 from Briningham, 8 from Aylsham. Nor. and East Co. Rail. through Ely and Dereham to Elmham station, thence 8 miles (13 km): from Derby, through Syston, Peterborough, &c., 160 miles (260 km). Money orders issued at East Dereham: London letters delivd. 9½ a.m. Post closes 2½ p.m. The living, a dischd. rectory in the archdy. of Norfolk and diocese of Norwich, is valued at £7: pres. net income, £355: patron, Corpus Christi College, Cambridge: pres. incumbent, H. W. Blake, 1824: contains 1,650 acres (6.7 km^{2}): 18 houses: popn. in 1841, 166: assd. propy. £1,581: poor rates in 1848, £189, 13 s. The Hall, a pleasing mansion, is the seat of James Gay, Esq., the representative of an ancient family which originally came from Normandy and were settled early in the time of Elizabeth at Matlask and Thurgarton, in which and the adjoining parishes they possessed considerable landed estates. Mr. Gay of Thurning, who is the second son of the late John Gay, Esq., settled at Thurning: and having been under-secretary of Ceylon, and commissioner for the Kandian provinces, is now a magistrate and deputy lieutenant for the county.

In 1883, the chief crops were wheat, roots, barley and hay. Lieutenant-Colonel W. E. G. L. Bulwer was the lord of the manor. The principal residents were listed as Jas. Gay Esq. J.P., Thurning hall, Rev. John Fenwick, B.D., J.P., rector, Robert Brownsell, William Brownsell, Frederick Faircloth, Henry Hall, and Alfred Clark of Wood Dalling, farmers, George Burton, gamekeeper, William Harvey, farm bailiff, and Edwd. Poynton of Cray mere, blacksmith.

At the census of 1891, the following surnames are recorded in the parish: Adams, Aldis, Allen, Barnes, Baxter, Breeze, Brownell, Clitheroe, Cottrell, Cozens, Faircloth, Frances, Frost, Gay, Girling, Hall, Hardingham, Hazelwood, Hipkin, Howell, Hubbert, Keeler, Knowles, Ladell, Lease, Meadows, Partridge, Plane, Plattan, Poynton, Ray, Scarff, Sexton, Shave, Shuton, Southgate, Strutt, Twiddy, and Wright.

In 1900, the parish priest was the Rev. Robert Rust Meadows, while the parish clerk was Robert Ladell.

== St Andrew's Parish Church ==
St Andrew's, Thurning, looks at first sight like a typical medieval church. Open every day, it stands alone, isolated from other buildings, on the Reepham Road and about a quarter of a mile north of The Rectory. Nearby is the former stable of the Rector, who sometimes lived at Wood Dalling. The church lacks a chancel, this having been demolished early in the 18th century. The east window has cross-linked tracery, clearly used to fill the arch of the lost chancel, and the east end of the north aisle has an unusual rectangular window.

In 1823, the church gained the furnishings of the old chapel of Corpus Christi College, Cambridge, when that was demolished. The aisle and the west end are filled with 18th-century box pews, and the interior is dominated by a huge three-deck pulpit at the east end of the church, designed by James Burrough. On each of the box pews, a sign gives the name of the property in the parish which paid rent for it. The middle of the church contains plain benches, the sanctuary has communion rails, and the south wall a line of hat pegs. Also on the south wall and in the sanctuary are several 18th-century memorials.

About 1833, the building was thoroughly restored.

According to Kelly's Directory for 1883:

The church of St. Andrew is a building of flint in the Perpendicular style and has chancel, nave, north aisle and square tower containing 1 bell. The register dates from the year 1715. The living is a rectory, tithe rent charge £370 with 23 acres (93,000 m^{2}) of glebe and residence, in the gift of the Master and fellows of Corpus Christi college, Cambridge, and held since 1858 by the Rev. John Fenwick B.D. late fellow and tutor of that college, J.P. Norfolk.

Thurning now forms part of the Church of England 'Reepham and Wensum Valley Team of Churches' benefice, which also has churches at Reepham, Salle, Wood Dalling, Bylaugh, Elsing Lyng, Sparham, Swannington, Weston Longville, Attlebridge, Alderford and Great & Little Witchingham.

== Thurning Hall ==
Thurning Hall is an 18th-century grade II listed country house with a walled garden, set in 40 acres (160,000 m^{2}) and surrounded by woodland. A large square three-storey Georgian building, it remains a private house but can be hired for weddings.

Shortly after the present house was built, it was advertised to let:

To be Lett from Year to Year, and entered upon immediately, a genteel modern built Brick House, pleasantly situated at Thurning, in Norfolk; consisting of a neat Vestibule and Stair-Case, two good Parlours, wainscotted, small Study, six Bed-chambers, Closets, Servants Garret, Kitchen, and all convenient Offices necessary for a small Family. - There is a very good Six-stall'd Stable, with a roomy Hay-chamber, Coach-house, Dogs-kennels, with a Granary over the same, small Garden, spacious Court Yard, Plantations, handsome Waters, well stocked with Carp and Tench; contiguous to the House are 5 acres (20,000 m^{2}) of rich Meadow and Pasture Land to be lett with the same, part of which (adjoining to the Stable) is inclosed with a new Paling towards the Road. - The House has been largely put into exceeding good Repair; Coppers, Kitchen Range, Jack, Bath and other Stoves, are already fixed for the Convenience of a Tenant. Note. William Wright, Gardener at the House, will shew the Premisses. - For further Particulars enquire of Peter ELWIN, of Booton, Esq. N.B. Carriers to and from Norwich pass by the House weekly.

Kelly's Directory, 1883, says:

The Hall, the seat of James Gay esq jun. B.A., D.L., J.P. is a mansion which stands upon rising ground, surrounded by trees: the river Thurn, which flows through the park, expands into a lake within it: the view from the front of the Hall is very fine. Some curious flint hatchet-heads and some Druidical remains have been dug up in the grounds of the Hall.

In 1996, the Hall was one of the locations for the filming of a BBC television version of George Eliot's The Mill on the Floss.

== Mills ==
During the first quarter of the 19th century, Thurning Tower Windmill worked closely with Thurning Water-mill. From auction particulars of 1826, it appears that each mill powered two sets of stones. Bryant's map (1826) shows the windmill immediately to the north of the water-mill and marks them together as 'Union Mills', which infers that they worked together.

A notice for an auction at the Black Boys Inn, Aylsham, to be held on 14 August 1826 advertised the sale of "Lot 2. A Water Corn Mill & Wind Mill, lately erected on the most improved construction & containing four pairs of stones & two flour dressers, with stable, cowhouse & other outhouses & 27 acres (110,000 m^{2}) or thereabouts of Arable land, meadow, wood & ozier ground adjoining. Also a Messuage & garden at a short distance from the Mill. The buildings & part of the lands in this Lot are in the occupation of William Reynolds, tenant from year to year & Possession of the remainder may be had at Michaelmas next."

In 1861, the notice of another auction to be held on 26 July 1861 advertised the sale of: "In BRISTON & THURNING Lot 2. A Messuage or Dwelling House with productive Garden adjoining, Watermill driving two pairs of stones, with large waterwheel in good repair & plentiful supply of water, Windmill, Cart Lodge, & other Outbuildings together with 30a. 1r. 19p. of Arable & Pasture LAND adjoining in the occupation of Chester Leman. This lot abuts upon Briston Common & land of James Gay, Esq. The Mills are capable of doing an extensive & lucrative business. Freehold."
