= Dickebusch =

Dickebusch may refer to:

- Dickebusch New Military Commonwealth War Graves Commission Cemetery and Extension, Belgium
- Dickebusch Old Military Commonwealth War Graves Commission Cemetery, Belgium
- Dikkebus or Dickebusch, a former village in Belgium, now part of Ypres
