= Erasmus Earle =

English lawyer and politician (1590 – 1667)

Erasmus Earle (15 September 1590 – 10 September 1667) was an English lawyer and politician, who became sergeant-at-law to Oliver Cromwell.

== Life ==
He was the only son of Thomas Earle of Sall, Norfolk and his wife Anne Founteyn (spellings vary). He was born at Sall and educated at Norwich Grammar School. He was admitted a student of Lincoln's Inn on 7 April 1612, and subsequently called to the bar there. Sir Julius Caesar appointed him steward of his manors of East Bradenham and Huntingfield Hall in 1626. He was a bencher of his inn between 1635 and 1641 inclusive, and was reader there in the autumn of 1639.

In 1640 he purchased Heydon Hall from Sir Robert Kemp. In 1644 he was appointed with John Thurloe secretary to the English Parliamentary commissioners for the treaty of Uxbridge. On 4 January 1647 he was returned to Parliament for the City of Norwich. As a member of the Long Parliament and Rump Parliament, he was no radical, but with the group of conservative lawyers, including Nathaniel Bacon, William Ellis, Nicholas Lechmere, Lislibone Long, and William Stephens.

On 12 October 1648 he was called to the degree of serjeant-at-law. The same year he was appointed steward, and the following year recorder of the city of Norwich. The latter office he held until 1653. The only public act of importance which marked his tenure of this office was the trial (for which he received a special commission) of some rioters in the streets of Norwich, showing their disgust at the suspension of the mayor by the parliament and their sympathy with the royalist cause. On Christmas Day 1648 Earle passed sentence of death on several of the ringleaders. Oliver Cromwell, on assuming the protectorate (16 December 1653), appointed Earle one of the counsel to the state, an office which he also held under Richard Cromwell, but he did not figure in any of the state trials of the period. On the Restoration of 1660 he was again called to the degree of serjeant-at-law (22 June 1660) (Siderfin's Reports, 3). His name does not appear much in the reports, but he amassed by his practice a considerable fortune, and founded the county family of Earle of Heydon Hall. He died on 7 September 1667, and was buried in the parish church of Heydon, Norfolk.

== Family ==
By his wife, Frances, his first cousin and daughter of James Fountaine of Salle, Norfolk, he had four sons and two daughters:

- Frances Earle (died 23 September 1618)
- John Earle (26 August 1622 – 12 April 1667)
- Martin Earle (baptism 8 March 1628, executor of his mother's will in 1672)
- Thomas Earle (27 April 1624 – 9 August 1659)
- Edward Earle (29 August 1631 – 3 October 1697)
- Anne Earle (1 May 1634 – 1691)

Erasmus Darwin was his great-great-grandson, through his daughter Anne who married the barrister William Darwin; hence the Erasmus forename in the Darwin family.
