= Heydon Hall =

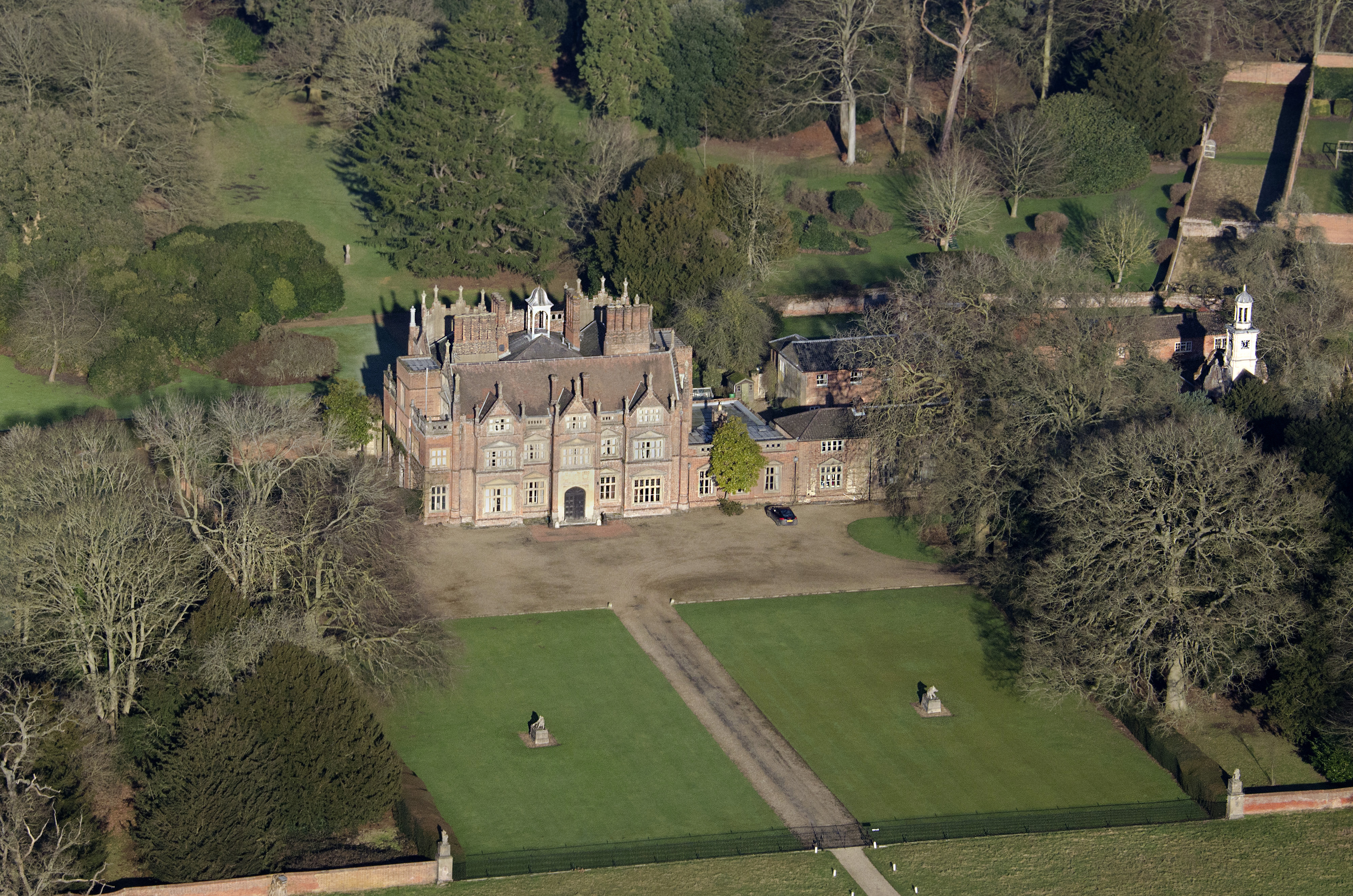

- Location within Norfolk

General information
- Type: Country house
- Architectural style: Elizabethan
- Location: Heydon, Norfolk, NR11 6RE, England
- Coordinates: 52.8053°N 1.1386°E
- Completed: 1584

Design and construction
- Architects: Henry Dynne, an Auditor of the Exchequer.

Heydon Hall is an Elizabethan house set in parkland near the village of Heydon, Norfolk, England.

The hall is Grade I listed on the National Heritage List for England, and its gardens are Grade II* listed on the Register of Historic Parks and Gardens.

== Location ==
The hall is just north-east of Heydon, and about 3 miles (4.8 km) north-east of Reepham, 6 miles (9.7 km) west of Aylsham and 14 miles (22.5 km) north-west of Norwich from where it is best reached via the B1149 road.

== History ==
The hall was built between 1581 and 1584 for Henry Dynne, an Auditor of the Receipt of the Exchequer. From the time of Oliver Cromwell it was first owned by the Earle family being originally bought by Erasmus Earle, a Serjeant-at-law to Cromwell. An ancient oak tree at Heydon Park is said to be where Cromwell once hid from a bull, during a visit to Erasmus. A descendant, Mary, daughter of Augustine Earle married William Bulwer and it then came into the Bulwer family of Wood Dalling.

The original large park covered approximately 600 acres (240 ha) but has mostly been broken up.

== Film location ==
The hall was featured in the BBC's 1996 version of The Moonstone. Part of the British film A Cock and Bull Story (2006) was filmed at the hall. In spring 2021, two days of filming towards This England took place in the grounds.
