= Peter Beck (schoolmaster) =

English soldier and schoolmaster

Francis Peter Beck CVO (27 June 1909 – 17 May 2002) was an English soldier and schoolmaster.

In the 1930s Beck was a peace campaigner, but in 1938, a year before the Second World War, he joined the British Army. After the war he became headmaster of Cheam School, serving there from 1947 to 1963.

== Life ==
The son of Arthur C. Beck CVO, of Heydon, Norfolk, nephew of Captain Frank Beck, Beck was educated at Gresham's School (where he was a cadet CSM in the Officers' Training Corps) and Magdalene College, Cambridge. There, he graduated BA in 1931 and proceeded to MA in 1944. In 1932, while working at Sandringham, he became a member and local representative of the New Commonwealth Society, a group campaigning to secure world peace by giving the League of Nations a military capability. This led to his working closely with Sir Norman Angell, the Labour member of parliament, winner of the Nobel Peace Prize for 1933.

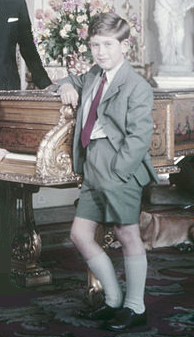
Prince Charles in 1957

In December 1938 Beck was commissioned as a second lieutenant into the Royal Norfolk Regiment. During the Second World War, he continued to serve in the same regiment, becoming adjutant of its 1st Battalion. In 1942 he passed the Staff College, and from 1942 to 1946 was brigade major of the 35th and 1st Army Tank Brigades.

In 1947, Beck was appointed as headmaster of Cheam. On 23 September 1957, he found himself at the centre of intense press interest when Prince Charles, Duke of Cornwall, then aged eight, arrived at his school, accompanied by his parents, Elizabeth II and Prince Philip, Duke of Edinburgh. Beck called a press conference at the school and made an appeal to the news media to be left in peace, but in the eighty-eight days of Charles's first term, no fewer than sixty-eight of them saw stories about the prince and the school carried in national newspapers. Beck twice caned Charles for "ragging".

In 1959, Beck resigned his commission in the Regular Army Reserve of Officers. In 1962, he was appointed a Commander of the Royal Victorian Order, and in 1963 retired from Cheam. In retirement, he lived at Hopton House, near Diss, Norfolk, and died in 2002 at the age of 92.

== Private life ==
In 1946 Beck married Anne Frances, a daughter of Douglas Crossman, of Royston, Hertfordshire. They had one son, Philip, and one daughter, Mary.

In retirement, Beck became the Secretary of the West Suffolk Horse Show Society.
