= Bluestone railway station =

Former railway station in Norfolk, England

Coordinates: 52.7962°N 1.1738°E

Bluestone
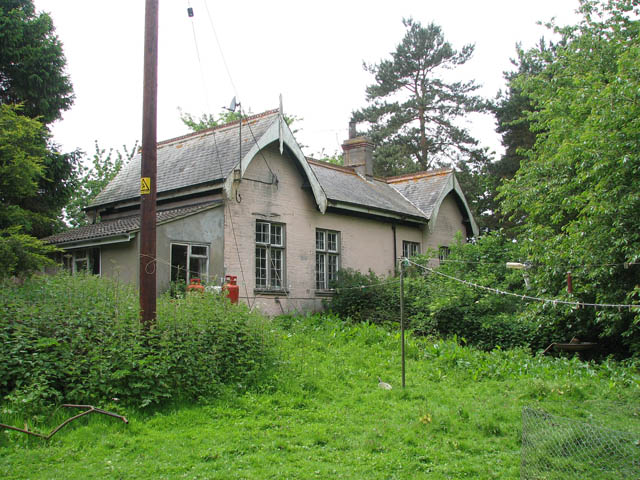
- The station in 2009; it is now a private house

General information
- Location: Heydon and Oulton, Broadland; England
- Grid reference: TG141267
- Platforms: 1

Other information
- Status: Disused

History
- Original company: Eastern and Midlands Railway
- Pre-grouping: Midland and Great Northern Joint Railway

Key dates
- 5 April 1883: Opened
- 1 March 1916: Closed
Location

Bluestone railway station served the villages of Heydon and Oulton, in Norfolk, England. It was a stop on the Midland and Great Northern Joint Railway.

== History ==
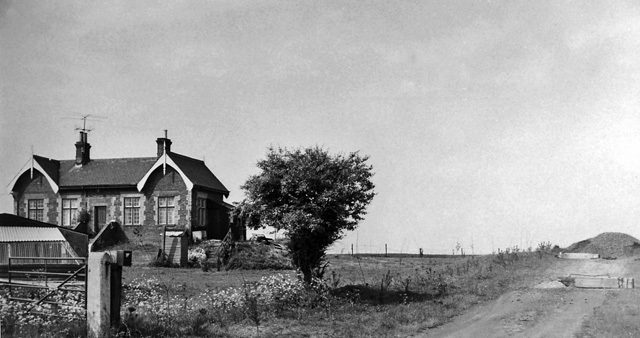
The station in 1963

The station opened in the late 19th century to serve the surrounding farms and settlements. It lay just within Heydon's civil parish. RAF Oulton, a now-disused airfield, was constructed in 1939-40 between the village of Oulton and the site of the station.

It was closed in 1916, owing to low passenger numbers.

Preceding station	Disused railways	Following station
Corpusty and Saxthorpe; Line and station closed	Midland and Great Northern; Yarmouth Line	Aylsham North; Line and station closed

== The site today ==
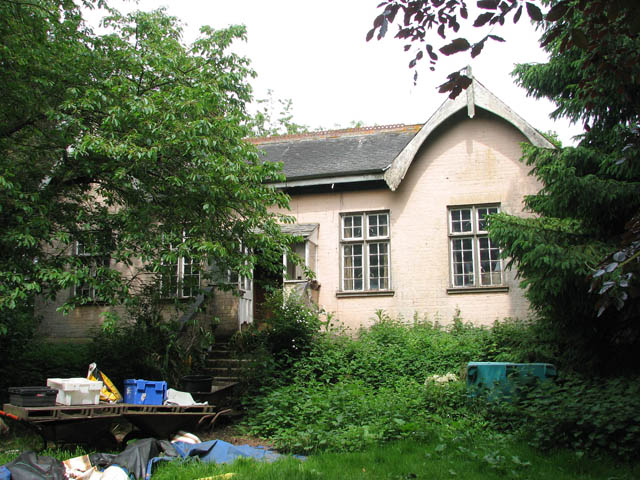
The station in 2009

The stationmaster's house remains in situ, with Weavers' Way footpath now occupying the trackbed.
