= Church of Saints Peter and Paul, Salle =

Anglican parish church in Norfolk, England

- Salle Church
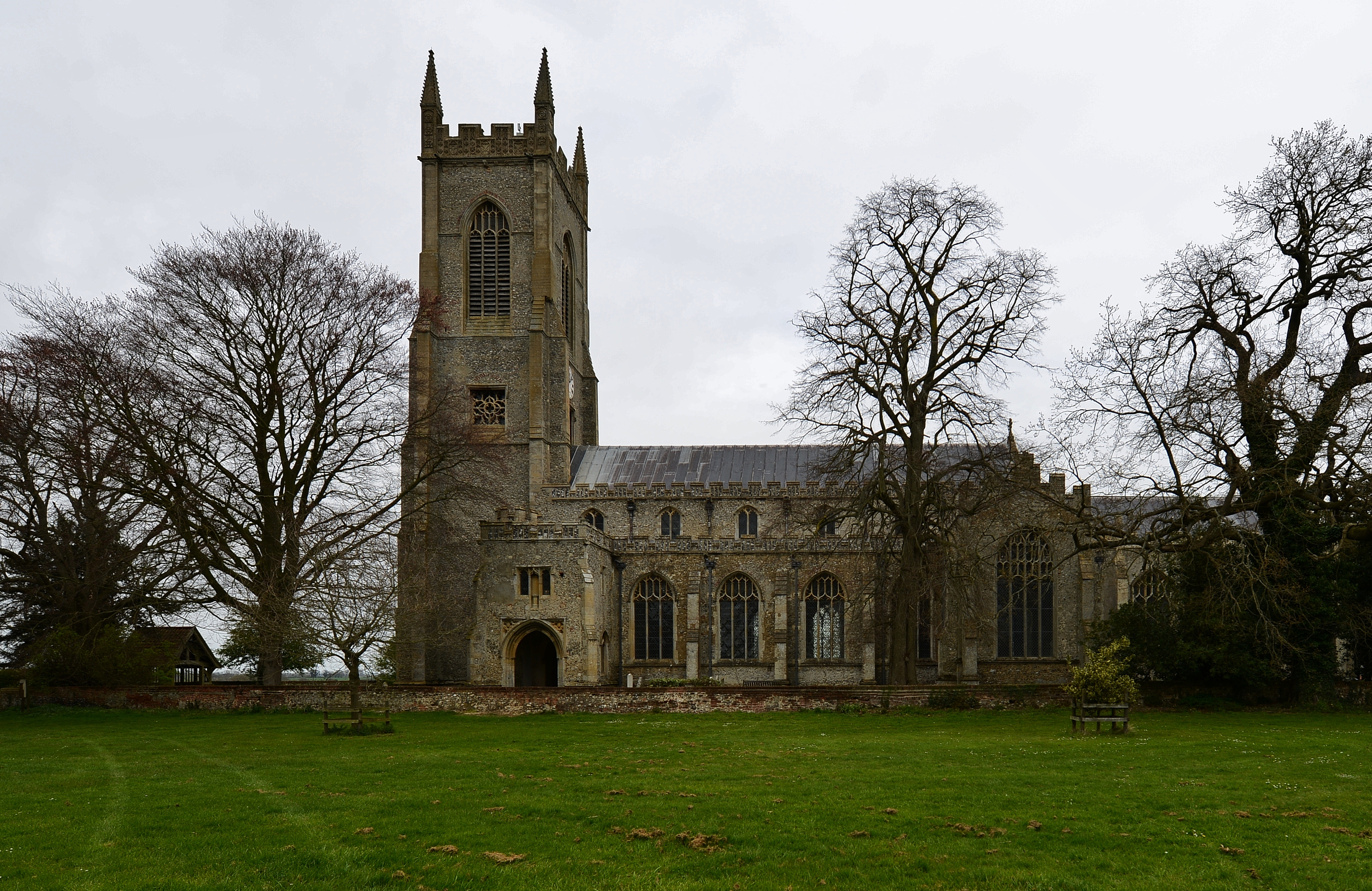
- Church of Saints Peter and Paul, Salle
- 52°46′49″N 1°07′39″E
- OS grid reference: TG 11036 24888
- Country: England
- Denomination: Anglican
- Previous denomination: Roman Catholic

History
- Dedication: Saints Peter and Paul

Architecture
- Functional status: Active
- Heritage designation: Grade I listed
- Designated: 10 May 1961
- Style: Perpendicular Gothic
- Groundbreaking: Early 15th century
- Completed: c.1511

Specifications
- Length: 171 feet

Administration
- Archdiocese: Canterbury
- Diocese: Norwich

The Church of Saints Peter and Paul is a Grade I listed medieval Anglican parish church in the village of Salle, Norfolk, England. The church was begun in the early 15th century, and completed c. 1511. Despite serving a parish of only 50 inhabitants, the church is 171 feet long, with a tower 130 feet high. The church is often considered to be one of the finest in Norfolk, for example by Simon Jenkins and John Betjeman.

== History ==
In the later Middle Ages, East Anglia prospered due to the wool trade, leaving a legacy of vast village churches such as Lavenham, Long Melford and Southwold. Salle was no exception. It was home to a cluster of wealthy merchants: Boleyns, Brewes and Briggs, Mautebys, Morleys and Uffords. They paid for the church to be rebuilt on a grand scale, using expensive Barnack limestone ashlar instead of just local flints. Carved arms and initials help to identify who funded which part: for example, an E for Everard Brigg appears on the tower parapet, while a T for Thomas Brigg decorates the south transept. As well as glorifying God, pouring their wealth into religious building enabled merchants' souls to be remembered in future parishioners' prayers, speeding their passage through Purgatory. It was also a way to compete with neighbouring merchants and villages, like Cawston, which was also rebuilding its church at this time. Despite being parochial rather than collegiate, the church had seven priests, with additional cantors, leading to the construction of choir stalls.

Inscriptions and stained glass windows, now vanished but recorded by antiquarians, allow some parts of the building to be dated – though the entire building was set out at once, different parts were completed at different times. The nave had glass referring to Thomas Boleyn, who died in 1411, suggesting that by then it had been completed. Extant heraldry also dates the lowest stage of the tower to 1405–13. The chancel was built in the 1430s, with an inscription stating that it was completed in 1440; the east window was glazed before 1441 (based on heraldry). The transepts and south porch followed in the 1440s, and the building was substantially complete by c. 1450. Later works included remodelling of the south transept c. 1470 and the completing of the tower in 1511.

Many of the medieval fittings, like the rood screen and stained glass, were damaged or destroyed after the Reformation, but an unusual amount still survives, as the church largely avoided Victorian restoration. However, there were limited restorations in 1867, 1903 and 1912.

The church has been the recording location of numerous choral music albums, in particular by the Tallis Scholars.

== Architecture ==
The 15th-century reconstruction was total, albeit drawn out, and left the church a unified example of the Perpendicular Gothic style. It has an aisled nave of six bays, a west tower, north and south porches and transepts, and an aisleless three-bay chancel. The tower has a west door decorated with carved censing angels and a heraldic frieze. Due to the instability of flint construction, the walls are six feet thick. Under the tower is a rare original ringing gallery, and the tower as a whole is unusually unrestored, without modern steel or concrete reinforcement. Square traceried openings, some of the largest and most elaborate in Norfolk (commonly misnamed 'sound holes') ventilate the clock chamber. The buttresses finish at the bottom of the bell stage, letting the top of the tower rise unencumbered towards the sky. Julian Flannery considers the tower to epitomise the high, austere style of Norfolk, especially as, unlike many other local churches, it (belatedly) received its ornamental parapet.

Both porches are two-storeyed with tierceron vaults to the ground floor. Unusually, the north porch also has an elaborate lierne vault to its upper room, or parvise. Its painted bosses show angels, green men and the Coronation of the Virgin, suggesting a possible use as a lady chapel. The nave is high and light, with a clerestory above the arcades and an angel roof. This is held together with metal ties, as it lacks any form of tie- or collar-beam. The transepts are small, merely opening off the aisles; there is no separate crossing. They would have contained side altars: both have piscinae in their east walls. They have more delicate roofs, decorated with a cusped lattice pattern. The choir is lower than the nave, allowing a window above the chancel arch. The south-east windowsill is lower, forming a sedilia. Next to this is a piscina with a double-ogee canopy. The altar rails are of c.1637, after Archbishop Laud decreed that all altars must be enclosed. The choir also has another fine roof, with nine carved bosses at the apex illustrating the life of Christ.

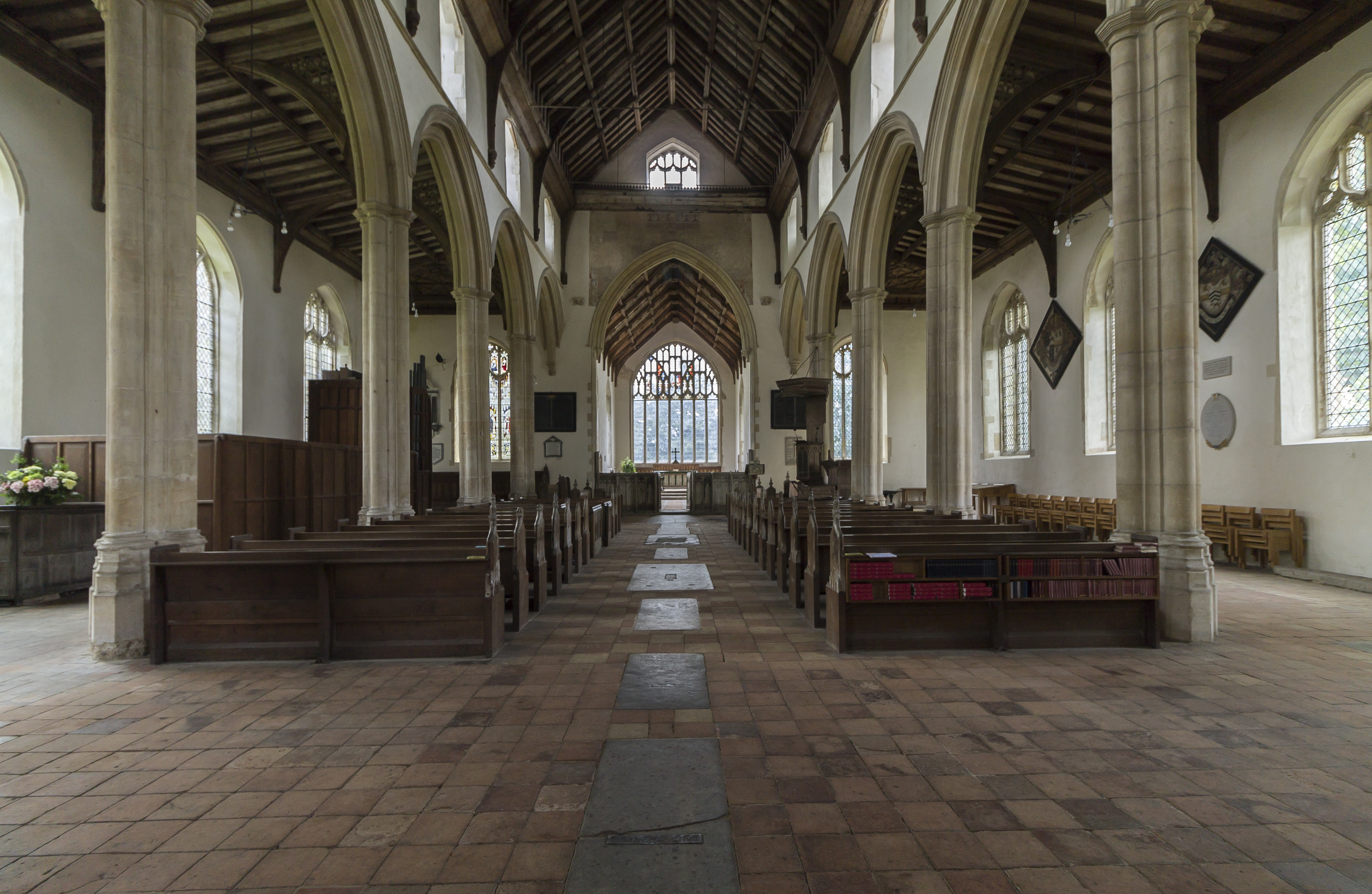
General view of the interior

== Fittings ==
=== Font ===
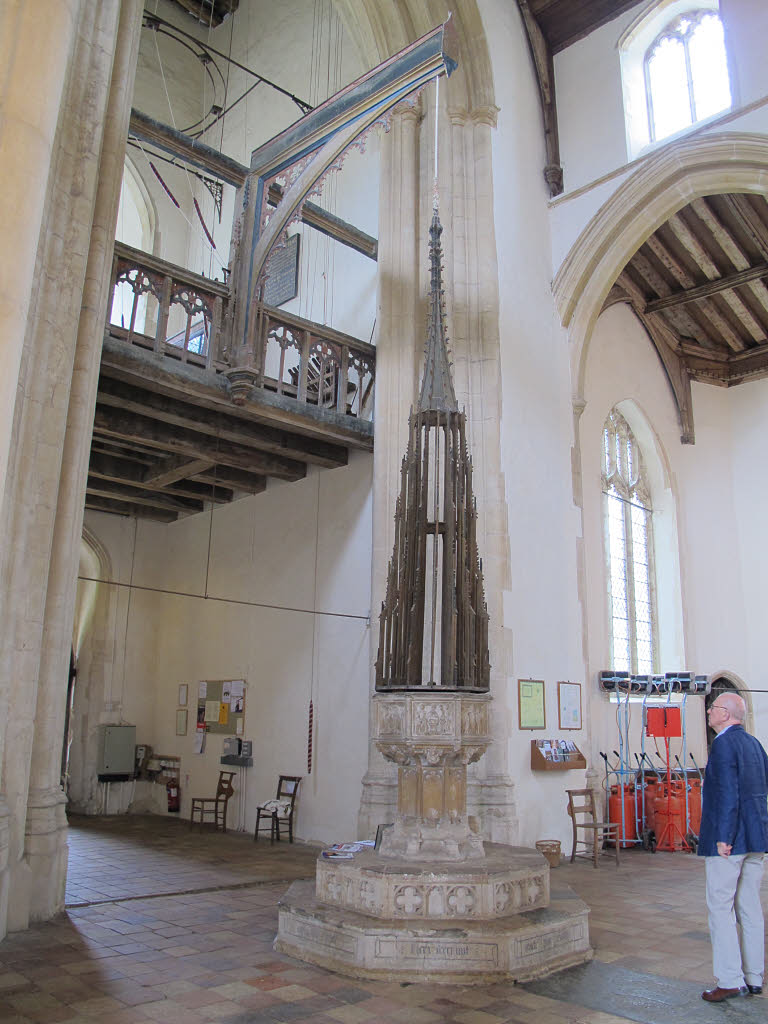
The font, cover and crane

The octagonal font dates to c. 1437, and is of a local type depicting the seven sacraments. The eighth side shows the crucifixion. Above the font is a damaged timber cover, preventing the holy water being stolen for improper use. It is suspended from a crane fixed to the ringing gallery.

=== Pews ===
Some of the original bench-ends survive, with ornamental poppyheads, though the benches themselves have largely been replaced. Church seating was a relatively new phenomenon in the 15th century, reflecting the growing importance of preaching following the emergence of the friars as a religious force.

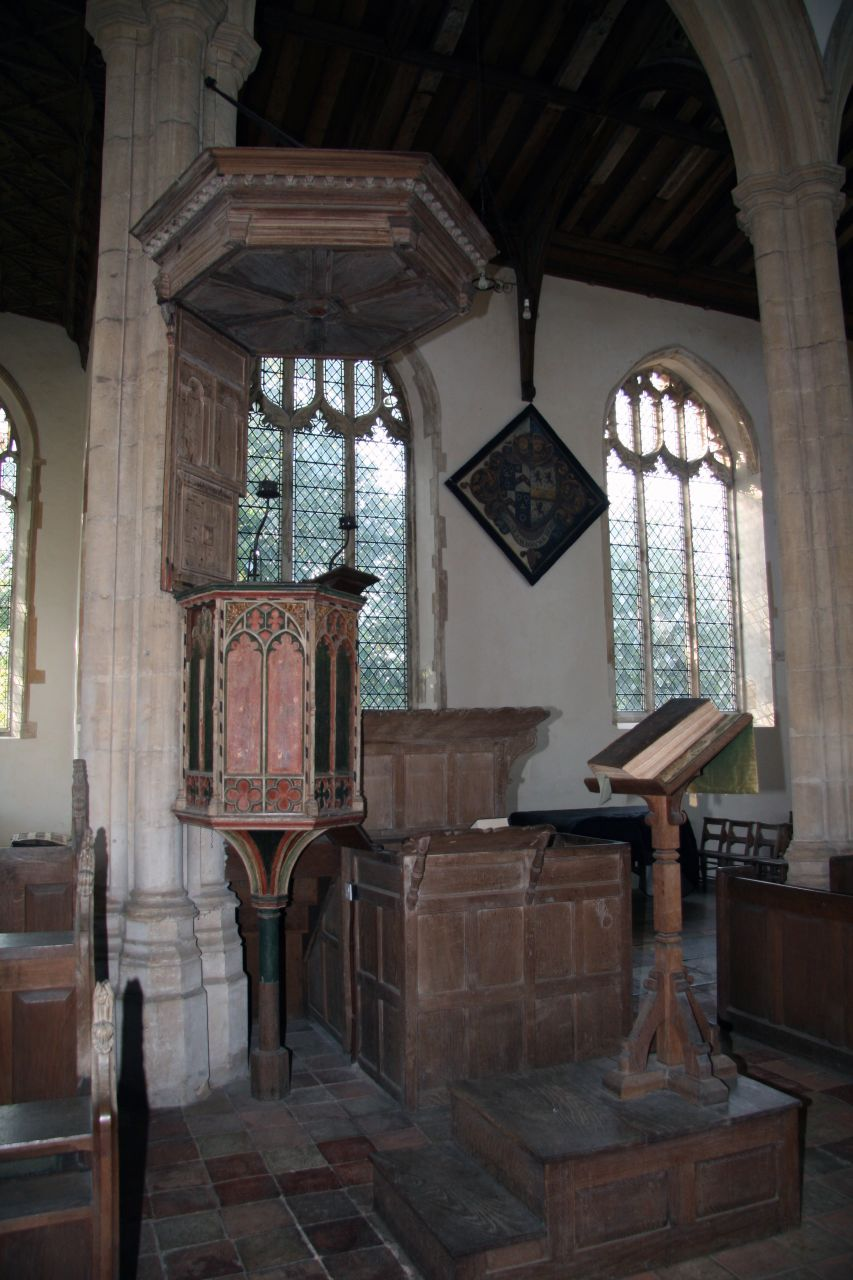
The pulpit

=== Pulpit ===
The original hexagonal wine-glass pulpit survives, with red and green painting, though it was adapted c.1611 with a tester and clerk's desk to convert it into a triple-decker. Like the pews, the pulpit shows the new prominence of preaching.

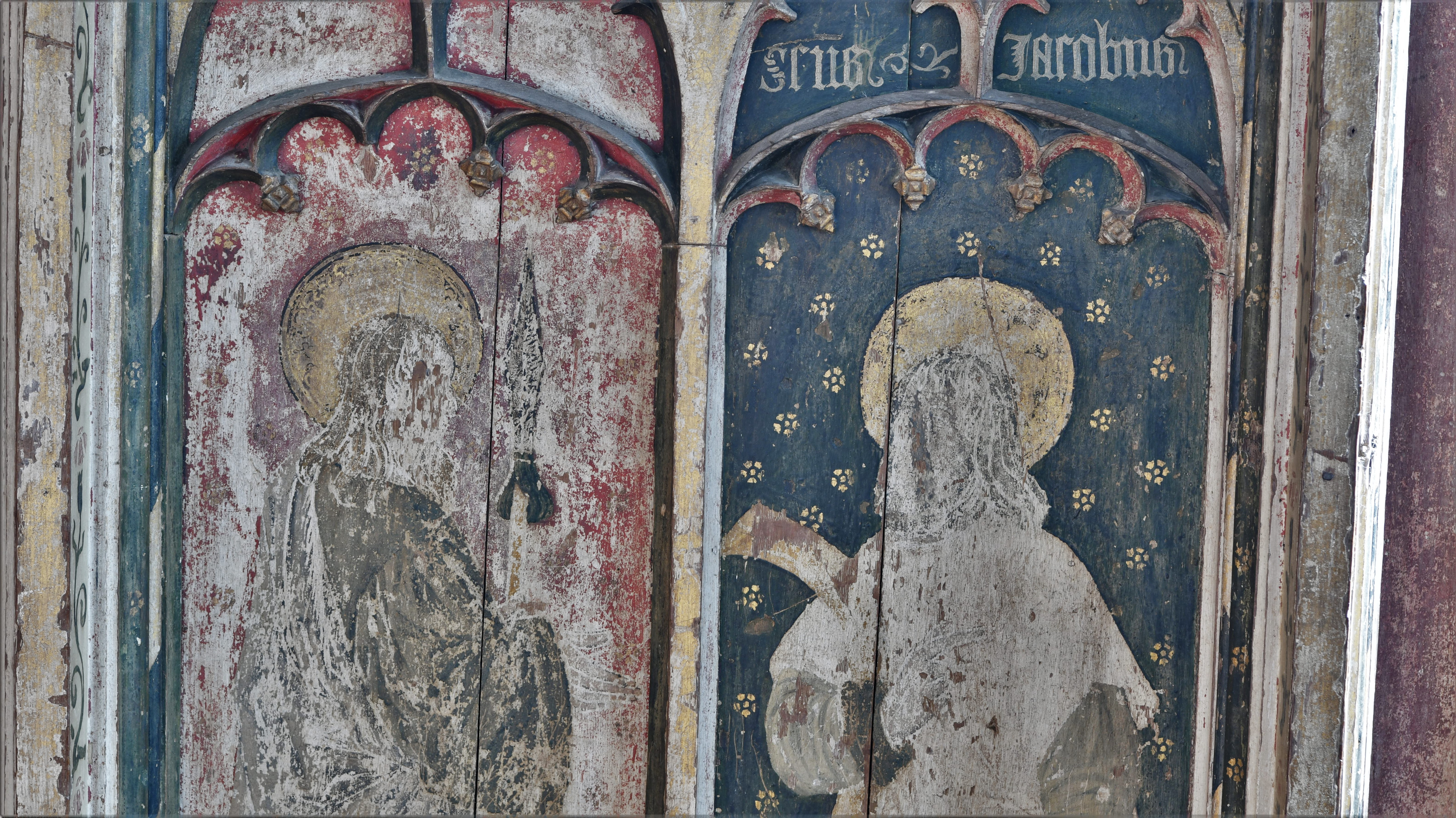
Painted panels on the rood screen

=== Screen ===
Just the dado of the rood screen survived the Reformation. It is itself a very substantial piece, nearly six feet high. Four defaced painted panels depict the evangelists, while on the gates are painted the four doctors of the Church. The screen would have had traceried openings, a loft and a carved crucifixion above, all now destroyed. High above the chancel arch, the carved and painted canopy above the screen survives, as do the two stone caryatids that would have carried the rood beam. The roof is also more elaborate above the screen, so as to focus attention on it.

A misericord in the choir

=== Choir Stalls ===
There are twenty-six choir stalls lining the chancel walls and the rear of the screen. They feature misericords, with a variety of religious, grotesque and humorous carvings on the undersides and arm rests.

=== Memorials ===
Set into the church floor are many memorial brasses to the donors who paid for the building, including Geoffrey and Alice Boleyn (great-grandparents of Anne; Geoffrey died in 1440), and Thomas (died 1441) and Katherine Roose with their eight children knelt at their feet. In addition, there are 18th-century marble memorials to the Hase family of Salle Park blocking the north transept window, and hatchments hanging in the south aisle.

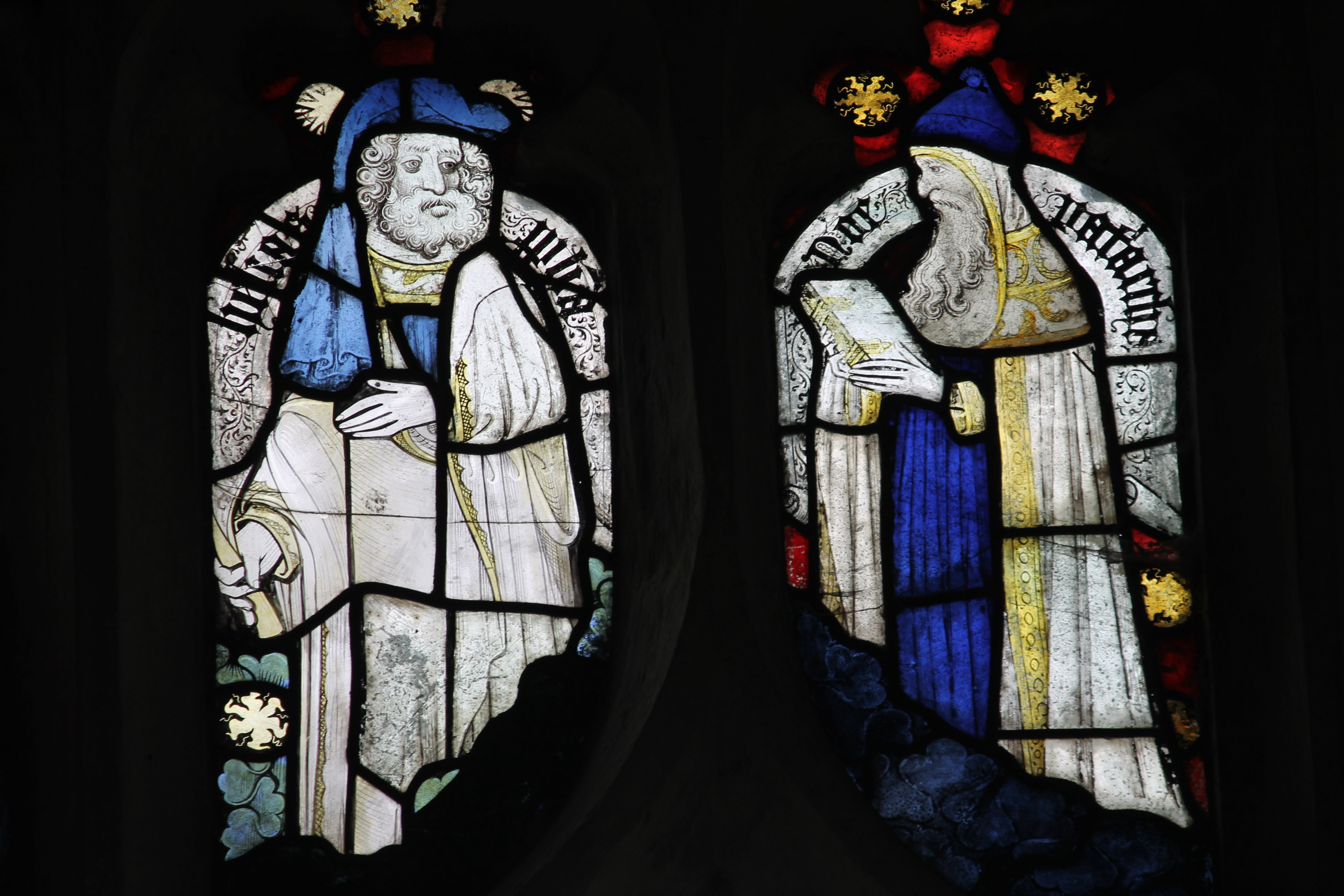
Medieval stained glass

=== Stained glass ===
While most of the stained glass that would originally have filled all the windows has been lost, some fragments survive in the tracery lights of the chancel and south transept. They show the donor Thomas Brigg and his wives, the Nine Orders of Angels, prophets, kings and saints. There is also glass of 1882–96 in the north transept.

== Folklore ==
An unsubstantiated legend, first mentioned in 1536, holds that, after her execution, Anne Boleyn was buried in secret at her ancestral church of Salle. The generally accepted version of events is that she was buried with other executed nobles at the church of St Peter ad Vincula in the Tower of London.
