= Saxthorpe =

Village in Norfolk, England

Coordinates: 52.83025°N 1.1397°E

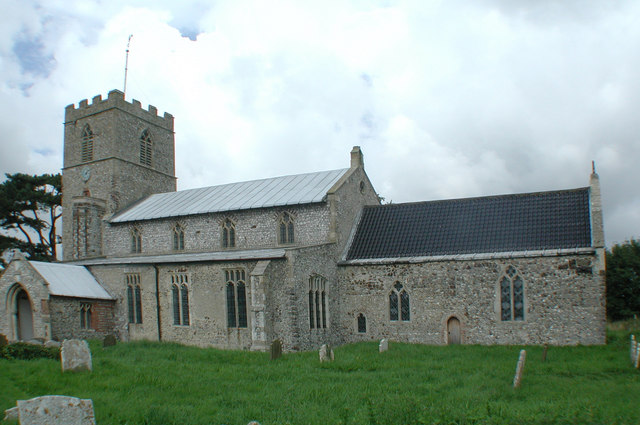
- St Andrew's church, Saxthorpe, Norfolk

- Location within Norfolk
- OS grid reference: TG116315
  - London: 131 miles (211 km)
- Civil parish: Corpusty and Saxthorpe
- District: North Norfolk
- Shire county: Norfolk
- Region: East
- Country: England
- Sovereign state: United Kingdom
- Post town: NORWICH
- Postcode district: NR11
- Dialling code: 01263
- Police: Norfolk
- Fire: Norfolk
- Ambulance: East of England

Saxthorpe is a village in the civil parish of Corpusty and Saxthorpe, in the North Norfolk district, in the county of Norfolk, England. The village is 12 miles (19 km) west south west of Cromer and 16.3 miles (26.2 km) north north west of Norwich. The village lies 6.2 miles (10.0 km) south west of the town of Holt. It is in the civil parish of Corpusty and Saxthorpe.

The village is passed to the north and east by the B1149 between Holt and Norwich. The nearest railway station is at Sheringham for the Bittern Line which runs between Sheringham, Cromer and Norwich. The Corpusty and Saxthorpe railway station closed in 1959 but still exists, though the track has been lifted.

== History ==
The villages name means 'Saxi's outlying settlement'.

Saxthorpe has an entry in the Domesday Book of 1086. In the great book Saxthorpe is recorded with the spellings Sastorp, Saxiorp and Saxthorp, and is said to be in the ownership of the King and in the custody of Godric, Count Alan and Ribralt from him. The survey also notes that there are 50 goats, 20 cattle and 4 cobs (draught horses).

For more details about Saxthorpe and its sister village of Corpusty (divided by the River Bure) read the late Janet Wilson's A History of Corpusty & Saxthorpe, listed with a different title in the Corpusty entry. Janet was a Corpusty native and spent most of her life living in the village; she was also schoolteacher at Corpusty for many years.

On 1 April 1935 the parish was abolished and merged with Corpusty. At the 1931 census (the last before the abolition of the parish), Saxthorpe had a population of 230.

== The Parish Church of St Andrew ==
The parish church dedicated to Saint Andrew was constructed in 1482 by the lord of the manor, although the chancel and tower are thought to be older. The church has a 15th-century tracery screen, above panels which are decorated with flowers and foliage. The beams of the north aisle roof have a boss with a grinning lion carving. The altar rail is carved with pillars and balusters and dates from the 17th century. The church is a Grade I listed building.
