= Wood Dalling =

Village in Norfolk, England

Coordinates: 52.80009°N 1.09736°E

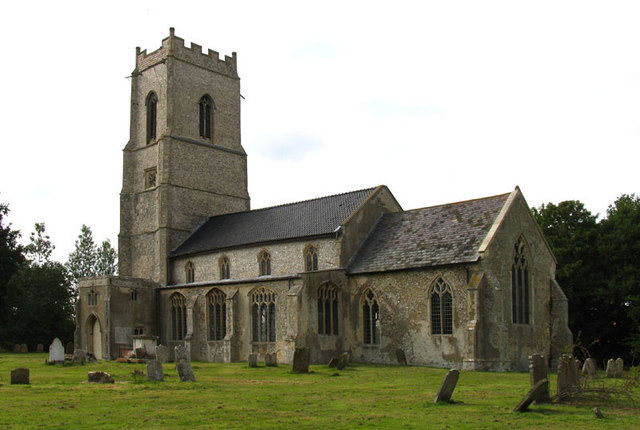
- Church of St Andrew, Wood Dalling

- Location within Norfolk
- Area: 9.89 km^{2} (3.82 sq mi)
- Population: 209 (2011)
  - Density: 21/km^{2} (54/sq mi)
- OS grid reference: TG089270
- Civil parish: Wood Dalling
- District: Broadland
- Shire county: Norfolk
- Region: East
- Country: England
- Sovereign state: United Kingdom
- Post town: NORWICH
- Postcode district: NR11
- Dialling code: 01263
- Police: Norfolk
- Fire: Norfolk
- Ambulance: East of England
- UK Parliament: Broadland and Fakenham

Wood Dalling is a village and civil parish in Norfolk, England. It is located 8 miles (13 km) south of Holt and 3 miles (4.8 km) north of Reepham, the nearest market towns.

== History ==
The village's name means 'Dalla's people'; the use of 'Wood' distinguishes it from nearby Field Dalling.

Two places in the parish are mentioned in the Domesday Book: Dalling and Tyby.

== Geography ==
The civil parish has an area of 3.82 mi^{2} (9.9 km^{2}) and in the 2001 census had a population of 181 in 78 households, increasing to 209 in 91 households by the 2011 census.

Adjacent parishes include Guestwick, Heydon, Salle and Thurning

== Governance ==
For the purposes of local government, the parish falls within the district of Broadland. The parish includes the hamlets of Norton Corner and Tyby.

The parish formed part of the hundred of Eynesford. Today, the parish forms part of the ward of Eynesford, which returns a councillor to Broadland District Council.

Wood Dalling lies within the constituency of Broadland and is represented at Parliament by Jerome Mayhew of the Conservative Party. For the purposes of local government, the parish falls within the district of Broadland.

== Amenities ==
There is a village hall, with a post office at Norton Corner.

The Wood Dalling Cycle Loop is a waymarked circular cycle trail along lanes around the parish and its immediate environs.
