= Oulton, Norfolk =

Village in Norfolk, England

Coordinates: 52.811167°N 1.167297°E

Oulton
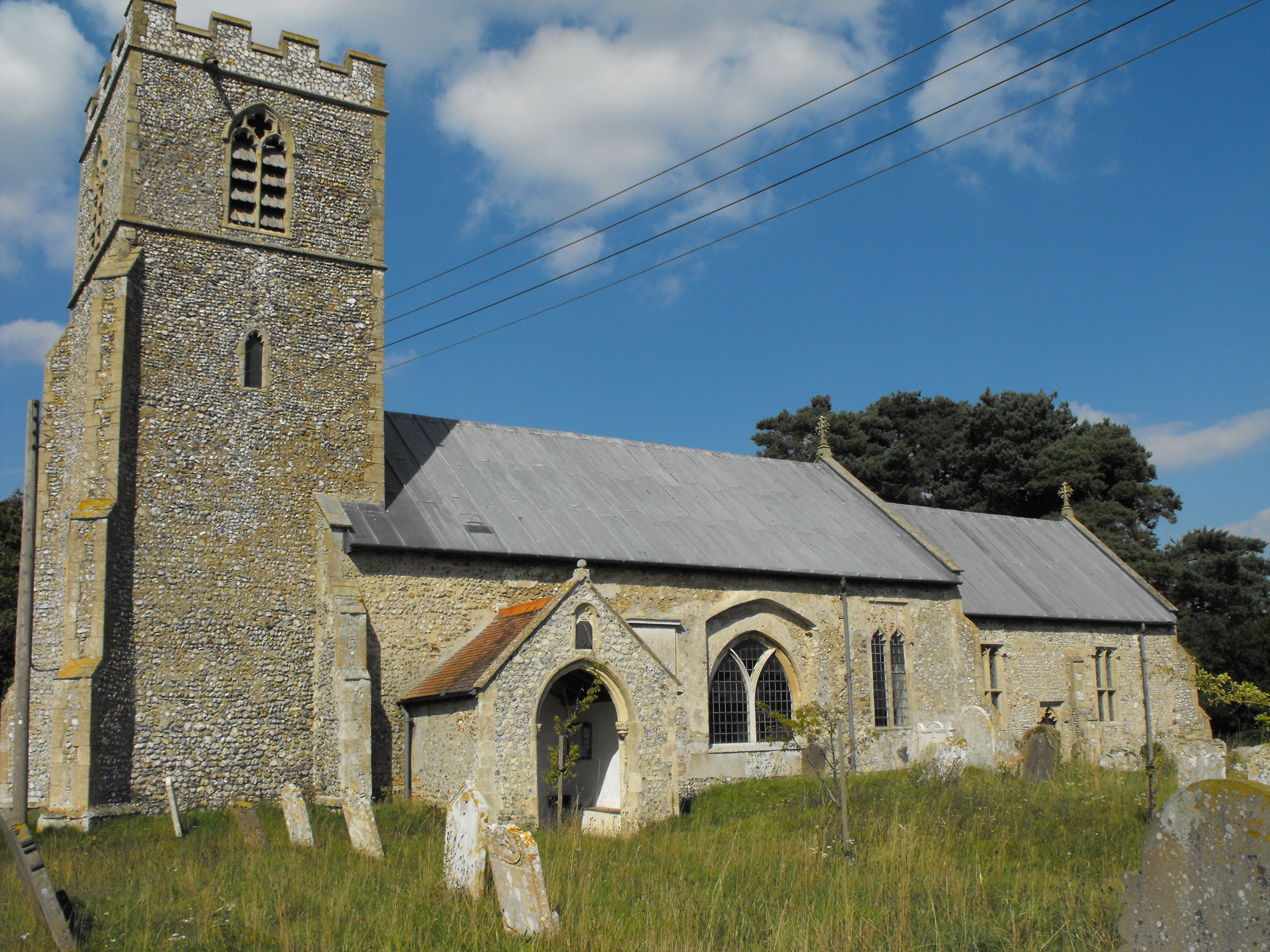
- St Peter and St Paul's Church

- Location within Norfolk
- Area: 10.58 km^{2} (4.08 sq mi)
- Population: 193 (2011)
  - Density: 18/km^{2} (47/sq mi)
- OS grid reference: TG135284
- Civil parish: Oulton
- District: Broadland
- Shire county: Norfolk
- Region: East
- Country: England
- Sovereign state: United Kingdom
- Post town: NORWICH
- Postcode district: NR11
- Police: Norfolk
- Fire: Norfolk
- Ambulance: East of England

Oulton is a village and civil parish in Norfolk, England. Nearby towns are Reepham and Aylsham. The parish covers an area of 10.58 km^{2} (4.08 sq mi) and had a population of 196 in 74 households at the 2001 census, reducing slightly to a population of 193 in 81 households at the 2011 census. The village is dispersed with one area of settlement in the vicinity of the church of Saints Peter and Paul, and another area along Oulton Street to the east.

== History ==
The parish formed part of the hundred of South Erpingham, and used to be spelled variously, including Olton (short for the "Old Town") or Owlton — the place is still pronounced as per the latter by some locals today.

== Notable buildings ==
Oulton Hall is a grade II listed building, parts of the privately owned hall date back to the 18th century. In the spring of 2015, the hall was extensively damaged by fire. The grounds of the hall are occasionally opened to the public for the National Gardens Scheme charity.

In addition to the historic parish church, St Peter and St Paul's, there is also the grade II-star listed Oulton Chapel, which following restoration is now open to the public on certain days.

The Textile Conservation Studio of the National Trust, a satellite of their nearby Blickling Hall estate, is located on Oulton Street.

== Irmingland ==
The hamlet of Irmingland is located in the civil parish of Oulton. This was in medieval times a small village, which had its own parish church — St Andrew's — which closed in 1557 and what little remains has been ploughed over. Whilst its parish united with Oulton's, its rectory united with that of Heydon, a village to the southwest.

'Irmingland's' name origin is uncertain 'Land of Eorma's people' or perhaps, 'land connected with Eorma'.

== See also ==
- RAF Oulton
- Bluestone railway station
