= Corpusty =

Village in Norfolk, England

Coordinates: 52.8273°N 1.1341°E

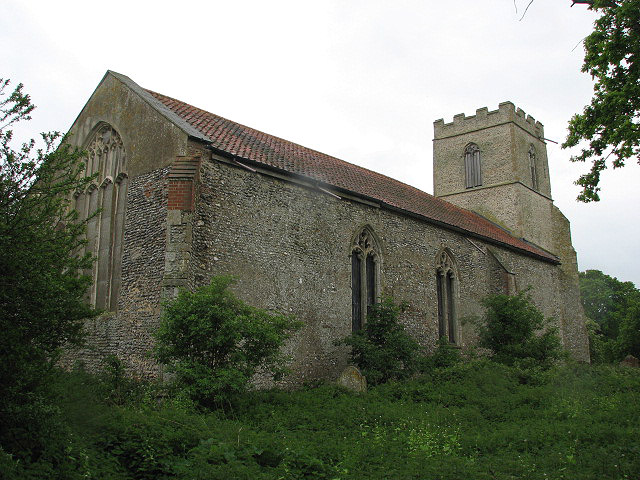
- St Peter's Church

- Location within Norfolk
- Area: 12.73 km^{2} (4.92 sq mi)
- Population: 697 (2011 census)
  - Density: 55/km^{2} (140/sq mi)
- OS grid reference: TG114293
- Civil parish: Corpusty and Saxthorpe
- District: North Norfolk
- Shire county: Norfolk
- Region: East
- Country: England
- Sovereign state: United Kingdom
- Post town: NORWICH
- Postcode district: NR11
- Dialling code: 01263
- Police: Norfolk
- Fire: Norfolk
- Ambulance: East of England
- UK Parliament: North Norfolk

Corpusty is a village and former civil parish, now in the parish of Corpusty and Saxthorpe, in the North Norfolk district, in the English county of Norfolk.

Corpusty is located on the River Bure, about 16 mi (26 km) from Norwich and 6 mi (9.7 km) from Holt.

== History ==
Corpusty's name is of Viking origin and derives from the Old Norse for 'raven's path'.

In the Domesday Book of 1086, Corpusty is recorded as a settlement of six households in the hundred of South Erpingham. In 1086, the village was divided between the estates of William de Warenne, William de Beaufeu and William d'Ecouis.

At the turn of the 18th century, Corpusty watermill was built. The mill was heavily damaged in a flood in 1912, with the mill finally closing in 1965.

The village was once home to Corpusty and Saxthorpe railway station, which opened in 1883 as part of the Midland and Great Northern Joint Railway. It was a stop on their route between Melton Constable and Yarmouth Beach. The station closed in 1959, yet much of the infrastructure still remains.

== Geography ==
On 1 April 1935, the parish of Saxthorpe was merged with Corpusty; the parish was renamed 'Corpusty & Saxthorpe' on 1 April 2007. In 1931, the parish of Corpusty (prior to the merge) had a population of 434.

Corpusty is located along the River Bure and close to the course of the B1149, between Holt and Norwich.

== St Peter's Church ==
Corpusty's parish church is dedicated to Saint Peter and largely dates to the 15th century. St Peter's is located on Norwich Road and has been Grade II listed since 1960.

St Peter's became derelict in the late-Medieval era and was saved from ruin by a heavy restoration in 1891. The church again fell into disuse in the 1960s and suffered from vandalism and arson until it became a focus in a campaign by Roger Last and Billa Harrod to restore abandoned churches. This campaign eventually developed into the Norfolk Churches Trust which cares for St Peter's Church.

== Amenities ==
Corpusty Primary School is located in the village and operates as part of the Synergy Multi-Academy Trust. In 2022, the school was rated 'Good' by Ofsted.

The Duke's Head public house in Corpusty is still open and has operated on the site since 1794.

== Little London ==
The hamlet of Little London lies to the north-west of the village, also on the south side of the River Bure. It comprises one street, which is named 'The Street'; both Corpusty and Saxthorpe also have streets so named.

== Governance ==
Corpusty is part of the electoral ward of Stody for local elections and is part of the district of North Norfolk.

The village's national constituency is North Norfolk, which has been represented by the Liberal Democrat Steff Aquarone MP since 2024.

== War memorial ==
Corpusty's war memorial is shared with nearby Saxthorpe and is a marble plaque located in St Andrew's Church, Saxthorpe. The following men, who were likely from Corpusty, are listed for the First World War:

Rank	Name	Unit	Date of death	Burial
Gnr.	George Wells	Royal Garrison Artillery	10 May 1915	Harton Cemetery
Pte.	James Roberts	44th (West Australia) Bn., AIF	11 Jun. 1917	Boulogne East Cemetery
Pte.	Samuel H. Smithson	2nd Bn., Lincolnshire Regiment	16 Aug. 1917	Tyne Cot
Pte.	Walter A. Potter	19th Bn., Middlesex Regiment	9 Jun. 1917	Dickebusch New Cemetery
Pte.	James A. Pye	1/4th Bn., Norfolk Regiment	19 Apr. 1917	Gaza War Cemetery
Pte.	John Hancock	7th Bn., Norfolk Regt.	13 Oct. 1915	Loos Memorial
Pte.	Sidney J. Faircloth	8th Bn., Norfolk Regt.	1 Jul. 1916	Thiepval Memorial
Pte.	Henry C. Middleton	8th Bn., Norfolk Regt.	5 Oct. 1916	Thiepval Memorial
Pte.	Walter R. Field	10th Bn., Queen's Royal Regiment	10 Dec. 1916	Lijssenthoek Cemetery
Pte.	Horace H. Carr	4th Bn., Worcestershire Regiment	13 Apr. 1918	Ploegsteert Memorial

And, the following for the Second World War:

Rank	Name	Unit	Date of death	Burial
Cpl.	Herbert J. Roberts	11 (Field) Coy., Royal Engineers	28 Jun. 1940	St Andrew's Churchyard, Saxthorpe
