= Dickebusch Old Military Commonwealth War Graves Commission Cemetery =

Belgian cemetery

Dickebusch Old Military Cemetery
- Commonwealth War Graves Commission
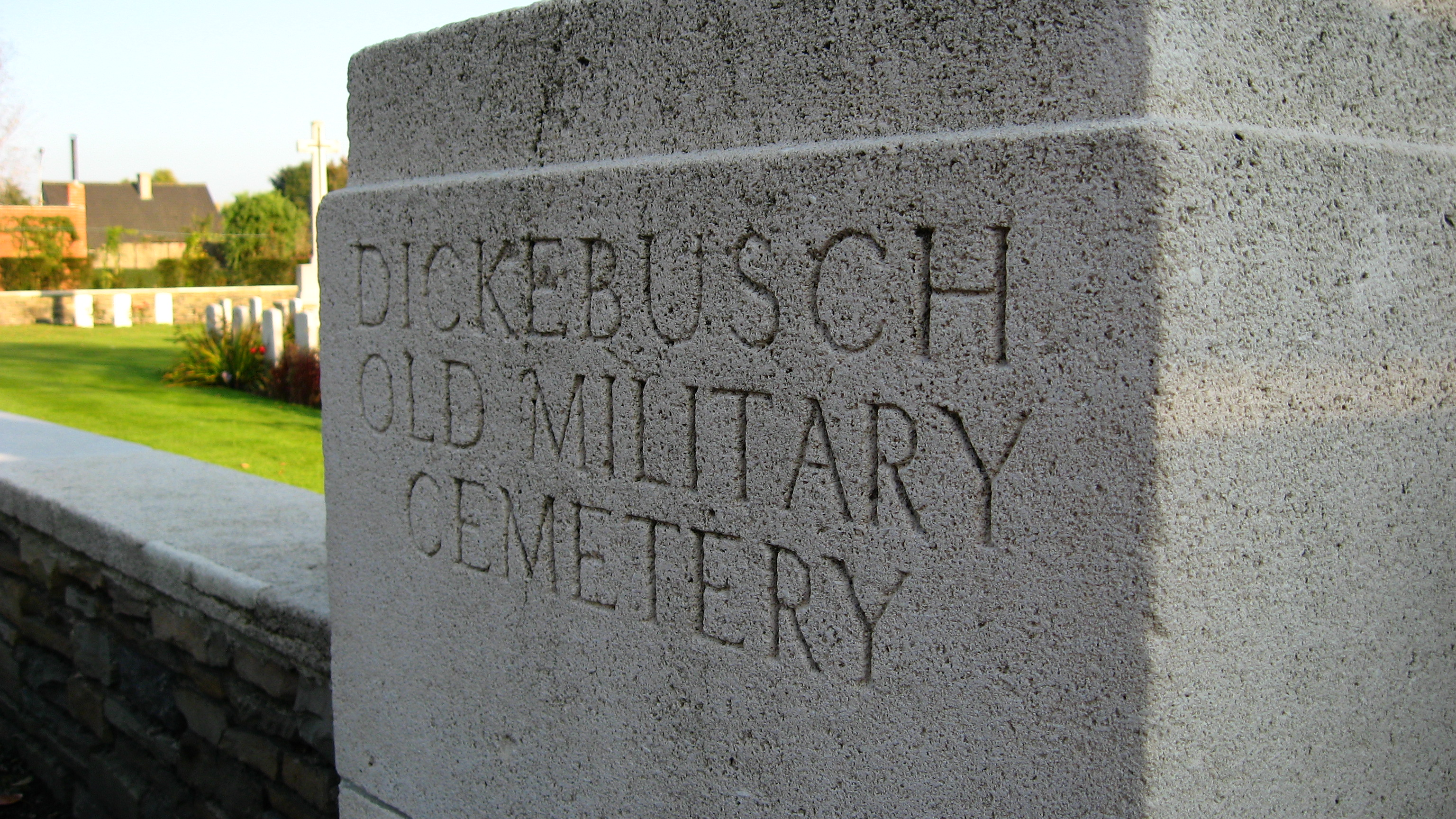
- Used for those deceased 1915, 1940
- Established: 1915
- Location: 50°49′09″N 02°49′59″E near Dikkebus, West Flanders, Belgium
- Designed by: J R Truelove
- Total burials: 57
- Unknowns: 3

Burials by nation
- Allied Powers: United Kingdom 43; Canada: 3; Other: 1

Burials by war
- World War I: 47 World War II: 10
- Statistics source: wo1.be and CWGC

Dickebusch Old Military Cemetery is a Commonwealth War Graves Commission (CWGC) burial ground for the dead of the First World War and the Second World War located in the Ypres Salient in Belgium on the Western Front of the first war.

The cemetery grounds were assigned to the United Kingdom in perpetuity by King Albert I of Belgium in recognition of the sacrifices made by the British Empire in the defence and liberation of Belgium during the first war.

== Foundation ==
The cemetery, opposite the local churchyard, was founded in January 1915 when this area was in the front line. It was used until March 1915, when a new cemetery was established in the village.

The cemetery was used again in May 1940, for ten British troops killed during the retreat after the invasion of Belgium by Nazi forces.

The cemetery was designed by J R Truelove.
