= Corpusty and Saxthorpe railway station =

Former railway station in Norfolk, England

Coordinates: 52.826231°N 1.131924°E

Corpusty and Saxthorpe
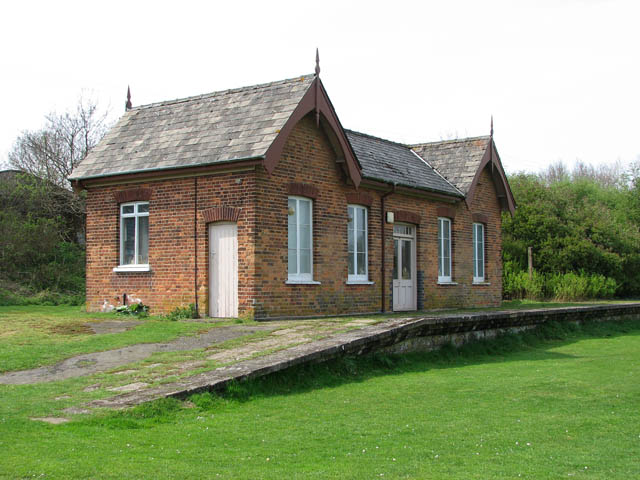
- The station building in 2009

General information
- Location: Corpusty, North Norfolk; England
- Grid reference: TG110300
- Platforms: 2

Other information
- Status: School use

History
- Original company: Eastern & Midlands Railway
- Pre-grouping: Midland and Great Northern Joint Railway
- Post-grouping: Midland and Great Northern Joint Railway; Eastern Region of British Railways

Key dates
- 5 April 1883: Opened
- 2 March 1959: Closed
Location

Corpusty and Saxthorpe railway station served the North Norfolk villages of Corpusty and Saxthorpe.

== History ==
It was opened by the Eastern & Midlands Railway on 5 April 1883, as a stop on their route between Melton Constable and Yarmouth Beach.

The station not only handled passenger traffic but a high volume of goods traffic, much of which was agricultural.

Often shortened to Corpusty station, it was also home to two different coal merchants during its operational life.

It was closed in 1959. In 2025, the station building was restored as a local community hub and small museum. Long-term plans for the building include adding a carriage to the station’s unique, 100m-long platform, where organisers hope to create a space where people can dine inside a train.

Preceding station	Disused railways	Following station
Melton Constable	Midland and Great Northern; Yarmouth Line	Bluestone
