= Dickebusch New Military Cemetery and Extension =

WWI CWGC cemetery in Ypres, Belgium

- Commonwealth War Graves Commission
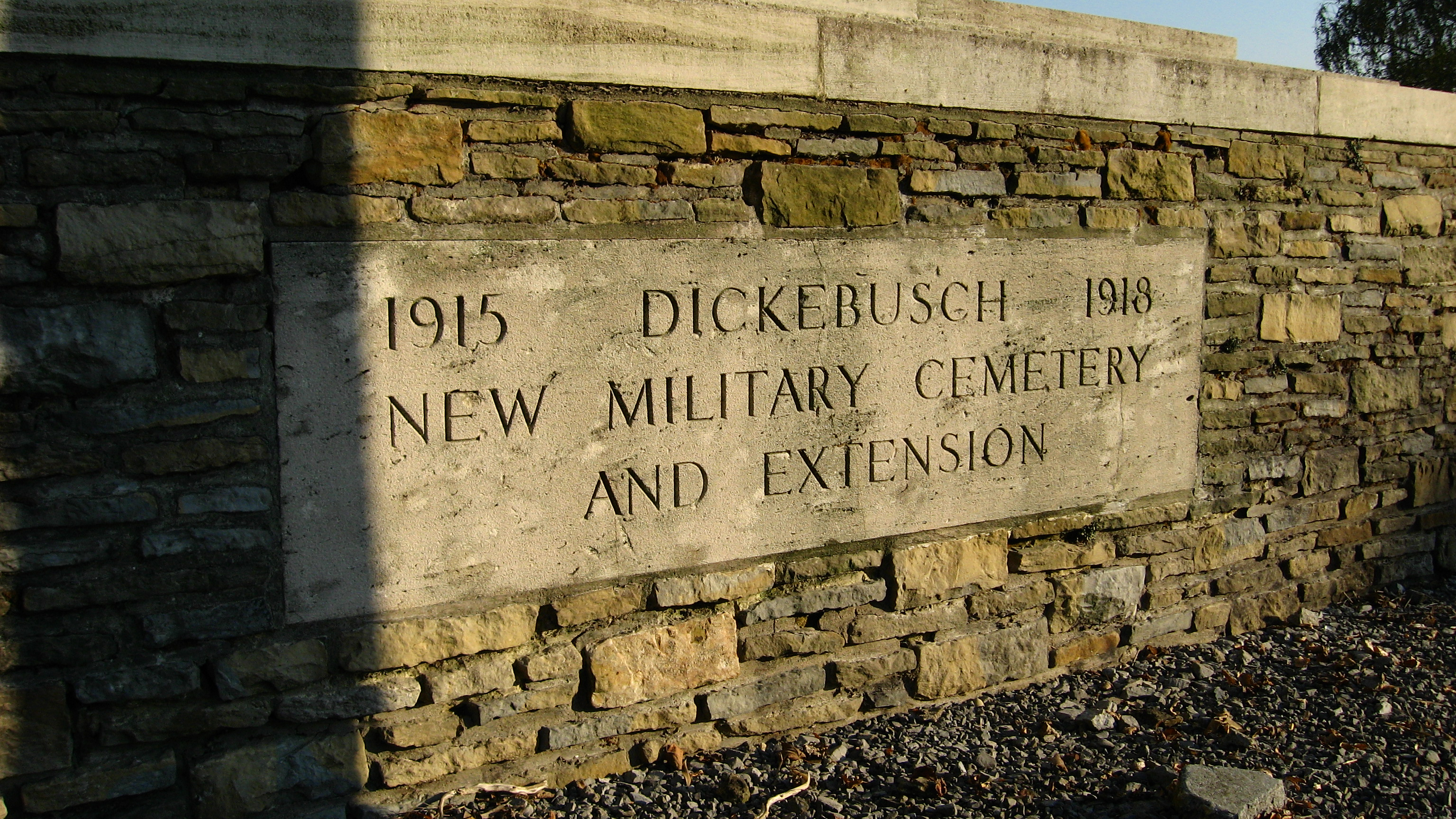
- Used for those deceased 1915–1918
- Established: 1915
- Location: 50°49′05″N 02°49′54″E near Dikkebus, West Flanders, Belgium
- Designed by: Sir Edwin Lutyens
- Total burials: 1,171
- Unknowns: 13

Burials by nation
- Allied Powers: (Cemetery/Extension): United Kingdom 529/520; Canada: 84/2; Australia: 11/24; South Africa: 0/1; New Zealand: 1/0

Burials by war
- World War I: 624/547
- Statistics source: WW1Cemeteries.com and CWGC

Dickebusch New Military Cemetery and Extension are Commonwealth War Graves Commission (CWGC) burial grounds for the dead of the First World War located in the Ypres Salient on the Western Front in Belgium.

The cemetery grounds were assigned to the United Kingdom in perpetuity by King Albert I of Belgium in recognition of the sacrifices made by the British Empire in the defence and liberation of Belgium during the war.

== Foundation ==
The main cemetery was founded in February 1915 by field ambulances and troops in the area after the closure of the Dickebusch Old Military Cemetery a short distance away.

The Extension – across the road from the cemetery – was established in May 1917, again for use by ambulance units and troops.

The cemetery was designed by Sir Edwin Lutyens.
