= Salle, Norfolk =

Village in Norfolk, England

Coordinates: 52°46′49″N 1°07′34″E

Salle
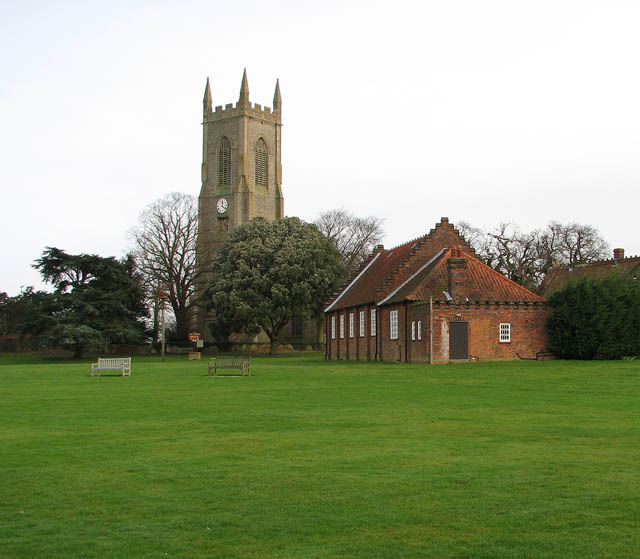
- Salle church, behind the cricket ground

- Location within Norfolk
- Area: 8.21 km^{2} (3.17 sq mi)
- Population: 50
  - Density: 6/km^{2} (16/sq mi)
- OS grid reference: TG109248
- Civil parish: Salle
- District: Broadland
- Shire county: Norfolk
- Region: East
- Country: England
- Sovereign state: United Kingdom
- Post town: NORWICH
- Postcode district: NR10
- Dialling code: 01603
- Police: Norfolk
- Fire: Norfolk
- Ambulance: East of England
- UK Parliament: Broadland and Fakenham

Salle (/ˈsɔːl/ SAWL) is a small village and civil parish in the Broadland district, in the county of Norfolk, England. 1.5 miles (2.4 km) to the south is the market town of Reepham.

The name, pronounced Saul, derives from "Sallow Wood" — sallow referring to willow in Norfolk dialect. It is sometimes written, now archaically, Sall. The parish was renamed from "Sall" to "Salle" on 18 October 1994.

The civil parish has an area of 8.21 square kilometres (3.17 sq mi) and in 2001 had a population of 50 in 21 households.

Salle is celebrated for its fine, huge late medieval church, which retains the lower part of its rood screen.

The Salle Park Estate owns much of the village and surrounding agricultural land.

== St Peter and St Paul's Church ==
The church, which dates from the first part of the 15th century, is an exceptionally complete Perpendicular building. It is huge for the size of the village – several lords of local manors, including the Boleyn family, vied with each other to fund the building of the church. There are many brasses, including to members of the Boleyn family.

The church retains some of its medieval stained glass in the east window and in the south transept south window, and there is a 15th-century pulpit. The font has a tall, extravagant Perpendicular style canopy, with a lifting crane sprung from the ringing gallery.

The 130-feet tower faced with Barnack stone and flint has been described as "the most perfectly composed of all late medieval Norfolk towers", and as "one of the first of the great East Anglian towers".

St Peter and St Paul's church was never collegiate, so it is peculiar that it has twenty-six 15th-century misericords. These are placed 13 on each side of the choir.

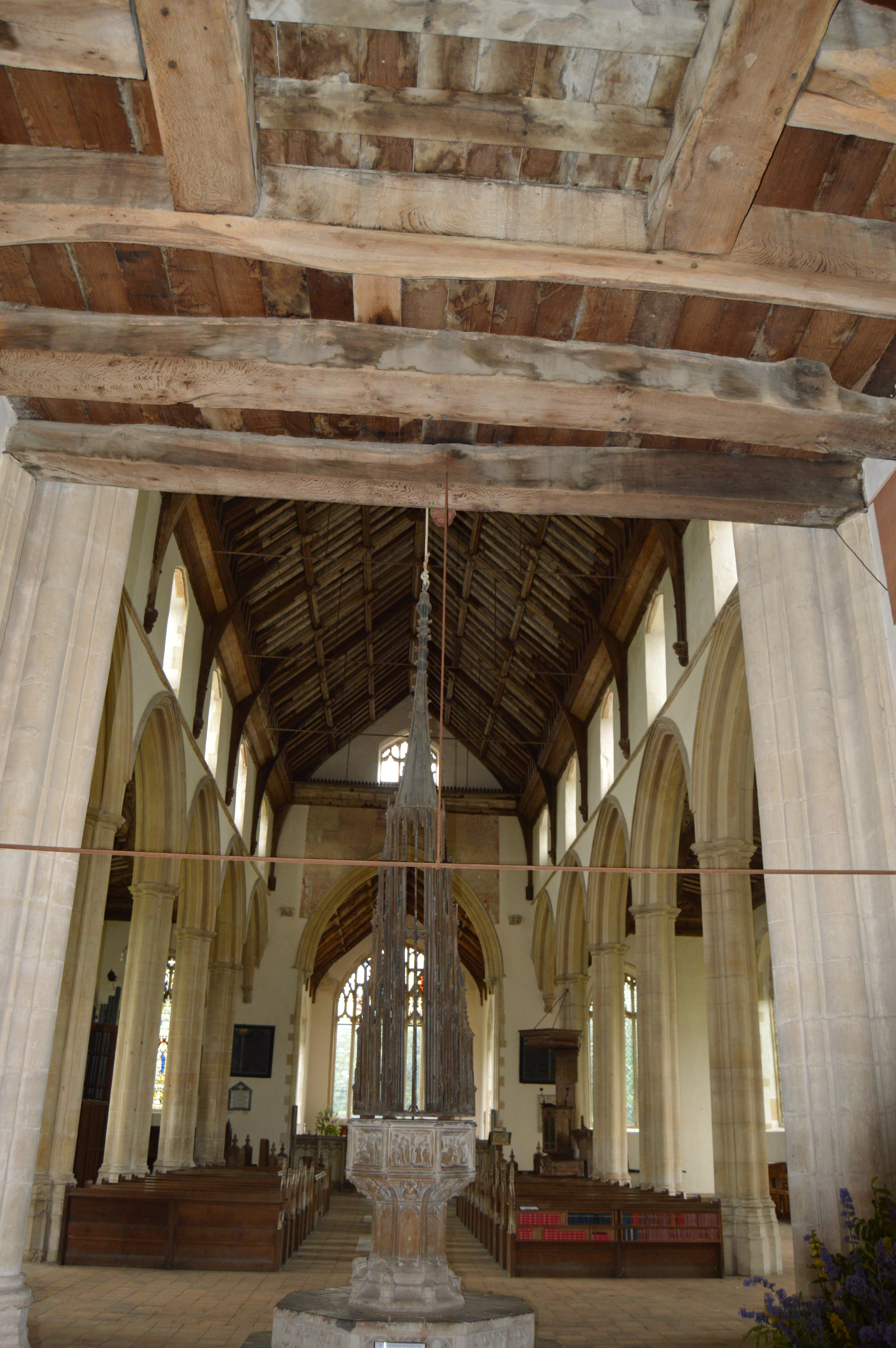
View showing the belfry timbers, the font cover and general view east

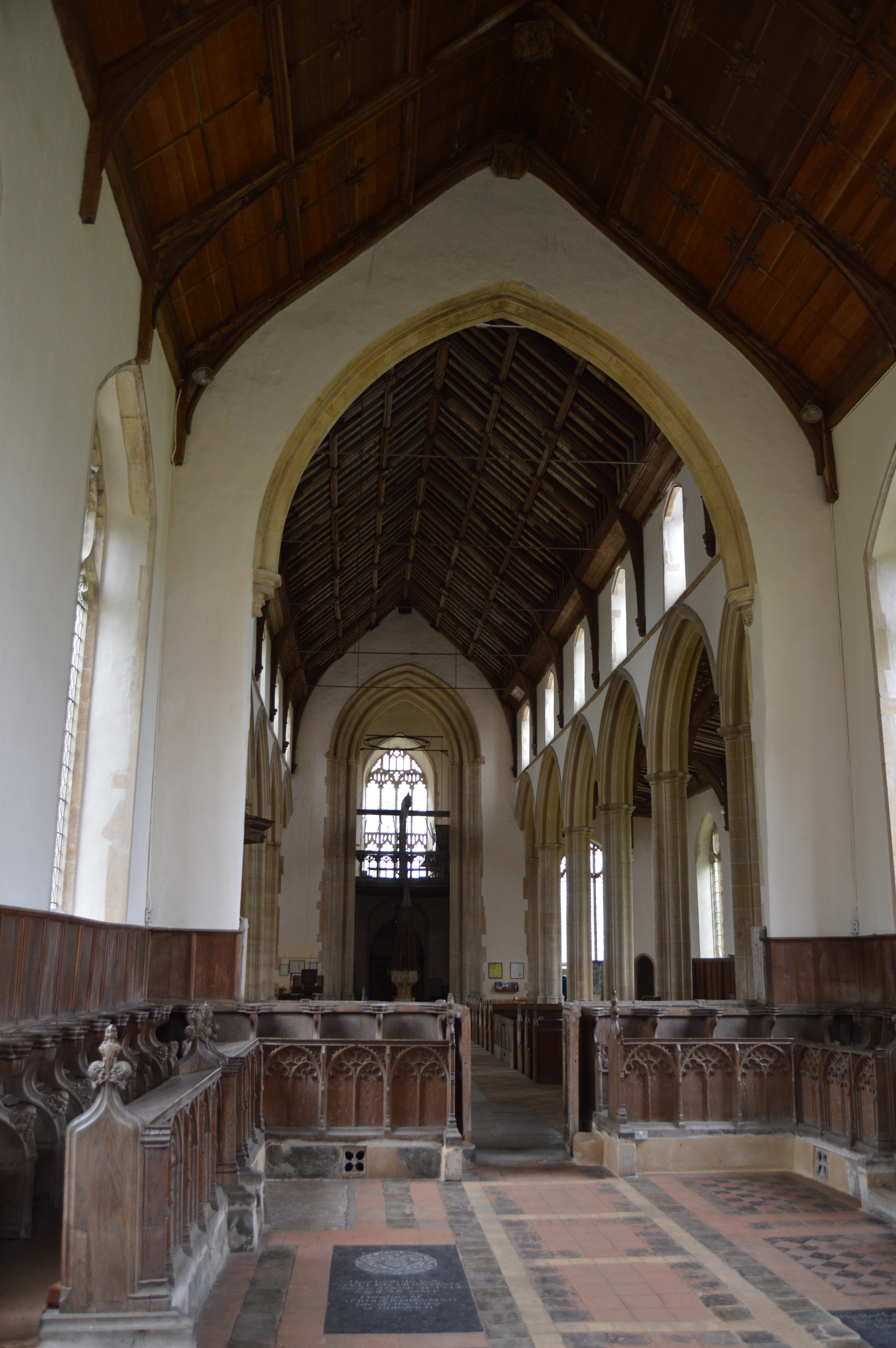
View west from sanctuary, showing misericords

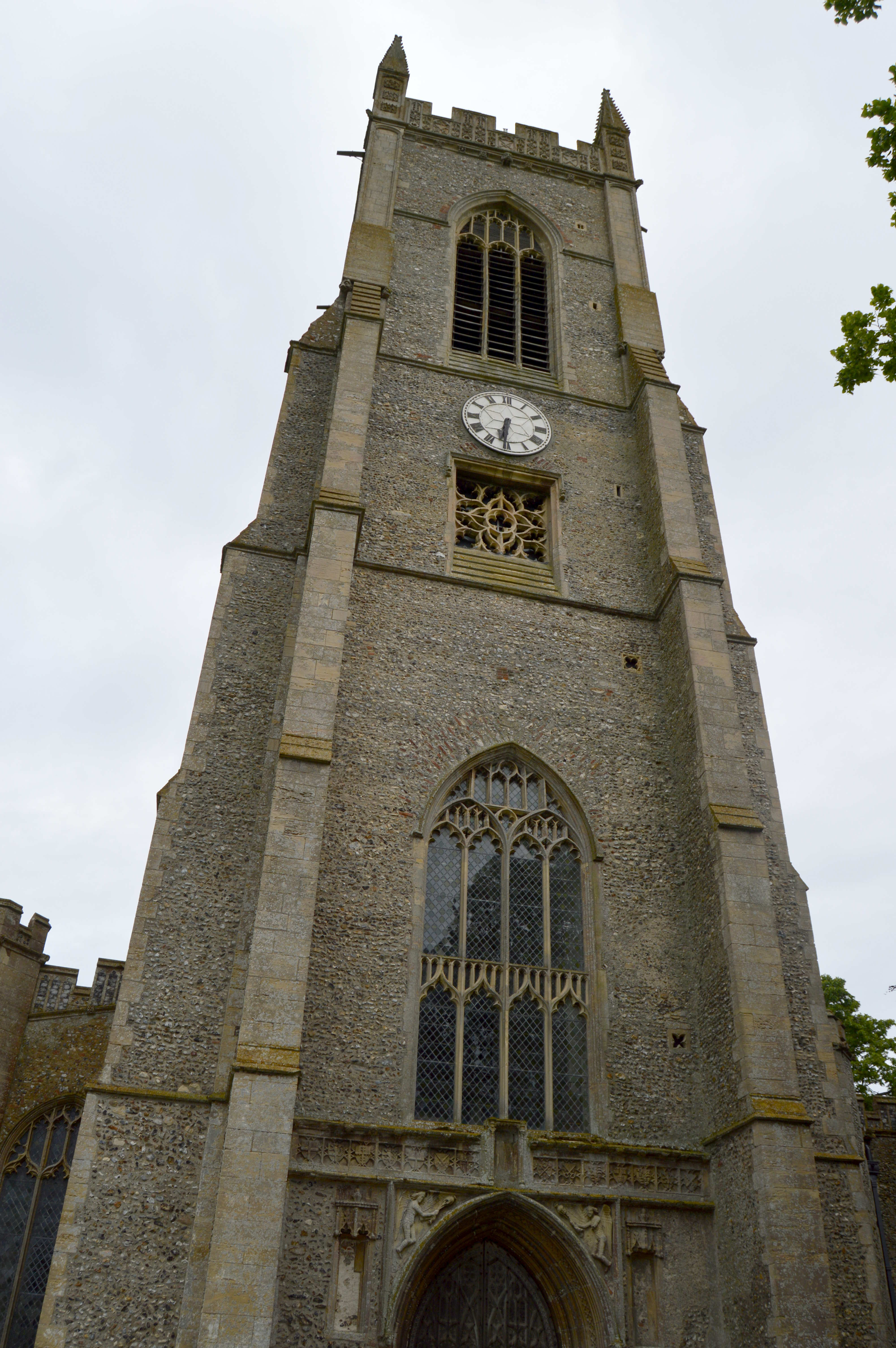
The fine Perpendicular-style tower, 130 feet tall

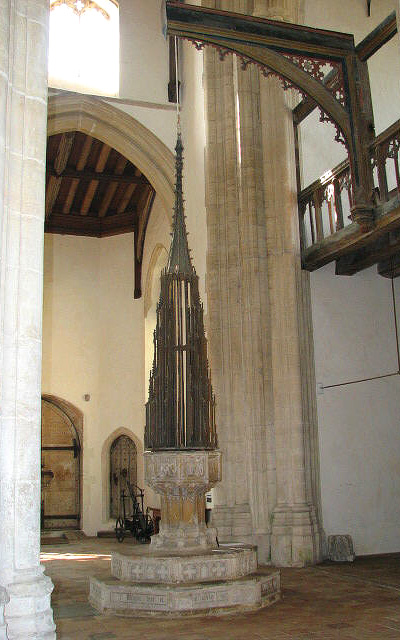
Font cover and crane

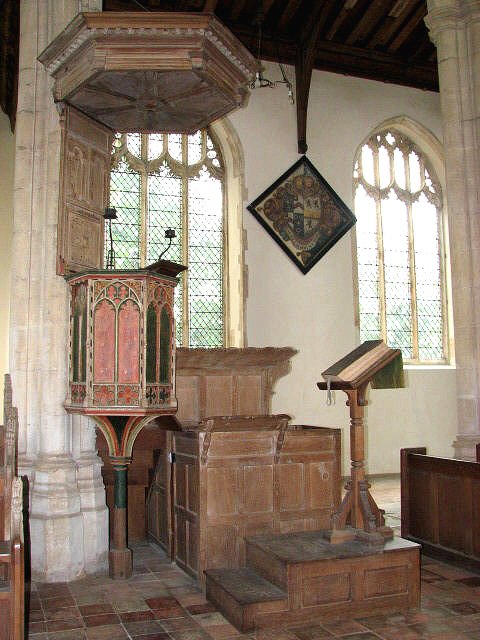
15th-century pulpit

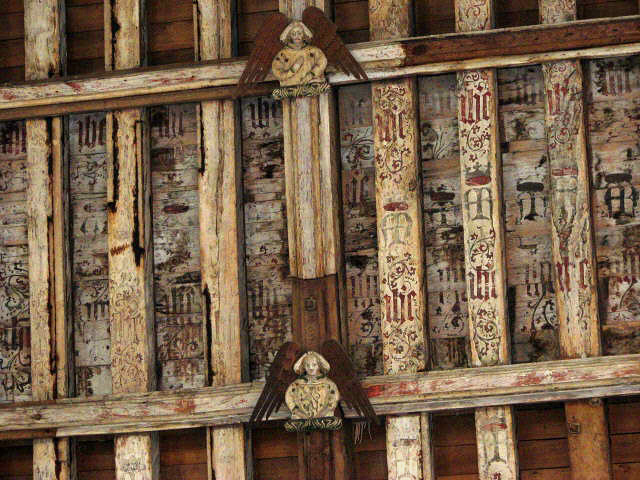
Roof detail

== Culture ==
The Reepham and Salle Cricket Club have their home ground by the church in Salle. The Lynton White Institute is a large grade II listed community hall located by the cricket ground, which is used by the cricket club and also for other local groups.

There is a small brewery in the parish — the All Day Brewing Company.

== History ==
Two places, or manors, in the parish are mentioned in the Domesday Book — Sall and Stinton. The latter is considered a lost or deserted settlement, which was in the vicinity of what is now Salle Place.

The parish formed part of the hundred of Eynesford.

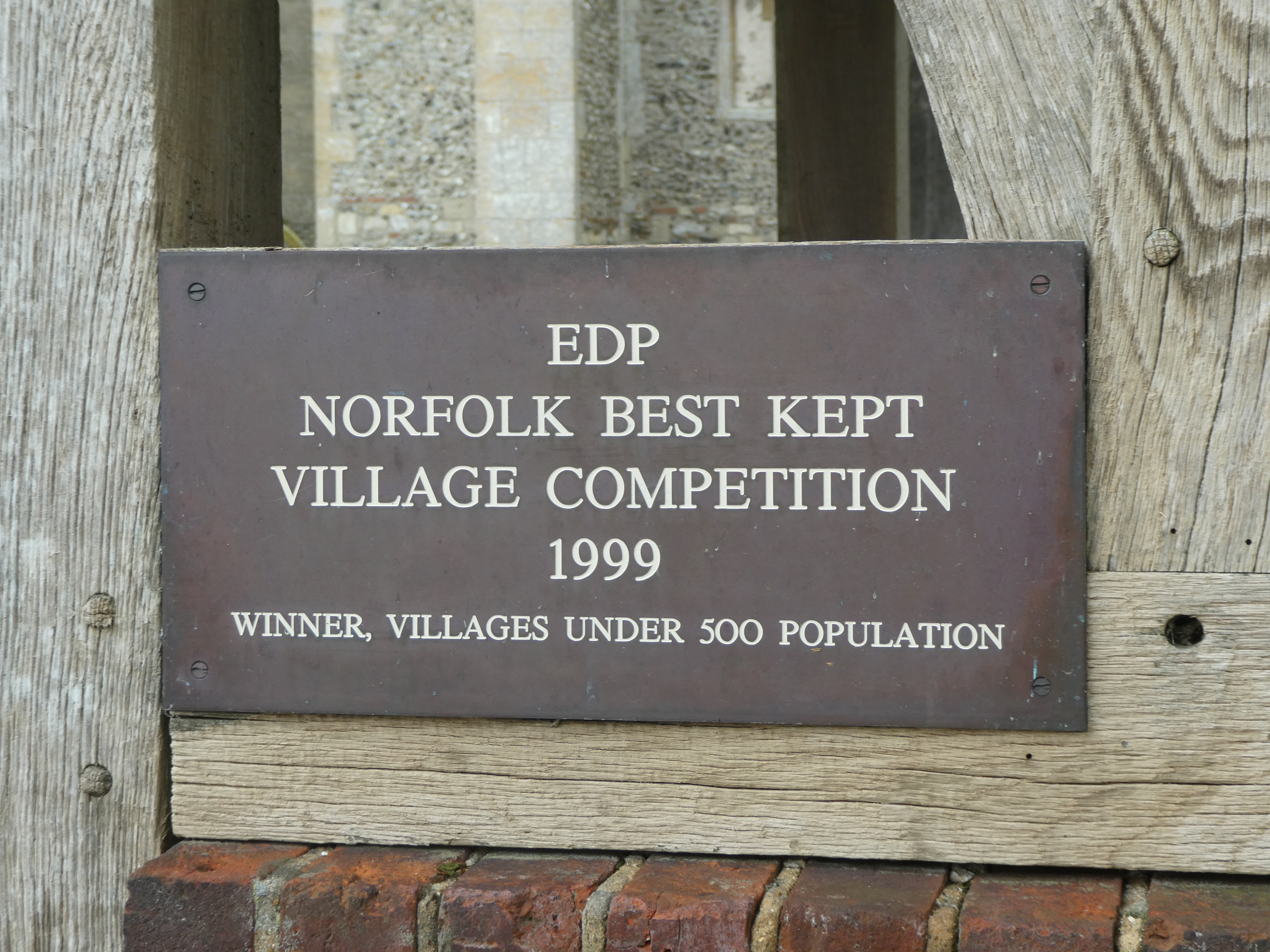
Best Kept Village competition commemorative plaque

In 1999, Salle was the winner of Norfolk's Best Kept Village competition for villages with a population of under 500 people.

== Geography ==
1.5 miles to the north is the village of Heydon. Another adjacent parish is Wood Dalling. The parish forms part of the ward of Eynesford, which returns a councillor to Broadland District Council. There is a parish meeting rather than a parish council, due to the small population.

There is a waymarked circular cycle trail along lanes around the parish and its immediate environs — the Salle Cycle Loop.
