= List of drainage windmills in Norfolk =

Extant (red) and former (blue) drainage windmills in Norfolk. Mills in the west of the county are not shown.
1 Ashby, 2 Barton Turf, 3 Belaugh, 4 Belton, 5 Buckenham, 6 Catfield, 7 Chedgrave (Six Mile House), 8 Chedgrave (Pettingell's), 9 Fleggburgh, 10 Fritton (Caldecott), 11 Fritton (Fritton Marshes), 12 Fritton (St Olaves), 13 Great Yarmouth (Ashtree Farm), 14 Great Yarmouth (Lockgate), 15 Haddiscoe, 16 Halvergate (Six Mile House), 17 Halvergate (Key's), 18 Halvergate (Stones), 19 Halvergate (Mutton's), 20 Halvergate (High's), 21 Halvergate (Howard's), 22 Hardley, 23 Hickling (Roland Green's), 24 Hickling (Stubb), 25 Horning (Neave's), 26 Horning (Hobb's), 27 Horning (Horning Ferry), 28 Horsey, 29 Hoveton, 30 Langley, 31 Limpenhoe, 32 Ludham (Boardman's), 33 Ludham (Clayrack), 34 Ludham (Womak Water), 35 Ludham (North), 36 Ludham (St Benet's Abbey), 37 Ludham (St Benet's Level), 38 Martham, 39 Mautby, 40 Norton Subcourse (Norton Marshes), 41 Norton Subcourse (Boyce's), 42 Oby, 43 Potter Heigham (High's), 44 Potter Heigham (Eelfleet Dyke), 45 Reedham (Cadge's), 46 Reedham (Polkey's), 47 Reedham (North), 48 Reedham (Reedham Ferry), 49 Reedham (Berney Arms), 50 Repps, 51 Runham (Five Mile House), 52 Runham (South), 53 Runham (North), 54 Sea Palling (Lambridge), 55 Smallburgh, 56 Stalham, 57 Starston, 58 Stokesby (Commission), 59 Stokesby (Old Hall), 60 Thurne, 61 Tunstall (Stracey Arms), 62 Tunstall (Tunstall Dyke tower), 63 Tunstall (Tunstall Dyke smock), 64 Upton (Palmer's), 65 Upton (Black), 66 Waxham, 67 West Somerton

This is a list of drainage windmills in the current ceremonial county English county of Norfolk. Some of the windmills in this area receive maintenance from the Norfolk Windmills Trust.

== Locations ==
=== A ===
Location	Name of mill and grid reference	Type	Maps	First mention or built	Last mention or demise	Photograph
Acle	Charlie Water's Mill; TG 413 110	Tower				
Acle	Palmer's Mill; TG 404 103	Hollow post			Dismantled 1976, rebuilt at Upton in 1978.	
Acle	TG 421 103	Trestle				
Acle	Marsh Farm Mill; TG 421 103	Tower		1890	1905; Norfolk Mills	
Ashby	Clippesby Mill; TG 409 128	Tower		1814		

=== B ===
Location	Name of mill and grid reference	Type	Maps	First mention or built	Last mention or demise	Photograph
Barton Turf	Turf Fen Windpump; TG 369 188	Tower		c. 1875	Norfolk Mills	
Barton Turf	TG 362 182	Tower				
Belaugh	Old Hall Mill; TG 293 175	Tower				
Belton	Black Mill; TG 467 035	Tower		c. 1830		
Buckenham	Buckenham Ferry Mill; TG 353 045	Tower			Norfolk Mills	
Burgh St Peter	Burgh Mill; TM 500 946	Tower			1920; Norfolk Mills	

=== C ===
Location	Name of mill and grid reference	Type	Maps	First mention or built	Last mention or demise	Photograph
Calthorpe	Randall's Mill; TG 410 264	Tower				
Caister	TG 512 102	Tower				
Caister	West Caister; TG 506 111	Hollow post				
Catfield	Barton Broad; TG 365 220	Tower				
Catfield	Swim Coots Mill; TG 4113 2122	Tower	1838	1838	Norfolk Mills	
Chedgrave	Six Mile House; TG 4521 0340	Tower		1870s	Norfolk Mills	
Chedgrave	Pettingell's Mill; Seven Mile House Mill; TG 4589 0163	Tower		C.1800	Norfolk Mills	
Chedgrave	Upper Seven Mile House Mill; TG 446 028	Tower				
Claxton	TG 364 051	Tower				

=== D - F ===
Location	Name of mill and grid reference	Type	Maps	First mention or built	Last mention or demise	Photograph
Dilham	TG 347 259	Trestle				
Eaton	TG 197 068			1884	1930; Norfolk Mills	
Fleggburgh	St Margaret's Mill; TG 418 119	Tower		c. 1747	Norfolk Mills	
Fritton	Caldecott Mill; TG 4642 0210	Tower			Norfolk Mills	
Fritton	Fritton Marshes; TM 450 998	Tower				
Fritton	St Olaves Mill; Priory Mill; TM 457 998	Trestle		1910	Norfolk Mills	
Fritton	Fritton Marshes; TM 450 998	Tower	1837	1837	Demolished 1895	
Fritton	Fritton Warren Mill; TG 453 008	Trestle		c. 1910	Demolished c. 1948	
Fritton	Bell Hill Mill; TG 465 021	Tower	1783	1783	Demolished 1844	
Fritton	TM 457 998	Smock	1884	1884	Demolished 1898	

=== G - H ===
Location	Name of mill and grid reference	Type	Maps	First mention or built	Last mention or demise	Photograph
Great Yarmouth	Ashtree Farm	Tower			Demolished by 1912	
Great Yarmouth	Ashtree Farm Mill; TG 507 095	Tower		1912	Norfolk Mills	
Great Yarmouth	Lockgate Mill; TG 480 071	Tower		1877	Norfolk Mills	
Haddiscoe	Toft Monks Mill; TG 448 009	Tower			Norfolk Mills	
Halvergate	Six Mile House Mill; Blake's Mill; Perry's Mill; TG 461 098	Tower			Tower restored 2021	
Halvergate	Key's Mill; TG 462 085	Tower				
Halvergate	Stone's Mill; Kerry's Mill; TG 441 056	Tower				
Halvergate	Mutton's Mill; TG 441 063	Tower			Norfolk Mills	
Halvergate	High's Mill; Gilbert's Mill; Lubbock's Mill; TG 457 072	Tower			Norfolk Mills	
Halvergate	South Walsham Mill; Howard's Mill; TG 462 072	Tower			Norfolk Mills	
Halvergate	Carter's Mill; TG 441 058	Tower				
Hardley	Hardley Marshes; TG 387 024	Tower		1874	Norfolk Mills	
Hellesdon	Marsh Mill; TG 192 117	Smock		c. 1828	Blown down June 1842; Norfolk Mills	
Hickling	Roland Green's Mill; TG 419 221	Tower		c. 1860	Norfolk Mills	
Hickling	Stubb Mill; TG 437 220	Tower		c. 1808	Norfolk Mills	
Hockwold	Lower Mill; TL 671 838			1829	1838; Norfolk Mills	
Hockwold	Upper Mill; TL 641 876			1829	1838; Norfolk Mills	
Hockwold	Redmoor Mill; TL 6460 8715	Smock	1797; 1824; 1826	1797	1826; Norfolk Mills	
Horning	Neave's Mill; Kettle's Mill; TG 365 176	Tower		1810	Norfolk Mills	
Horning	Hobb's Mill; TG 347 163	Trestle		Late 19th century	Restored 1983; English Heritage; Windmill World	
Horning	Horning Ferry; TG 345 166	Smock				
Horsey	Black Mill; TG 457 222	Tower		Early 18th century	Demolished 1912	
Horsey	Horsey Windpump; TG 457 222	Tower		1912	Norfolk Mills	
Hoveton	Dydall's Mill; Miller's Mill; TG 326 171	Tower				

=== I - L ===
Location	Name of mill and grid reference	Type	Maps	First mention or built	Last mention or demise	Photograph
Irstead	TG 358 196	Hollow post				
Langley	Langley Detached Mill; TG 466 045	Tower				
Limpenhoe	Limpenhoe Mill; TG 3946 0190	Tower		1831	Norfolk Mills	
Ludham	Boardman's Windmill; TG 370 192	Trestle				
Ludham	Clayrack Drainage Mill; TG 370 192	Hollow post		1987		
Ludham	Womack Water; TG 400 175	Tower			Norfolk Mills	
Ludham	North Mill, Ludham Bridge; TG 372 172	Tower			Norfolk Mills	
Ludham	South Mill, Ludham Bridge; TG374 169	Trestle			Standing 1930s	
Ludham	South Mill, Ludham Bridge; Beaumont's Mill; TG 374 170	Tower			Demolished 1960s Norfolk Mills	
Ludham	St Benet's Abbey Mill; TG 3803 1578	Tower	1749; 1765; 1775; 1797; 1826	c. 1735	Norfolk Mills	
Ludham	St Benet's Level Mill; TG 399 156	Tower		c. 1775	Norfolk Mills	
Ludham	TG 366 184					
Ludham	Ludham Staithe; Horsefen Mill; TG 408 176	Tower		c. 1800	Demolished 1950s-60s Norfolk Mills	
Ludham	TG 3969 1695	Tower			1939; Norfolk Mills	

=== M ===
Location	Name of mill and grid reference	Type	Maps	First mention or built	Last mention or demise	Photograph
Martham	Bracey's Mill; TG 442 192	Tower		1908	Norfolk Mills	
Mautby		Trestle		1783	1783; Norfolk mills	
Mautby	Marsh Mill; TG489 099	Tower			Norfolk mills	

=== N - O ===
Location	Name of mill and grid reference	Type	Maps	First mention or built	Last mention or demise	Photograph
Nordelph	Well Creek Mill; TF 561 009	Smock			Norfolk Mills	
Nordelph	Upwell Fen Mill; TF 561 003	Smock			Norfolk Mills	
Nordelph	Popham's Eau; Betty Mill; TF 5445 0085	Smock			Demolished 1920s Norfolk Mills	
Norton Subcourse	Norton Marshes; TG 403 011	Tower		1863	Norfolk Mills	
Norton Subcourse	Boyce's Mill; TG 402 008	Tower		1861		
Oby	Oby Mill; Wiseman's Mill'; TG 4092 1381	Tower	1797	1753	Norfolk Mills	

=== P - R ===
Location	Name of mill and grid reference	Type	Maps	First mention or built	Last mention or demise	Photograph
Potter Heigham	High's Mill; TG 429 190	Tower		c. 1875	Norfolk Mills	
Potter Heigham	Heigham Holmes Mill; Eelfleet Dyke Mill; TG 449 202	Tower				
Ranworth	Small Mill; TG 362 147	Tower				
Ranworth	Ranworth Marshes; TG 367 148	Hollow post			Demolished 1980s, re-erected at Ludham (Clayrack), 1987	
Reedham	Cadge's Mill; Batchie's Mill; Stimpson's Mill; TG 446 035	Tower				
Reedham	Polkey’s Mill; Reedham Hall Mill; South Mill; TG 444 035	Tower			Norfolk Mills	
Reedham	North Mill; TG 444 036	Tower			Norfolk Mills	
Reedham	Reedham Ferry (north); TG 409 017	Tower		1840	Norfolk Mills	
Reedham	Reedham Ferry (south); TG 408 014	Tower				
Reedham	TG 4652 0496	Tower	1797; 1826; 1834	1797	Demolished 1865; Norfolk Mills	
Reedham	Berney Arms Mill; High Mill; TG 4652 0496	Tower		1865	Norfolk Mills	
Reedham	Tuck's Mill; TG 459 043	Tower				
Repps	Repps Level; TG 418 179	Tower			Norfolk Mills	
Repps	Pug Street Mill; TG 414 174	Tower				
Rockland Broad	Long's Corner	Trestle			Norfolk Mills	
Runham	Five Mile House Mill; TG 478 098	Tower		1849	Norfolk Mills	
Runham	Perry's Mill; South Mill, Runham Swim; TG 472 099	Tower			Norfolk Mills	
Runham	Child's Mill; North Mill, Runham Swim; TG 470 100	Tower			Norfolk Mills	

=== S ===
Location	Name of mill and grid reference	Type	Maps	First mention or built	Last mention or demise	Photograph
Salters Lode		Smock			Norfolk Mills	
Sea Palling	Lambridge Mill; Lambrigg Mill; TG 432 252					
Sea Palling	Sea Palling Mill; TG 415 267					
Smallburgh	Wayford Bridge Mill; Dilham Dyke Mill; TG 3440 2480				1847; Norfolk Mills	
Smallburgh	Moy's Mill; TG 3536 2436	Tower		1900	1937; Norfolk Mills	
Smallburgh	Wayland Bridge drainage mill	Hollow post			Standing 1930s Norfolk Mills	
Stalham	Hunsett Mill; TG 364 239	Tower		1860	Norfolk Mills; Hunsett Mill	
Stalham	TG 358 248	Tower				
Starston	Starston Windpump; TM 232 843	Hollow post		c. 1850		
Stokesby	Commission Mill; TG 422 104	Tower			Norfolk Mills	
Stokesby	Old Hall Mill; Dack's Mill; TG 473 094	Tower			Norfolk Mills	
Stokesby	Calthorpe's Mill; TG 416 114	Tower				
South Walsham	Debbage's Mill; TG 385 151	Tower				

=== T - W ===
Location	Name of mill and grid reference	Type	Maps	First mention or built	Last mention or demise	Photograph
Thurne	Thurne Dyke Mill; Morse's Mill; TG 401 159	Tower		1820	Norfolk Mills	
Tunstall	Stracey Arms Windpump; TG 442 090	Tower		1820	Norfolk Mills	
Tunstall	Tunstall Dyke; TG 422 093	Tower			Norfolk Mills	
Tunstall	Acle Mill; TG 423 092	Smock			Norfolk Mills	
Upton	Palmer's Mill; TG 403 129	Hollow Post		1978	Norfolk Mills	
Upton	Black Mill; Tall Mill; TG 405 141	Tower		1800	Norfolk Mills	
Waxham	Brograve Mill; TG 448 236	Tower		1771	Norfolk Mills	
West Somerton	West Marsh Mill; TG 464 202	Tower		1858		
Wheatacre	Black Mill; TM 478 959	Tower				
Wiggenhall St Mary Magdalen	Wiggenhall Mill; TF 597 107	Smock				

== Maps ==
- 1749 Emanuel Bowen
- 1765 Corbridge
- 1775 Bowles
- 1783 Joseph Hodgkinson
- 1797 Faden
- 1826 Bryant
- 1834 Greenwood
- 1837 Ordnance Survey
- 1838 Ordnance Survey
- 1884 Ordnance Survey

== Notes ==
Mills in bold are still standing, known building dates are indicated in bold. Text in italics denotes indicates that the information is not confirmed, but is likely to be the case stated.

== Sources ==
Unless otherwise indicated, the source for all entries is Smith, Arthur C (1990). Drainage Windmills of the Norfolk Marshes. Stevenage: Stevenage Museum. ISBN 0-9515766-0-7. or the Norfolk Mills website per individual entries linked.
