= North Mill =

North Mill is the name of a number of mills.

== Windmills ==
- North Mill, Barney, a windmill in Norfolk
- North Mill, Brancaster, a windmill in Norfolk
- North Mill, Burnham on Crouch, a windmill in Essex
- North Mill, Caister, a windmill in Norfolk
- North Mill, Clavering, a windmill in Essex
- North Mill, Cottingham, a windmill in the East Riding of Yorkshire
- North Mill, Devizes Castle, Devizes, a windmill in Wiltshire
- North Mill, Halstead, a windmill in Essex
- North Mill, Ludham Bridge, a drainage mill in Norfolk
- North Mill, Middleton, a windmill in Norfolk
- North Mill, Pulham St Mary, a windmill in Norfolk
- North Mill, Radwinter, a windmill in Essex
- North Mill, Reedham, a drinage mill in Norfolk
- North Mill, Reedham Ferry, a drainage mill in Norfolk
- North Mill, Rickinghall Inferior, a windmill in Suffolk
- North Mill, Ringstead, a windmill in Norfolk
- North Mill, Runham, a drainage mill in Norfolk
- North Mill, Westfield, a windmill in East Sussex
- North Mill, Whissonsett, a windmill in Norfolk
- North Mill, Wymondham, a windmill in Norfolk
- Navarino North Mill, Worthing, a windmill in West Sussex

== Watermills ==
- North Mill, Belper, a cotton mill on the River Derwent, Derbyshire
- North Mill, Leeds, a watermill on the River Len, Kent
