= South Mill =

South Mill is the name of a number of mills

== Windmills ==
United Kingdom

- South Mill, Barney, a windmill in Norfolk
- South Mill, Bishop Burton, a windmill in the East Riding of Yorkshire
- South Mill, Brancaster, a windmill in Norfolk
- South Mill, Burnham on Crouch, a windmill in Essex
- South Mill, Caister, a windmill in Norfolk
- South Mill, Clavering, a windmill in Essex
- South Mill, Devizes Castle, Devizes, a windmill in Wiltshire
- South Mill, Easton, a windmill in Dorset
- South Mill, Instow, a windmill in Devon
- South Mill, Ludham Bridge, a trestle mill in Norfolk
- South Mill, Ludham Bridge, a tower mill in Norfolk
- South Mill, Middleton, a windmill in Norfolk
- South Mill, Pulham St Mary, a windmill in Norfolk
- South Mill, Reedham, a drainage mill in Norfolk
- South Mill, Ringstead, a windmill in Norfolk
- South Mill, Runham, a drainage mill in Norfolk
- South Mill, Tengdrin, a windmill in Essex
- South Mill, Wethersfield, a windmill in Essex
- South Mill, Whissonsett a windmill in Norfolk
- South Mill, Wiveton, a windmill in Norfolk
- Navarino South Mill, Worthing, a windmill in West Sussex

United States

- South Mill, Boston, a windmill in Massachusetts
- South Mill, Dennis, a windmill in Massachusetts
