= Red Mill =

Red Mill may refer to:

- Red Mill (snack food manufacturer), a British manufacturer
- Bob's Red Mill, an American food brand
- The Red Mill, a Broadway operetta which premiered in 1906
- The Red Mill (film), a 1927 American adaptation of the operetta
- Red Mill, New Jersey, United States, an unincorporated community
- Red Mill Burgers, a restaurant in Seattle, Washington, United States
- Red Mill Farm, an historic farming district in New York, United States
- Red Mill Commons, a shopping center in Virginia, United States
- Red Mills Trial Hurdle, a race held in Ireland
- Red Mill (Clinton, New Jersey), United States, a grist mill and historic site
  - Red Mill Museum Village, open-air museum including Clinton's Red Mill
- Reedham Ferry Drainage Mill, or Red Mill, a former drainage mill in Norfolk, England, now a privately owned holiday home
- Langley Detached Windmill, or Red Mill, a former drainage mill in Norfolk, England, now a privately owned holiday home

== See also ==
- Blue Mill (disambiguation)
- Black Mill
- White Mill
