= Redmill =

Redmill may refer to:

- Robert Redmill (c. 1765 – 1819), British naval officer
- HMS Redmill, more than one ship of the British Royal Navy

== See also ==
- Red Mill (disambiguation)
