= Brograve Mill =

Grade II listed windmill in the United kingdom

Brograve Drainage Windmill
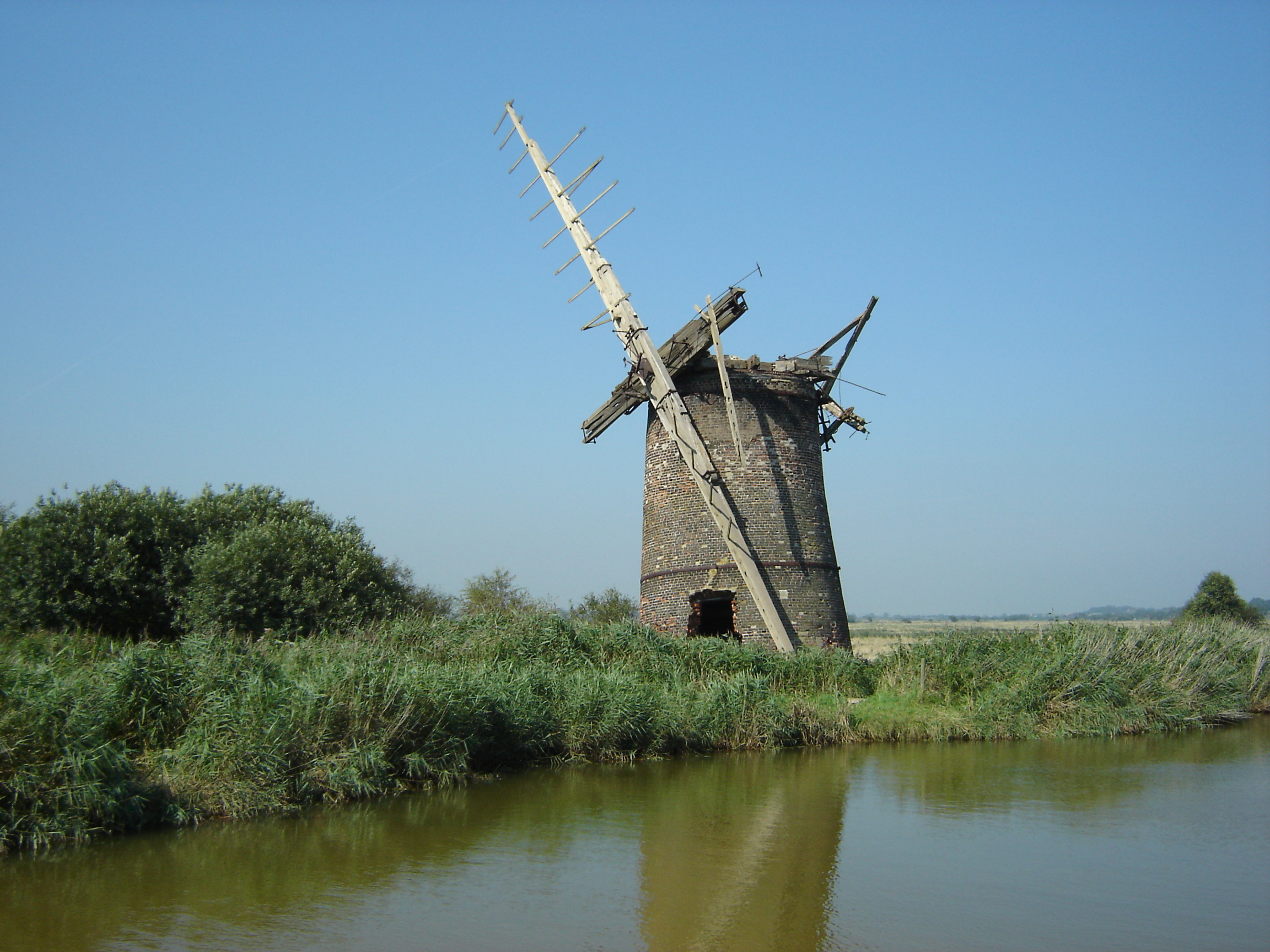
- Brograve Mill as it looks today
- Interactive map of Brograve Drainage Windmill

Origin
- Mill location: Sea Palling, North Norfolk, East of England, Norfolk, England
- Coordinates: 52.75361°N 1.62621°E
- Year built: 1771

Brograve Mill is a windpump located on Brograve level in the parish of Sea Palling within the Norfolk Broads National Park, United Kingdom. It can be found at grid reference TG448235 and is approximately 1 mile north of Horsey Mere. The mill is a Grade II listed building.

== History ==
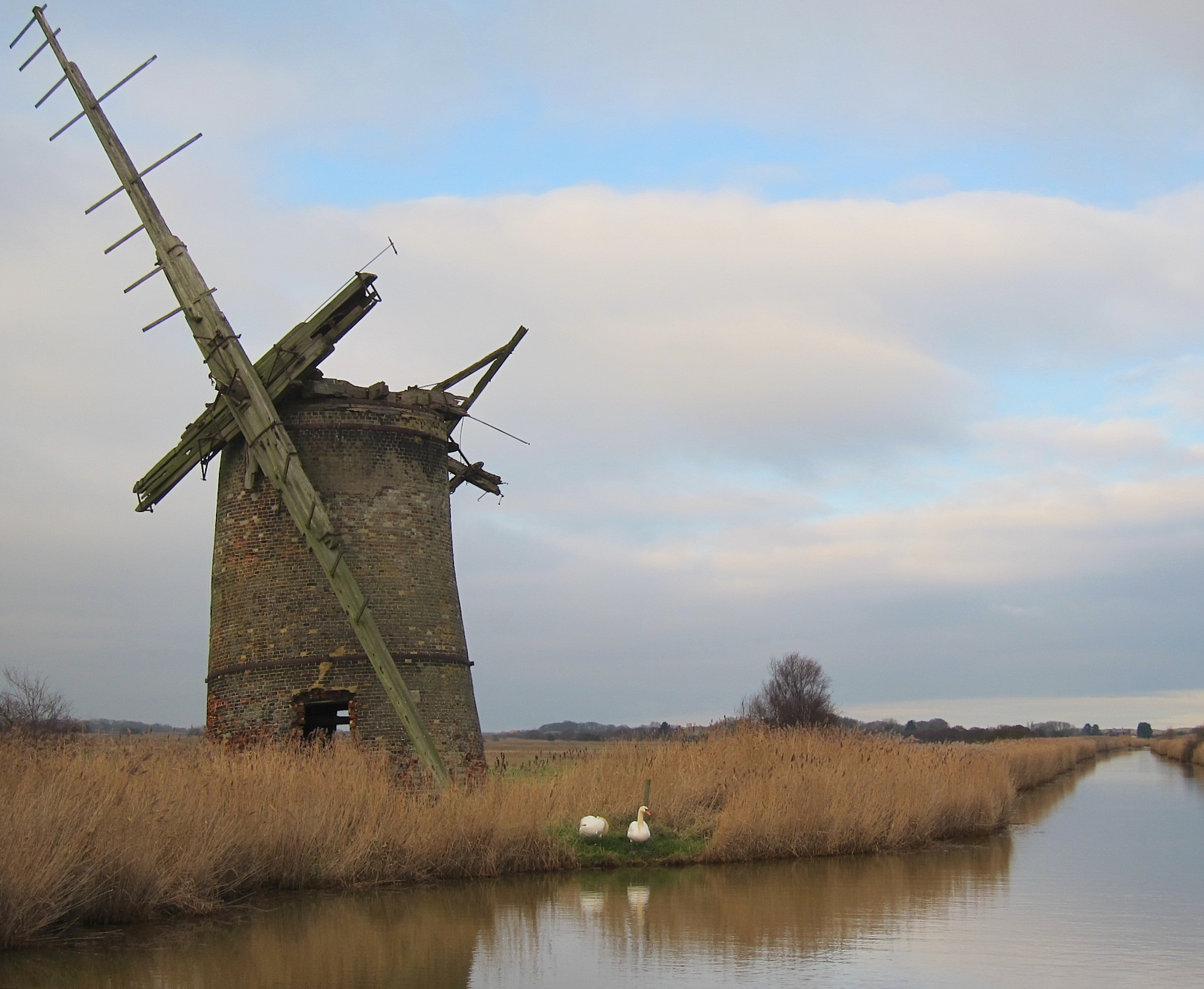
Mill on Waxham New Cut: view due north, 2.5 km to dune levee at North Sea, Jan. 2012

The Brograve windmill water pump is of red brick construction, now lying in an extremely dilapidated and unsafe state. Built in 1771 by Sir Berney Brograve, 1st Baronet (1726–1797), it is thought to have last worked around 1930. The mill had an 8-bladed windmill fantail, with a boat-shaped cap carrying two pairs of patent shuttered sails, powering an internal turbine pump. Its purpose was to drain the Brograve levels into the man-made Waxham New Cut. It is one of two mills on this water course, the other being Lambridge Mill (also derelict), located about 1 mile south of Sea Palling.

== Today ==
Only two stocks and two stubs of the original sails remain. The mill has a very westward lean to it, inspiring the myth that a furious Devil tried to foil Brograve's drainage efforts by blowing it down. Separated by the Cut, Brograve Mill cannot be directly reached on foot. However, it can be seen very closely from various eastern perspectives by following a path along the Waxham New Cut from Horsey Mere (see illus.), where there is also a farm track on private property owned by Brograve Farm. The only direct access the mill would be by boat along the Waxham New Cut, however entering the structure is strongly discouraged as it is in a very unsafe state.
