= High's Mill, Halvergate =

Windmill in Halvergate, Norfolk, England

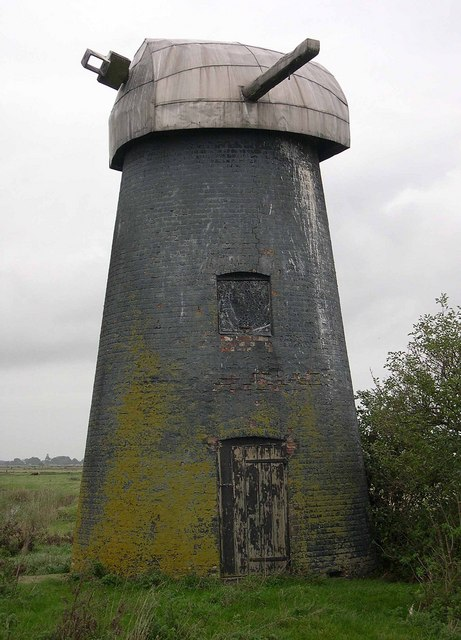
- High's Mill, October 2006
- Interactive map of High's Mill, Halvergate

Origin
- Mill name: High's Mill; Gilbert's Mill; Lubbock's Mill
- Mill location: Halvergate, Norfolk, United Kingdom
- Grid reference: TG 4573 0716
- Coordinates: 52°36′27″N 1°37′41″E
- Operator: Norfolk Windmills Trust
- Year built: Early 19th Century

Information
- Purpose: Drainage mill
- Type: Tower mill
- Storeys: Two storeys
- No. of sails: Four
- Winding: Tailpole
- Type of pump: Scoopwheel

High's, Gilbert's or Lubbock's Mill is a Grade II listed tower mill in Halvergate, Norfolk, United Kingdom. A drainage mill, it has been conserved.

== History ==
High's Mill was built in the early 19th Century. Arthur C. Smith surveyed the mill on 6 May 1974. He described it as a derelict tower mill with windshaft, brake wheel, machinery and scoopwheel. The mill was listed Grade II on 26 February 1987. Smith surveyed the mill again on 5 July 1988. He noted that it had been conserved, having been fitted with an aluminium cap. The mill was then in the ownership of the Norfolk Windmills Trust. In 2023, the mill tower was given a fresh coat of tar.

== Description ==
High's Mill is a two storey tower mill. It had a boat shape cap. Four sails were carried in a cast iron windshaft, which carries a wooded clasp arm brake wheel. This drove a cast iron wallower at the top of the wooden upright shaft. The crown wheel, at the bottom of the upright shaft is also of cast iron. It drives a cast iron pit wheel with wooden teeth. This drove a scoopwheel. The mill was winded by a tailpole.
