= Turf Fen Windpump =

Windmill in Barton Turf, Norfolk, England

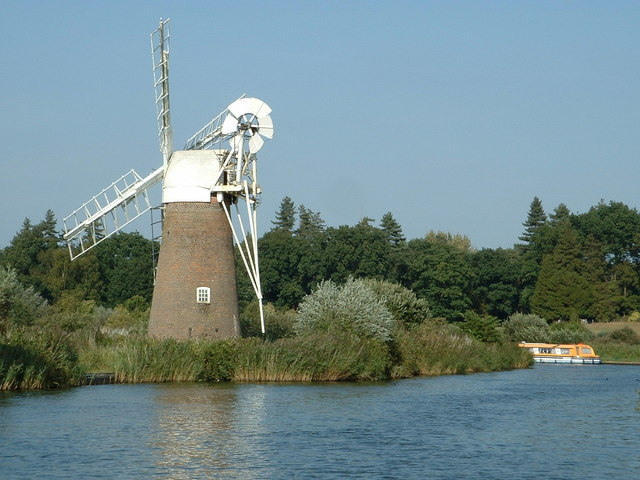
- Turf Fen Windpump, September 2003
- Interactive map of Turf Fen Windpump

Origin
- Mill name: Turf Fen Windpump
- Mill location: Barton Turf, Norfolk, United Kingdom
- Grid reference: TG 369 188
- Coordinates: 52°42′55″N 1°30′25″E
- Operator: Norfolk Windmills Trust
- Year built: C.1875

Information
- Purpose: Drainage mill
- Type: Tower mill
- Storeys: Two storeys
- No. of sails: Four
- Type of sails: Patent sails
- Windshaft: Cast iron
- Winding: Fantail
- Fantail blades: Six
- Type of pump: Two scoopwheels

Turf Fen Windpump is a Grade II* listed tower mill in Barton Turf, Norfolk, United Kingdom. Built in the 1870s, it is one of two windpumps in the Norfolk Broads that has two scoopwheels. The mill is under restoration as of March 2026.

== History ==
Turf Fen Windpump was built c. 1875 by William Rust, millwright, Horning, Norfolk. It is unusual in having two scoopwheels. The only other windpump in the Norfolk Broads with this feature is Hunsett Mill. The mill was working until the 1940s, then became derelict.

By 1955, the mill was missing its sails and fantail. The cap had gone by May 1973, the cap frame remaining and the windshaft retaining the stocks of the sails. In 1976, the mill passed to the Norfolk Windmills Trust. Restoration by John Lawn, millwright of Caston, Norfolk took place between 1984 and 1987. The mill was listed Grade II* on 12 May 1987. A new brake wheel was installed in 1990. New paddles were fitted to the scoopwheels in 2007. The sails were removed in 2016 as they were rotten. In July 2022, Historic England added the mill to its Heritage at Risk Register. In January 2024, plans were announced for the restoration of the mill. As of March 2026, it is under restoration.

== Description ==
Turf Fen Windpump is a tower mill. The tower is about 31 feet (9.4 m) tall. It has only two floors. It has a boat shape cap. Four double Patent sails are carried on a cast iron windshaft, which carries a wooden clasp arm brake wheel. The mill is winded by a six-bladed fantail. Two scoop wheels are driven. These can be driven independently of each other, and with a choice of high or low gear.
