= Hardley Marshes Windpump =

Windmill in Norfolk, England

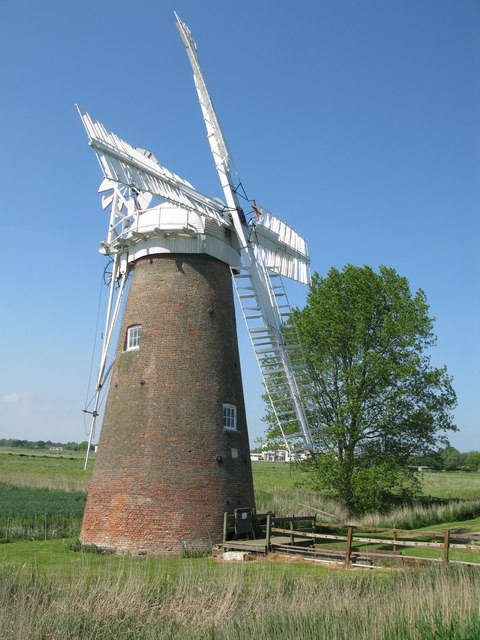
- Hardley Marshes Windpump, May 2017
- Interactive map of Hardley Marshes Windpump

Origin
- Mill name: Hardley Marshes Windpump
- Mill location: Hardley, Norfolk, United Kingdom
- Grid reference: TG3877 0241
- Coordinates: 52°34′01″N 1°31′18″E
- Year built: 1874

Information
- Purpose: Drainage mill
- Type: Tower mill
- Storeys: Four storeys
- No. of sails: Four
- Type of sails: Patent sails
- Windshaft: Cast iron
- Winding: Fantail
- Fantail blades: Eight
- Type of pump: Appold turbine
- Other information: Website

Hardley Windpump is a Grade II listed tower mill at Hardley, Norfolk, United Kingdom. A drainage mill built in 1874, it was restored in the 2000s and is open to the public.

== History ==
Hardley Windpump was built in 1874. It was working in September 1930. Arthur C. Smith surveyed the mill on 15 May 1976. He described it as a derelict tower mill with a collapsed cap. The mill had its windshaft and brake wheel, but no sails. The fanstage remained. The mills was listed Grade II on 23 September 1987. Smith surveyed the mill again on 21 May 1989. At that time, he stated that the windshaft was missing, but a turbine pump was located in the mill. A lease to the Norfolk Windmills Trust was pending.

The mill was restored in the 2000s. A temporary flat roof had been fitted to the tower by 2006. The new cap had been fitted by April 2009. The mill is open to the public (see website).

== Description ==
Hardley Windpump is a four storey tower mill. The tower is about 43 feet (13 m) high. It has a boat shape cap with petticoat. Four double Patent sails are carried on a cast iron windshaft, which also carries a cast iron brake wheel with wooden cogs. This drives a cast iron wallower at the top of the wooden upright shaft. At the bottom of the upright shaft, a cast iron great spur wheel with wooden teeth drives an Appold Turbine.
