= Five Mile House Mill, Runham =

Windmill in Norfolk, England

- Five Mile House mill, January 2011
- Interactive map of Five Mile House Mill, Runham

Origin
- Mill name: Five Mile House Mill
- Mill location: Runham, Norfolk, United Kingdom
- Grid reference: TG 4778 0984
- Coordinates: 52°37′47″N 1°39′34″E
- Operator: Norfolk Windmills Trust
- Year built: 1849

Information
- Purpose: Drainage mill
- Type: Tower mill
- Storeys: Four storeys
- No. of sails: Four
- Windshaft: Cast iron
- Winding: Fantail
- Type of pump: Scoopwheel

Five Mile House Mill is a Grade II listed tower mill at Runham, Norfolk. Built in 1849, it has been conserved.

== History ==
Five Mile House Mill was built in 1849 by R. & J. Stolworthy, millwrights of Great Yarmouth. Arthur C. Smith surveyed the mill on 10 July 1973. He recorded that the mill was derelict without its cap or sails, but retaining the fanstage and its internal machinery. Smith surveyed the mill again on 14 July 1987. By then, the mill was in the care of the Norfolk Windmills Trust. The mill had then been conserved with an aluminium cap fitted. The mill was listed Grade II on 15 July 1988.

== Description ==
Five Mile House Mill is a four storey tower mill. It had four sails carried on a cast iron windshaft. The mill was winded by a fantail. The windshaft carries a cast iron brake wheel. This drove a cast iron wallower at the top of the wooden upright shaft. At the bottom of the upright shaft, a cast iron crown wheel drove a pit wheel, which was on the shaft that carried the scoopwheel.
