= Cadge's Mill, Reedham =

Windmill in Reedham, Norfolk, England

- Polkey's Mill (left) and Cadge's Mill, May 2008
- Interactive map of Cadge's Mill, Reedham

Origin
- Mill name: Cadge's Mill
- Mill location: Reedham, Norfolk, United Kingdom
- Grid reference: TG 4457 0354
- Coordinates: 52°34′29″N 1°36′29″E
- Year built: 1870

Information
- Purpose: Drainage mill
- Type: Tower mill
- Storeys: Four storeys
- No. of sails: Four
- Type of sails: Patent sails
- Windshaft: Cast iron
- Winding: Fantail
- Fantail blades: Eight
- Auxiliary power: Steam engine
- Type of pump: Scoopwheel
- Scoopwheel diameter: 18 feet 0 inches (5.49 m)

Cadge's, Batchie's or Stimpson's Mill is a Grade II listed tower mill at Reedham, Norfolk. Built in 1870, it worked until 1941. It has been conserved.

== History ==
Cadge's Mill was built in 1870. It was designed by William Thorold of Long Stratton, Norfolk and built by Thomas Smithdale, millwright, Norwich. A steam engine was installed in 1880 as auxiliary power. In 1914, the mill drained 900 acres (360 ha). In 1932, a court case was brought by a farmer refusing to pay £8 in drainage rates as he claimed that the marshes were not being drained and he could not put his cattle on them. A counter claim was made that the farmer had not kept the drains in good order. However, the judge found in favour of the farmer. The mill worked until 1941, when it was replaced by a diesel-powered pump. The sails and fantail were removed; the sails were re-used on another mill. The mill had been stripped of its internal machinery by the 1960s. The steam engine was scrapped c.1965.

Arthur C. Smith surveyed the mill on 10 June 1974. He described the mill as derelict without its cap or sails, but retaining the windshaft and brakewheel, and the internal scoopwheel. The mill was listed Grade II on 30 April 1984. In 1985, the derelict mill was renovated so that it could house a transformer for a nearby electrically powered drainage pump. Caston millwright John Lawn repaired the tower and renewed the floors. A temporary roof was fitted to the tower, ready for a new cap to be made. However, it would be nearly 20 years before this was done. Millwright Nigel Pargeter started work on the mill in 2002. A new cap was fitted in 2006.

== Description ==
Cadge's Mill is a four storey tower mill. The tower is about 38 feet (12 m) tall, with an outside diameter of 24 feet 0 inches (7.32 m) at the base. It has a boat shape cap with petticoat. Four double Patent sails were carried on a cast iron windshaft, which remains. The sails were about 10 feet (3.0 m) wide and had a span of about 70 feet (21 m). The cap was winded by an eight-bladed fantail. The mill drove an internal scoopwheel 18 feet 0 inches (5.49 m) diameter, and 12 inches (305 mm) wide.
