= Fritton Marshes Windpump =

Windmill in Fritton, Norfolk, England

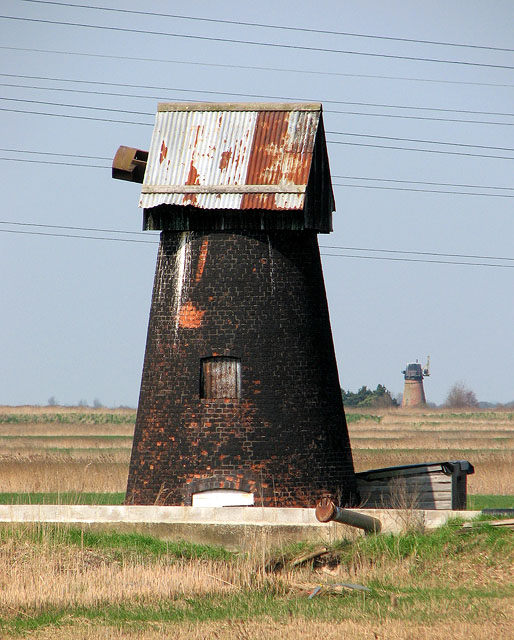
- Fritton Marshes Windpump, April 2010. Toft Monks Windpump is in the background.
- Interactive map of Fritton Marshes Windpump

Origin
- Mill name: Fritton Marshes Windpump
- Mill location: Fritton, Norfolk, United Kingdom
- Grid reference: TM 4502 9978
- Coordinates: 52°32′28″N 1°36′45″E

Information
- Purpose: Drainage mill
- Type: Tower mill
- Storeys: Three storeys
- No. of sails: Four
- Windshaft: Cast iron
- Auxiliary power: Traction engine
- Type of pump: Scoopwheel

Fritton Marshes Windpump, or Farman's Mill is a Grade II listed tower mill at Fritton, Norfolk, United Kingdom. A drainage mill, it has been conserved with some machinery.

== History ==
Fritton Marshes Windpump was surveyed by Arthur C. Smith on 5 May 1975. He described it as a derelict tower mill without cap or sails, but retaining the windshaft, brake wheel and internal machinery.. It was listed Grade II on 15 July 1988. The mill's condition had not changed when Smith surveyed the mill again on 16 May 1989. By February 2009, a pitched roof of corrugated iron had been placed on the tower.

== Description ==
Fritton Marshes Mill is a tower mill. The tower is 20 feet 6 inches (6.25 m) tall. It had a boat shape cap. Four sails were carried in a cast iron windshaft, which carried a cast iron brake wheel (photographs show that the windshaft is bored, so Patent sails may have been fitted). This drove a cast iron wallower at the top of the wooden upright shaft. The wooden clasp arm pit wheel is 7 feet 4 inches (2.24 m) diameter. The mill drove a scoopwheel. A traction engine was used as auxiliary power.
