= Key's Mill, Halvergate =

Windmill in Halvergate, Norfolk, England

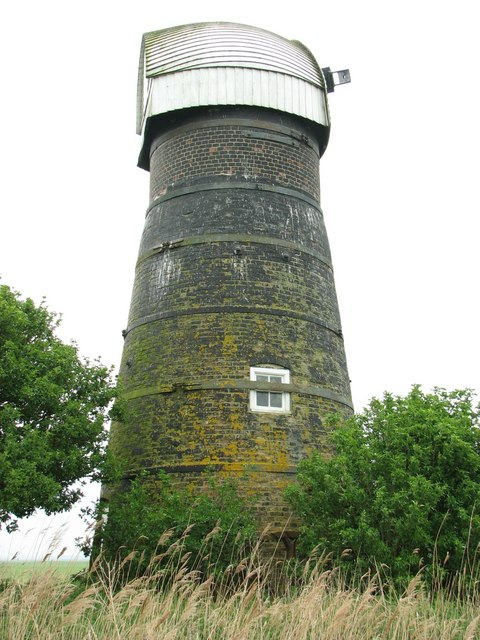
- Key's Mill, April 2011
- Interactive map of Key's Mill, Halvergate

Origin
- Mill name: Keys Mill, Kerrison's Level Mill
- Mill location: Halvergate, Norfolk, United Kingdom
- Grid reference: TG 4622 0853
- Coordinates: 52°37′07″N 1°38′10″E
- Operator: Norfolk Windmills Trust
- Year built: 1700s

Information
- Purpose: Drainage mill
- Type: Tower mill
- Storeys: Four storeys
- No. of sails: Four
- Type of sails: Patent sails
- Windshaft: Cast iron
- Winding: Fantail
- Type of pump: Scoopwheel
- Scoopwheel diameter: 17 feet 3 inches (5.26 m)

Keys, or Kerrison's Level Mill, is a Grade II listed tower mill at Halvergate, Norfolk, United Kingdom. Built in the 1700s, it was raised in 1895. The mill tower has been conserved.

== History ==
Keys mill was built in the 1700s. As built, the mill was a three storey tower mill. It had four Common sails and was winded by a tailpole. In 1895, the mill was rebuilt by William England, millwright of Ludham, Norfolk. The mill was raised by a storey. Patent sails and a fantail were added. Arthur C. Smith surveyed the mill on 17 September 1973 and 26 May 1974. He described the mill as a derelict tower with cap, windshaft and scoopwheel, but missing its upright shaft and gearing. The mill was listed Grade II on 26 February 1987. Smith surveyed the mill again on 18 May 1989. The mill's condition had not changed, but it had been leased to the Norfolk Windmills Trust by then.

== Description ==
Key's mill is a four storey tower mill. The tower is 12 feet 9 inches (3.89 m) internal diameter at ground floor level, with walls 18 inches (460 mm) thick. It has a boat shape cap. Four Patents sails were carried in a cast iron windshaft. The mill was winded by a fantail. It drove a 17 feet 3 inches (5.26 m) diameter scoopwheel.
