= Tunstall, Norfolk =

Village in Norfolk, England

Coordinates: 52.616°N 1.569°E

Tunstall
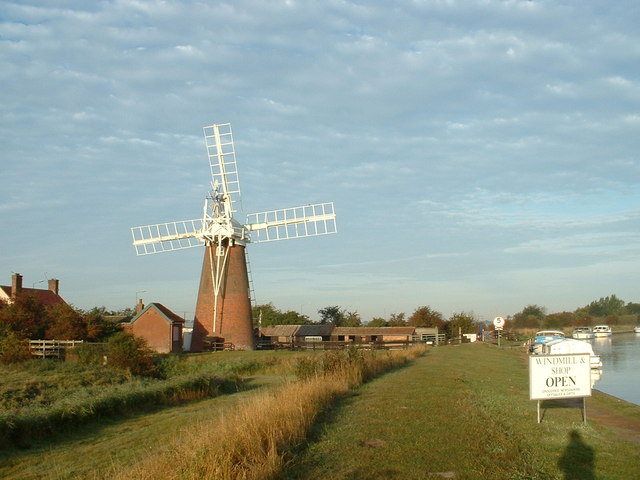
- Stacey Arms windpump

- Location within Norfolk
- OS grid reference: TG4170508020
- Civil parish: Halvergate
- District: Broadland
- Shire county: Norfolk
- Region: East
- Country: England
- Sovereign state: United Kingdom
- Post town: NORWICH
- Postcode district: NR13
- Police: Norfolk
- Fire: Norfolk
- Ambulance: East of England

Tunstall is a village and former civil parish, now in the parish of Halvergate, in the Broadland district of Norfolk, England. It lies some 14 miles (22.5 km) south-east of Norwich alongside the River Bure. In 1931 the parish had a population of 94.

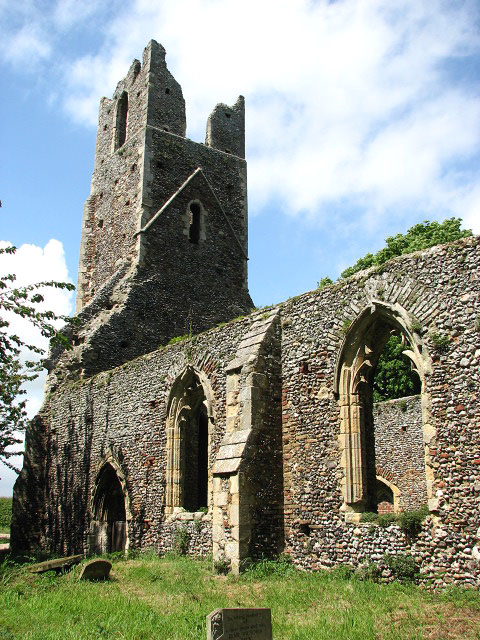
The partly ruined church of St Mary

The ruinous mediaeval parish church of St Peter and St Paul is a grade II* listed building. Although repaired 1705 and extended in 1853, only the chancel is now usable. According to local legend, the church's bells were stolen by the Devil. He plunged with them into a nearby boggy pool, whence their tolling can occasionally be heard.

== History ==
The villages name means 'Farmstead'. On 1 April 1935 the parish was abolished and merged with Halvergate.

== Windmills ==
There are three windmills in Tunstall. All are drainage mills.

- The Stracey Arms Windpump is a tower mill that was once used to drain the surrounding marshland into the River Bure. A grade II* listed building, it is now maintained by the Norfolk Windmills Trust and is a visitor attraction.
- Tunstall Dyke smock mill is a smock mill which has been reduced to a stump. It is a Grade II listed building.
- Tunstall Dyke tower mill is a tower mill which has been conserved, retaining some machinery. It is a Grade II listed building.
