= Neave's Mill, Horning =

Windmill in Horning, Norfolk, England

- Neave's Mill, August 2005
- Interactive map of Neave's Mill, Horning

Origin
- Mill name: Neave's Mill, Kittle's Mill
- Mill location: Horning, Norfolk, United Kingdom
- Grid reference: TG 3655 1758
- Coordinates: 52°42′17″N 1°30′00″E
- Operator: Norfolk Windmills Trust
- Year built: C.1870

Information
- Purpose: Drainage mill
- Type: Tower mill
- Storeys: Four storeys
- No. of sails: Four
- Type of sails: Patent sails
- Windshaft: Cast iron
- Winding: Fantail
- Type of pump: Appold turbine

Neave's or Kittle's Mill is a Grade II listed tower mill in Horning, Norfolk, United Kingdom. A drainage mill built c.1870, it has been conserved by the Norfolk Windmills Trust.

== History ==
Neave's Mill was built c.1870. It was working in 1938, but had become derelict by 1971. In 1980, the Church Commissioners leased the mill to the Norfolk Windmills Trust. Arthur C. Smith surveyed the mill on 29 May 1986. He described it as a four storey tower mill with an aluminium cap, the mill containing its machinery. The mill was listed Grade II on 26 May 1987.

== Description ==
Neave's Mill is a four storey tower mill. It had a boat shape cap with petticoat. The cap ran on a shot curb. Four Patent sails were carried in a cast iron windshaft. The sails had eight bays of three shutters. The windshaft carries a cast iron brake wheel. This drives a cast iron wallower at the top of the wooden upright shaft. The mill drives an Appold turbine.
