= Dydall's Mill, Hoveton =

Tower mill in Hoveton, Norfolk, England

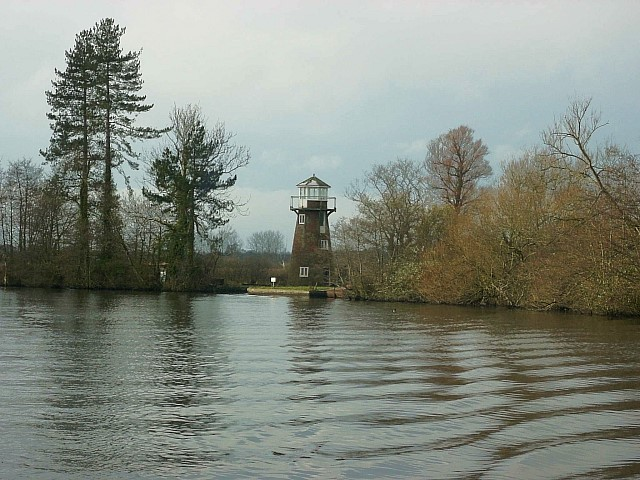
- Dydall's Mill, November 2003
- Interactive map of Dydall's Mill, Hoveton

Origin
- Mill name: Dydall's Mill; Didler's Mill; Miller's Mill
- Mill location: Hoveton, Norfolk, United Kingdom
- Grid reference: TG 3256 1709
- Coordinates: 52°42′06″N 1°26′26″E

Information
- Purpose: Drainage mill
- Type: Tower mill
- Storeys: Three storeys
- No. of sails: Four
- Type of sails: Patent sails
- Windshaft: Cast iron
- Winding: Fantail
- Fantail blades: Ten

Dydall's, Didler's, or Miller's Mill is a tower mill at Hoveton, Norfolk, United Kingdom. It was working until burnt out in the 1910s and has been converted to residential use.

== History ==
Dydall's Mill was marked on the 1880 Ordnance Survey map. It was working until it was burnt out around 1912-14. It was converted to residential use in 1934. The mill is reputedly haunted by the ghost of a millman's daughter who was killed by the sails of the mill.

== Description ==
Dydall's Mill is a three storey tower mill. It had a boat shape cap with gallery. Four double Patent sails were carried on a cast iron windshaft. The mill was winded by a ten-bladed fantail.
