= Black Mill, Upton =

Windmill in Upton, Norfolk, England

- Black Mill, June 2006
- Interactive map of Black Mill, Upton

Origin
- Mill name: Black Mill, Tall Mill
- Mill location: Upton, Norfolk, United Kingdom
- Grid reference: TG 4047 1412
- Coordinates: 52°40′18″N 1°33′25″E
- Year built: 1800

Information
- Purpose: Drainage mill
- Type: Tower mill
- Storeys: Four storeys
- No. of sails: Four
- Type of sails: Patent sails
- Windshaft: Cast iron
- Winding: Fantail
- Fantail blades: Eight
- Auxiliary power: Steam engine, later a diesel engine

'Black or Tall Mill is a Grade II listed tower mill in Upton, Norfolk, United Kingdom. A drainage mill built in 1800, it was working in 1938 but had been converted to holiday accommodation by 1959.

== History ==
Black Mill was built in 1800. A steam engine was later installed as auxiliary power. It was subsequently replaced by a Ruston & Hornsby diesel engine. The mill was working in 1938, but had been converted to holiday accommodation by 1959. Arthur C. Smith surveyed the mill on 21 May 1973. He described the mill as house converted, retaining its cap, windshaft and fan cradle. The mill was listed Grade II on 26 February 1987.

== Description ==
Black Mill is a four-storey tower mill. It has a boat shape cap with a petticoat and gallery. Four Patent sails were carried on a cast iron windshaft. The sails had nine bays of three shutters. The brake wheel was of wood, and part of it remains. The mill was winded by an eight-bladed fantail.
