= Bracey's Mill, Martham =

Windmill in Martham, Norfolk, England

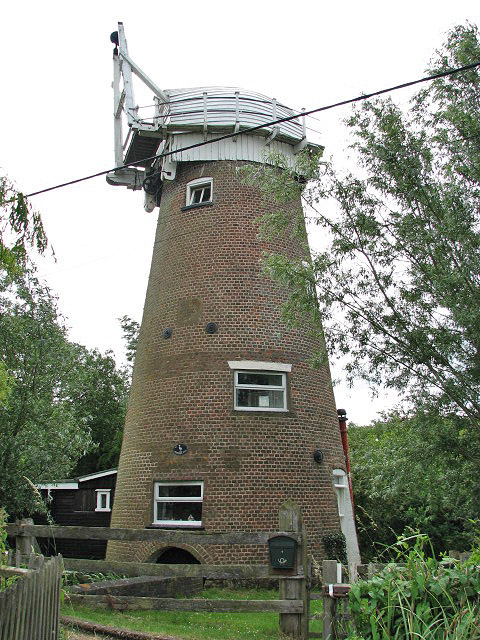
- Bracey's Mill, June 2008
- Interactive map of Bracey's Mill, Martham

Origin
- Mill name: Bracey's Mill; Martham Ferry Mill; Stark's Mill
- Mill location: Martham, Norfolk, United Kingdom
- Grid reference: TG 4426 1928
- Coordinates: 52°42′58″N 1°36′53″E
- Year built: 1908

Information
- Purpose: Drainage mill
- Type: Tower mill
- Storeys: Four
- No. of sails: Four
- Type of sails: Patent sails
- Windshaft: Cast iron
- Winding: Fantail
- Fantail blades: Ten
- Type of pump: Appold turbine

Bracey's, Martham Ferry or Stark's Mill is a Grade II listed tower mill and Martham, Norfolk, United Kingdom. A drainage mill built in 1908, it worked until the 1930s and was converted to residential use in the 1955.

== History ==
Bracey's Mill was built in 1908 by Daniel England, millwright of Ludham. The mill was working c.1932, but was marked as disused on the 1938 Ordnance Survey map. It was known as Stark's Mill in the 1930s. The sails were removed shortly after the mill stopped working. It was converted to residential use in 1955. Arthur C. Smith surveyed the mill on 15 May 1971. He described the mill as converted, retaining its cap and fan cradle. The mill was listed Grade II on 4 December 1987.

== Description ==
Bracey's Mill is a four storey tower mill. The tower is about 40 feet (12 m) tall. It has a boat shape cap with petticoat and gallery. Four double Patent sails were carried on a cast iron windshaft, now missing. The sails had eight bays of three shutters. The mill was winded by a ten-blade fantail. The upright shaft is of wood at the top and cast iron at the bottom. It carries a wallower, and a cast iron great spur wheel, as found in flour mills. The mill drove an Appold turbine.
