= Black Mill, Belton =

Windmill in Belton, Norfolk, England

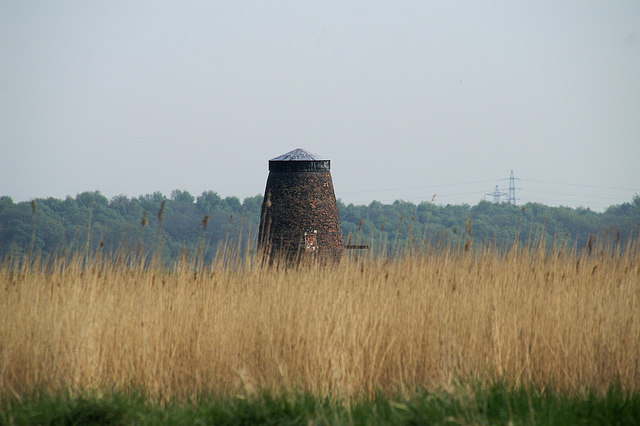
- Black Mill, May 2008
- Interactive map of Black Mill, Belton

Origin
- Mill name: Black Mill
- Mill location: Belton, Norfolk, United Kingdom
- Grid reference: TG 467 035
- Coordinates: 52°34′23″N 1°38′21″E
- Year built: 1830s

Information
- Purpose: Drainage mill
- Type: Tower mill
- Storeys: Three storey tower
- No. of sails: Four
- Type of sails: Common sails
- Winding: Tailpole
- Type of pump: Scoopwheel

Black Mill is a Grade II listed drainage mill at Belton, Norfolk, United Kingdom. It was built in the 1830s and worked by wind until c.1947. The mill was conserved in the 2000s.

== History ==
Black Mill was built in the 1830s and rebuilt in 1907. It worked by wind until c.1947, draining the Belton Marshes into the River Waveney. A sketch by the Gainsborough artist Karl Wood made on 18 September 1950 shows that the mill's tailpole and scoopwheel had been removed by then. The pumping machinery was updated in 1973 by the millwrights Thomas Smithdale & Sons of Acle. The mill was surveyed on 5 May 1975. At that time it retained its boat shaped cap, in a derelict condition. The mill was listed as Grade II on 15 July 1988. The cap had gone by 1989. Photographs show that the tower had been given a new roof by 2008.

== Description ==
Black mill was a three storey tower mill with a boat shaped cap, painted green. A cast iron windshaft carried four Common sails and a clasp arm brake wheel. The mill was winded by a tailpole. It drove a scoopwheel.
