= Stubb Drainage Windmill =

Windmill in Norfolk

- Stubb Mill, May 2017
- Interactive map of Stubb Drainage Windmill

Origin
- Mill name: Stubb Mill
- Mill location: Hickling, Norfolk, United Kingdom
- Grid reference: TG 4374 2219
- Coordinates: 437 220) 52°44′26″N 1°36′41″E
- Year built: C.circa1808

Information
- Purpose: Drainage mill
- Type: Tower mill
- Storeys: Four storeys
- No. of sails: Four
- Type of sails: Patent sails
- Windshaft: Cast iron
- Winding: Fantail
- Auxiliary power: Tractor
- Type of pump: Scoopwheel

Stubb Drainage Windmill is a Grade II listed tower mill at Hickling, Norfolk, United Kingdom. A drainage mill, it was built in the 1800s and worked until 1947. It is under restoration.

== History ==
Stubb Mill is one of several drainage windmills which was built between the years 1795 and 1825 by Sir George Berney Brograve. built c. 1808, it is a tower mill, originally of three stories but later raised to four. Its purpose was to protect the surrounding marshland from flooding during the winter, allowing the land to be used for grazing. Water discharged from Stubb Mill flowed into Meadow Dyke via drains that were also constructed at the time, one of which is called the Commissioners' Drain. This work resulted in the loss of three small broads which were called Wigg's, Gag's and Hare Park Broads.

By 1935, the mill had lost its sails and Fantail. It was last used in the winter of 1947/48, driven by a tractor. Arthur C. Smith surveyed the mill on 15 May 1971 and again on 17 May 1977. He described the mill as derelict without its cap or sails. the mill retained its machinery and scoopwheel. Smith surveyed the mill again on 31 May 1985. The mill was still derelict. He noted that the fanstage had been removed in November 1977 and the windshaft and brake wheel had subsequently been removed. The mill was listed Grade II on 30 September 1987. It was later added to the Buildings at Risk Register.

The mill was restored between 2006 and 2010, as part of a Broads Authority initiative funded by the National Lottery. The culmination of the project was the fitting of a new cedar and oak cap on 5 October 2010.

== Description ==
As built, Stubb Mill was a three storey tower mill. It had four Common sails. The mill was later raised by a storey. The mill has a boat shape cap with petticoat. The cap runs on a live curb. Four Patent sails were carried on a cast iron windshaft. The mill was winded by a fantail. The windshaft carried a wooden brake wheel of clasp arm construction. The brake wheel drove a cast iron wallower at the top of the wooden upright shaft. At the bottom of the upright shaft, a wooden crown wheel drives a wooden clasp arm pit wheel, which drove the scoopwheel.
