= High's Mill, Potter Heigham =

Windmill in Potter Heigham, Norfolk, England

- High's Mill, April 2026
- Interactive map of High's Mill, Potter Heigham

Origin
- Mill name: High's Mill
- Mill location: Potter Heigham, Norfolk, United Kingdom
- Grid reference: TG 4295 1902
- Coordinates: 52°42′51″N 1°35′44″E
- Year built: C.1875

Information
- Purpose: Drainage mill
- Type: Tower mill
- Storeys: Four storeys
- No. of sails: Four
- Type of sails: Patent sails
- Windshaft: Cast iron
- Winding: Fantail
- Fantail blades: Six
- Auxiliary power: Steam engine
- Type of pump: Appold turbine

High's Mill is a Grade II listed tower mill at Potter Heigham, Norfolk, United Kingdom. A drainage mill, it has been converted to holiday accommodation.

== History ==
High's Mill was built c.1875 by William Rust, millwright of Stalham, Norfolk. A steam engine was used as auxiliary power. The engine was built by Riches & Watts, millwrights and engineers, Norwich in 1871. It was replaced by an electric pump in 1938. The mill was converted to residential use in the 1960s; It had already been converted when the mill was listed Grade II on 17 December 1962. Arthur C. Smith surveyed the mill on 24 September 1971. He described the mill as retaining its cap, fan cradle and a stock. The stock had been removed by 1978. He surveyed the mill again on 29 May 1986, noting that the mill retained some machinery and its turbine pump. The mill was renovated in 2016–17 by Richard Seago, millwright of South Walsham, Norfolk.

== Description ==
High's Mill is a four-storey tower mill. It has a boat shape cap with petticoat. Four Patent sails were carried on a cast iron windshaft. The sails had eight bays of three shutters. The mill was winded by a six-bladed fantail. The windshaft carries a cast iron brake wheel. The mill drove an Appold turbine, which remains.
