= West Marsh Mill, West Somerton =

Windmill in Norfolk, England

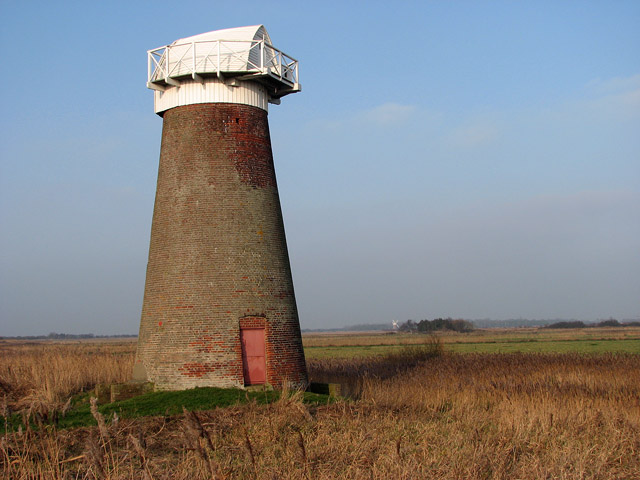
- West Marsh Mill, December 2008
- Interactive map of West Marsh Mill, West Somerton

Origin
- Mill name: West Marsh Mill
- Mill location: West Somerton, Norfolk, United Kingdom
- Grid reference: TG 4642 2023
- Coordinates: 52°43′37″N 1°38′50″E
- Year built: 18th century

Information
- Purpose: Drainage mill
- Type: Tower mill
- Storeys: Four storeys
- No. of sails: Four
- Type of sails: Patent sails
- Windshaft: Cast iron
- Winding: Fantail
- Type of pump: Appold turbine

West Marsh Mill is a Grade II listed tower mill at West Somerton, Norfolk, United Kingdom. A drainage mill built in the 19th century, it has been converted to residential accommodation.

== History ==
West Marsh Mill was built in the 18th century. It was marked on the 1836 Ordnance Survey map. The mill was rebuilt in 1858. It was rebuilt in 1900 by Daniel England, millwright of Ludham, Norfolk. The mill had ceased working by 1950. The mill was listed Grade II on 20 February 1952. The last three sails were removed in 1959. Arthur C. Smith surveyed the mill on 15 May 1971. He described the mill as derelict with its cap. He surveyed the mill again on 20 May 1986. By then, the mill had been converted to residential use.

== Description ==
West Marsh Mill is a four-storey tower mill. It has a boat shape cap with petticoat and gallery. Four double Patent sails were carried on a cast iron windshaft. The mill was winded by a fantail. Some of the interior machinery remains, including a cast iron crown wheel, at the bottom of the upright shaft. The mill drove an Appold turbine.
