= Swim Coots Mill, Catfield =

Windmill in Catfield, Norfolk, England

Catfield Windmill
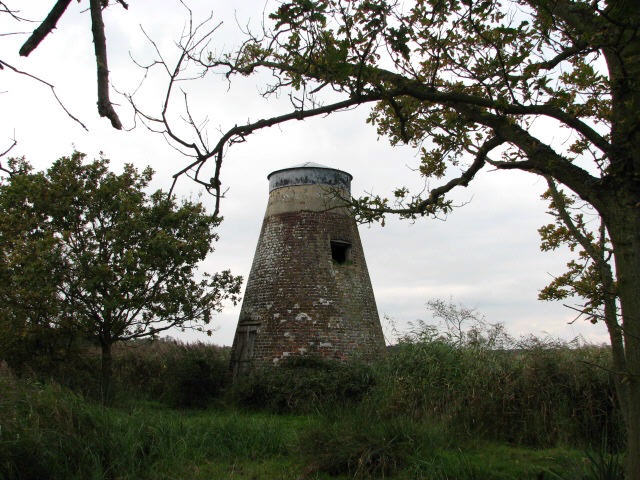

Origin
- Mill name: Swim Coots Mill
- Mill location: TG 4113 2122
- Coordinates: 52°44′05″N 1°34′13″E
- Operator(s): Private
- Year built: Early 18th century

Information
- Purpose: Drainage mill and grist mill
- Type: Tower mill
- Storeys: Two storeys
- No. of sails: Four sails
- Type of sails: Double Patent sails
- Winding: Fantail
- Fantail blades: Six blades
- No. of pairs of millstones: One pair
- Type of pump: Scoopwheel
- Scoopwheel diameter: 5 feet 2 inches (1.57 m)

Swim Coots Mill is a tower mill at Catfield, Norfolk, England which has been conserved with some machinery remaining.

== History ==
Swim Coots Mill was built in the early nineteenth century. It was marked on the 1838 Ordnance Survey map. The mill was working until at least the 1930s but was derelict by 1978. The mill has since been conserved, with the tower roofed over.

== Description ==
Swim Coots mill is a two storey tower mill which formerly had a boat shaped cap winded by a fantail. It had four double Patent sails. The tower is 15 feet (4.57 m) diameter at the base and 19 feet (5.79 m) high to curb level. It drove a 5 feet 2 inches (1.57 m) diameter scoopwheel housed internally. The mill also drove a single pair of millstones.
