= Norton Marshes Windpump =

Windmill in Norton Subcourse, Norfolk, England

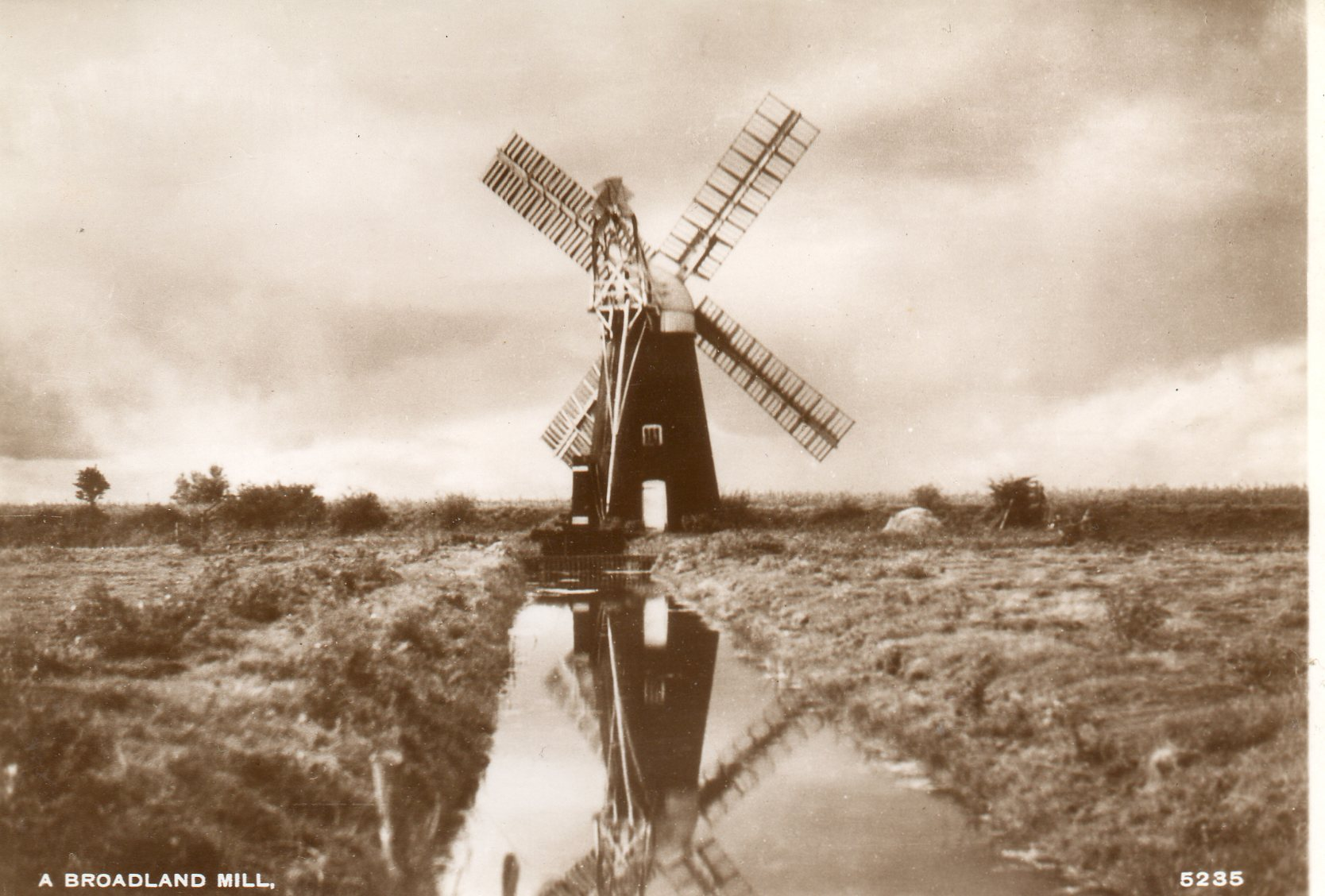
- Norton Subcourse Mill, pre-1908
- Interactive map of Norton Marshes Windpump

Origin
- Mill location: Norton Subcourse, Norfolk, United Kingdom
- Grid reference: TG 403 011
- Coordinates: 52°33′18″N 1°32′39″E
- Year built: 1863

Information
- Purpose: Drainage mill
- Type: Tower mill
- Storeys: Four storeys
- No. of sails: Four
- Type of sails: Patent sails
- Windshaft: Cast iron
- Winding: Fantail
- Fantail blades: Eight
- Type of pump: Scoopwheel

Norton Marshes Windpump is a tower mill at Norton Subcourse, Norfolk, United Kingdom. A drainage mill, it has been converted to holiday accommodation.

== History ==
Norton Marshes windpump was built in 1863. It was working in September 1934. Arthur C. Smith surveyed the mill on 10 June 1974 and again on 27 May 1978. He described the mill as house converted, with a conical iron roof and retaining the scoopwheel housing. Smith surveyed the mill again on 27 May 1986 and 19 May 1989. He stated that house conversion was still underway, and that the conical iron roof had been removed in 1988. A new cap was fitted to the mill in April 1997 by Richard Seago, millwright of South Walsham, Norfolk. As of 2007, the mill was used as holiday accommodation.

== Description ==
Norton Marshes Windpump is a four storey tower mill. The tower is 30 feet 3 inches (9.22 m) tall. It is 20 feet 6 inches (6.25 m) outside diameter at the base, with walls 22 1/2 inches (570 mm) thick. The tower is 12 feet 6 inches (3.81 m) inside diameter at curb level. The mill has a boat shape cap with a petticoat and gallery. Four Patent sails were carried on a cast iron windshaft. The sails had nine bays of three shutters. The mill was winded by an eight-bladed fantail. The mill drove a scoopwheel, the housing of which remains. No machinery remains in the mill.
