= South Mill, Runham =

Windmill in Norfolk, England

- South Mill, January 2011
- Interactive map of South Mill, Runham

Origin
- Mill name: South Mill; Perry's Mill
- Mill location: Runham, Norfolk, United Kingdom
- Grid reference: TG 4719 0987
- Coordinates: 52°37′49″N 1°39′03″E
- Operator: Norfolk Windmills Trust
- Year built: 19th century

Information
- Purpose: Drainage mill
- Type: Tower mill
- Storeys: Three storeys
- No. of sails: Four
- Type of sails: Patent sails
- Windshaft: Cast iron
- Winding: Fantail
- Fantail blades: Eight
- Type of pump: Scoopwheel, later Appold turbine

South or Perry's Mill is a Grade II listed tower mill at Runham, Norfolk, United Kingdom. A drainage mill built in the 19th century, it has been conserved.

== History ==
South Mill was built in the 19th century. It is marked on the 1884 Ordnance Survey Map. Arthur C. Smith surveyed the mill on 10 July 1973. He described the mill as derelict without its cap or sails, but retaining the fan cradle. The mill had all its machinery.. Smith surveyed the mill again on 14 July 1987. By then, the mill was in the ownership of the Norfolk Windmills Trust. It had been conserved with an aluminium cap fitted to the tower. The mill was listed Grade II on 15 July 1988.

== Description ==
South Mill is a three storey tower mill. The tower is about 30 feet (9.1 m) tall. The mill had a boat shape cap with a petticoat. Four Patent sails were carried on a cast iron windshaft. The mill was winded by an eight-bladed fantail. The windshaft carries a cast iron brake wheel, which drives a cast iron wallower at the top of the wooden upright shaft. At the bottom of the upright shaft, a cast iron crown wheel drives a cast iron pit wheel. The mill originally drove an internal scoopwheel, later replaced by an Appold turbine.
