= Wayford Bridge Mill, Smallburgh =

Windmill in Smallburgh, Norfolk, England

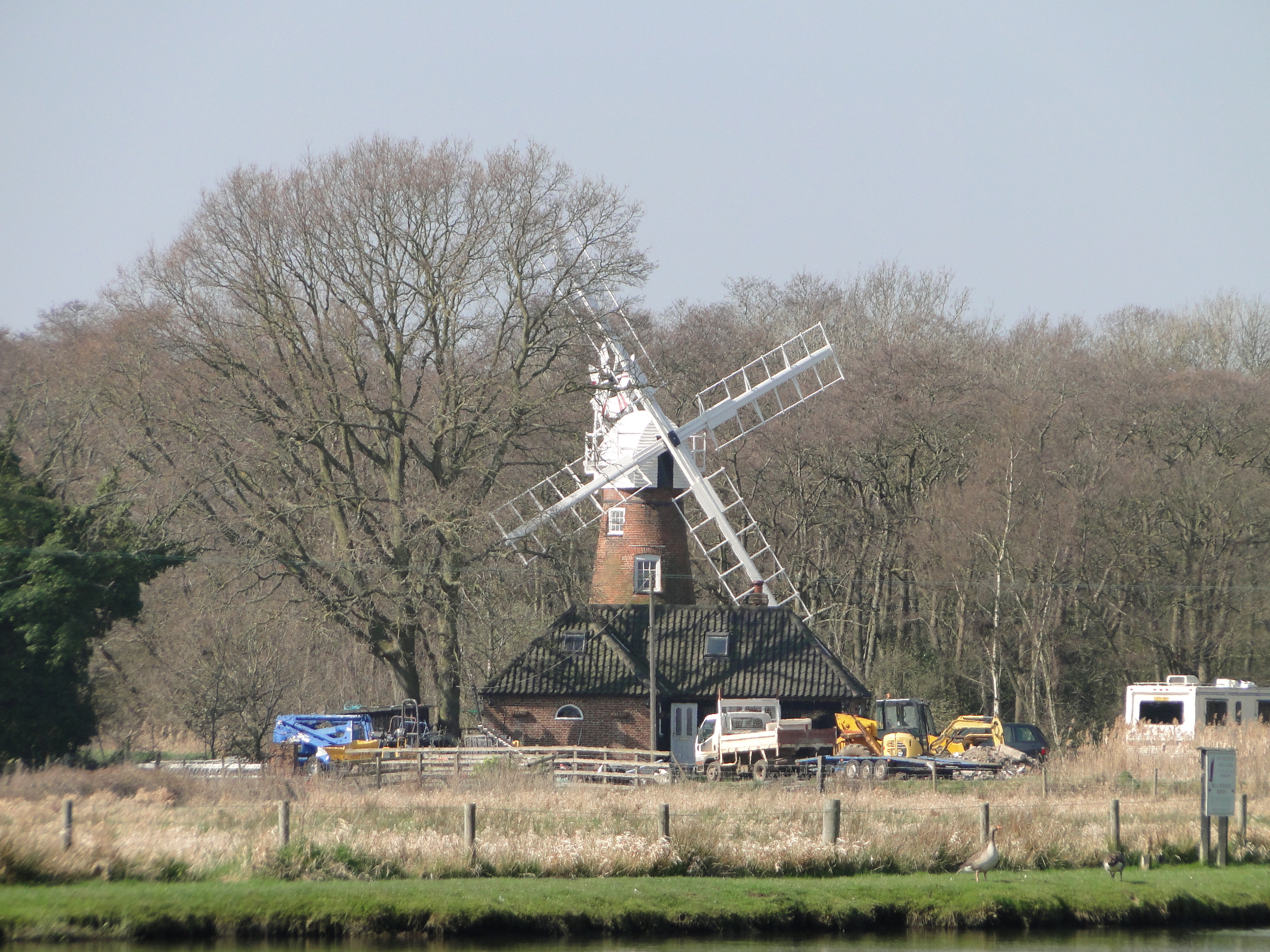
- Wayford Bridge / Dilham Dyke Mill, March 2019
- Interactive map of Wayford Bridge Mill, Smallburgh

Origin
- Mill name: Wayford Bridge Mill; Dilham Dyke Mill
- Mill location: Smallburgh, Norfolk, United Kingdom
- Grid reference: TG 3442 2483
- Coordinates: 52°46′12″N 1°28′25″E

Information
- Purpose: Drainage mill and corn mill
- Type: Tower mill
- Storeys: Four storeys
- No. of sails: Four
- Type of sails: Patent sails
- Windshaft: Cast iron
- Winding: Fantail
- Fantail blades: Eight
- No. of pairs of millstones: One pair
- Size of millstones: 3 feet 6 inches (1.07 m) diameter
- Type of pump: Scoopwheel
- Scoopwheel diameter: 14 feet 0 inches (4.27 m)

Wayford Bridge Mill, or Dilham Dyke Mill is a four storey tower mill at Smallburgh, Norfolk, United Kingdom which served the dual function of a drainage and corn mill. Built in 1847, it was converted to a holiday home in 1979.

== History ==
Wayford Bridge Mill was built by Englands, the Ludham millwrights in 1847. Eli Knights was the miller in 1850, followed by Henry Knights from 1854 to 1863. An accident at the mill killed a girl who was trying to rescue her brother, who had fallen into the mill pit. He survived severely injured.

The mill retained its cap and sails in 1950, but had lost its fantail. The mill was subsequently stripped, leaving an empty tower. It was offered for sale in 1978 with planning permission to convert it to residential uses. It was converted to a holiday home in 1979. In 1984, planning permission was granted by the Broads Authority for the reinstatement of the cap. sails and fantail.

== Description ==
Wayford Bridge Mill is a four storey tower mill. The tower is about 31 feet (9.4 m) tall and is 16 feet 0 inches (4.88 m) external diameter at the base, with walls 18 inches (460 mm) thick. When working, it had a boat shape cap with a petticoat and gallery. Four Patent sails were carried on a cast iron windshaft. The sails had six bays, five with three shutters and one with four. The mill was winded by an eight-bladed fantail. The upright shaft was of wood. It carried a cast iron great spur wheel and an iron bevel wheel at the bottom. This drove a cast iron pit wheel. The shaft the pit wheel was on carried a 14 feet 0 inches (4.27 m) diameter scoopwheel, which had paddles 9 inches (230 mm) wide. A pair of 3 feet 6 inches (1.07 m) diameter millstones were driven underdrift from the great spur wheel.
