= St Margaret's Mill, Fleggburgh =

Windmill in Fleggburgh, Norfolk, England

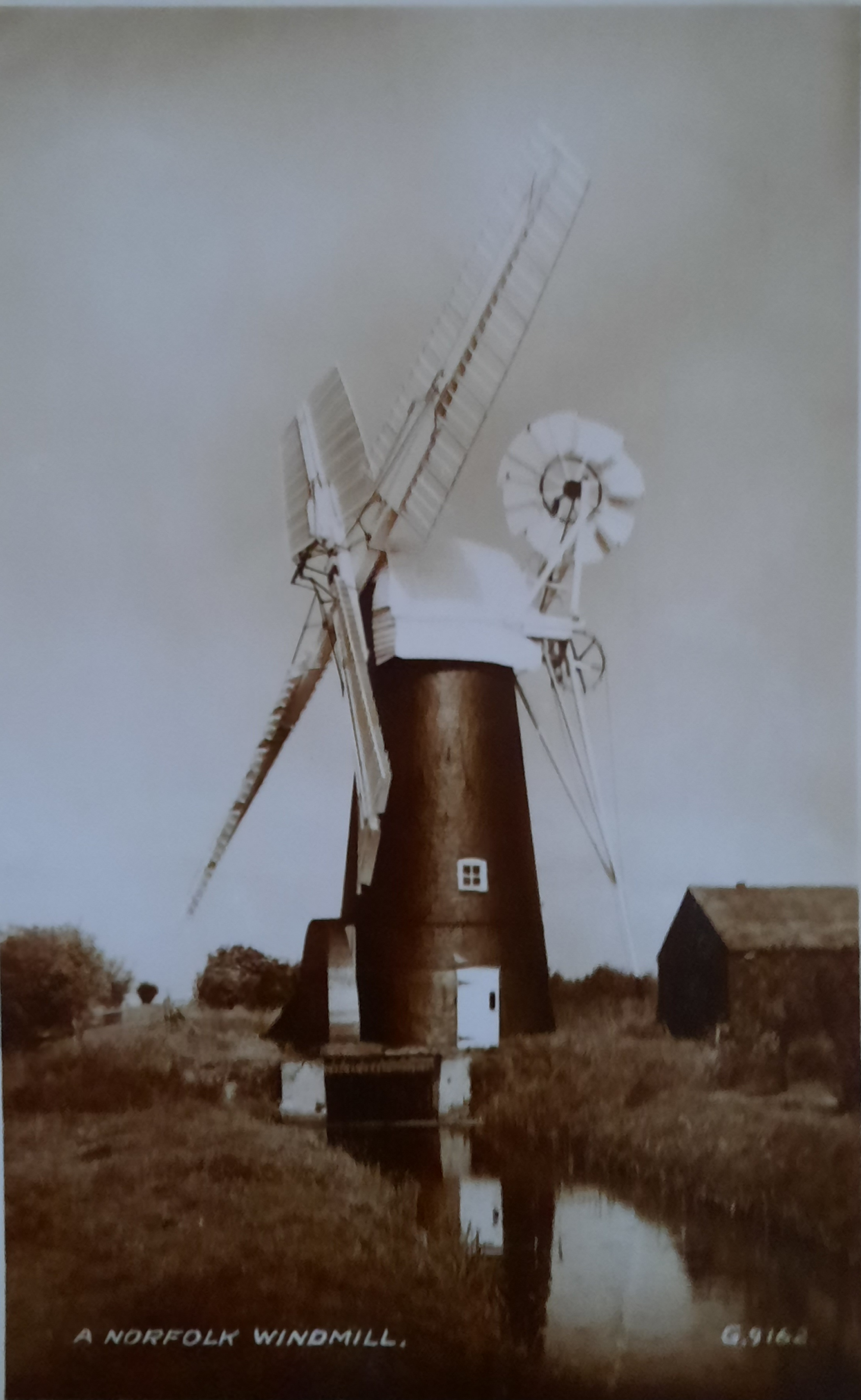
- St. Margaret's Mill, c.1923
- Interactive map of St Margaret's Mill, Fleggburgh

Origin
- Mill name: St. Margaret's Mill
- Mill location: Fleggburgh, Norfolk, United Kingdom
- Grid reference: TG 4182 1198
- Coordinates: 52°39′04″N 1°34′29″E
- Year built: C.1747

Information
- Purpose: Drainage mill
- Type: Tower mill
- Storeys: Four storeys
- No. of sails: Four
- Type of sails: Patent sails
- Windshaft: Cast iron
- Winding: Fantail
- Fantail blades: Eight
- Type of pump: Scoopwheel

St. Margaret's Mill is a tower mill at Fleggburgh, Norfolk, United Kingdom which was built in the mid-18th Century. It worked until the 1960s and has been converted to residential use.

== History ==
St. Margaret's Mill was built c.1747. It was working until c.1960 and was converted to residential use for John Glyn-Jones in the 1960s. The cap and sails were removed, and a glazed look-out added to the top of the tower, topped by a timber roof in the shape of a half barrel. A large building was built alongside the tower. In the 1970s, it was converted to a restaurant, serving as such until 2004. In 2005, the mill was being used as bed and breakfast accommodation.

== Description ==
St Margaret's Mill is a four storey tower mill. It had a boat shape cap with a petticoat. Four double Patent sails were carried on a cast iron windshaft. The mill was winded by an eight-bladed fantail. It drove a scoopwheel.
