= Old Hall Mill, Belaugh =

Windmill in Norfolk, England

- Interactive map of Old Hall Mill, Belaugh

Origin
- Mill name: Old Hall Mill
- Mill location: Belaugh, Norfolk, United Kingdom
- Grid reference: TG 293 175
- Coordinates: 52°42′23″N 1°23′34″E

Information
- Purpose: Drainage mill
- Type: Tower mill
- Storeys: Four storeys
- No. of sails: Four
- Type of pump: Scoopwheel

Old Hall Mill is a tower mill in Belaugh, Norfolk, United Kingdom. A drainage mill, its tower survives, devoid of machinery but housing a turbine pump.

== History ==
Old Hall Mill was marked on the 1881 Ordnance Survey map. It was derelict by June 1988. The tower standing with a conical roof that was falling apart. A shed attached to the tower housed a Bodan turbine. This was driven by a petrol engine housed in the mill tower.

== Description ==
Old Hall Mill is a four storey tower mill. The tower is about 29 feet (8.8 m) tall. It is 10 feet 0 inches (3.05 m) internal diameter at ground floor level, with walls 18 inches (460 mm) thick. The mill drove a scoopwheel.
