= Repps Windpump =

Windmill in Norfolk, England

- Repps Windpump, August 2015
- Interactive map of Repps Windpump

Origin
- Mill name: Repps Windpump
- Mill location: Repps, Norfolk, United Kingdom
- Grid reference: TG 4182 1792
- Coordinates: 52°42′18″N 1°34′40″E
- Year built: 19th century

Information
- Purpose: Drainage mill
- Type: Tower mill
- Storeys: Four storeys
- No. of sails: Four
- Type of sails: Patent sails
- Windshaft: Cast iron
- Winding: Fantail
- Fantail blades: Six
- Type of pump: Scoopwheel

Repps Windpump is a tower mill at Repps, Norfolk, United Kingdom. A drainage mill working in the 1920s, it has been converted to holiday accommodation.

== History ==
Repps Windpump was built in the 19th century. It was working c.1920, but had ceased work by 1934. In 1950, just a derelict empty tower remained. The mill was converted to residential accommodation c.1970. At one point, it was owned by actor Roger Moore. Arthur C. Smith surveyed the mill on 15 May 1971. He described it as a converted tower with a flat roof, balcony and extension. A new cap was fitted to the tower in 2010. As of 2021, the mill was used as holiday accommodation.

== Description ==
As built, the mill was a three storey tower mill. It would have carried Common sails and been winded by a tailpole. The tower is about 31 feet (9.4 m) tall. The mill has a boat shape cap with petticoat and gallery. The gallery was not a feature of the working mill. It had four Patent sails carried on a cast iron windshaft. The sails had seven bays of three shutters. The mill was winded by a six-bladed fantail. It drove a scoopwheel.
