= Howard's Mill, Halvergate =

Windmill in Halvergate, Norfolk, England

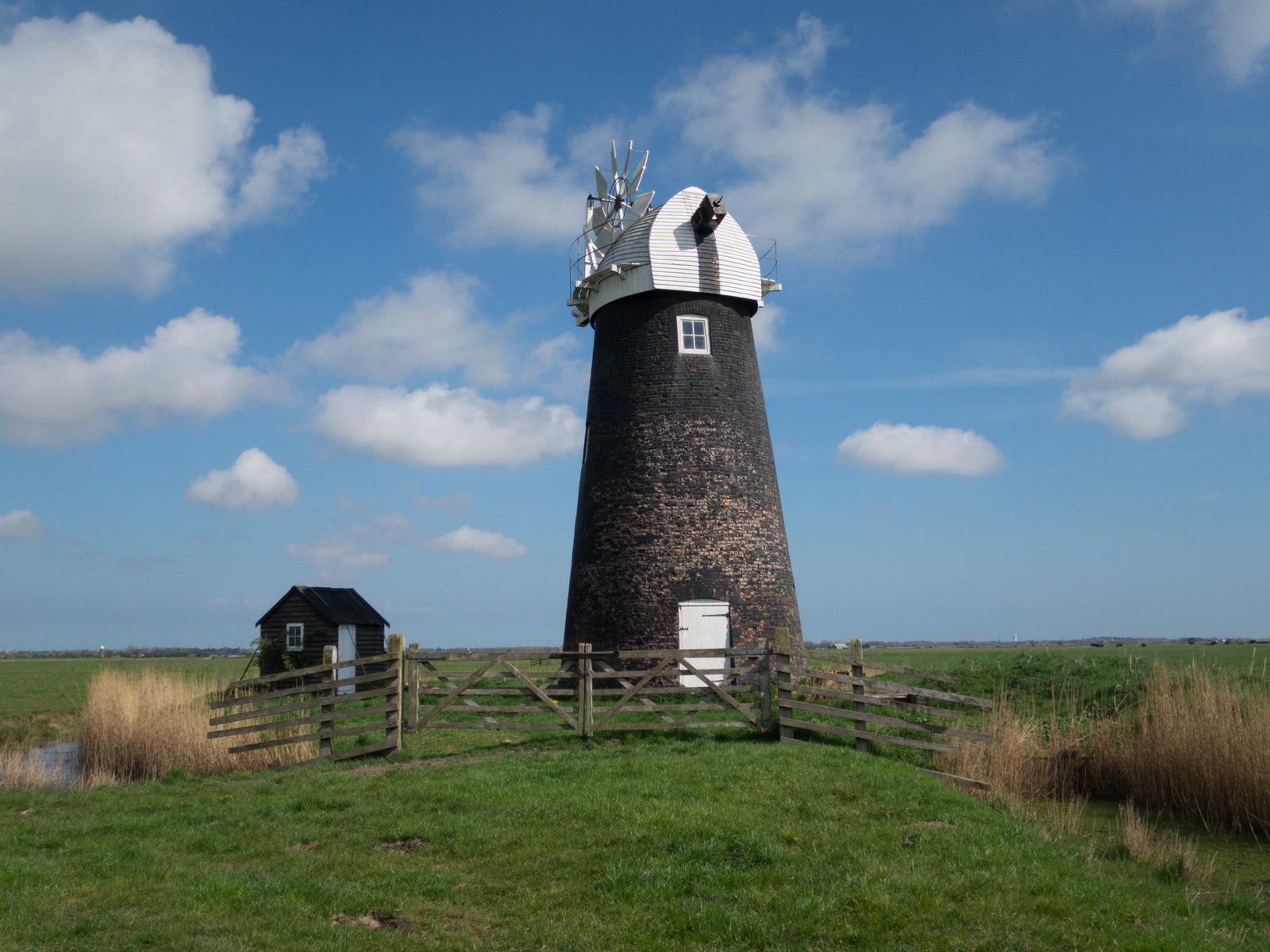
- Howard's Mill, April 2014
- Interactive map of Howard's Mill, Halvergate

Origin
- Mill name: Howard's Mill
- Mill location: Halvergate, Norfolk, United Kingdom
- Grid reference: TG 4624 0725
- Coordinates: 52°36′23″N 1°38′07″E
- Year built: Mid 19th century

Information
- Purpose: Drainage mill
- Type: Tower mill
- Storeys: Three storeys
- No. of sails: Four
- Type of sails: Patent sails
- Windshaft: Cast iron
- Winding: Fantail
- Fantail blades: Eight
- Type of pump: Scoopwheel
- Scoopwheel diameter: 14 feet 6 inches (4.42 m)

Howard's, or South Walsham Mill is a Grade II listed tower mill at Halvergate, Norfolk, United Kingdom. A drainage mill, it has been restored.

== History ==
Howard's Mill was built in the mid 19th century. Arthur C. Smith surveyed the mill on 6 May 1974. He described it as a derelict tower mill with cap and fan cradle. The mill had two Patent sails in poor condition and contained all its machinery. The mill was listed Grade II on 26 February 1987. Smith surveyed the mill again on 5 July 1988. The mill was the under restoration, with a temporary ridged roof. New doors and windows had been fitted. In his book, he notes that the new cap and fantail were fitted in October 1989.

== Description ==
Howard's Mill is a three storey tower mill. The tower is 32 feet (9.8 m) tall. It has a boat shape cap with petticoat and gallery. Four Patent sails were carried in a cast iron windshaft, which also carries a cast iron brake wheel. The mill drove a 14 feet 6 inches (4,420 mm) diameter scoopwheel, which was made by Smithdale's, the Acle millwrights.
