= Pettingell's Mill, Chedgrave =

Windmill in Norfolk, England

Coordinates: 52°33′24″N 1°37′33″E

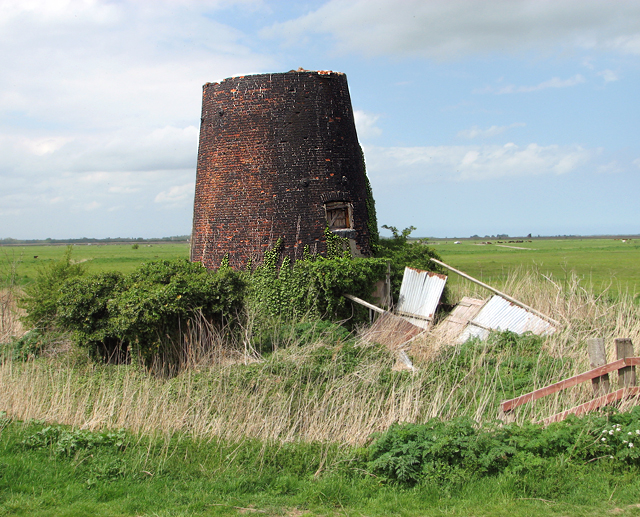
- Pettingell's Mill, May 2015
- Interactive map of Pettingell's Mill, Chedgrave

Origin
- Mill name: Pettingell's Mill
- Mill location: Chedgrave, Norfolk, United Kingdom
- Grid reference: TG 4589 0163
- Year built: C1800

Information
- Purpose: Drainage mill
- Type: Tower mill
- Storeys: Three storeys
- No. of sails: Four
- Type of sails: Common sails, later two common sails and two Patent sails
- Windshaft: Wood
- Winding: Tailpole
- Auxiliary power: Tractor
- Type of pump: Scoopwheel

Pettingell's, or Seven Mile House Mill is a Grade II listed tower mill at Chedgrave, Norfolk, United Kingdom. A drainage mill, the derelict tower survives.

== History ==
Pettingell's Mill was built c. 1800. Originally built with four Common sails, millwright W. T. England of Ludham, Norfolk fitted a pair of Patent sails. It took two weeks to bore the wooden windshaft to take the striking rod for the sails. By 1939, a tractor was used as auxiliary power to drive the scoopwheel. The mill was driven this way in the aftermath of the 1953 floods. An electric pumping station replaced the mill in 1956. The mill was surveyed by Arthur C. Smith on 15 May 1989. He described the mill as a small, derelict, tower mill covered in ivy, devoid of machinery but retaining its scoopwheel housing. The mill was listed Grade II on 22 February 1986. By 2022, the mill had been stripped of its ivy and a conical aluminium roof had been fitted to the tower.

== Description ==
Pettingell's Mill is a three storey tower mill winded by a tailpole. Four Common sails were carried on a wooden windshaft. Latterly one pair of Common sails and one pair of Patent sails were carried. The mill drove a scoopwheel.
