= Commission Mill, Stokesby =

Windmill in Stokesby, Norfolk, England

- Commission Mill, September 2009
- Interactive map of Commission Mill, Stokesby

Origin
- Mill name: Commission Mill
- Mill location: Stokesby, Norfolk, United Kingdom
- Grid reference: TG 4225 1045
- Coordinates: 52°38′17″N 1°34′44″E
- Year built: 1800s

Information
- Purpose: Drainage mill
- Type: Tower mill
- Storeys: Four storeys
- No. of sails: Four
- Type of sails: Patent sails
- Windshaft: Cast iron
- Winding: Fantail
- Fantail blades: Eight
- Type of pump: Scoopwheel

Commission Mill is a Grade II listed tower mill in Stokesby, Norfolk, United Kingdom. A drainage mill built in the 1800s, it has been converted to residential accommodation.

== History ==
Commission Mill was built in the 1800s by William Rust. It was working c.1929. Arthur C. Smith surveyed the mill on 17 September 1973. He described the mill as preserved with a flat roof. He surveyed the mill again on 29 July 1985. The mill had been converted to residential use by then. The mill was listed Grade II on 4 December 1987.

== Description ==
Commission Mill is a four-storey tower mill. It had a boat shape cap. Four Patent sails were carried on a cast iron windshaft. The mill was winded by an eight-blade fantail. It drove a scoopwheel.
