= Buckenham Ferry Windmill =

Windmill in Norfolk, England

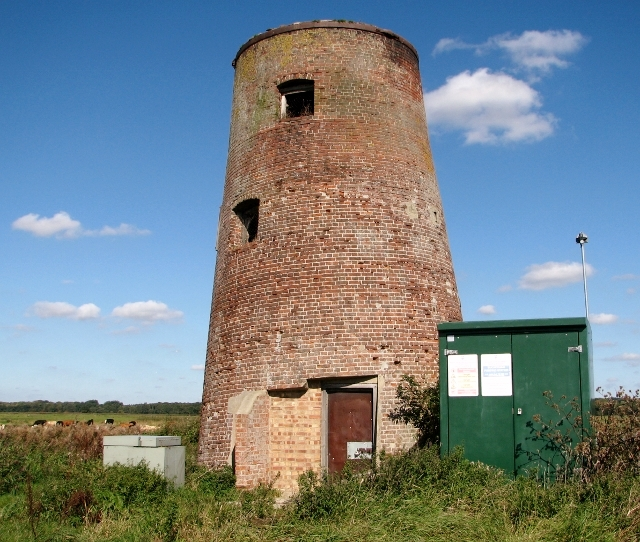
- Buckenham Ferry Windmill, September 2017
- Interactive map of Buckenham Ferry Windmill

Origin
- Mill name: Buckenham Ferry Windmill
- Mill location: Buckenham, Norfolk, United Kingdom
- Grid reference: TG 3536 0444
- Coordinates: 52°35′11″N 1°28′23″E

Information
- Purpose: Drainage mill
- Type: Tower mill
- Storeys: Four storeys
- No. of sails: Four

Buckenham Ferry Windmill is a tower mill in Buckenham, Norfolk, England. Built as a drainage mill, it was converted to a bird hide in 1993.

== History ==
Buckenham Ferry Windmill was derelict by 1989, with a distinct lean. A modern pump was housed in a shed built on to the tower. In 1993, it was converted to a bird hide for the Royal Society for the Protection of Birds. The Army Air Corps lifted a flat roof onto the tower using a helicopter on 27 October 1993. The flat roof was destroyed in a gale in 2007.

== Description ==
Buckenham Ferry Windmill is a four storey tower mill.
