= Stone's Mill, Halvergate =

Windmill in Norfolk, England

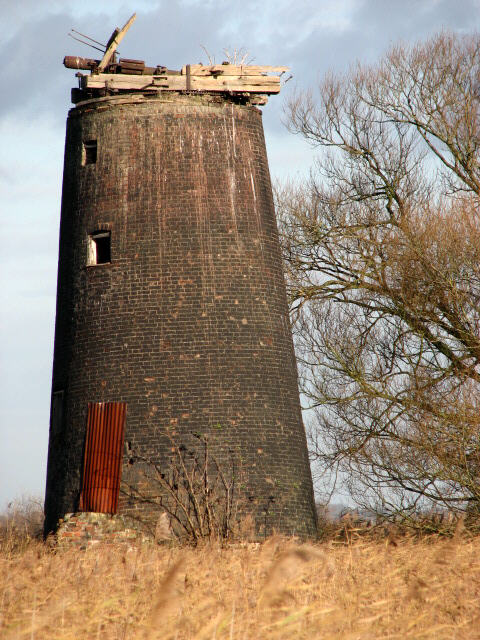
- Stone's Mill, November 2007
- Interactive map of Stone's Mill, Halvergate

Origin
- Mill name: Stone's Mill
- Mill location: Halvergate, Norfolk, United Kingdom
- Grid reference: TG 441 056
- Coordinates: 52°35′37″N 1°36′11″E
- Year built: Mid 19th century

Information
- Purpose: Drainage mill
- Type: tower mill
- Storeys: Four storeys
- No. of sails: Four
- Windshaft: Cast iron
- Winding: Fantail

Stone's, or Kerry's Mill, is a Grade II listed tower mill in Halvergate, Norfolk, United Kingdom. A drainage mill, it is derelict.

== History ==
Stone's Mill was built in the mid 19th century. Arthur C. Smith surveyed the mill on 17 September 1973 and again on 10 June 1974. He described it as a derelict tower mill with it windshaft, brake wheel and machinery.. The mill was listed Grade II on 26 February 1987. Smith surveyed the mill again on 14 June 1989. The mill had its cap frame, windshaft without its canister and the upright shaft was missing. Only part of the scoopwheel remained.

== Description ==
Stone's Mill is a four storey tower mill. It had a cast iron windshaft which carried four sails. The wooden brake wheel was of clasp arm construction. The mill was winded by a fantail. The mill drove a scoopwheel.
