= Tunstall Dyke smock mill =

Windmill in Norfolk, England

- Tunstall Dyke smock mill, September 2015
- Interactive map of Tunstall Dyke smock mill

Origin
- Mill name: Tunstall Dyke smock mill, Acle Mill
- Mill location: Tunstall, Norfolk, United Kingdom
- Grid reference: TG 4233 0923
- Coordinates: 52°37′35″N 1°34′45″E
- Year built: Late 18th century

Information
- Purpose: Drainage mill
- Type: Smock mill
- Base storeys: Low brick base of a few courses
- Smock sides: Eight
- No. of sails: Four
- Type of pump: Appold turbine

Tunstall Dyke smock mill, or Acle Mill is a Grade II listed smock mill at Tunstall, Norfolk. A drainage mill reduced to a stump, it has been conserved.

== History ==
Tunstall Dyke mill was built in the late 18th century. It was marked on the 1884 and 1905 Ordnance Survey maps. Arthur C. Smith surveyed the mill on 17 September 1973. The mill was then a derelict stump. The mill was listed Grade II on 26 February 1987. Smith surveyed the mill again on 5 July 1988 and 21 May 1989. The mill's condition had not changed, although he noted that no machinery remained. The mill was conserved in 1994.

== Description ==
Tunstall Dyke Mill is a smock mill, now reduced to a stump. It had eight sides. The mill had four sails. It drove an Appold turbine.
