= Womack Water Windpump =

Windmill in Ludham, Norfolk, England

- Womack Water Mill, September 2008
- Interactive map of Womack Water Windpump

Origin
- Mill name: Womack Water Mill
- Mill location: Ludham, Norfolk, United Kingdom
- Grid reference: TG 3999 1750
- Coordinates: 52°42′07″N 1°33′01″E

Information
- Purpose: Drainage mill
- Type: Tower mill
- Storeys: Three storeys
- No. of sails: Four
- Windshaft: Wood
- Winding: Tailpole
- Type of pump: Scoopwheel

Womack Water Windpump is a tower mill at Ludham, Norfolk, United Kingdom. It is derelict, retaining some machinery.

== History ==
Womack Water Windpum[ was marked on the 1905 Ordnance Survey map, with the annotation "disused". Arthur C. Smith surveyed the mill on 24 September 1971. He described the mill as derelict with some machinery inside. He surveyed the mill again on 23 May 1986, taking detailed measurements.

== Description ==
Womack Water Windpump is a three storey tower mill. The tower is about 23 feet (7.0 m) tall and 15 feet 10 inches (4.83 m) outside diameter at the base, with walls 20 inches (510 mm) thick. The mill had a wooden windshaft and four sails. Winding was by tailpole. The wooden upright shaft is 13 inches (330 mm) diameter. It has a cast iron wallower and crown wheel. The crown wheel is 17 1/4 inches (440 mm) diameter. It drove a 4 feet 2 inches (1,270 mm) diameter pit wheel on a 4 1/4 inches (110 mm) square cast iron shaft. This drove the scoopwheel.
