= Old Hall Mill, Stokesby =

Windmill in Stokesby, Norfolk, England

- Old Hall Mill, January 2011
- Interactive map of Old Hall Mill, Stokesby

Origin
- Mill name: Old Hall Mill; Dack's Mill
- Mill location: Stokesby, Norfolk, United Kingdom
- Grid reference: TG 4365 0944
- Coordinates: 52°37′41″N 1°35′56″E
- Year built: 19th century

Information
- Purpose: Drainage mill
- Type: Tower mill
- Storeys: Three storeys
- No. of sails: Four
- Type of sails: Common sails
- Windshaft: Cast iron
- Winding: Tailpole
- Type of pump: Scoopwheel

Old Hall or Dack's Mill is a tower mill at Stokesby, Norfolk, United Kingdom. A drainage mill built in the 19th century, it was working in 1930. A derelict, empty tower survives.

== History ==
Old Hall Mill, also known as Dack's Mill, was built in the 19th century. It was marked on the 1884 Ordnance Survey map. The mill was working in 1930. Arthur C. Smith surveyed the mill on 10 July 1973. By then, only a derelict empty tower remained.

== Description ==
Old Hall Mill is a three-storey tower mill. It had a boat shape cap. Four Common sails were carried on a cast iron windshaft. The mill was winded by a tailpole. It drove a scoopwheel.
