= Six Mile House Mill, Chedgrave =

Windmill in Norfolk, England

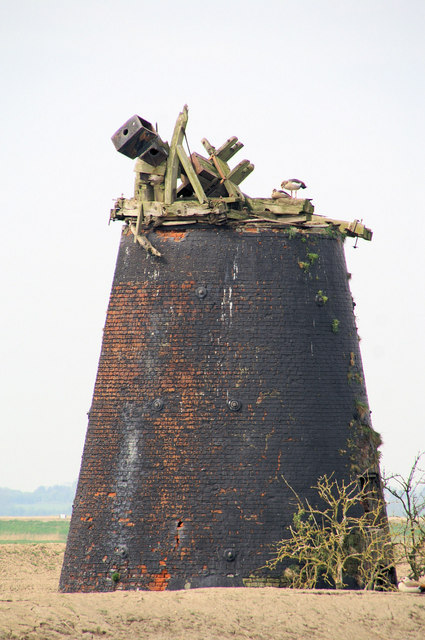
- Six Mile House Mill, May 2008
- Interactive map of Six Mile House Mill, Chedgrave

Origin
- Mill name: Six Mile House Mill
- Mill location: Chedgrave, Norfolk, United Kingdom
- Grid reference: TG 4521 0340
- Coordinates: 52°34′23″N 1°37′04″E

Information
- Purpose: Drainage mill
- Type: Tower mill
- Storeys: Four storeys
- No. of sails: Four
- Type of sails: Common sails
- Windshaft: Cast iron
- Winding: Tailpole
- Type of pump: Scoopwheel

Six Mile House, Chedgrave Detached or Hewitt's Mill is a Grade II listed tower mill at Chedgrave, Norfolk, United Kingdom. A drainage mill, it survives in a derelict condition with most of its machinery.

== History ==
Six Mile House Mill, also known as Chedgrave Detached Mill and Hewitt's Mill, may have been standing in the 1820s. It was rebuilt in the 1870s. The mill was listed Grade II on 22 February 1988. Flood alleviation work in the 2000s left the mill isolated in a pond. It was sold in June 2022 to Karl Phillips, who stated his intent was to fully restore the mill.

== Description ==
Six Mile House Mill is a four storey tower mill. It had a boat shape cap which was winded by tailpole. Four Common sails were carried on a cast iron windshaft. The wooden brake wheel was of clasp arm construction. The brake wheel drove a cast iron wallower at the top of the wooden upright shaft. The mill drove a scoopwheel.
