= Six Mile House Mill, Halvergate =

Windmill in Halvergate, Norfolk, England

Six Mile House Mill
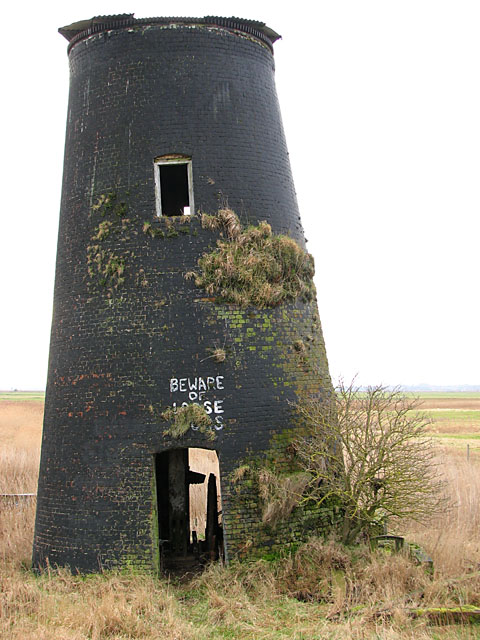
- Six Mile House Mill, January 2011
- Interactive map of Six Mile House Mill

Origin
- Mill name: Six Mile House Mill; Lake's Mill; Perry's Mill
- Mill location: Halvergate, Norfolk, United Kingdom
- Grid reference: TG 4612 0985
- Coordinates: 52°37′49″N 1°38′07″E

Information
- Purpose: Drainage mill
- Type: Tower mill
- Storeys: Three storeys
- No. of sails: Four
- Type of sails: Patent sails
- Windshaft: Cast iron
- Winding: Fantail
- Type of pump: scoopwheel

Six Mile House Mill, also known as Lake's Mill and Perry's Mill, is a Grade II listed tower mill in Halvergate, Norfolk, United Kingdom. Standing in the 1880s, it has been conserved.

== History ==
Six Mile House Mill was marked on the 1884 Ordnance Survey map. Arthur C. Smith surveyed the mill on 10 July 1973. He describe it as a derelict tower mill without its cap, but having four patent sails and its machinery. The mill was listed Grade II on 26 February 1987. Smith surveyed the mill again on 14 July 1987. At that time, the mill only had two sails. By 2023, the mill tower had been conserved, with new doors and windows fitted and a flat roof put on top of the tower.

== Description ==
Six Mile House Mill is a three storey tower mill. Four double Patent sails were carried on a cast iron windshaft. The sails had nine bays of three shutters. The mill was winded by a fantail. The upright shaft is of wood. The crown wheel and pit wheel are of cast iron. The mill drove a scoopwheel.
