= Clippesby Windmill =

Mill building in Ashby, Norfolk, England

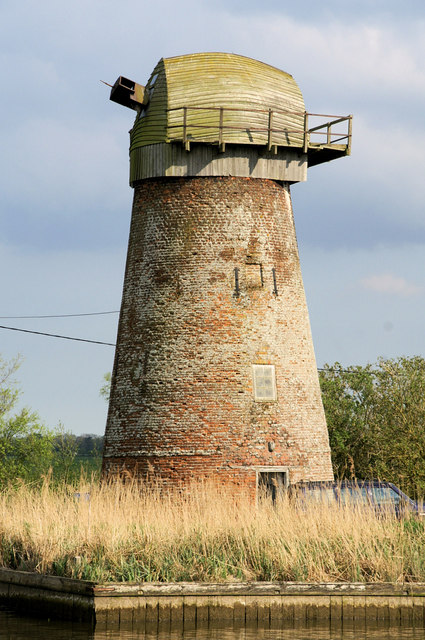
- Clippesby Mill, May 2008
- Interactive map of Clippesby Windmill

Origin
- Mill name: Clippesby Mill
- Mill location: Ashby, Norfolk, United Kingdom
- Grid reference: TG 4092 1281
- Coordinates: 52°39′35″N 1°33′40″E

Information
- Purpose: Drainage mill
- Type: Tower mill
- Storeys: Four storeys
- No. of sails: Four
- Type of sails: Patent sails
- Windshaft: Cast iron
- Winding: Fantail
- Type of pump: Scoopwheel

Clippesby Mill is a Grade II listed tower mill in Ashby, Norfolk, United Kingdom. A drainage mill, it was converted to a basic weekend retreat in 1958, retaining most of its machinery.

== History ==
It is not known when Clippesby Mill was built. Evidence shows that the mill was originally a three storey mill. It was later raised by 8 feet (2.4 m), possibly in 1841 as a brick in the mill has this date carved into it.

The mill was converted to holiday accommodation in 1958, at a basic level. The mill was struck by lightning in 1978 and the remains of the stocks were subsequently removed. The mill was listed Grade II on 4 December 1987.

== Description ==
Clippesby Mill is a four story tower mill. The tower is 41 feet 0 inches (12.50 m) tall and 21 feet 0 inches (6.40 m) outside diameter at the base. The walls are 3 feet (910 mm) thick at ground floor level. The tower is 13 feet 0 inches (3.96 m) diameter at the top. The mill has a boat shape cap with petticoat and gallery. Four Patent sails were carried on a cast iron windshaft. The mill was winded by a fantail. The windshaft carries a wooden clasp arm brake wheel. This drives a cast iron wallower at the top of the upright shaft, which is of pine. A crown wheel is at the bottom of the upright shaft. This drove the pit wheel, drive shaft and scoopwheel.
