= Caldecott Mill, Fritton =

Windmill in Fritton, Norfolk, England

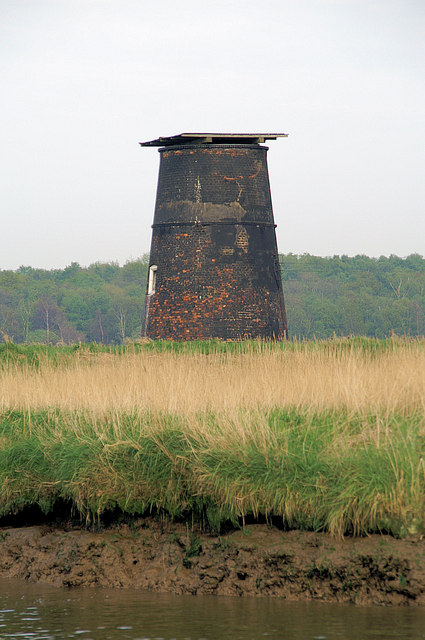
- Caldecott Mill, May 2008
- Interactive map of Caldecott Mill, Fritton

Origin
- Mill name: Bell Hill Mill, Caldecott Mill
- Mill location: Fritton, Norfolk, United Kingdom
- Grid reference: TG 4642 0210
- Coordinates: 52°32′38″N 1°38′05″E
- Year built: 1844

Information
- Purpose: Drainage mill
- Type: Tower mill
- Storeys: Three storeys
- No. of sails: Four
- Type of sails: Patent sails
- Windshaft: Cast iron
- Winding: Fantail
- Type of pump: Scoopwheel

Bell Hill or Caldecott Mill is a Grade II listed tower mill at Fritton, Norfolk, United Kingdom. Built as a drainage mill in 1844, it worked until the 1930s. The empty tower survives.

== History ==
Caldecott Mill was built in 1844, draining into the River Waveney. It worked until c.1935. Two iron band were placed around the tower in 1937. The mill was fitted with a new stock and the pit wheel was recogged at that time. Arthur C. Smith surveyed the mill on 5 May 1975. He described it as a derelict tower mill without cap or sails, but retaining the windshaft, brake wheel and internal machinery. The mill was listed Grade II on 15 July 1988. Smith surveyed the mill again on 16 May 1989, noting that the mill had been preserved and fitted with a temporary aluminium cap. In 1991, a fire gutted the mill, destroying the remaining machinery.

== Description ==
Caldecott Mill is a three storey tower mill. It had a boat shape cap with petticoat. Four Patent sails were carried on a cast iron windshaft. The upright shaft was of wood. The mill drove a scoopwheel. The pit wheel, on the scoopwheel shaft, was 10 feet 0 inches (3.05 m) diameter.
