= Tunstall Dyke tower mill =

Windmill in Norfolk, England

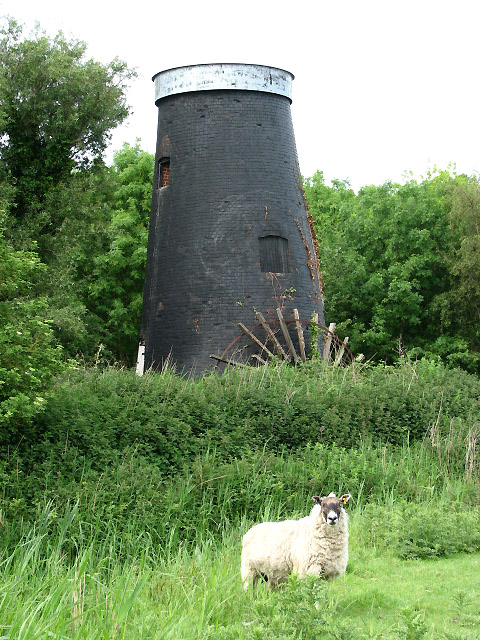
- Tunstall Dyke tower mill, May 2008
- Interactive map of Tunstall Dyke tower mill

Origin
- Mill name: Tunstall Dyke tower mill
- Mill location: Tunstall, Norfolk, United Kingdom
- Grid reference: TG 4221 0924
- Coordinates: 52°37′38″N 1°34′40″E
- Year built: 19th century

Information
- Purpose: Drainage mill
- Type: Tower mill
- Storeys: Four storeys
- No. of sails: Four
- Winding: Fantail
- Type of pump: Scoopwheel
- Scoopwheel diameter: 13 feet 4 inches (4.06 m)

Tunstall Dyke tower mill is a Grade II listed tower mill at Tunstall, Norfolk, United Kingdom. It has been conserved.

== History ==
Tunstall Dyke mill was marked on the 1884 and 1905 Ordnance Survey maps. Arthur C. Smith surveyed the mill on 17 September 1973. He described the mill as a derelict shell. The mill was listed Grade II on 26 February 1987. Smith surveyed the mill again on 5 July 1988 and 21 May 1989. He again described the mill as a derelict shell, but noted that it retained some of its internal machinery and scoopwheel. The mill had been conserved by 1994.

== Description ==
Tunstall Dyke mill is a four-storey tower mill. The tower is 16 feet 0 inches (4.88 m) internal diameter at ground level, with walls 23 inches (580 mm) thick. The mill would have had four sails and been winded by a fantail. The pit wheel is 7 feet 0 inches (2.13 m) diameter. It drove a 13 feet 4 inches (4.06 m) diameter scoopwheel.
