= Mautby Marsh Drainage Mill =

Windmill in Norfolk, England

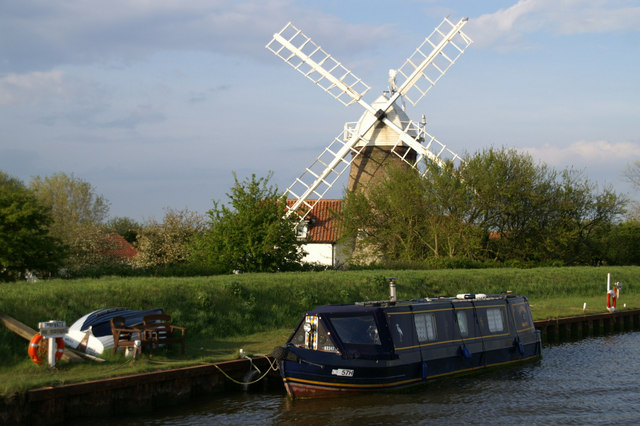
- Mautby Marsh Mill, May 2008
- Interactive map of Mautby Marsh Drainage Mill

Origin
- Mill name: Mautby Marsh Mill
- Mill location: Mautby, Norfolk, United Kingdom
- Grid reference: TG 4895 0992
- Coordinates: 52°37′48″N 1°40′38″E
- Year built: Mid-19th century

Information
- Purpose: Drainage mill
- Type: Tower mill
- Storeys: Three storeys
- No. of sails: Four
- Type of sails: Patent sails
- Windshaft: Cast iron
- Winding: Fantail
- Fantail blades: Eight
- Auxiliary power: Oil engine
- Type of pump: Scoopwheel

Mautby Marsh Drainage Windmill is a Grade II listed tower mill at Mautby, Norfolk, United Kingdom. A drainage mill, it has been converted to holiday accommodation.

== History ==
A drainage mill was standing in Mautby in 1783. This appears to have been a trestle mill. The mill was built in the mid-19th century. It is marked on the 1884 Ordnance Survey map. In 1919, Great Yarmouth brewers E. Lacon & Son bought a Ruston & Hornsby oil engine for the mill. It was delivered to the mill by Thomas Smithdale & Sons, millwrights of Acle and installed on 11 November. The engine was in use until 1968. Arthur C. Smith surveyed the mill on 10 July 1973. He described it as a derelict tower missing its cap, sails and fantail. A quarter of one of the stocks was missing. The mill retained its machinery and scoopwheel. In 1982, the mill was converted to residential use. A new cap, sails and fantail were fitted and an extension was built against the tower. The upright shaft was removed during the conversion. The mill is used as holiday accommodation. The mill was listed Grade II on 15 July 1988.

== Description ==
Mautby Marsh Mill is a three-storey tower mill. It has a boat shape cap with petticoat and gallery. Four patent sails are carried on a cast iron windshaft. The mill is winded by an eight-blade fantail. It drove a scoopwheel, which was not retained during the conversion. Nor was the sixteed-sided wooden upright shaft.
