= North Mill, Runham =

Windmill in Norfolk, England

- North Mill, January 2011
- Interactive map of North Mill, Runham

Origin
- Mill name: North Mill, Child's Mill
- Mill location: Runham, Norfolk, United Kingdom
- Grid reference: TG 4700 0998
- Coordinates: 52°37′54″N 1°38′53″E
- Operator: Norfolk Windmills Trust
- Year built: 1852

Information
- Purpose: Drainage mill
- Type: Tower mill
- Storeys: Three storeys
- No. of sails: Four
- Type of sails: Patent sails
- Windshaft: Cast iron
- Winding: Fantail
- Fantail blades: Eight
- Auxiliary power: Paraffin engine
- Type of pump: Scoopwheel

North or Child's Mill is a Grade II listed tower mill at Runham, Norfolk, United Kingdom. A drainage mill built in 1852, it worked until 1939. The mill has been restored.

== History ==
The first mill stood a little to the east of the current mill. It was built before 1805. It ceased working in 1846 and was replaced by a steam engine. In 1851, the Drainage Commissioners advertised for contractors to build a new mill.

The new mill was built to the design of millwright and architect William Thorold by Thomas Smithdale, millwright of Norwich. In 1896, the fantail was repaired by W. T. England, millwright of Great Yarmouth, a new fan star was fitted. A paraffin engine was installed as auxiliary power in 1916. The mill worked by wind until 1939, when it suffered damage to the brake wheel. An electric pump at Herringby replaced the mill and the sails were removed. Arthur C. Smith surveyed the mill on 10 July 1973. He described the mill as having lost most of its cap. It retained the stocks, fan cradle and its machinery. In 1983, South Walsham millwright Richard Seago commenced a restoration of the mill, then in the care of the Norfolk Windmills Trust. A new cap and fantail were fitted, but funding for new sails was not available. The mill was listed Grade II on 15 July 1988. The mill was opened to the public for the first time on 14 July 2013.

== Description ==
North Mill is a three storey tower mill. The tower is about 30 feet (9.1 m) tall. The mill has a boat shape cap with petticoat. Four patent sails were carried on a cast iron windshaft. The mill is winded by an eight-bladed fantail. The windshaft carries a wooden clasp arm brake wheel. This drives a cast iron wallower at the top of the cast iron upright shaft. The mill drove an internal scoopwheel. The pit wheel, shaft and scoopwheel have been removed.
