= Boyce's Mill, Norton Subcourse =

Windmill in Norfolk, England

- Boyce's Mill, March 2011
- Interactive map of Boyce's Mill, Norton Subcourse

Origin
- Mill name: Boyce's Mill
- Mill location: Norton Subcourse, Norfolk, United Kingdom
- Grid reference: TG 4017 0080
- Coordinates: 52°33′06″N 1°32′30″E
- Year built: 19th century

Information
- Purpose: Drainage mill
- Type: Tower mill
- No. of sails: Four
- Type of sails: Patent sails
- Windshaft: Cast iron
- Auxiliary power: Steam engine
- Type of pump: scoopwheel
- Scoopwheel diameter: 12 feet 0 inches (3.66 m)

Boyce's Mill is a tower mill at Norton Subcourse, Norfolk, United Kingdom. A drainage mill, the derelict stump survives.

== History ==
Boyce's Mill was standing in 1861, when Thomas Smithdale, the Norwich millwright quoted for repairs necessary to return the mill to working order. A new cap, sails, internal machinery and scoopwheel were quoted for, as was a portable steam engine and building to house it at a cost of 512. 1. 0. Smithdale quoted for Common sails, although the mill is known to have carried Patent sails. The steam engine building had a chimney 34 feet (10 m) tall. The engine was a 8 hp portable. It had a 9 1/4 inches (230 mm) diameter cylinder. The flywheel was 8 feet 0 inches (2.44 m) diameter. It had a Cornish boiler 12 feet 0 inches (3.66 m) long and 4 feet 0 inches (1.22 m) diameter.

The mill was marked on the 1884 Ordnance Survey map. It was sketched in March 1937 by artist Karl Wood. The mill was a two-storey stump by then, in good order. Arthur C. Smith surveyed the mill on 14 May 1977. The mill was then derelict.

== Description ==
Boyce's Mill is a tower mill. Four patent sails were carried on a cast iron windshaft, which also carried a cast iron brake wheel. This drove a cast iron wallower at the top of the upright shaft. The cast iron shaft that the 12 feet 0 inches (3.66 m) scoopwheel was on was 11 feet 0 inches (3.35 m) long and 7 inches (180 mm) diameter. A portable steam engine was used for auxiliary power.
