= Horning Ferry Windpump =

Windmill in Horning, Norfolk, England

- Horning Ferry Windpump, October 2010
- Interactive map of Horning Ferry Windpump

Origin
- Mill name: Horning Ferry Windpump
- Mill location: Horning, Norfolk, United Kingdom
- Grid reference: TG 3450 1669
- Coordinates: 52°48′41″N 1°28′10″E
- Year built: C.1880

Information
- Purpose: Drainage mill
- Type: Smock mill
- Storeys: Three storey smock
- Base storeys: Low brick base
- Smock sides: Eight
- No. of sails: Four
- Type of sails: Originally Patent sails, now Common sails
- Windshaft: Cast iron
- Winding: Fantail
- Fantail blades: Seven
- Type of pump: Appold turbine

Horning Ferry Windpump is a Grade II listed windmill in Horning, Norfolk, United Kingdom. Built c. 1880, it was converted to residential use in 1935.

== History ==
Horning Ferry Windpump was built c.1880 by Daniel England, the Ludham millwright. It was converted to residential use in 1935. The mill was extended at ground floor level, and the smock reprofiled to the second floor level. The mill was listed Grade II on 12 May 1987.

== Description ==
As built, Horning Ferry Windpump was a three storey smock mill on a low brick base. It had a boat shape cap. Four double Patent sails were carried on a cast iron windshaft. The sails had six bays of three shutters. The mill was winded by a seven-blade fantail. The internal gearing survives. The mill drove an Appold Turbine.. As converted, the mill has Common sails.
