= Palmer's Drainage Windmill =

Windmill in Norfolk, England

Palmer’s Mill Windpump
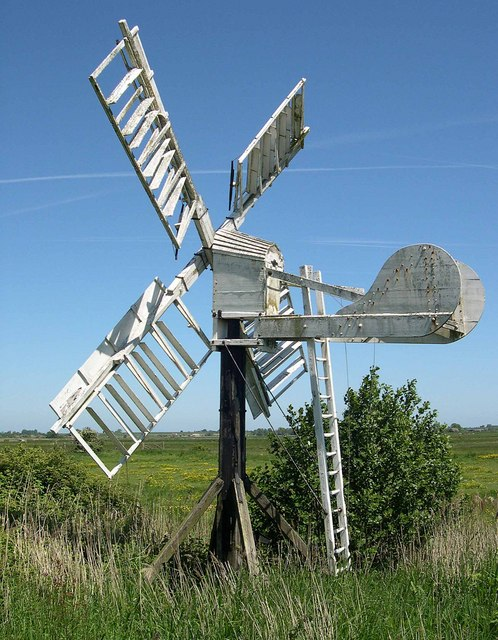
- Palmer's Mill, June 2006
- Interactive map of Palmer’s Mill Windpump

Origin
- Mill location: Upton, Norfolk, United Kingdom
- Grid reference: TG 405 129
- Coordinates: 52.658164°N 1.54315°E

Information
- Purpose: Drainage mill
- Type: Hollow post mill
- No. of sails: Four
- Type of sails: Patent sails
- Windshaft: Cast iron
- Winding: Tailfin
- Type of pump: Plunger pump

Palmer's Drainage Windmill is located to the north of Upton Dyke close to the village of Upton in the English county of Norfolk. Upton Dyke runs westerly from the River Bure in the civil parish of Upton with Fishley . The Drainage mill can be found to the east of the village of Upton.

== Description ==
Palmer's Drainage Windmill is of an interesting design being one of only two ‘Hollow Post’ drainage mills left on the broads, the other being Clayrack Drainage Mill. The mill has a miniature cap and sails based on its more traditional big brother tower drainage mills which can be seen on other parts of the Norfolk Broads. It is winded by a pair of tail vanes.

== History ==
Also like Clayrack drainage windmill, Palmer's drainage windmill is not on its original position. It was moved in 1976 from its previous site near Acle.
