= Starston Windpump =

Windmill in Starston, Norfolk, England

Starston Wind Pump
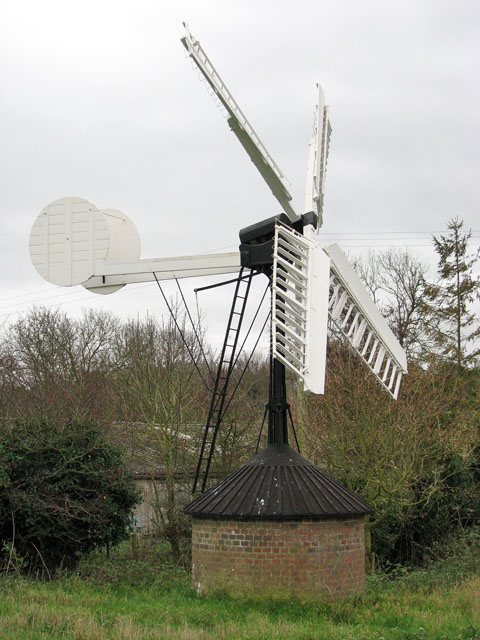
- Interactive map of Starston Wind Pump

Origin
- Mill location: 330 yards south west of the Church of St Margaret, Pulham Road, Starston
- Grid reference: TM2384
- Coordinates: 52.411382°N 1.280686°E
- Year built: 1850

Starston Wind Pump is a hollow post mill for pumping water, situated west of the village of Starston in Norfolk, England. The Pump is 330 yards away from the parish church of Saint Margaret in Mill Field. The windpump is a Grade II listed building and a scheduled monument. After some years on the Heritage at Risk Register because of its poor condition, it was restored in 2010.

== History ==
This unusual windmill pump was built c.1850 by the Suffolk Millwrights Whitmore and Binyon and it was built to pump water from the nearby Beck to fill up massive water tanks, one on top of Starston Place house and one in the nearby farmyard of Home Farm. So efficient were the large canvas and wood sails of this little windmill, that although there was a stationary engine which could work the pumps, it was seldom used. However, with the installation a piped supply of water to the village and district the use of the pump was discontinued. The tank on top of the house provided the main supply of water for this very large house. The Farmyard tank supplied the water for the 200 head of milking cows and fattening bullocks on the farm, and also for the large herd of pigs that were also kept at Home Farm. Another use for this water was to maintain the level of water in the horse pond from an overflow pipe from the main tank. In 2019 the Windmill was vandalised by some local youth, However no damage was sustained
