= Toft Monks Windpump =

Windmill in Haddiscoe, Norfolk, England

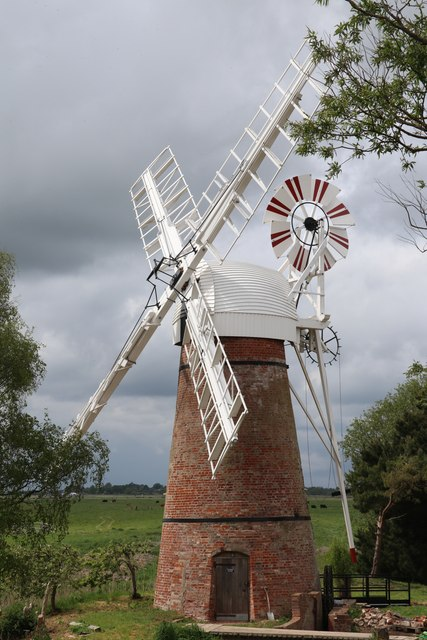
- Toft Monks Windpump, May 2026
- Interactive map of Toft Monks Windpump

Origin
- Mill name: Toft Monks Windpump
- Mill location: Haddiscoe, Norfolk, United Kingdom
- Grid reference: TG4480 0093
- Coordinates: 52°33′04″N 1°36′35″E

Information
- Purpose: Drainage mill
- Type: Tower mill
- Storeys: Three storeys
- No. of sails: Four
- Type of sails: Patent sails
- Windshaft: Cast iron
- Winding: Fantail
- Fantail blades: Eight
- Type of pump: Scoopwheel

Toft Monks Windpump is a Grade II listed tower mill at Haddiscoe, Norfolk, United Kingdom. A drainage mill, it has been restored.

== History ==
Toft Monks Windpump was derelict by 1964. Arthur C. Smith surveyed the mill on 4 August 1975. At that time, the mill had its cap frame and remains of the fantail. It had three sails and all internal machinery. In 1974, planning permission was granted to convert the mill to residential use. The remains of the cap had been removed by 1980, and a new cap placed on the mill by 1982. This was later painted black. Smith surveyed the mill again on 15 May 1989. He noted that the mill had been converted. It had a cap, sails and fantail. Two blades of the fantail were missing, having been damaged in the great storm of 1987.

The mill was listed Grade II on 22 February 1988. The original plans for the conversion included adding a building to the tower. In 2023, new owners submitted plans to restore the mill, and build a house away from the tower. These plans were approved by the Broads Authority, with the condition that the restoration of the mill be completed before the house could be built. A new cap and sails were fitted to the mill in September 2024. Restoration of the mill was completed in November 2025.

== Description ==
Toft Monks windpump is a three storey tower mill. The tower is 27 feet 9 inches (8.46 m) tall. It is 13 feet 9 inches (4.19 m) internal diameter at ground floor level, with walls 2 feet (610 mm) thick. It has a boat shape cap with petticoat and gallery. Four double patent sails are carried in a cast iron windshaft. The sails have eight bays of three shutters. The mill is winded by an eight-blade fantail. The pit wheel is 6 feet 4 inches (1.93 m) diameter. The mill drives a scoopwheel.

== External link ==
- Video of the mill turning
