= North Mill, Reedham =

Windmill in Norfolk, England

- North Mill, March 2011
- Interactive map of North Mill, Reedham

Origin
- Mill name: North Mill
- Mill location: Reedham, Norfolk, United Kingdom
- Grid reference: TG 4438 0361
- Coordinates: 52°34′31″N 1°36′19″E
- Year built: 19th century

Information
- Purpose: Drainage mill
- Type: Tower mill
- Storeys: Three storeys
- No. of sails: Four
- Auxiliary power: Steam engine
- Type of pump: Scoopwheel

North Mill is a tower mill at Reedham, Norfolk, United Kingdom. A drainage mill, the empty tower survives.

== History ==
North Mill was built in the 19th century. A steam engine was installed as auxiliary power in 1880. The mill had ceased working by 1904. The steam engine was scrapped in 1965.

Arthur C. Smith surveyed the mill on 10 June 1974. He described it as a derelict, empty tower with a lean.. He surveyed the mill again on 30 June 1988 and 14 June 1989. He noted that the tower was is poor condition, with the door openings enlarged. The tower stood to its full height, retaining part of the curb. By 2023, the tower had been repaired, but left unroofed.

== Description ==
North Mill is a three storey tower mill. The tower is about 23 feet (7.0 m) tall. It is 10 feet 0 inches (3.05 m) internal diameter at the base, with walls 22 inches (560 mm) thick. The mill had four sails. It drove a scoopwheel.
