= Lambridge Mill =

Grade II listed windmill in Sea Palling, Norfolk, UK

- Lambridge Mill, March 2009
- Interactive map of Lambridge Mill

Origin
- Mill name: Lambridge Mill; Lambrigg Mill
- Mill location: Sea Palling, Norfolk, United Kingdom
- Grid reference: TG 4318 2522
- Coordinates: 52°46′11″N 1°36′13″E
- Year built: C.1865

Information
- Purpose: Drainage mill
- Type: Tower mill
- Storeys: Four storeys
- No. of sails: Four
- Type of sails: Patent sails
- Windshaft: Cast iron
- Winding: Fantail
- Scoopwheel diameter: Scoopwheel

Lambridge Mill also known as Lambrigg Mill Grade II listed tower mill at Sea Palling, Norfolk, United Kingdom. A drainage mill, it was built c. 1865 and worked until the 1930s. The mill has been converted to residential accommodation.

== History ==
Lambridge Mill was built c.1865. The mill was built to drain the Brograve Levels into the Waxham New Cut. It worked until c.1937, when it was severely damaged. Arthur C. Smith surveyed the mill on 10 April 1972. He described the mill as derelict with the fragmentary remains of one sail. The mill had no cap, but retained its windshaft and the remains of the brake wheel. Other machinery survived in the mill. The mill was listed Grade II on 30 September 1987. Smith surveyed the mill again on 24 May 1985. He stated that the mill had been converted to residential use, but retained the appearance of a derelict mill.

== Description ==
Lambridge Mill is a four storey tower mill. It had a boat shaped cap. Four Patent sails were carried on a cast iron windshaft. The mill was winded by a fantail. There are remains of the brake wheel. The wallower, upright shaft, crown wheel and pit wheel survive. The mill drove an internal scoopwheel, now missing.
