= Polkey's Mill, Reedham =

Windmill in Reedham, Norfolk, England

- Polkey's Mill, March 2011
- Interactive map of Polkey's Mill, Reedham

Origin
- Mill name: Polkey's Mill, South Mill
- Mill location: Reedham, Norfolk, United Kingdom
- Grid reference: TG 4442 0349
- Coordinates: 52°34′26″N 1°36′22″E
- Operator: Norfolk Windmills Trust
- Year built: 19th century

Information
- Purpose: Drainage mill
- Type: Tower mill
- Storeys: Four storeys
- No. of sails: Four
- Type of sails: Patent sails
- Windshaft: Cast iron
- Winding: Fantail
- Fantail blades: Eight
- Auxiliary power: Steam engine
- Type of pump: Scoopwheel

Polkey's, Reedham Hall or South Mill is a Grade II* listed tower mill at Reedham, Norfolk, United Kingdom. Built in the 19th century, it worked until 1941. The mill has been restored to working order.

== History ==
The first mill on this site was a smock mill. It was marked on Faden's 1797 map of Norfolk. As built, Polkey's mill was a three-storey tower mill with Common sails. Beams from the smock mill were re-used in the construction of the mill. The mill was later raised by a storey and Patent sails were fitted. In 1881, a steam engine was added as auxiliary power. The mill worked until 1941, when a diesel-powered pump replaced it.

The steam engine was scrapped in 1965. Arthur C. Smith surveyed the mill on 10 June 1974. He described the mill as a derelict without its cap, retaining four Patent sails in a fragmented condition and its machinery. A temporary aluminium cap was fitted by Norfolk County Council in 1985. The mill was listed Grade II on 26 February 1987. Smith surveyed the mill again on 30 June 1988 and 14 June 1989. He described the mill as protected, with an aluminium cap, two stocks and the remains of three sails. The mill retained all machinery except for the pit wheel. The mill's listing was upgraded to II* in June 2001. The mill was restored to working order between 2002 and 2005.

== Description ==
Polkey's Mill is a four-storey tower mill. It has a boat shape cap with petticoat. Four Patent sails are carried on a cast iron windshaft. The mill is winded by an eight-bladed fantail. The windshaft carries a cast iron brake wheel. This drives a cast iron wallower at the top of the wooden upright shaft. At the bottom of the upright shaft, a cast iron crown wheel drives a cast iron pit wheel, which drives the scoopwheel.
