= Langley Detached Windmill =

Windmill in Norfolk, England

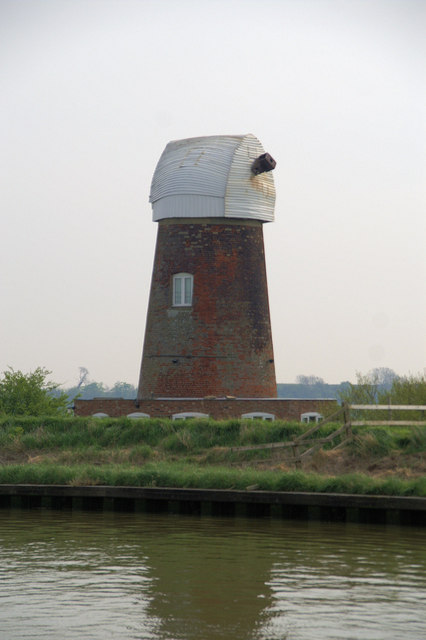
- Langley Detached Mill, May 2008
- Interactive map of Langley Detached Windmill

Origin
- Mill name: Langley Detached Mill; Red Mill
- Mill location: Langley, Norfolk, United Kingdom
- Grid reference: TG 4655 0447
- Coordinates: 52°34′55″N 1°38′17″E
- Year built: Mid 19th century

Information
- Purpose: Drainage mill
- Type: Tower mill
- Storeys: Four storeys
- No. of sails: Four
- Windshaft: Cast iron
- Winding: Fantail

Langley Detached Windmill, or the Red Mill, is a Grade II listed tower mill at Langley, Norfolk, United Kingdom. A drainage mill built in the mid-19th century, it worked until c.1940. It has been converted to holiday accommodation.

== History ==
Langley Detached Windmill was built between 1840 and 1880. It worked until c.1940. It was also known as the Red Mill, due to its cap being painted red. Arthur C. Smith surveyed the mill on 10 June 1974. He described the mill as preserved and retaining its cap, windshaft and brake wheel. The cap was wearing faded red paint. A thatched extension had been built around the bottom of the tower. The mill was listed Grade II on 25 February 1988. The mill is used as holiday accommodation.

== Description ==
Langley Detached Windmill is a four storey tower mill. It has a boat shape cap with petticoat. Four sails were carried on a cast iron windshaft. The mill was winded by a fantail. It retains some of its machinery.
