= North Mill, Ludham Bridge =

Windmill in Ludham, Norfolk, England

- North Mill, February 2012
- Interactive map of North Mill, Ludham Bridge

Origin
- Mill name: North Mill
- Mill location: Ludham, Norfolk, United Kingdom
- Grid reference: TG 3718 1722
- Coordinates: 52°42′02″N 1°30′31″E

Information
- Purpose: Drainage mill
- Type: Tower mill
- Storeys: Three storeys
- No. of sails: Four
- Winding: Fantail

North Mill is a tower mill at Ludham, Norfolk, United Kingdom. A drainage mill, it was fortified by the Home Guard during World War II for use as an observation post. The derelict tower survives.

== History ==
North Mill was marked on the 1905 Ordnance Survey map. It had ceased to work by 1934. C.1942, the mill was taken over by the Home Guard, who converted the base to a pillbox. A spigot mortar was placed by the tower. Arthur C. Smith surveyed the mill on 24 September 1971 and again on 23 May 1978. He described the mill as a derelict, leaning tower with some beams inside. He surveyed the mill again on 23 May 1986, taking detailed measurements.

== Description ==
North Mill is a three storey tower mill. The tower is about 20 feet (6.1 m) tall. It is 12 feet 4 inches (3.76 m) outside diameter at the base, with walls 18 inches (460 mm) thick. The mill had a boat shape cap with gallery. It was winded by a fantail.
