= Reedham Ferry Drainage Mill =

Former windmill in Norfolk, England

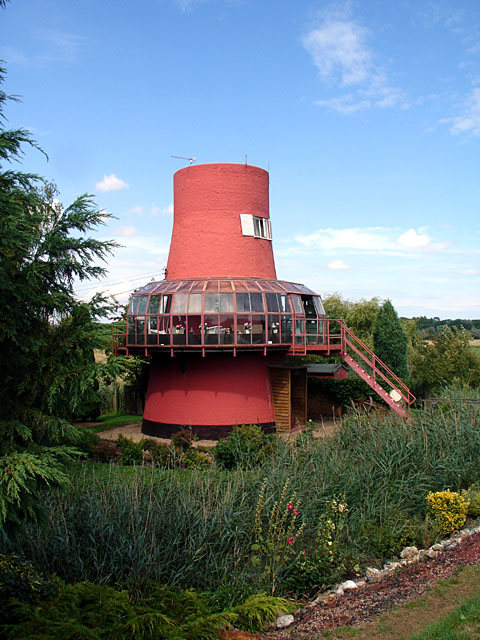
- Reedham Ferry Drainage Mill, August 2006
- Interactive map of Reedham Ferry Drainage Mill

Origin
- Grid reference: TG 4090 0169
- Coordinates: 52°33′35″N 1°33′09″E
- Year built: 1840

Information
- Purpose: Drainage mill
- Type: Tower mill
- Storeys: Three storeys
- No. of sails: Four
- Type of sails: Common sails, later Patent sails
- Windshaft: Cast iron
- Winding: Tailpole, later a fantail
- Fantail blades: Eight
- Type of pump: Scoopwheel, later an Appold turbine

The Reedham Ferry Drainage Mill, also known as North Mill and The Red Mill, is a former drainage windmill found on the River Yare on The Broads at Reedham, Norfolk. It is now a privately owned holiday home.

== History ==
The mill was built in the 1840s. It was modernised in the 1890s by Englands, millwrights of Acle. The mill worked until c.1936. In the late 1950s it was converted by Geoffrey Livingston, a businessman from Leicester into a holiday home.

== Description ==
As built, the mill had four Common sails and was winded by a tailpole. It drove a scoopwheel. As modernised, the mill had a boat shape cap. Four Patent sails were carried on a cast iron windshaft. The mill was winded by an eight-bladed fantail. It drove an Appold turbine.

== In media ==
The Reedham Ferry Drainage Mill is seen in episode 2 of the UK TV series, Interceptor.

== Gallery ==
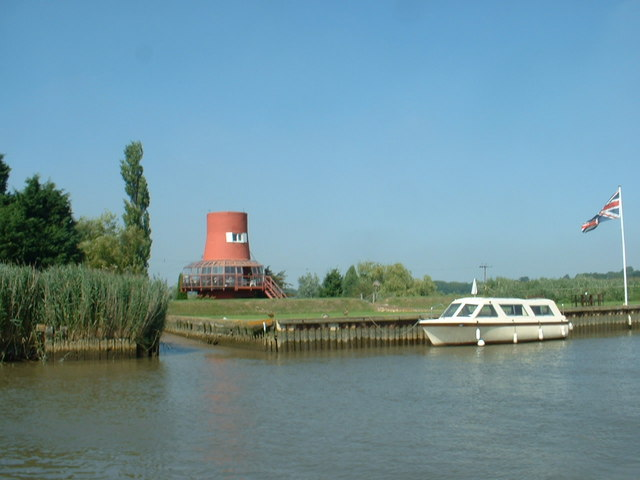
The Red Mill from the River Yare

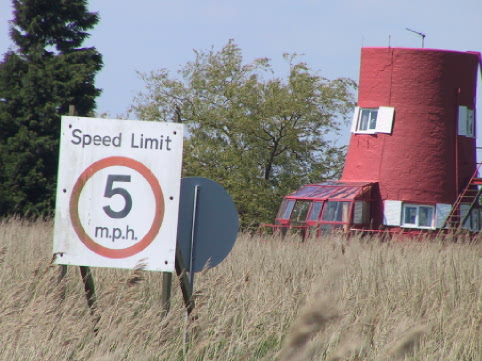
The Red Mill
