= Norfolk Windmills Trust =

British charitable organization

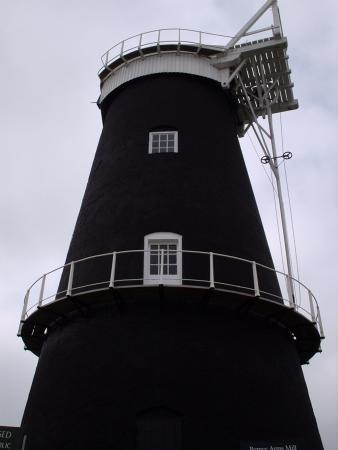
Berney Arms Mill

The Norfolk Windmills Trust is a charity based in Norfolk, England, which restores and cares for windmills in that county.

Mills in its care (but not necessarily owned) include those at:

- Ashtree Farm Mill
- Berney Arms (English Heritage - pictured)
- Billingford
- Clayrack
- Cley next the Sea
- Denver Windmill
- Dereham
- Garboldisham
- Great Bircham
- Gunton Park Sawmill
- Hobb's Mill
- Horsey (NT)
- Letheringsett Watermill
- Little Cressingham
- Old Buckenham
- Paston (privately owned)
- Starston
- Stracey Arms
- Sutton
- Wicklewood

== See also ==
- List of drainage windmills in Norfolk
- List of windmills
- Windmills in the United Kingdom
