= Grade II* listed buildings in North Norfolk =

There are over 20,000 Grade II* listed buildings in England. This page is a list of these buildings in the district of North Norfolk in Norfolk.

== North Norfolk ==
Name	Location	Type	Completed (Note: The date given is the date used by Historic England as significant for the initial building or that of an important part in the structure's description.)	Date designated	Grid ref. (Note: The grid reference is based on the British national grid reference system, sometimes known as OSGB36, used by the Ordnance Survey.) Geo-coordinates	Entry number (Note: The "List Entry Number" is a unique number assigned to each listed building and scheduled monument by Historic England.)	Image
Church of All Saints	Thwaite, Alby with Thwaite, North Norfolk	Church and Schoolroom	1835	4 October 1960	TG1928433392; 52°51′12″N 1°15′20″E	1049886	Church of All Saints More images
Church of St Ethelbert	Alby, Alby with Thwaite	Parish Church	Medieval	4 October 1960	TG2026733618; 52°51′18″N 1°16′13″E	1049885	Church of St Ethelbert More images
Church of St Mary	Aldborough	Parish Church	Medieval	4 October 1960	TG1790933810; 52°51′28″N 1°14′07″E	1373470	Church of St Mary More images
Beeston Hall	Ashmanhaugh	House	1784-87	2 April 1976	TG3317521393; 52°44′23″N 1°27′10″E	1049924	Beeston Hall More images
Church of St Swithin	Ashmanhaugh	Parish Church	12th century	16 April 1955	TG3144921161; 52°44′19″N 1°25′38″E	1049928	Church of St Swithin More images
Church of St John Baptist	Aylmerton	Parish Church	Medieval	4 October 1960	TG1819540067; 52°54′49″N 1°14′37″E	1373639	Church of St John Baptist More images
Cross	Aylmerton	Cross	Medieval	4 October 1960	TG1808638794; 52°54′08″N 1°14′29″E	1049519	Cross More images
Church of St Mary	Baconsthorpe	Parish Church	Medieval	4 October 1960	TG1274136862; 52°53′14″N 1°09′38″E	1049847	Church of St Mary More images
The Manor House	Baconsthorpe	House	Late 16th century	20 February 1952	TG1268336804; 52°53′12″N 1°09′35″E	1049848	The Manor House
Bacton Wood Watermill	Bacton	House	10th century	11 May 1987	TG2999830676; 52°49′28″N 1°24′44″E	1049148	Bacton Wood Watermill More images
Church of St Andrew	Bacton	Parish Church	14th century	16 April 1955	TG3358733698; 52°51′00″N 1°28′04″E	1373817	Church of St Andrew More images
North Gatehouse to Broomholm Priory	Bacton	Cluniac Monastery	15th century	11 May 1987	TG3470333364; 52°50′48″N 1°29′02″E	1049146	North Gatehouse to Broomholm Priory More images
Church of All Saints	North Barsham, Norfolk	Parish Church	13th century	6 March 1959	TF9156134963; 52°52′41″N 0°50′43″E	1373710	Church of All Saints More images
Church of All Saints	East Barsham, Barsham	Parish Church	Norman	6 March 1959	TF9164033706; 52°52′00″N 0°50′44″E	1373686	Church of All Saints More images
Church of the Assumption	West Barsham, Barsham	Parish Church	11th century	6 March 1959	TF9048433674; 52°52′01″N 0°49′42″E	1373673	Church of the Assumption More images
Capital 15m East of Manor House	Barton Turf	Column	C5-C6	12 May 1987	TG3530421061; 52°44′09″N 1°29′03″E	1373451	Upload Photo
Church of St Michael	Irstead, Barton Turf	Parish Church	14th century	16 April 1955	TG3653820464; 52°43′48″N 1°30′07″E	1049932	Church of St Michael More images
Turf Fen Windpump at TG 36971888	Barton Turf	Windpump	1880	12 May 1987	TG3696018822; 52°42′54″N 1°30′25″E	1049930	Turf Fen Windpump at TG 36971888 More images
Guildhall	Blakeney, North Norfolk	Merchants House	15th century	6 March 1959	TG0281744077; 52°57′21″N 1°01′04″E	1373987	Guildhall More images
Old Rectory	Blakeney	House	16th century	30 November 1951	TG0315643435; 52°56′59″N 1°01′21″E	1373978	Old Rectory
Quay House	Blakeney	House	18th century	30 November 1951	TG0270243984; 52°57′18″N 1°00′58″E	1039444	Quay House More images
Red House	Blakeney	House	Late 18th century	30 November 1951	TG0258444029; 52°57′19″N 1°00′52″E	1171139	Red House More images
The Friary	Blakeney	House	17th century	30 November 1951	TG0288244065; 52°57′20″N 1°01′08″E	1170123	Upload Photo
Church of All Saints	Bodham	Parish Church	Medieval	4 October 1960	TG1256838932; 52°54′21″N 1°09′34″E	1172366	Church of All Saints More images
Briningham House	Briningham	House	1838	16 January 1984	TG0358634275; 52°52′03″N 1°01′23″E	1170582	Upload Photo
Sharrington Hall	Sharrington, Brinton	House		30 November 1951	TG0317036940; 52°53′29″N 1°01′07″E	1049430	Sharrington Hall More images
Church of All Saints	Briston	Parish Church	c. 1300	6 March 1959	TG0623432573; 52°51′04″N 1°03′41″E	1049239	Church of All Saints More images
Church of St Peter	Brumstead	Parish Church	Early 14th century	16 April 1955	TG3699726786; 52°47′12″N 1°30′47″E	1049384	Church of St Peter More images
Cley Windmill	Cley Next the Sea	Apartment	18th century	20 February 1952	TG0449644043; 52°57′17″N 1°02′34″E	1049823	Cley Windmill More images
Church of St Giles	Colby	Parish Church	Medieval	4 October 1960	TG2202831126; 52°49′55″N 1°17′40″E	1373434	Church of St Giles More images
Church of St Peter	Corpusty	Parish Church	Medieval	4 October 1960	TG1149329417; 52°49′15″N 1°08′14″E	1049202	Church of St Peter More images
Cromer Hall including adjoining Stables	Cromer	Country House	1827	21 January 1977	TG2145841660; 52°55′36″N 1°17′36″E	1049011	Cromer Hall including adjoining Stables More images
Church of St Nicholas Shereford	Shereford, Dunton	Parish Church	Norman	6 March 1959	TF8872829630; 52°49′52″N 0°48′00″E	1049293	Church of St Nicholas Shereford More images
Church of St Peter	Dunton	Parish Church	c. 1300	6 March 1959	TF8794130315; 52°50′15″N 0°47′20″E	1171893	Church of St Peter More images
Church of St Mary	East Ruston	Parish Church	14th century	16 April 1955	TG3642528670; 52°48′13″N 1°30′22″E	1169839	Church of St Mary More images
Church of St Peter and St Paul	Edgefield	Parish Church	1883-4	20 February 1987	TG0935734200; 52°51′52″N 1°06′31″E	1049204	Church of St Peter and St Paul More images
Remains of Former Parish Church of St Peter and St Paul	Edgefield	Parish Church	11th century	4 October 1960	TG0861934707; 52°52′10″N 1°05′53″E	1049203	Remains of Former Parish Church of St Peter and St Paul More images
Church of St Margaret	Calthorpe, Erpingham	Parish Church	Medieval	4 October 1960	TG1813731756; 52°50′21″N 1°14′14″E	1049900	Church of St Margaret More images
Red Lion Hotel	Fakenham	Hotel	16th century	30 November 1951	TF9198229660; 52°49′49″N 0°50′54″E	1374006	Upload Photo
Thorpland Hall	Fakenham	House	16th century	30 November 1951	TF9365132170; 52°51′08″N 0°52′28″E	1171226	Thorpland Hall More images
Church of St Margaret	Felbrigg Park, Felbrigg	Parish Church	Medieval	4 October 1960	TG1975139013; 52°54′13″N 1°15′58″E	1373643	Church of St Margaret More images
Service Wing to East of Hall	Felbrigg Park, Felbrigg	Shop	C20	28 January 1988	TG1931639404; 52°54′26″N 1°15′36″E	1305519	Upload Photo
The Stables	Felbrigg Park, Felbrigg	House	1825	28 January 1988	TG1938039404; 52°54′26″N 1°15′39″E	1373646	Upload Photo
Church of St Andrew	Felmingham	Parish Church	Medieval	16 April 1955	TG2514029257; 52°48′50″N 1°20′22″E	1049164	Church of St Andrew More images
Church of St Margaret	Saxlingham, Field Dalling	Church	1593	2 July 1984	TG0261839605; 52°54′56″N 1°00′44″E	1049795	Church of St Margaret More images
Old Rectory	Great Snoring	Manor House	Late 15th century	30 November 1951	TF9455034519; 52°52′23″N 0°53′21″E	1373698	Upload Photo
Two Barns and Stable to West of the Old Rectory	Great Snoring	Timber Framed House	17th century	30 November 1951	TF9451334532; 52°52′23″N 0°53′19″E	1373699	Upload Photo
Church of All Saints	Gresham	Parish Church	Medieval	4 October 1960	TG1674238562; 52°54′03″N 1°13′16″E	1305530	Church of All Saints More images
Bale Hall	Bale, Gunthorpe	House	c. 1700	30 November 1951	TG0097337266; 52°53′43″N 0°59′11″E	1049402	Bale Hall
Church of St Mary	Gunthorpe	Parish Church	Perpendicular	6 March 1959	TG0120335228; 52°52′37″N 0°59′18″E	1305722	Church of St Mary More images
Church of St Bartholomew	Hanworth	Church	1766	4 October 1960	TG2031934902; 52°51′59″N 1°16′18″E	1049862	Church of St Bartholomew More images
Gunton Park	Gunton, Hanworth	Country House	c. 1742	20 February 1952	TG2277134112; 52°51′30″N 1°18′27″E	1049868	Gunton Park More images
Hanworth Lodge	Hanworth	Column	Late 18th century	24 April 1987	TG2209533584; 52°51′14″N 1°17′50″E	1049869	Hanworth Lodge More images
Sawmill	Hanworth	Saw Mill	Early 19th century	5 March 1982	TG2237733465; 52°51′10″N 1°18′05″E	1172478	Sawmill More images
The Stables	Hanworth	House	Late 18th century	5 March 1982	TG2276234238; 52°51′34″N 1°18′27″E	1172496	Upload Photo
Encircling Wall to St Mary's house	Happisburgh	Wall	1900	11 March 1985	TG3819930994; 52°49′26″N 1°32′03″E	1373394	Upload Photo
St Mary's (house) including 2 Summerhouses	Happisburgh	House	1900	11 March 1985	TG3817830990; 52°49′26″N 1°32′01″E	1306318	St Mary's (house) including 2 Summerhouses More images
Church of All Saints	Helhoughton	Parish Church	Decorated	6 March 1959	TF8690826523; 52°48′14″N 0°46′17″E	1305355	Church of All Saints More images
Church of All Saints	Hempstead	Parish Church	14th century	4 October 1960	TG1047037038; 52°53′22″N 1°07′38″E	1049211	Church of All Saints More images
Church of St Mary	Hickling	Parish Church	Late 14th century	16 April 1955	TG4149424258; 52°45′43″N 1°34′40″E	1373694	Church of St Mary More images
Windmill at Hickling Heath TG 40862301	Hickling	Windmill	1817	30 September 1987	TG4087423014; 52°45′04″N 1°34′04″E	1373693	Windmill at Hickling Heath TG 40862301 More images
Thornfield Residential Home for the Elderly	High Kelling	Country House	1903-4	27 September 1972	TG0984439836; 52°54′54″N 1°07′11″E	1049826	Thornfield Residential Home for the Elderly More images
Hope House	Hindolveston	House	1714	6 March 1984	TG0384829540; 52°49′29″N 1°01′27″E	1152886	Upload Photo
Hindringham Hall	Hindringham	Moat	1562	30 November 1951	TF9788636631; 52°53′27″N 0°56′24″E	1373727	Hindringham Hall More images
St Withburga's Church	Holkham Park, Holkham	Parish Church	13th century	6 March 1959	TF8780443631; 52°57′26″N 0°47′40″E	1171134	St Withburga's Church More images
Longlands Estate Workshops and Clock Tower	Holkham	Coal Shed	1850-1856	20 May 1983	TF8796840100; 52°55′31″N 0°47′41″E	1373638	Upload Photo
The Great Barn	Holkham	Workshop	c. 1790	20 May 1983	TF8900141399; 52°56′12″N 0°48′39″E	1049477	The Great Barn More images
The Obelisk	Holkham	Obelisk	1729-30	30 November 1951	TF8836441967; 52°56′31″N 0°48′06″E	1170847	The Obelisk More images
The Vinery	Howe Hill, Holkham	Vinery	1780	20 May 1983	TF8776242857; 52°57′01″N 0°47′36″E	1049485	The Vinery More images
Walls, Gates and Gatepiers to Kitchen Garden 100m North of Garden Cottage	Howe Hill	Gate	Late 18th century	20 May 1983	TF8758643023; 52°57′06″N 0°47′27″E	1049486	Walls, Gates and Gatepiers to Kitchen Garden 100m North of Garden Cottage
Parish Church of St Andrew	Holt	Parish Church	14th century	4 October 1960	TG0811938796; 52°54′23″N 1°05′36″E	1306557	Parish Church of St Andrew More images
The Old Rectory	Holt	Vicarage	18th century	20 February 1952	TG0724038750; 52°54′22″N 1°04′49″E	1049316	Upload Photo
Church of St Peter and St Paul	Honing	Parish Church	15th century	16 April 1955	TG3258828002; 52°47′58″N 1°26′56″E	1169952	Church of St Peter and St Paul More images
Honing Hall	Honing	House	1748	16 April 1955	TG3273429051; 52°48′31″N 1°27′06″E	1169963	Honing Hall More images
Church of St Benedict	Horning	Parish Church	13th century	16 April 1955	TG3549016553; 52°41′43″N 1°29′01″E	1305463	Church of St Benedict More images
Hobb's Mill at TG 34751628	Horning	Drainage Mill	Late 19th century	12 May 1987	TG3475216277; 52°41′36″N 1°28′21″E	1171625	Hobb's Mill at TG 34751628 More images
Remains of St Benet's Abbey	Horning	Abbey (delisted?)	1020-1545	16 April 1955	TG3833815645; 52°41′10″N 1°31′30″E	1049940	Remains of St Benet's Abbey More images
St Benets Level Windpump at TG 39941564	Horning	Drainage Mill	Late 18th century	12 May 1987	TG3994615633; 52°41′07″N 1°32′55″E	1171700	St Benets Level Windpump at TG 39941564 More images
Church of All Saints	Horsey	Parish Church	13th century	16 April 1955	TG4578023034; 52°44′56″N 1°38′25″E	1373715	Church of All Saints More images
Horsey Drainage Mill	Horsey	Drainage Mill	Mid 19th century	15 April 1955	TG4573322146; 52°44′28″N 1°38′20″E	1373716	Horsey Drainage Mill More images
Church of St John	Hoveton	Parish Church	12th century	16 April 1955	TG3092418174; 52°42′43″N 1°25′02″E	1373437	Church of St John More images
Church of St Peter	Hoveton	Parish Church	1624	16 April 1955	TG3142819549; 52°43′27″N 1°25′32″E	1171821	Church of St Peter More images
Greengates	Hoveton	House	c. 1700	16 April 1955	TG3208717498; 52°42′19″N 1°26′02″E	1049908	Upload Photo
Barn at Grange Farm	Ingham	Barn	15th century	30 August 1987	TG3845826036; 52°46′45″N 1°32′03″E	1373717	Upload Photo
Church of St Lawrence	Ingworth	Parish Church	Medieval	4 October 1960	TG1927429633; 52°49′11″N 1°15′10″E	1172575	Church of St Lawrence More images
Church of St Mary	Itteringham	Parish Church	Medieval	4 October 1960	TG1448830964; 52°50′01″N 1°10′58″E	1373807	Church of St Mary More images
Manor Farm House and Attached Garden Walls	Itteringham	House	1707	20 February 1952	TG1465730774; 52°49′54″N 1°11′06″E	1152734	Manor Farm House and Attached Garden Walls More images
Remains of Parish Church of Mannington	Mannington, Itteringham	Parish Church	11th century	4 October 1960	TG1417131879; 52°50′31″N 1°10′43″E	1049215	Remains of Parish Church of Mannington More images
Church of St Mary	Kelling	Parish Church	19th century	4 October 1960	TG0887741729; 52°55′56″N 1°06′23″E	1373476	Church of St Mary More images
Kelling Hall	Kelling	Country House	1913	30 September 1987	TG0908241742; 52°55′56″N 1°06′34″E	1151974	Kelling Hall More images
Church of All Saints	Kettlestone	Parish Church	Decorated	6 March 1959	TF9677331704; 52°50′49″N 0°55′14″E	1049261	Church of All Saints More images
Church of All Saints	Lessingham	Parish Church	13th century	16 April 1955	TG3920028505; 52°48′04″N 1°32′49″E	1172410	Church of All Saints More images
Church of St Andrew	Hempstead, Lessingham	Parish Church	13th century	16 April 1955	TG4033428407; 52°47′59″N 1°33′50″E	1373720	Church of St Andrew More images
Church of St Andrew	Letheringsett, Letheringsett with Glandford	Parish Church	11th century	4 October 1960	TG0604038926; 52°54′30″N 1°03′45″E	1049834	Church of St Andrew More images
Church of St Martin	Glandford, Letheringsett with Glandford	Parish Church	Medieval	4 October 1960	TG0439241413; 52°55′52″N 1°02′23″E	1304919	Church of St Martin More images
Hall Farmhouse	Letheringsett, Letheringsett with Glandford	Farmhouse	Early 17th century	20 February 1952	TG0617339085; 52°54′35″N 1°03′53″E	1049831	Upload Photo
Letheringsett Hall	Letheringsett, Letheringsett with Glandford	Country House	c. 1809	4 October 1960	TG0606538886; 52°54′28″N 1°03′46″E	1049832	Letheringsett Hall More images
The Mill	Letheringsett with Glandford	Watermill	1802	30 September 1987	TG0621438702; 52°54′22″N 1°03′54″E	1049838	The Mill More images
Church of St Andrew	Little Barningham	Parish Church	Medieval	4 October 1960	TG1417433322; 52°51′17″N 1°10′47″E	1373831	Church of St Andrew More images
Boardman's Windmill	Ludham	Drainage Mill	Late 19th century	12 May 1987	TG3694019250; 52°43′08″N 1°30′25″E	1373439	Boardman's Windmill More images
Ludham Hall including attached Chapel	Ludham	House	Late 18th century	16 April 1955	TG3808117566; 52°42′12″N 1°31′21″E	1171892	Ludham Hall including attached Chapel More images
Church of St Mary Barningham Winter	Barningham, Matlaske	Parish Church	Medieval	4 October 1960	TG1466535680; 52°52′33″N 1°11′18″E	1049180	Church of St Mary Barningham Winter More images
Church of St Peter	Matlaske	Parish Church	Saxon	4 October 1960	TG1509534869; 52°52′06″N 1°11′39″E	1049184	Church of St Peter More images
Church of St Peter	North Barningham, Matlaske	Parish Church	Medieval	4 October 1960	TG1506937150; 52°53′20″N 1°11′43″E	1373647	Church of St Peter More images
Coach House and Stables to Barningham Hall	Barningham, Matlaske	House	17th century	20 February 1987	TG1473135433; 52°52′25″N 1°11′21″E	1049179	Upload Photo
Melton Constable Hall North Wing and Stable Court South Wing	Melton Constable Park, Melton Constable	Country House	1810	25 September 1986	TG0311831935; 52°50′48″N 1°00′53″E	1373774	Melton Constable Hall North Wing and Stable Court South Wing
The Bath House	Melton Constable Park, Melton Constable	Bath House	1764	6 March 1984	TG0280531945; 52°50′48″N 1°00′37″E	1373811	Upload Photo
Greenhouse 150 Metres North West of Hoveton Hall	Neatishead	Bothy	c1809-12	7 October 1987	TG3154020119; 52°43′45″N 1°25′40″E	1049916	Upload Photo
R30 Operations Room	Neatishead, North Norfolk	Operations Block	1942	22 February 2008	TG3454418501; 52°42′48″N 1°28′15″E	1393421	Upload Photo
Friends Meeting House	North Walsham, North Norfolk	Friends Meeting House	1772	21 June 1950	TG2851631732; 52°50′05″N 1°23′28″E	1373956	Friends Meeting House More images
Ivy Cottage	North Walsham, North Norfolk	House	Early 18th century	29 September 1972	TG2810630242; 52°49′17″N 1°23′02″E	1039530	Upload Photo
14 Aylsham Road	North Walsham, North Norfolk	House	Early 18th century	21 June 1950	TG2806230255; 52°49′18″N 1°23′00″E	1039533	Upload Photo
Church of St Martin	Overstrand	Parish Church	Medieval	4 October 1960	TG2407640764; 52°55′03″N 1°19′54″E	1049816	Church of St Martin More images
The Pleasaunce	Overstrand	House	Pre 1897	27 September 1972	TG2475540902; 52°55′07″N 1°20′30″E	1049817	The Pleasaunce More images
Clock Tower, Loggias, Towers, and Associated Buildings at the Pleasaunce	Overstrand	Loggia	1897-1899	15 February 1988	TG2479240912; 52°55′07″N 1°20′32″E	1170821	Clock Tower, Loggias, Towers, and Associated Buildings at the Pleasaunce More images
Covered Walk at the Pleasaunce	Overstrand	Covered Way	1897-1899	27 September 1972	TG2471240882; 52°55′06″N 1°20′28″E	1049818	Upload Photo
Gateway at the Pleasaunce	Overstrand	Gate	c. 1900	15 February 1988	TG2476540802; 52°55′03″N 1°20′30″E	1049819	Upload Photo
Gazebo at the Pleasaunce	Overstrand	Gazebo	Late 19th century	27 September 1972	TG2465740986; 52°55′09″N 1°20′25″E	1305854	Gazebo at the Pleasaunce More images
Paston Great Barn	Paston	Engine House	1581	16 April 1955	TG3219034538; 52°51′30″N 1°26′51″E	1306240	Paston Great Barn More images
Church of St Michael	Plumstead	Parish Church	Pre 19th century	4 October 1960	TG1325434893; 52°52′09″N 1°10′01″E	1152882	Church of St Michael More images
Heigham Holmes Windpump	Potter Heigham	Drainage Mill	Mid 19th century	12 May 1987	TG4496320239; 52°43′27″N 1°37′34″E	1172656	Heigham Holmes Windpump More images
Potter Heigham Bridge	Potter Heigham	Bridge	14th century	20 February 1952	TG4199918473; 52°42′35″N 1°34′52″E	1152457	Potter Heigham Bridge More images
Church of St Martin	South Raynham, Raynham	Parish Church	14th century	6 March 1959	TF8808324328; 52°47′02″N 0°47′15″E	1049275	Church of St Martin More images
Church of St Mary	East Raynham, Raynham	Church	1866-1868	6 March 1959	TF8797025540; 52°47′41″N 0°47′11″E	1172454	Church of St Mary More images
Church of St Mary	Roughton	Parish Church	Medieval	4 October 1960	TG2202436524; 52°52′49″N 1°17′53″E	1049531	Church of St Mary More images
Church of the Holy Trinity	West Runton, Runton	Parish Church	Medieval	4 October 1960	TG1797242829; 52°56′19″N 1°14′32″E	1049535	Church of the Holy Trinity More images
Church of St Andrew	Ryburgh	Parish Church	Norman	6 March 1959	TF9620627269; 52°48′26″N 0°54′34″E	1305377	Church of St Andrew More images
Church of St Mary and All Saints	Sculthorpe	Parish Church	14th century	6 March 1959	TF8995931911; 52°51′04″N 0°49′11″E	1049380	Church of St Mary and All Saints More images
Cranmer Hall	Cranmer Park, Sculthorpe, North Norfolk	House	c. 1719	30 November 1951	TF8868332728; 52°51′32″N 0°48′04″E	1049376	Upload Photo
Stables, Carriage Entrance Gates, Wall and Door to Arch	Cranmer Hall, Sculthorpe, North Norfolk	Gate	1866	16 January 1984	TF8861132720; 52°51′32″N 0°48′00″E	1171447	Upload Photo
Church of St John	Waxham, North Norfolk	Parish Church	12th century	16 April 1955	TG4405726227; 52°46′42″N 1°37′02″E	1049359	Church of St John More images
Church of St Margaret	Sea Palling, North Norfolk	Parish Church	13th century	16 April 1955	TG4298926820; 52°47′03″N 1°36′07″E	1049358	Church of St Margaret More images
Church of All Saints	Skeyton, North Norfolk	Parish Church	13th century	16 April 1955	TG2461825703; 52°46′56″N 1°19′45″E	1373825	Church of All Saints More images
Church of St Bartholomew	Sloley	Parish Church	Late C13/Early 14th century	16 April 1955	TG2988624123; 52°45′57″N 1°24′22″E	1373826	Church of St Bartholomew More images
Church of St Peter	Smallburgh	Parish Church	14th century	16 April 1955	TG3337323960; 52°45′46″N 1°27′27″E	1049883	Church of St Peter More images
Beechlands Farmhouse	Southrepps	House	1744	20 February 1952	TG2563936754; 52°52′51″N 1°21′07″E	1305745	Beechlands Farmhouse More images
Southrepps Hall	Southrepps	House	Early 18th century	20 February 1952	TG2418737064; 52°53′03″N 1°19′50″E	1171164	Southrepps Hall More images
Church of St Mary the Virgin	Stalham	Parish Church	14th century	16 April 1955	TG3730825165; 52°46′19″N 1°31′00″E	1172564	Church of St Mary the Virgin More images
Stalham Hall	Stalham	House	c. 1670	16 April 1955	TG3794324938; 52°46′10″N 1°31′33″E	1305053	Upload Photo
Church of All Saints	Stibbard	Parish Church	c. 1100	6 March 1959	TF9830628428; 52°49′01″N 0°56′29″E	1049230	Church of All Saints More images
Sennowe Hall Clock Tower	Sennowe Park, Stibbard	Clock Tower	1905-1907	6 March 1984	TF9805325636; 52°47′31″N 0°56′09″E	1049228	Upload Photo
Sennowe Hall, and Stable Court	Sennowe Park, Stibbard	House	Early 19th century	6 March 1984	TF9813025618; 52°47′30″N 0°56′13″E	1153104	Sennowe Hall, and Stable Court More images
Entrance Lodge to Stiffkey Old Hall	Stiffkey	Entrance Lodge	1604	20 May 1983	TF9743542931; 52°56′51″N 0°56′14″E	1049466	Upload Photo
Old Rectory	Stiffkey	House	C20	30 November 1951	TF9738943090; 52°56′56″N 0°56′12″E	1049464	Upload Photo
Stiffkey Old Hall	Stiffkey	House	1576 onwards	30 November 1951	TF9742642963; 52°56′52″N 0°56′13″E	1373654	Stiffkey Old Hall More images
1 Church Street	Stiffkey	House	Late 16th century	19 December 1979	TF9714143080; 52°56′56″N 0°55′58″E	1171483	Upload Photo
Church of St Lawrence	Hunworth, Stody	Parish Church	Medieval	20 February 1987	TG0648835492; 52°52′38″N 1°04′01″E	1049189	Church of St Lawrence More images
Hunworth Mill and attached Millhouse	Stody	Mill House	Early 18th century	27 September 1972	TG0664335606; 52°52′42″N 1°04′10″E	1049191	Upload Photo
Church of St Andrew	Metton, Sustead	Parish Church	Medieval	4 October 1960	TG1990337287; 52°53′17″N 1°16′02″E	1049496	Church of St Andrew More images
Church of St Mary	Bessingham, Sustead	Parish Church	Medieval	4 October 1960	TG1668137055; 52°53′14″N 1°13′09″E	1305371	Church of St Mary More images
Church of St Peter and St Paul	Sustead	Parish Church	Medieval	4 October 1960	TG1828037018; 52°53′11″N 1°14′35″E	1305393	Church of St Peter and St Paul More images
Outbuilding and adjoining Walls to North, South and East at Hall Farm	Sustead	Dwelling	Early 17th century	20 February 1952	TG1916636861; 52°53′04″N 1°15′22″E	1305348	Upload Photo
Church of St Michael	Sutton	Parish Church	Early 14th century	16 April 1955	TG3884223948; 52°45′37″N 1°32′18″E	1172607	Church of St Michael More images
Sutton Mill	Sutton	Corn Mill	1789	16 April 1955	TG3957723871; 52°45′33″N 1°32′57″E	1049326	Sutton Mill More images
Church of St Giles	Bradfield, Swafield	Parish Church	14th century	16 April 1955	TG2679733302; 52°50′58″N 1°22′00″E	1306217	Church of St Giles More images
Church of St Nicholas	Swafield	Parish Church	Early 14th century	16 April 1955	TG2862133072; 52°50′48″N 1°23′37″E	1306194	Church of St Nicholas More images
Church of St. Michael	Swanton Abbott	Parish Church	Medieval	16 April 1955	TG2658926253; 52°47′11″N 1°21′32″E	1049172	Church of St. Michael More images
Church of St Edmund	Swanton Novers	Parish Church	Norman	6 March 1959	TG0154832380; 52°51′04″N 0°59′30″E	1304415	Church of St Edmund More images
Church of All Saints	Thornage	Parish Church	11th century	4 October 1960	TG0498736210; 52°53′03″N 1°02′43″E	1373820	Church of All Saints More images
Thornage Hall	Thornage		c. 1482	20 February 1952	TG0479136364; 52°53′09″N 1°02′33″E	1304519	Thornage Hall More images
Dovecote, circa 30 Metres South East of Thornage Hall	Thornage	Dovecote	1728	4 October 1960	TG0484236342; 52°53′08″N 1°02′35″E	1049195	Dovecote, circa 30 Metres South East of Thornage Hall More images
Thornage Water Mill	Thornage	Watermill	Late 18th century	13 November 1978	TG0611436754; 52°53′19″N 1°03′44″E	1153034	Upload Photo
Church of St Margaret	Thorpe Market	Parish Church	1796	4 October 1960	TG2449635381; 52°52′09″N 1°20′03″E	1049786	Church of St Margaret More images
Gunton Tower	Thorpe Market	Lookout	c. 1830	4 October 1960	TG2389234880; 52°51′53″N 1°19′29″E	1049785	Gunton Tower More images
Church of St Andrew	Thurning	Parish Church	14th century	6 March 1959	TG0803829446; 52°49′21″N 1°05′10″E	1153202	Church of St Andrew More images
Church of St Andrew	Thursford	Parish Church	c. 1200	6 March 1959	TF9839433797; 52°51′54″N 0°56′45″E	1049238	Church of St Andrew More images
Church of St John the Baptist	Trimingham	Parish Church	Medieval	4 October 1960	TG2793738756; 52°53′52″N 1°23′15″E	1049787	Church of St John the Baptist More images
Hall Farmhouse	Trunch	Farmhouse	Late 16th century	16 April 1955	TG2920534859; 52°51′45″N 1°24′13″E	1306152	Upload Photo
Sheringham Hall	Upper Sheringham	Country House	1812-19	30 September 1987	TG1336942328; 52°56′09″N 1°10′25″E	1049799	Sheringham Hall More images
Berry Hall	Walsingham	House	16th century	30 November 1951	TF9409737659; 52°54′05″N 0°53′04″E	1374003	Berry Hall
Black Lion Hotel	Walsingham	Hotel	15th century	30 November 1951	TF9334936734; 52°53′36″N 0°52′22″E	1049549	Black Lion Hotel More images
Bull Inn	Walsingham	Timber Framed House	16th century	30 November 1951	TF9347436856; 52°53′40″N 0°52′29″E	1039387	Bull Inn More images
Church House	Walsingham	House	Early 18th century	30 November 1951	TF9346036492; 52°53′28″N 0°52′27″E	1171656	Church House More images
Dow House	Walsingham	Timber Framed House	Early 16th century	30 November 1951	TF9337336686; 52°53′34″N 0°52′23″E	1039355	Dow House
Elmham House	Walsingham	House	18th century	30 November 1951	TF9334036694; 52°53′35″N 0°52′21″E	1373616	Elmham House More images
Kitchen and Refectory at the College of Clergy	Walsingham	Kitchen	16th century	30 November 1951	TF9356236938; 52°53′42″N 0°52′34″E	1373613	Upload Photo
Maytyr House	Walsingham	Timber Framed House	16th century	30 November 1951	TF9340036814; 52°53′38″N 0°52′25″E	1374015	Upload Photo
Methodist Chapel	Walsingham	Methodist Chapel	1794	14 March 1977	TF9334136642; 52°53′33″N 0°52′21″E	1373993	Methodist Chapel More images
Oxford Stores Public House	Walsingham	Timber Framed House	16th century	30 November 1951	TF9337836722; 52°53′35″N 0°52′24″E	1039358	Oxford Stores Public House
Ruins of Church of St Edmund	Walsingham	Church	12th century	15 February 1979	TF8968037388; 52°54′02″N 0°49′07″E	1039409	Ruins of Church of St Edmund More images
Shire Hall	Walsingham	Court Room	Late 18th century	30 November 1951	TF9344936835; 52°53′39″N 0°52′28″E	1039388	Shire Hall
St Augustine's at the College of Clergy	Walsingham	Theological College	16th century	30 November 1951	TF9357636910; 52°53′41″N 0°52′34″E	1373612	Upload Photo
The Manor House	Walsingham	Manor House	16th century	30 November 1951	TF9397837674; 52°54′05″N 0°52′58″E	1374023	The Manor House More images
9 and 10 Common Place	Walsingham	House	16th century	30 November 1951	TF9346636840; 52°53′39″N 0°52′28″E	1171703	Upload Photo
19 High Street	Walsingham	Timber Framed House	16th century	6 March 1959	TF9337836695; 52°53′34″N 0°52′23″E	1039356	Upload Photo
21 High Street	Walsingham	Timber Framed House	Late 16th century	6 March 1959	TF9338136709; 52°53′35″N 0°52′24″E	1039357	Upload Photo
33 High Street	Walsingham	House/Tea Room	16th century	30 November 1951	TF9338836807; 52°53′38″N 0°52′24″E	1374014	33 High Street
48 High Street	Walsingham	Timber Framed House	Late 15th century	30 November 1951	TF9341936817; 52°53′38″N 0°52′26″E	1305347	48 High Street
50 High Street	Walsingham	House	Earlier Core	30 November 1951	TF9341936827; 52°53′39″N 0°52′26″E	1374021	50 High Street
52 High Street	Walsingham	House	Earlier Core	30 November 1951	TF9342136834; 52°53′39″N 0°52′26″E	1171980	52 High Street
54 High Street (Shop by the Pump)	Walsingham	Timber Framed House/shop	16th century	30 November 1951	TF9342436840; 52°53′39″N 0°52′26″E	1374029	54 High Street (Shop by the Pump)
Church of All Saints	Warham	Parish Church	13th century	6 March 1959	TF9478241620; 52°56′12″N 0°53′49″E	1049439	Church of All Saints More images
Church of St Nicholas	Wells-next-the-Sea	Parish Church	Established early 13th century	19 January 1951	TF9183443157; 52°57′05″N 0°51′15″E	1230479	Church of St Nicholas More images
Marsh House	Wells-next-the-Sea	House	1742	19 January 1951	TF9181943328; 52°57′11″N 0°51′14″E	1231197	Upload Photo
Ostrich House	Wells-next-the-Sea	House		19 January 1951	TF9170743194; 52°57′07″N 0°51′08″E	1230203	Upload Photo
St Michael's Cottage	Wells-next-the-Sea	House	16th century	13 June 1972	TF9163543756; 52°57′25″N 0°51′05″E	1231195	Upload Photo
Old Hall Farm House	Westwick	Manor House	16th century	16 April 1955	TG2880024882; 52°46′23″N 1°23′26″E	1152425	Upload Photo
Church of All Saints	Weybourne	Parish Church	11th century	4 October 1960	TG1117043032; 52°56′35″N 1°08′29″E	1152481	Church of All Saints More images
Church of St Margaret	Wolterton, Wickmere	Ruined Church	Medieval	4 October 1960	TG1634732052; 52°50′33″N 1°12′40″E	1304991	Church of St Margaret More images
The Stables, Wolterton Hall	Wolterton, Wickmere	Stable	c. 1750	24 April 1987	TG1639431784; 52°50′24″N 1°12′41″E	1152001	Upload Photo
Wiveton Hall	Wiveton	House	1653	30 November 1951	TG0390444099; 52°57′20″N 1°02′03″E	1373519	Wiveton Hall More images
Church of All Saints	Wood Norton	Parish Church	15th century	6 March 1959	TG0105827777; 52°48′36″N 0°58′54″E	1373800	Church of All Saints More images
Undercroft at St Andrews Cottage	Worstead	House	Medieval	29 April 1987	TG3025626039; 52°46′58″N 1°24′46″E	1049141	Upload Photo
