= Boardman's Windmill =

Windmill in Norfolk, England

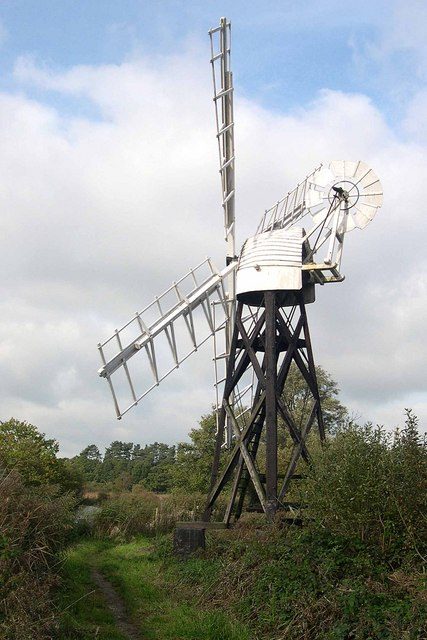
- Boardman's Mill, October 2006
- Interactive map of Boardman's Windmill

Origin
- Mill name: Boardman's Mill
- Mill location: Ludham, Norfolk, United Kingdom
- Grid reference: TG 3694 1925
- Coordinates: 52°43′08″N 1°30′25″E
- Operator: Norfolk Windmills Trust
- Year built: C.1880

Information
- Purpose: Drainage mill
- Type: Trestle mill
- No. of sails: Four
- Type of sails: Patent sails
- Windshaft: Cast iron
- Winding: Fantail
- Fantail blades: Eight
- Type of pump: Originally a scoopwheel, now an Appold turbine

Boardman's Windmill is a Grade II* listed trestle mill at How Hill, Ludham, Norfolk, United Kingdom. Built in the 1880s, it worked until 1938. The mill has been restored.

== History ==
Boardman's mill was built c.1880 by millwright Daniel England of Ludham. In 1926, the scoopwheel was replaced by an Appold turbine. The mill was damaged by a gale in 1938 and ceased to work Arthur C. Smith surveyed the mill on 17 May 1977. He described the mill as in fair condition. The mill was missing its sails and fantail. He surveyed the mill again on 23 May 1984. The mill had then been restored, and was in the ownership of the Norfolk Windmills Trust. The mill was listed Grade II* on 12 May 1987. As of March 2026, the mill is missing its sails, although it has its stocks.

== Description ==
Boardman's mill is an open trestle mill. It has a small boat shape cap with petticoat. Four double Patent sails are carried on a cast iron windshaft. The mill is winded by a fantail. Originally driving a scoopwheel, the mill now drives an Appold turbine.

== Location ==
The mill stands on the east bank of the River Ant close to the large Edwardian building houses the Norfolk Broads Study Centre at How Hill, Ludham. Just to the north of this windmill on the same side of the River Ant is another small interesting drainage windmill called Clayrack Drainage Mill.

== See also ==
Other trestle mills on the Norfolk Broads:- St Olaves Windpump, Fritton Hobb's Mill, Horning
