= Honing Hall =

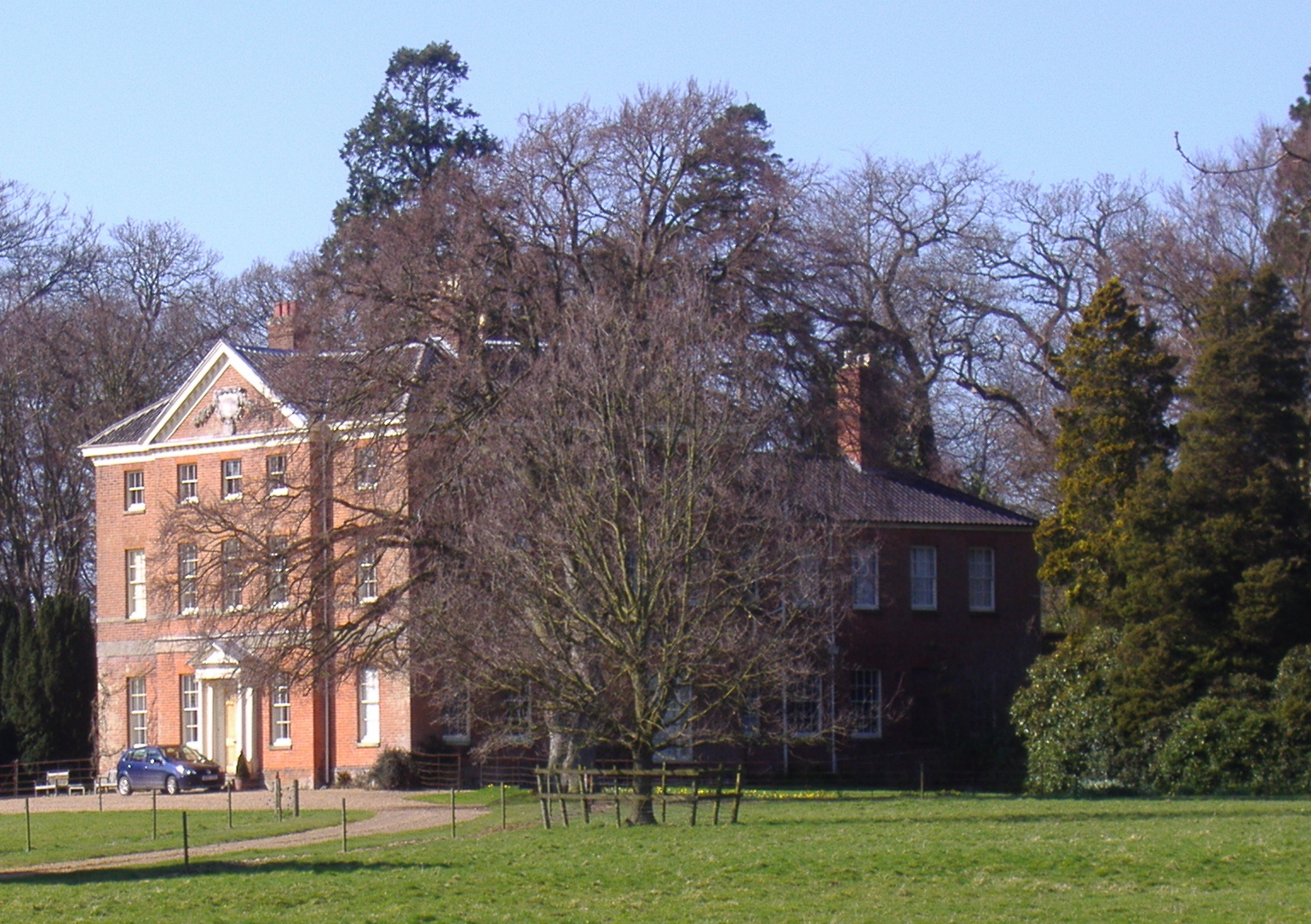
- Viewed from the south east

- Location within Norfolk

General information
- Type: Historic house
- Location: Honing, Honing Hall, Honing, Norfolk, NR28 9NN, North Walsham, England
- Coordinates: 52.808725°N 1.451744°E
- Completed: 1748
- Renovated: 1788 (John Soane); 1792 (Humphry Repton, Landscaped)
- Client: Andrew Chamber

Website

Listed Building – Grade II
- Designated: 16 April 1955
- Reference no.: 1169963

Honing Hall is a Grade II* listed building which stands in a small estate close to the village of Honing in the English county of Norfolk within the United Kingdom. It was built in 1748 for a wealthy worsted weaver called Andrew Chamber.

== Description ==
The hall is rectangle in plan and is built over three storeys and is situated in the centre of the north end of the small estate. The south-facing façade has five bays with a pediment over the three central bays. Carved in stone set into the brick-faced pediment is a coat of arms with garlands. The front main entrance has Ionic columns topped with a pediment protruding from the front triple-bay building line, the roof is clad in black glazed Norfolk pantiles.

The west-facing façade has a latter addition of a full-height bowed extension with windows which overlook the gardens on this side of the hall. This extension is attributed to the architect John Soane and was part of the alterations carried out under his instruction in 1788 and completed in 1790. Around the building at the first floor Humphry Repton added a platband embellishment in his alterations of 1792.

In 1868 a new service wing was added to the north elevation under the instruction of architect Richard Phipson. He also moved the original 1748 staircase into the new wing.

=== Other estate buildings ===
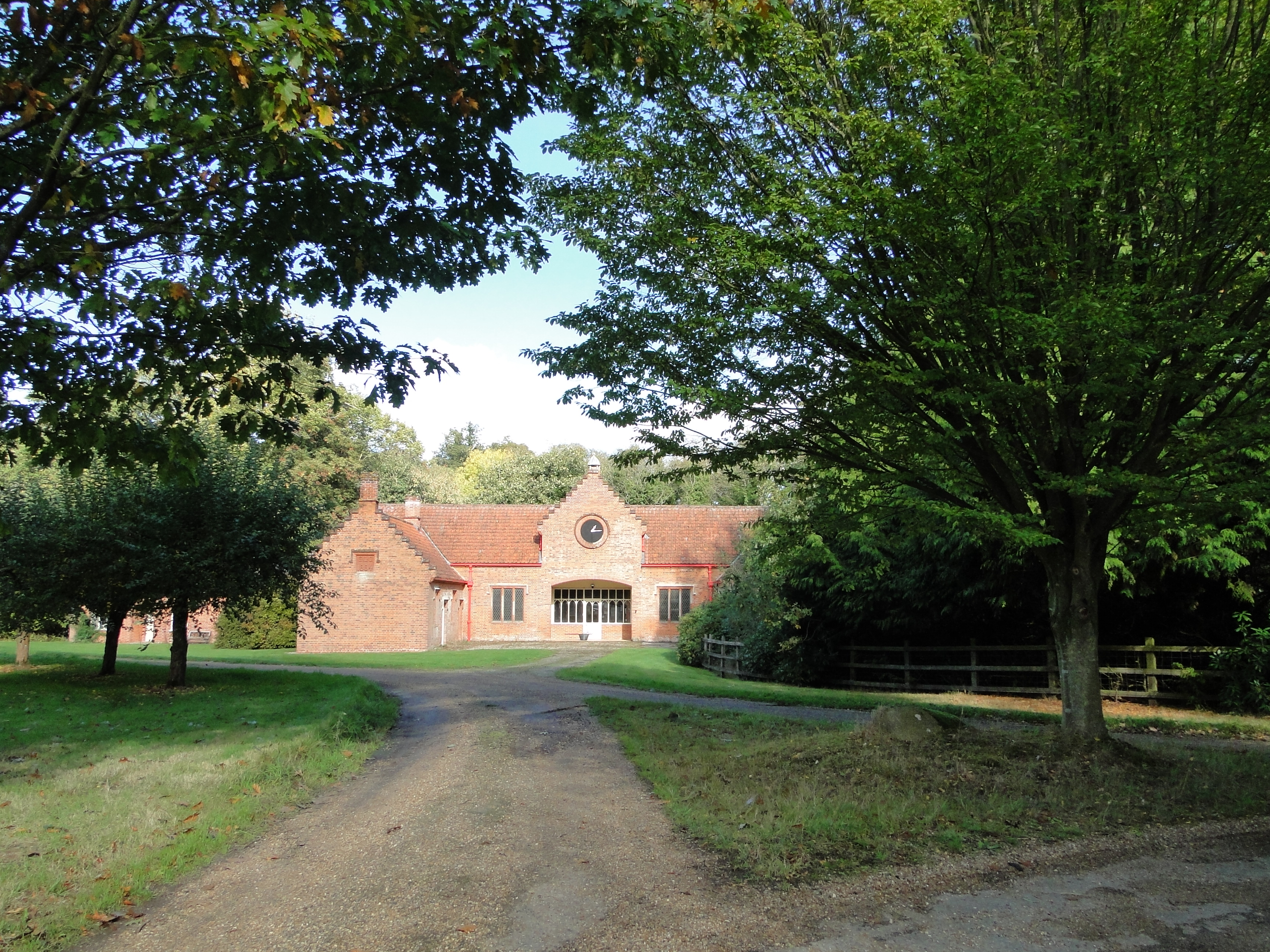
Stable block at Honing Hall

130 metres to the north of the hall is the coach house and stable block which is also Grade II listed. The stable is a single-storey Norfolk red brick built building with a pantile roof and has a U-shaped plan. In the centre of the building there is a crow-stepped gable above which there is a clock tower topped with a cupola. Below this is an archway.

=== Walled garden ===
150 metres south west of the house there is a three-sided walled garden with the south elevation open. Each of the three walls have a gothic-arched entrance through. The originally there were lean-to greenhouses along the north wall but these have been demolished. It is believed that it was Repton who had the south wall removed as part of his instruction to shorten the depth of the enclosed garden to open up the view of his landscape scheme when viewed from the hall.

=== Park and gardens ===
The landscaped gardens around Honing Hall were designed by Humphry Repton in 1792. He produced one of his striking red book of designs showing his ideas before and after. Much of the design work from the book was taken up. The grounds take up 35 hectares most of which is to the south of the hall. Much of the boundary is planted with small plantations of trees with open space in the middle which has scattered clumps of oak trees.

== History ==
The present hall stands on land which was once occupied by a much earlier settlement or house which stood a short distance from where the stable block is. The remnants of this house were thought to have been finally removed just before the construction of the hall in 1748. This previous dwelling itself had replaced an earlier enclosed medieval moated dwelling which stood just inside the northern boundary of the property. This area is now an overgrown plantation but vestiges of three arms of the moat can be found and still retain water. In the centre is a raised area where once stood the medieval building.

In the 1740s the property was purchased by Andrew Chamber who was a prosperous Norwich worsted weaver. He engaged an unknown architect to build a new country house for his family, and it was completed in 1748. It appears that at some time Chamber got into financial difficulties and as a consequence sold the house and property to Thomas Cubitt in 1784.

Cubitt was a captain in the East Norfolk Militia. His son, also called Thomas, inherited the hall and moved into it after his marriage in 1784. It was Thomas Henry Cubitt who instructed the prominent architect John Soane to prepare plans for alterations to the Hall. Some of Soane's recommendations were taken up by Cubitt, in particular the full-height semicircular bowed extension on the west façade.

In 1792 the landscape designer and architect Humphry Repton was commissioned by Thomas to redesign the grounds. He was also responsible for work on the house, including alterations to the exterior. In the Gazetteer and Directory of Norfolk (1836) the owner of the house and lord of the manor was Edward Cubitt. The house and estate are still owned by the Cubitt family.

=== The Cubitt family ===
The Cubitts of Honing have a distinguished history of serving their country in the military. As already mentioned, the first owner, Thomas Cubitt was a captain in the East Norfolk Militia; he was also a justice of the peace and a deputy lieutenant of the county of Norfolk. Edward George Cubitt (1795 – 1865) served with the 4th Dragoons in the Peninsular War where he was at the Burgos and was decorated for actions at Battle of Vitoria, Pamplona and Battle of Toulouse (1814). There is a tablet dedicated to Edward's memory in the parish church of Saint Peter and Saint Paul in the village of Honing.

==== First World War ====
The family's military service continued in the First World War. Three sons of Edward G. Cubitt and his wife Christabel of Honing Hall: Captain Edward Randall Cubitt, Lieutenant Victor Murray Cubitt and Captain Eustace Henry Cubitt and the Cubitts' cousin, Second Lieutenant Randall Burroughes, served with the Territorial 5th Battalion of the Norfolk Regiment. On 12 August 1915, during the Gallipoli campaign, the battalion went into action on the battlefield of Suvla. Colonel Beauchamp, 17 of his officers, which included the Cubitt brothers and their cousin and 250 men advanced toward the enemy and suffered heavy losses when it became isolated. A myth grew up long after the War that the men had advanced into a mist and simply disappeared. Captain Edward Randall Cubitt, Lieutenant Victor Murray Cubitt and Second Lieutenant Randall Burroughes were all killed in action. Victor and Edward have no known grave and are commemorated on the Helles Memorial near Sedd el Bahr, Turkey, and on the parish church war memorial in Honing. Captain Eustace Henry Cubitt survived the attack of the 12 August but was killed in action on 19 April 1917 and his grave is in Gaza War Cemetery. A BBC TV drama, All the King's Men (1999), starring David Jason as Captain Frank Beck, was based on the 5th Norfolks' story.
