= Clayrack Drainage Mill =

Windmill in Norfolk, England

Clayrack Drainage Windmill
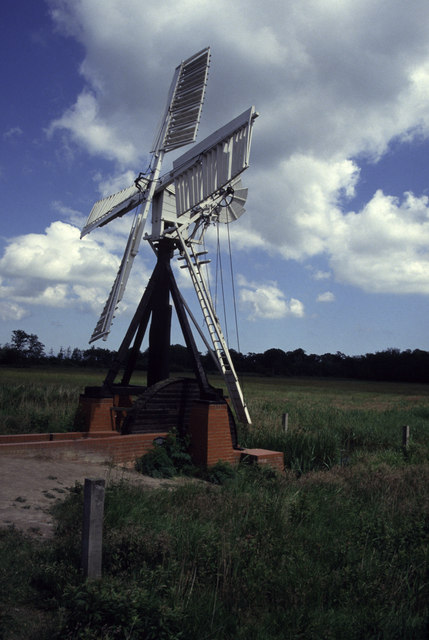
- Clayrack Drainage Windmill
- Interactive map of Clayrack Drainage Windmill

Origin
- Mill location: Ludham, Norfolk, United Kingdom
- Grid reference: TG 3692 1944
- Coordinates: 52°43′10″N 1°30′23″E
- Operator: Norfolk Windmills Trust
- Year built: 1987

Information
- Purpose: Drainage mill
- Type: Hollow post mill
- No. of sails: Four
- Type of sails: Patent sails
- Windshaft: Cast iron
- Winding: Fantail
- Fantail blades: Eight
- Type of pump: Scoopwheel

Clayrack Drainage Windmill is a hollow post mill at Ludham, Norfolk, United Kingdom. It was originally at Ranworth, and was dismantled in 1981. Re-erected in 1987-88, it has been restored.

== History ==
Clayrack Mill originally stood on Ranworth Broad (TG 367 148). It worked until 1903. The derelict mill was rescued in 1981 by the Norfolk Windmills Trust. It was rebuilt at How Hill, Ludham in 1987-88 by Richard Seago, millwright of South Walsham with assistance from Anglian Water. The project was financed by the Broads Authority.

== Description ==
Clayrack Mill is a hollow post mill. It is about 15 feet (4.6 m) tall. Four single Patent sails are carried on a cast iron windshaft. The mill is winded by a fantail.

== Location ==
The mill stands on the east bank of the River Ant close to the large Edwardian building houses the Norfolk Broads Study Centre at How Hill, Ludham. Just to the south of this windmill on the same side of the River Ant is another small interesting drainage windmill called Boardman's Windmill.
