= Horsey Windpump =

Drainage windmill in Horsey, Norfolk, England

- Horsey Windpump, October 2023
- Interactive map of Horsey Windpump

Origin
- Mill location: Horsey, Norfolk
- Grid reference: TG 4573 2215
- Coordinates: 52°44′28″N 1°38′20.50″E
- Operator: National Trust
- Year built: 1912

Information
- Purpose: Drainage mill
- Type: Tower mill/
- Storeys: Four storeys
- No. of sails: Four
- Type of sails: Patent sails
- Windshaft: Cast iron
- Winding: Fantail
- Fantail blades: Eight
- Auxiliary power: Steam engine, later diesel engine, then electric motor
- Type of pump: Appold turbine

Horsey Windpump is a windpump or drainage windmill in the care of the National Trust in the village of Horsey, on The Broads near Great Yarmouth, Norfolk, England. The structure is a grade II* listed building. It has been restored to working order and is open to the public.

== History ==
The first mill on the site was the Black Mill. It was a tower mill built in the early 18th century. The mill was tailwinded in March 1895; the cap was blown off. The cap was replaced in 1897. By 1912, the mill was in a dangerous condition and it was decided to dismantle and rebuilt it.

The mill was rebuilt by Daniel England, the Ludham millwright. The intention was to keep the rebuilt cap, as it was in good condition, but an accident when it was being lifted saw it topple to the ground and smash to pieces. The brake wheel had not been spragged, allowing the sails to turn when the cap was lifted. The tower was dismantled, and a new tower was constructed. The bricks being made at Martham. A new upright shaft of Scandinavian pine was fitted, but all other machinery from the Black Mill was reused. In 1900, a steam engine was installed as auxiliary power. It was replaced by a diesel engine in 1939. The mill worked by wind until July 1943, when it was struck by lightning damaging the sails. The mill worked by the diesel engine until 1957, when the pump was converted to electric power.

The National Trust acquired the Horsey Estate, including the mill, in 1948. The mill had lost its fantail by c. 1951. It retained its sails c.1955, but they had been removed by May 1958. The mill was listed Grade II on 15 April 1955. In 1957, the Society for the Protection of Ancient Buildings (SPAB) launched an appeal for funds to restore the mill. In 1962, a second appeal by Norfolk County Council raised the £2,750 needed to restore the mill. Restoration was carried out by Smithdale's, the Acle millwrights, under the Norfolk Windmills Trust and SPAB. The mill was upgraded to a Grade II* listed building on 30 September 1987.

The Great Storm of 1987 caused further damage, and repair works were required before the building could reopen to visitors in 1990. The mill lost its fantail, which had not been replaced by June 1989. Having succumbed to the ravages of time and the elements, the sails were removed again in 2014. A restoration project started in 2016 to repair and reinstate the cap and sails, with the ambition of restoring the mill to full working order. A new cap was fitted in 2017. The new sails were fitted in February 2018, marking the end of Phase 1 of the restoration. Finally, after a four-month wait of unsuccessful tests in unfavourable wind, the sails eventually turned on the evening of 29 May 2019 for the first time since 1943. This restoration work was awarded 'Building Conservation Project of the Year 2019' at The Royal Institution of Chartered Surveyors (RICS) regional awards. But whilst the sails have now turned successfully, this was only the first step in testing the sails with more shutters needing to be added and putting them through their paces in different wind conditions. The hope is that the sails will be turning regularly for visitors later on in the year.

== Description ==
The crown wheel and layshaft in Horsey mill. Note that the bottom of the tower is original material from the Black Mill.

Horsey Windpump is a four storey tower mill. It has a boat shape cap with petticoat and gallery. Four double Patent sails are carried on a cast iron windshaft. The mill is winded by an eight-bladed fantail. The windshaft carries a cast iron brake wheel with wooden cogs. This drives a cast iron wallower, at the top of the wooden upright shaft. A cast iron crown wheel at the bottom of the upright shaft drives an Appold turbine via a layshaft.
