= St Mary's Church, East Ruston =

Coordinates: 52.8037°N 1.5061°E

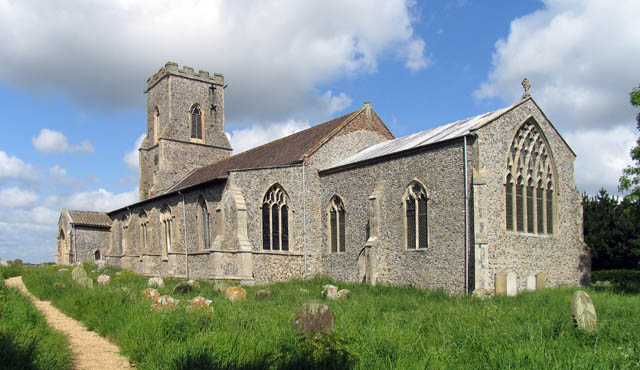
- St Mary's Church, East Ruston, from the southeast

- Location in Norfolk
- OS grid reference: TG 364 287
- Location: East Ruston, Norfolk
- Country: England
- Denomination: Anglican
- Website: Churches Conservation Trust

Architecture
- Functional status: Redundant
- Heritage designation: Grade II*
- Designated: 16 April 1955
- Architectural type: Church
- Style: Gothic

Specifications
- Materials: Flint and brick

St Mary's Church is a redundant Anglican church in the village of East Ruston, Norfolk, England. It is recorded in the National Heritage List for England as a designated Grade II* listed building, and is under the care of the Churches Conservation Trust. The church stands in an isolated position on the east side of the B1159 road, some 2 miles (3 km) north of Stalham. It is noted for its 15th-century painted and carved chancel screen.

== History ==
The church dates from the 14th century. It was remodelled during the following century, and the north aisle was removed in 1778. The chancel was restored in 1887, and the tower was restored in 1985–86. Although the church is now redundant, an annual carol service is held each December.

== Architecture ==
=== Exterior ===
St Mary's is constructed mainly in flint with ashlar dressings, although the north wall is in brick. The roof of the nave is tiled, while the aisle and chancel have lead roofs. Its plan consists of a five-bay nave, a south aisle with a chapel at the east end, a south porch, a two-bay chancel, and a west tower. The tower is in three stages, with angle buttresses and a battlemented parapet. In the lowest stage are two windows, one above the other, the upper window being blocked. In the middle stage are lancet windows, the window on the north side being blocked. Above the window on the south side is a circular clock face. The bell openings in the top stage have two lights. The window in the west wall of the aisle dates from about 1340 and has two lights, but is blocked. The south porch is gabled and has a niche for a statue above the entrance arch. Along the south wall of the aisle are three three-light Perpendicular windows dating from the 15th century, and one two-light window with Y-tracery from the 18th century. The east window in the aisle has a three-light 15th-century window. In the south wall of the chancel are two two-light windows, and the east window has five lights. The north wall of the chancel contains one blocked window. In the north wall of the nave are three Perpendicular windows moved from the former north aisle.

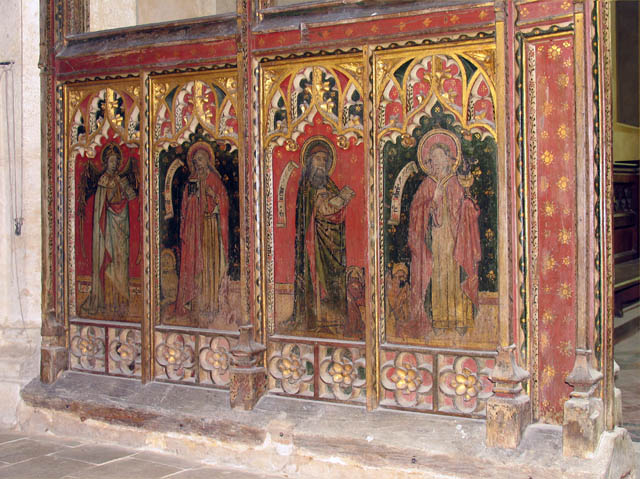
Part of chancel screen

=== Interior ===
The five-bay south arcade is carried on octagonal piers. In the south chapel is a pedestal on two steps, and a piscina. There is another piscina in the south wall of the chancel. The chancel screen has five bays with an arched opening. On the west side, each lateral bay contains two panels with paintings of figures, the Four Evangelists on one side, and four doctors of the early church, Saint Ambrose, Saint Augustine, Saint Jerome, and Saint Gregory on the other. On the east side of the screen are carvings of lions. Above the panels is arched tracery. The font dates from the 15th century and was restored in 1884. It stands on three octagonal steps and consists of an octagonal bowl on a stem. At the base of the stem are carvings of grotesque beasts. The bowl is supported by angels and its panels are carved with symbols of the Evangelists.

== See also ==
- List of churches preserved by the Churches Conservation Trust in the East of England
