= St Withburga's Church, Holkham =

Coordinates: 52.9572°N 0.7945°E

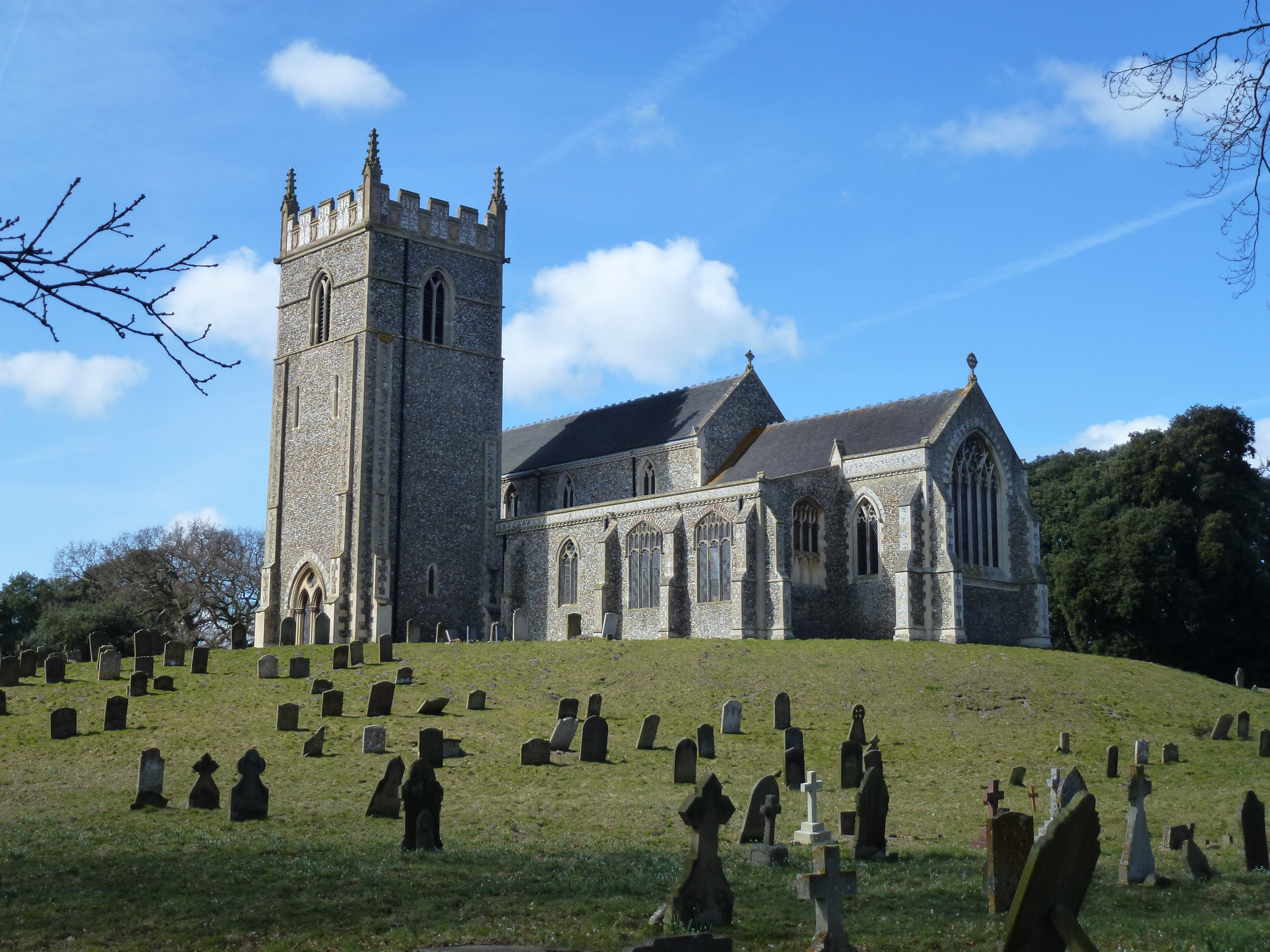

- Location in Norfolk
- OS grid reference: TF 87804 43631
- Location: Holkham, Norfolk
- Country: England
- Denomination: Anglican

History
- Dedication: Wihtburh

Architecture
- Functional status: Church of England parish church
- Heritage designation: Grade II*
- Designated: 6 March 1959
- Architectural type: Church
- Style: Gothic Revival

St Withburga's Church is an active Church of England parish church in the village of Holkham, Norfolk, England. The origins of the church are ancient, possibly either Saxon or Norman but the extant building dates mainly from a Victorian reconstruction carried out between 1868 and 1871. The church is a Grade II* listed building. It stands in the grounds of Holkham Hall, the 18th century house built by Thomas Coke, 1st Earl of Leicester, and contains the graves of many members of the Coke family.

== History ==
The church of St Withburga likely dates from the Saxon or Norman period. Nothing remains of this early church, although the base of the tower is 13th century. The dedication to Wihtburh is believed to be unique. The church was extensively rebuilt in 1767 and was again restored between 1868 and 1871. It serves the village of Holkham, Norfolk as its parish church. It is also the estate church of Holkham Hall and stands entirely surrounded by Holkham Park. The estate has been in possession of the Coke family since the 17th century. They are recorded as living in Norfolk from the early 13th century. The family's rise to wealth and prominence was driven by Edward Coke (1552 – 1634), who served as Solicitor General, Speaker of the House of Commons and Attorney General under both Elizabeth I and James VI and I. Edward Coke amassed extensive estates in Norfolk, and elsewhere in England, but the Holkham property was a later addition, acquired through marriage by his fourth son, John.

The great house at Holkham was built by Thomas Coke, 1st Earl of Leicester, who was born in 1697. The construction took over 30 years and Coke died before it was finished. Created Earl of Leicester in 1744, he died in 1759, and his widow, Margaret (1700–1775), oversaw the completion of the house, and a reconstruction of the church in 1767.

Her later successor as Countess of Leicester, Juliana Whitbread, (1825-1870), married Thomas Coke, 2nd Earl of Leicester in 1843. Juliana instigated an even more extensive restoration of the church under the direction of the architect James K. Colling, which began in 1868. Following her death in 1870, her husband completed the church as a memorial. Juliana was originally buried in a new mausoleum, probably designed by Colling and in a Gothic Revival style, but in 1905 her body was moved into a redesigned Coke burial plot elsewhere in the churchyard, and the mausoleum has since remained unused.

The church contains a memorial to the 19 men of the village who died in World War I, and to the two who died in World War II.

St Withburga's is within the parish of Holkam with Egmere and Quarles, in the Diocese of Norwich. It remains an active parish church with regular services being held in the summer months. (Note: As the church is without heating, winter services are held in the chapel at Holkham Hall.)

== Architecture and description ==
The church stands on a large mound, to the west of the hall. The southern base of the tower dates from the 13th century, but almost everything else is of the 18th and 19th century renovations. The building material is Norfolk flint with limestone ashlar dressings. Bill Wilson, in his 2002 revised Norfolk 2: North-West and South edition of the Pevsner Buildings of England, notes the memorial tomb chest to Juliana, Countess of Leicester, designed by Sir Joseph Edgar Boehm. In the churchyard is the Coke Mausoleum, built in 1870.

== Gallery ==
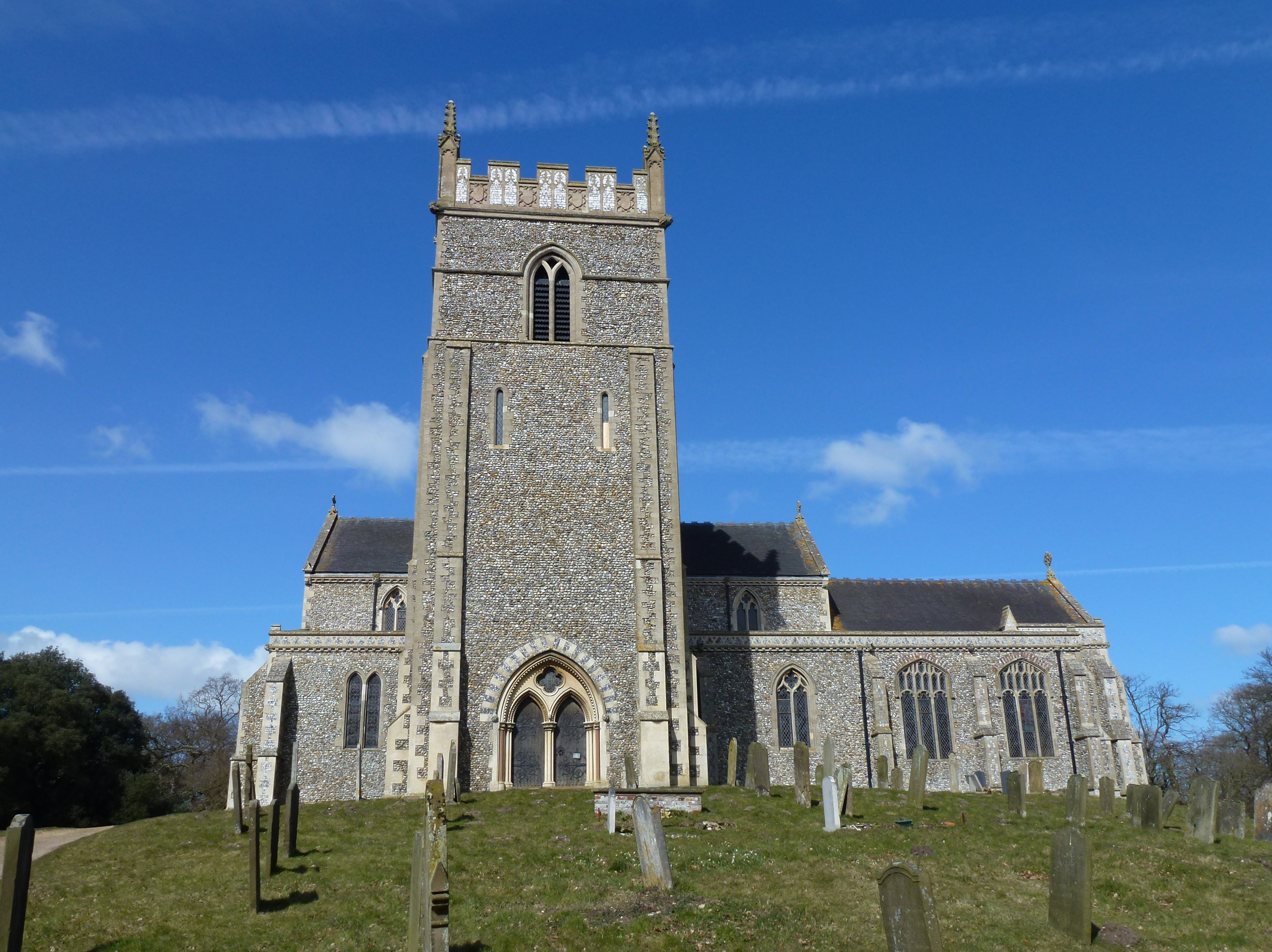
Another view

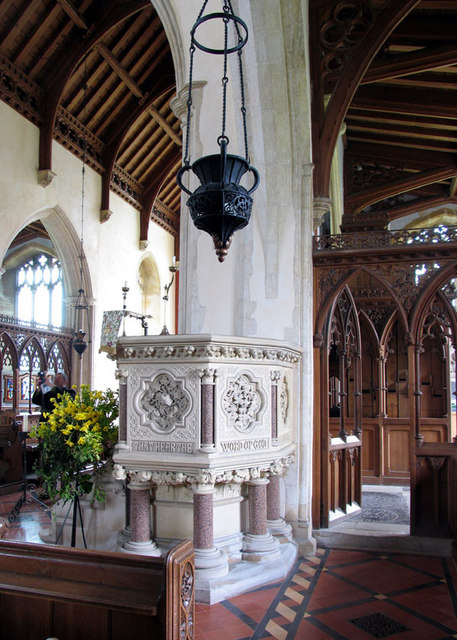
Interior

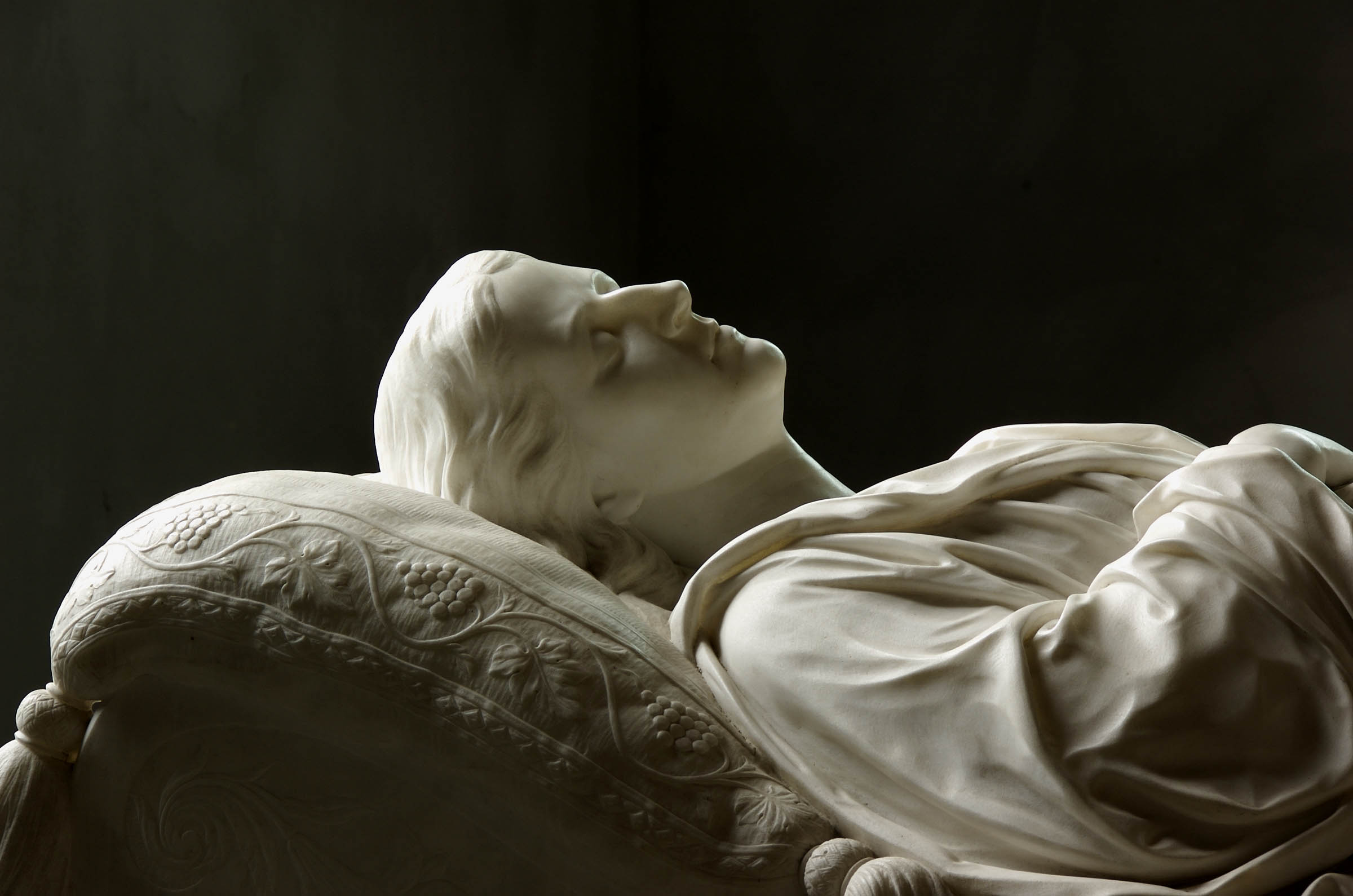
Memorial to Juliana, Countess of Leicester

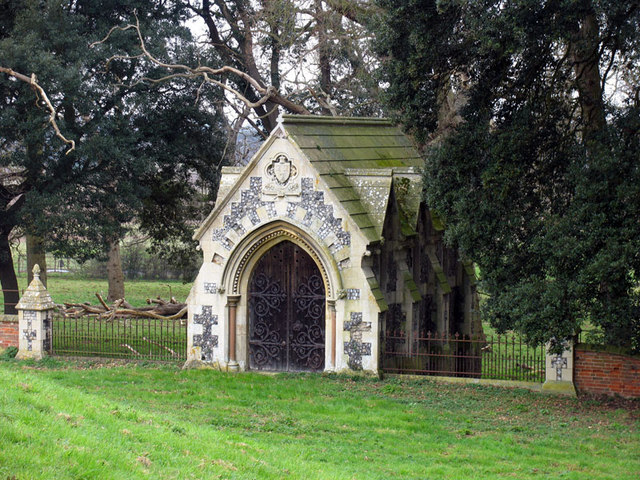
Coke mausoleum

== Sources ==
- Hiskey, Christine (1997). "The Building of Holkham Hall: Newly Discovered Letters" (PDF). Architectural History. 40: 144–158. doi:10.2307/1568671. JSTOR 1568671.
- Jenkins, Simon (2003). England's Thousand Best Houses. London: Penguin Books. ISBN 978-0-713-99596-1. OCLC 52829818.
- Lees-Milne, James (1986) [1962]. The Earls of Creation. London: Century Hutchinson. ISBN 978-0-712-69464-3. OCLC 13994328.
- Pevsner, Nikolaus; Wilson, Bill (2002). Norfolk 2: North-West and South. The Buildings Of England. New Haven, US and London: Yale University Press. ISBN 978-0-300-09657-6.
- Wilson, Michael I. (1984). William Kent: Architect, Designer, Painter, Gardener, 1685–1748. London: Routledge & Kegan Paul. ISBN 0-7100-9983-5.
