= Sennowe Hall =

Country house in Stibbard, Norfolk, England

Coordinates: 52.7916°N 0.9371°E

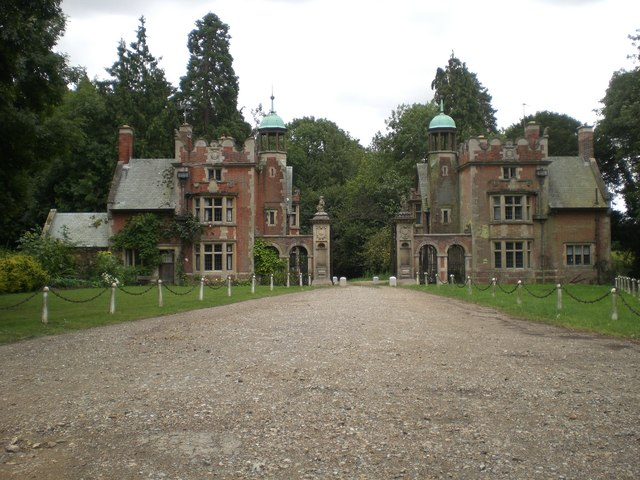
Lodges and gate of Sennowe Hall and park (2007)

Sennowe Hall (also known as Sennowe Park) is a large country house and estate located near the village of Guist in Norfolk, England.

The clock tower, the house and the stables, all located in a landscaped park, are Grade II* listed buildings.

Sennowe Hall was originally a Georgian house built in 1774 by Thomas Wodehouse who had inherited the estate from his aunt Mary Bacon in 1760. It was sold by his son Edmond Wodehouse MP in 1850 and was subsequently owned by the Morse-Boycott family, who had it re-built by Decimus Burton. It then passed into ownership of the lighting engineer Bernard Le Neve Foster.

The estate was bought in 1898 by Thomas Albert Cook, a grandson of Thomas Cook, the founder of the Thomas Cook and Son travel agency. He commissioned the Norwich architect George Skipper to remodel and considerably enlarge the house. The house and its surrounding estate are still owned by his descendants.

The hall was the main filming location for The Tragedy at Marsdon Manor, an episode of the television series Agatha Christie's Poirot.
