= Sutton Windmill, Norfolk =

Windmill in Sutton, Norfolk, England

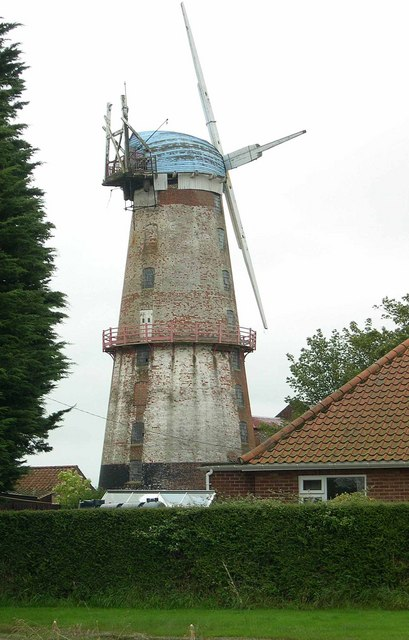
- Sutton Windmill, August 2004
- Interactive map of Sutton Windmill, Norfolk

Origin
- Mill name: Sutton Windmill
- Mill location: Sutton, Norfolk, United Kingdom
- Grid reference: TG 3956 2387
- Coordinates: 52°45′36″N 1°33′00″E
- Year built: 1780s

Information
- Purpose: Corn mill
- Type: Tower mill
- Storeys: Eight storeys (as built), nine storeys (as rebuilt)
- No. of sails: Four
- Type of sails: Common sails, later Patent sails
- Windshaft: Cast iron
- Winding: Fantail
- Fantail blades: Ten
- No. of pairs of millstones: Four

Sutton Windmill is a Grade II* listed tower mill in Sutton, Norfolk, United Kingdom. It was built in 1789 and worked until 1940. The mill is under restoration.

== History ==
Sutton Windmill was first advertised for sale in May 1788. At that time, it had three pairs of millstones, and Common sails. John Bygraves was the miller in 1815. Two mills are marked on Bryant's 1824 map of Norfolk with the annotation "Sutton Mills". Bygrave had died by 1828. His son John inherited the mill. In 1845, Bygrave's grandson John was the miller. Patent sails had been fitted to the mill by 1858. The mill was destroyed by fire in 1861. Thomas Worts had taken the mill by then, and the mill was to remain in the Worts family until 1975. The mill was rebuilt by Englands, millwrights of Ludham, Norfolk. An extra storey was added to the eight storey tower. The mill was struck by lightning on 19 July 1875, severely damaging a sail. Thomas Worts ran the mill until 1912. He was followed by his son Frank. The mill was again struck by lightning in 1940, and ceased to work.

The mill became derelict. It was listed Grade II* on 16 April 1955. Preservation was considered in 1959, but the plan did not go ahead. The mill was surveyed by Arthur C. Smith on 23 October 1970. At the time, the mill retained one sail and the remains of two stocks. The mill was sold to Chris Nunn in 1975. He started to restore the mill in 1976. A grant of £12,000 was given by the Environment Secretary towards the costs of restoration. A new fantail was fitted to the cap in 1978. by 1980, the mill was open to the public between March and October. In September 1980, three pieces of Douglas fir timber 12 inches (300 mm) square and 66 feet 0 inches (20.12 m) long were delivered to the mill. These were to be used for the stocks, including a spare. By 2004, the mill was becoming dilapidated. In 2006, Nunn closed the mill museum due to his ill health. Norfolk County Council placed the mill on its Heritage at Risk Register. The mill was taken over by Yesterday's World. They reopened the mill, but closed it in September 2008 as it was losing money. In February 2011, the cap started to disintegrate, forcing a diversion of the Weavers' Way, which passed close to the tower.

Work to restore the mill began in 2014. The stocks and cap were removed in September of that year. In December 2017, it was proposed that the mill would be used as a training centre to train five people in the art of millwrighting under a plan put forward by the Mills Section of to Society for the Protection of Ancient Buildings. North Norfolk District Council were asked to provide a £350,000 loan towards the project. In April 2018, the mill was sold to a private buyer, bringing an end to the plan. The buyers were Kyle Smart and Lisa Smith, who started restoring the mill. The new cap and fantail were fitted to the mill in May 2021 and new stocks were fitted in May 2024.

== Description ==
Sutton Windmill is a nine storey tower mill. The tower is about 67 feet 6 inches (20.57 m) tall. It is 33 feet 0 inches (10.06 m) outside diameter at the base. The walls are over 3 feet (0.91 m) thick. The tower is 16 feet 0 inches (4.88 m) diameter at curb level. The mill is 79 feet 6 inches (24.23 m) to the top of the cap. It has a boat shape cap with a petticoat and gallery. Four double Patent sails were carried on a cast iron windshaft. The sails had ten bays of three shutters originally, later replaced with sails having nine bays of three shutters. These sails were 9 feet 4 inches (2.84 m) wide and had a span of 73 feet (22 m). The mill was winded by a ten-bladed fantail. The windshaft carries a 9 feet 0 inches (2.74 m) diameter cast iron brake wheel which has 88 cogs. It drives the 31-cog cast iron wallower at the top of the upright shaft. Four pairs of millstones are driven underdrift.
