= Saint John the Baptist's Head, Trimingham =

Saint John the Baptist's Head
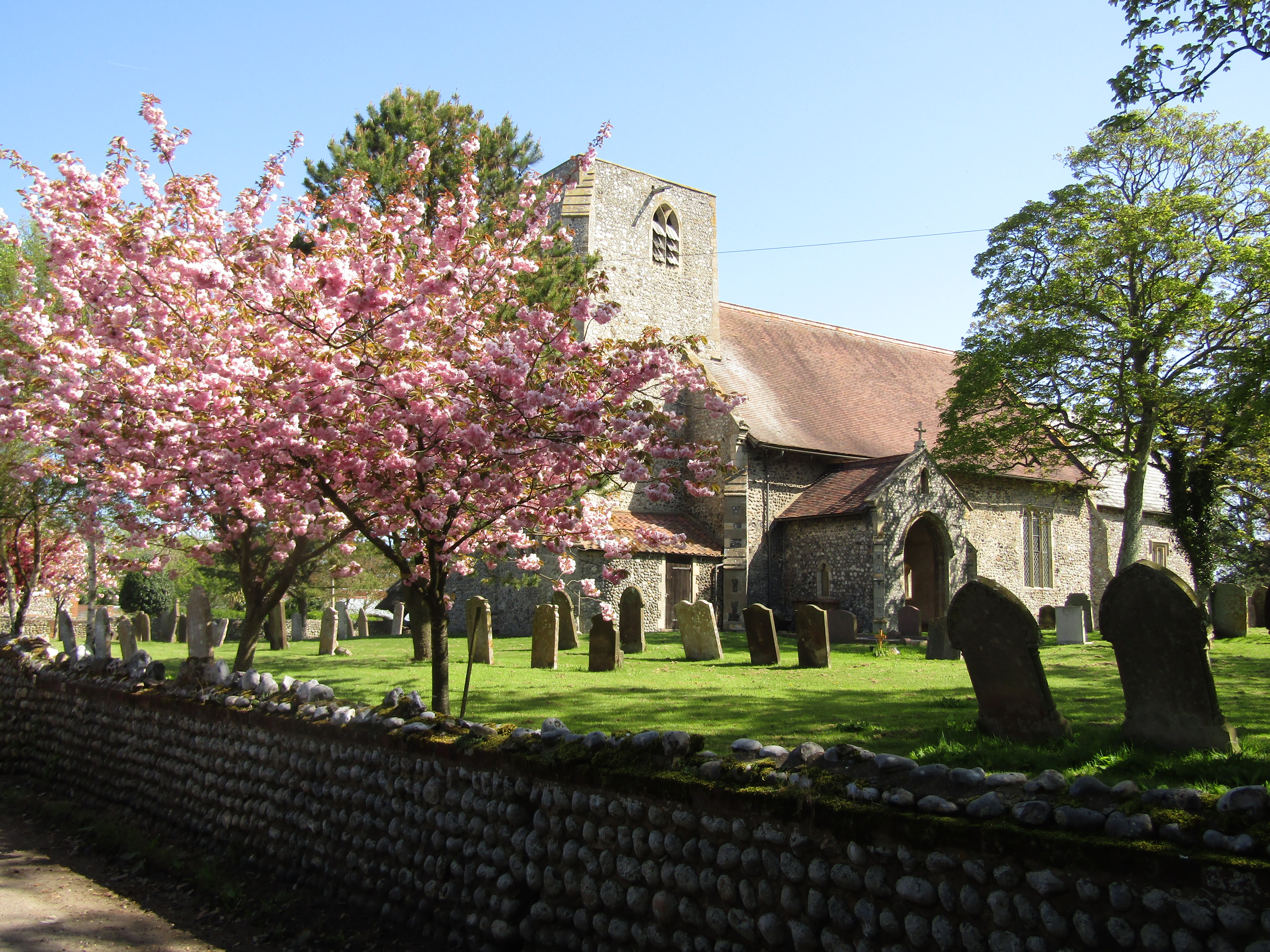
- South facing elevation

- Location within Norfolk

General information
- Location: Trimingham, England
- Coordinates: 52.897912°N 1.387466°E
- Completed: 13th century

The church of Saint John the Baptist's Head is the Parish church of the coastal village and parish of Trimingham in the English county of Norfolk, England, United Kingdom. The building is a Grade II* listed building. The church is within the Church of England Diocese of Norwich, Norfolk, England.

== Dedication ==
The church gets its unusual dedication from the fact that in the medieval period there was a life size alabaster head modelled from the relic which was believed to be the real head of John the Baptist which was kept at Amiens Cathedral. The head was kept on a shrine altar and during his time period the church became a place of pilgrimage for people all over the country to see the head rather than travel to Amiens.

== Description ==
This small flint church stands on the coast road in the centre of the village of Trimingham. The main gateway into the churchyard is through a thatched lychgate on church street. The roof is slate and tiles with leadwork. The greater part of the church is built in the Perpendicular style and has a rather short squat west bell tower which was built around 1300 and has no parapet. A prominent feature of the churches bell tower are the large solid stone dressed flint buttress on the corners of the tower. The buttress to the north west corner has a bench mark carved into the masonry at its base.

== Gallery ==
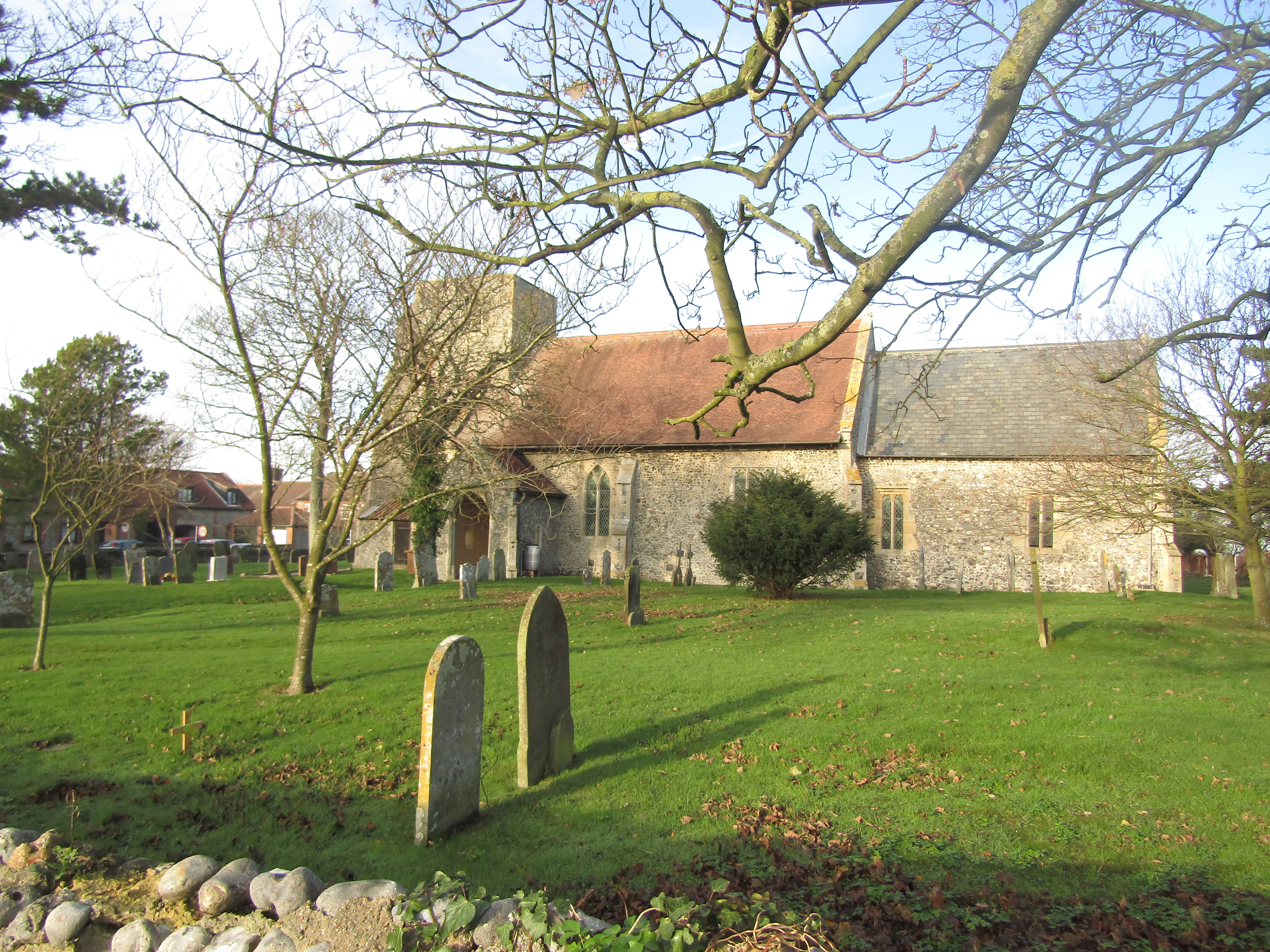
South Elevation

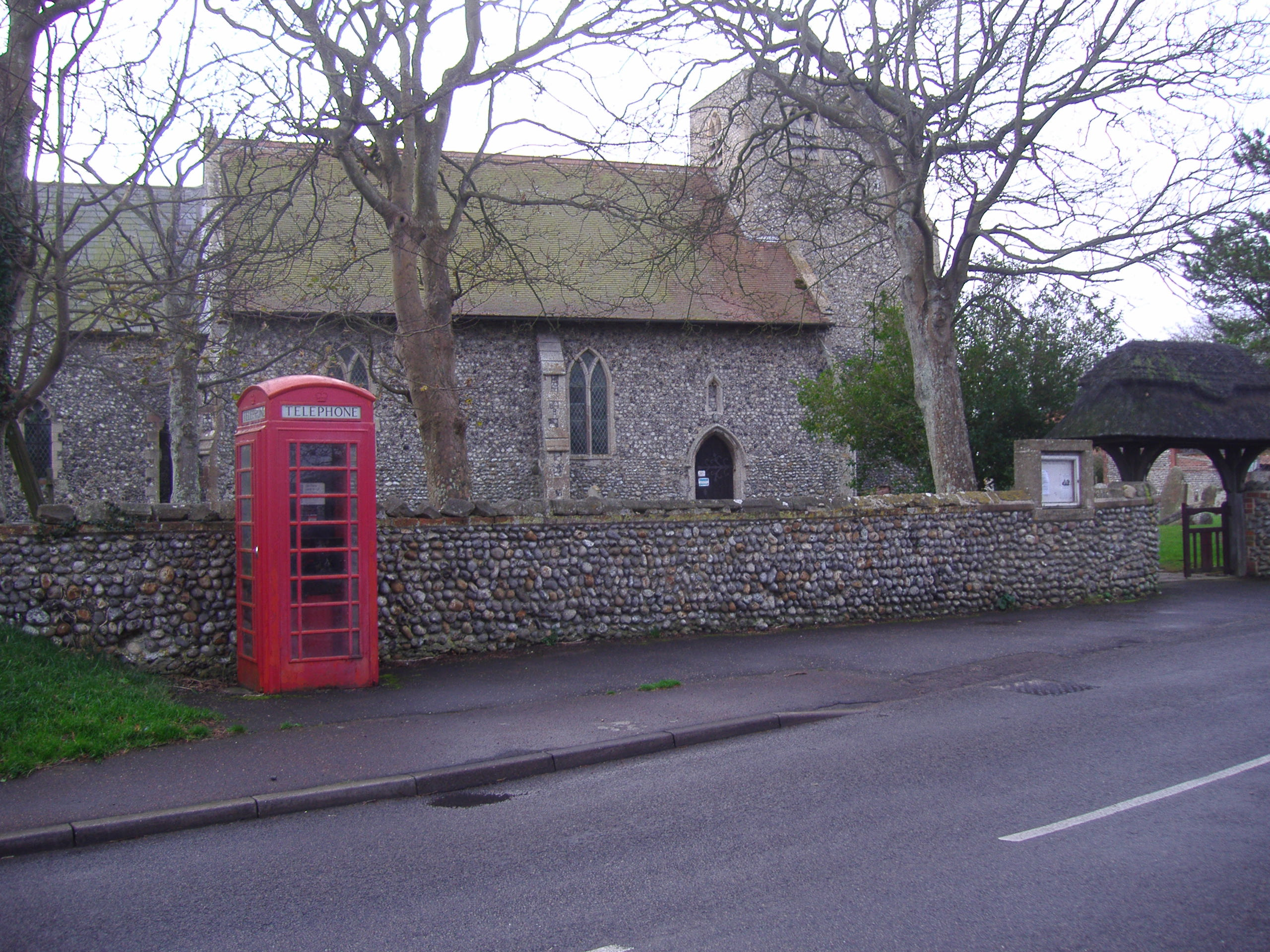
North Elevation

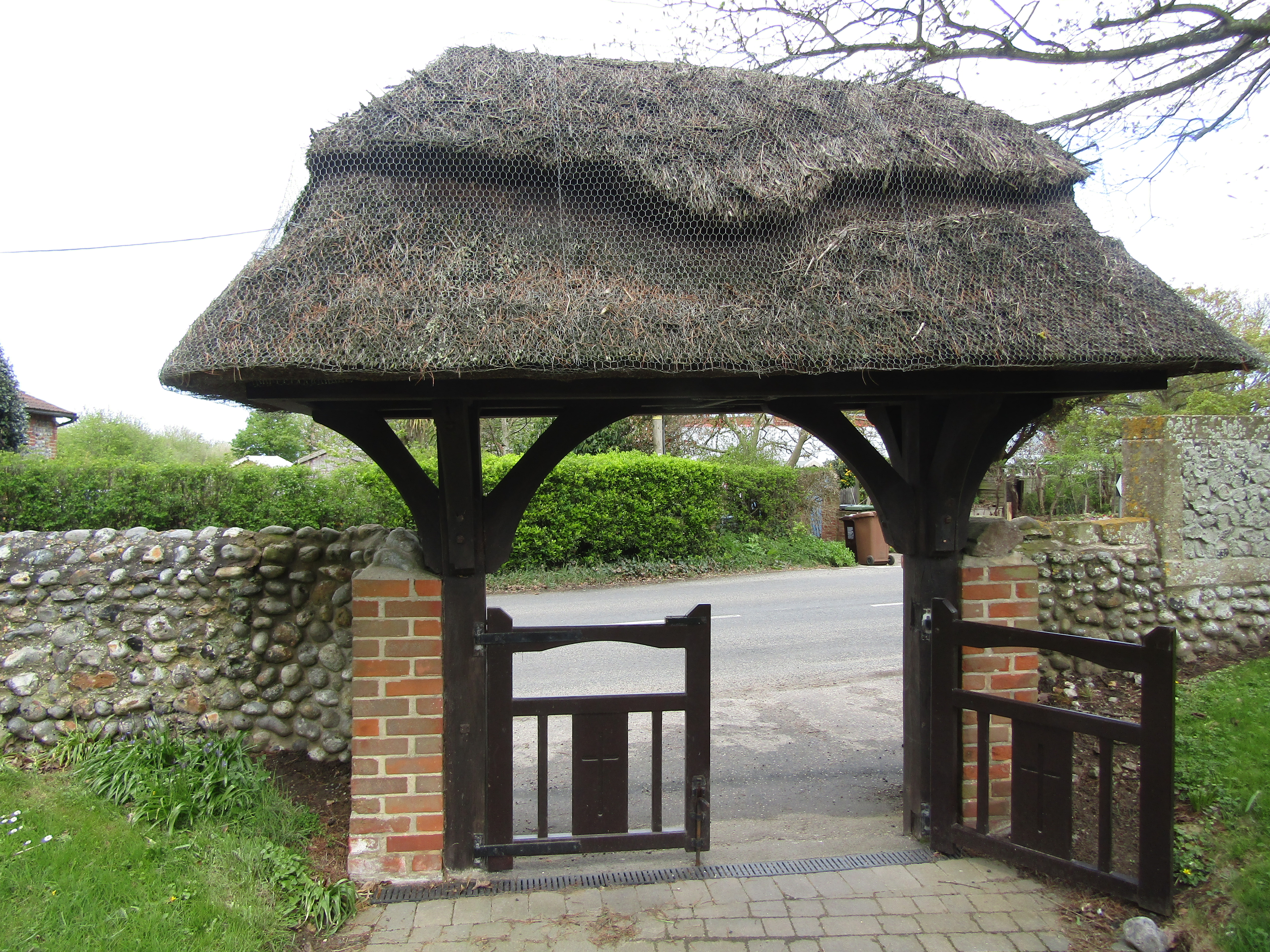
Lychgate

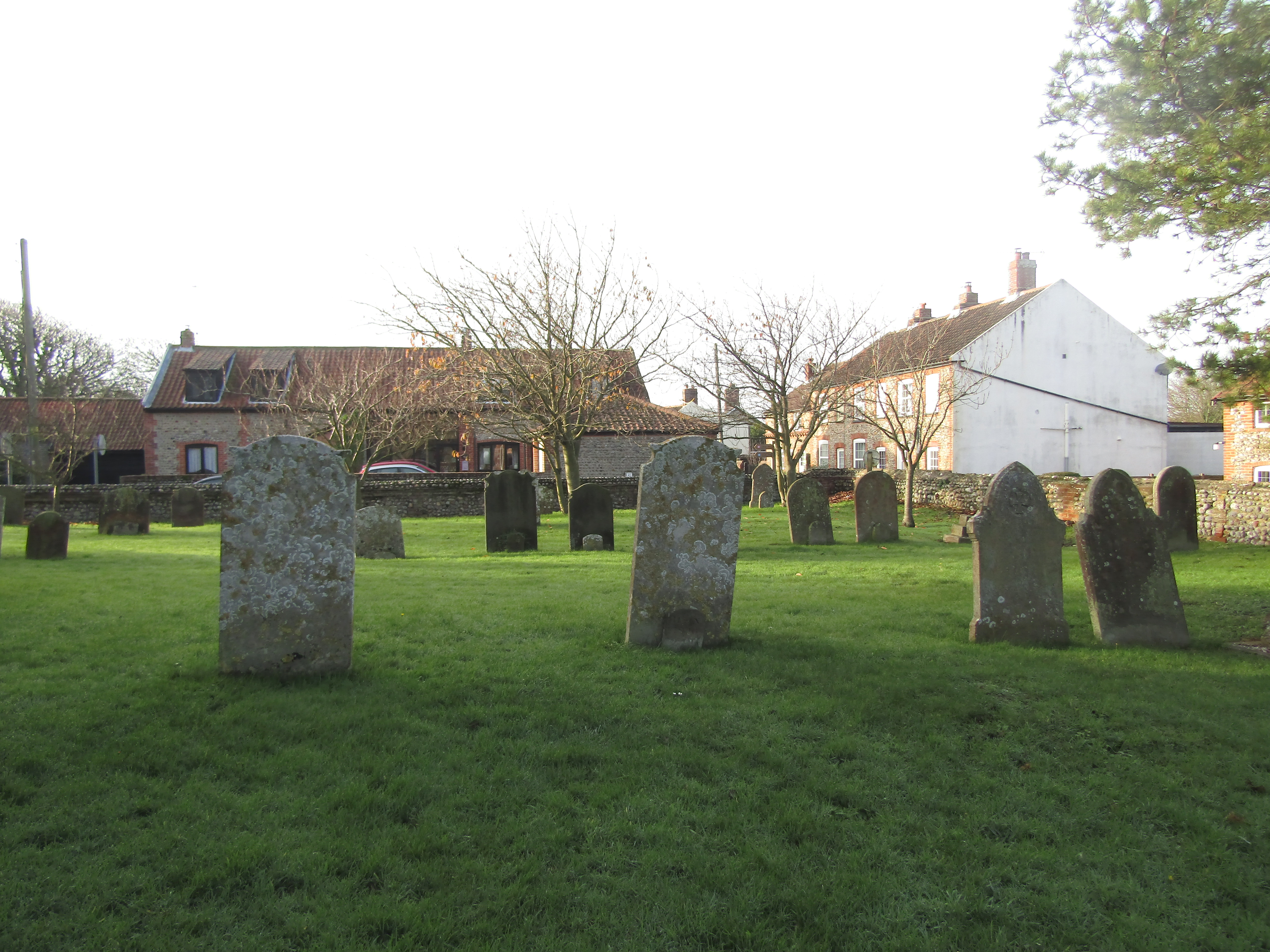
Churchyard

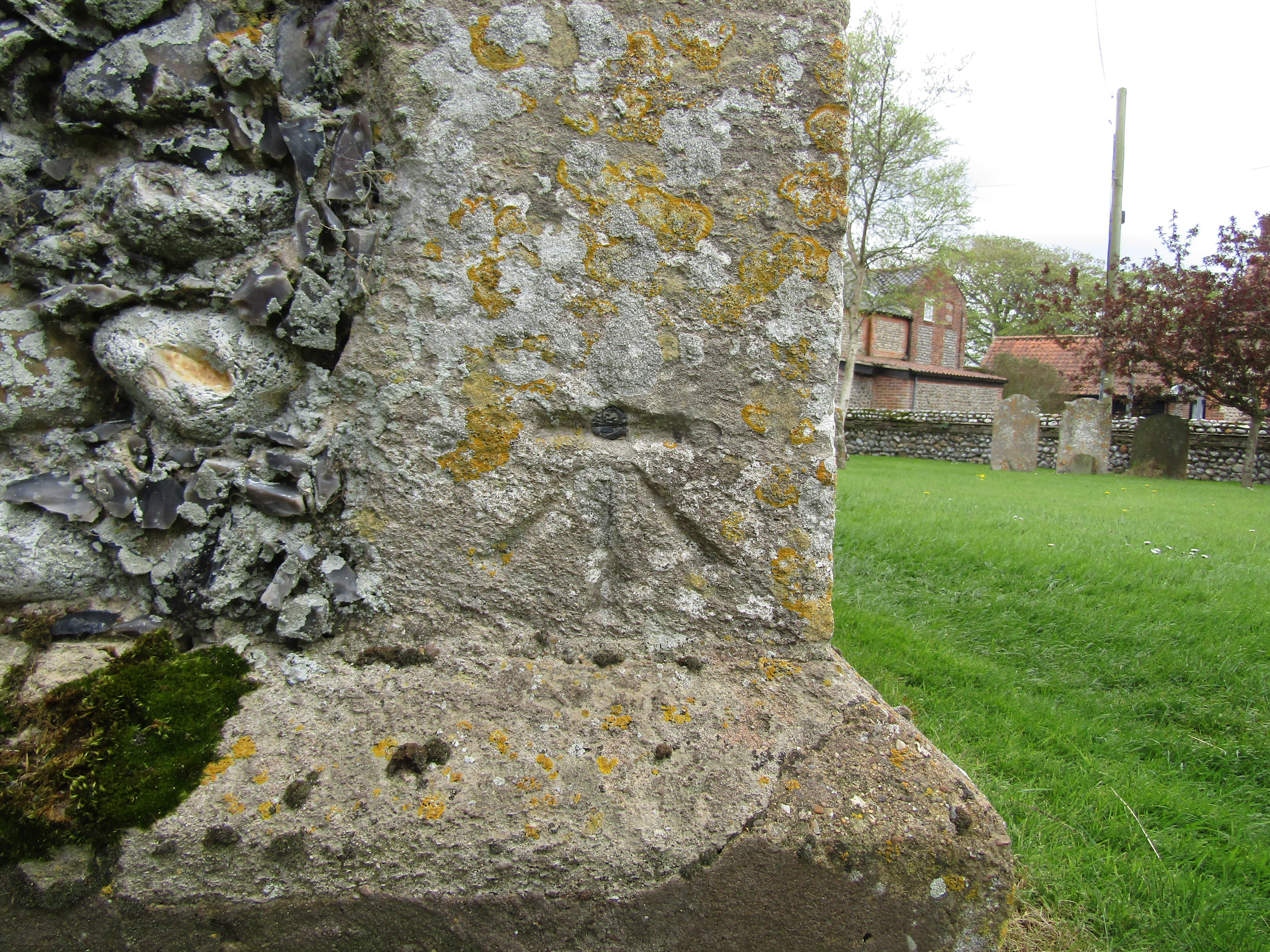
Benchmark at the base of the bell tower

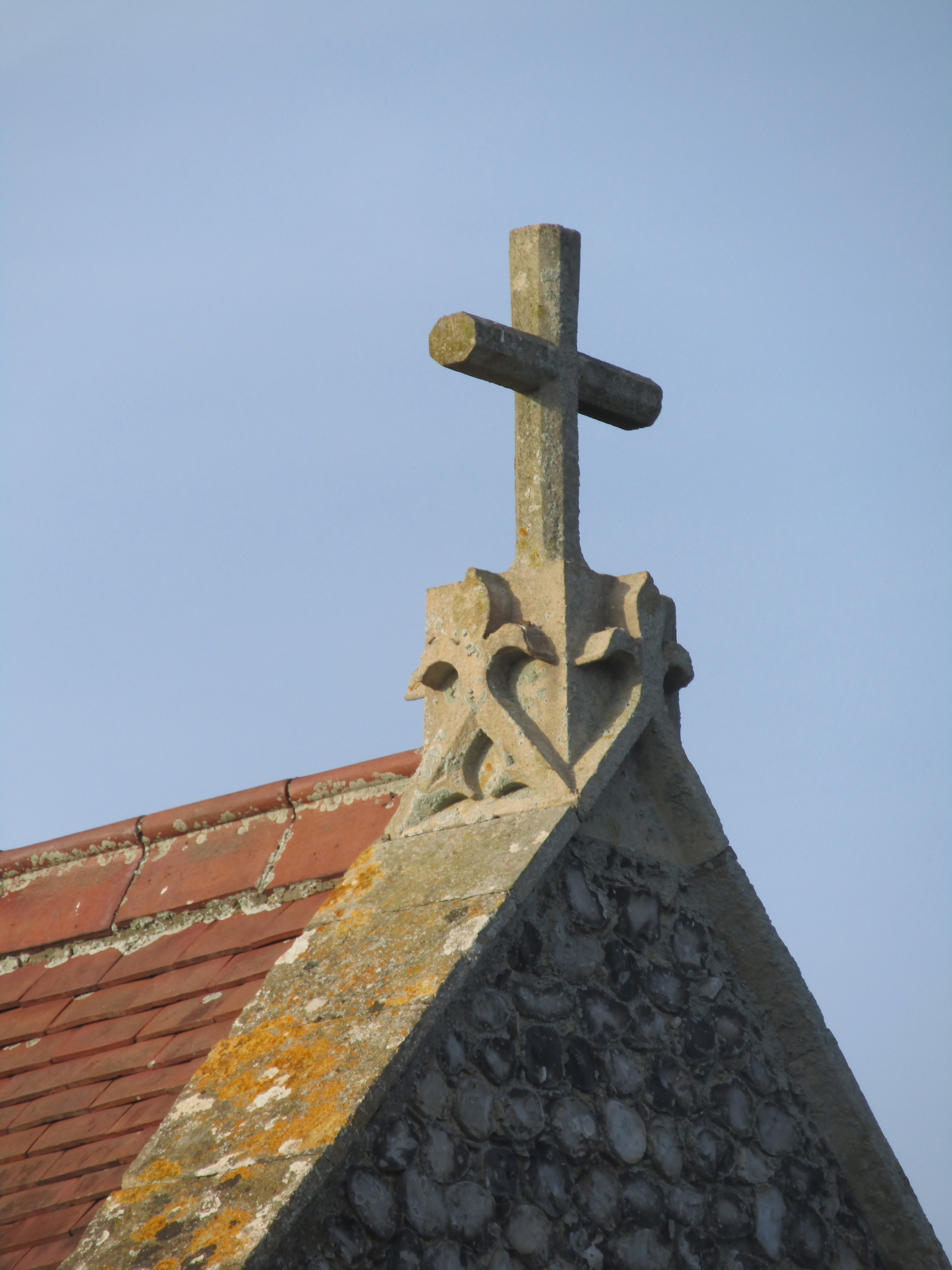
Apex cross

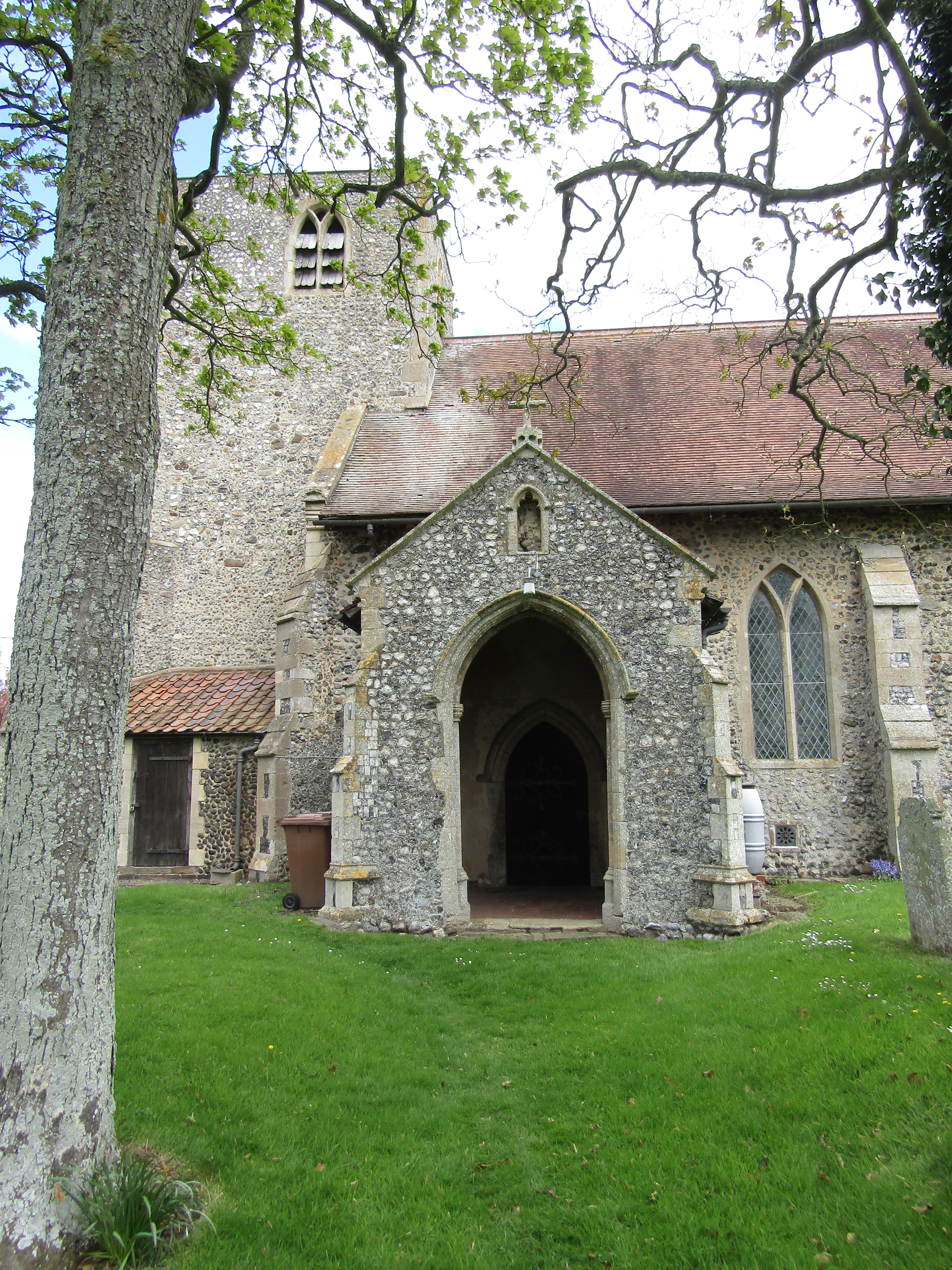
Porch
