= Cley Windmill =

Tower mill in Norfolk, England

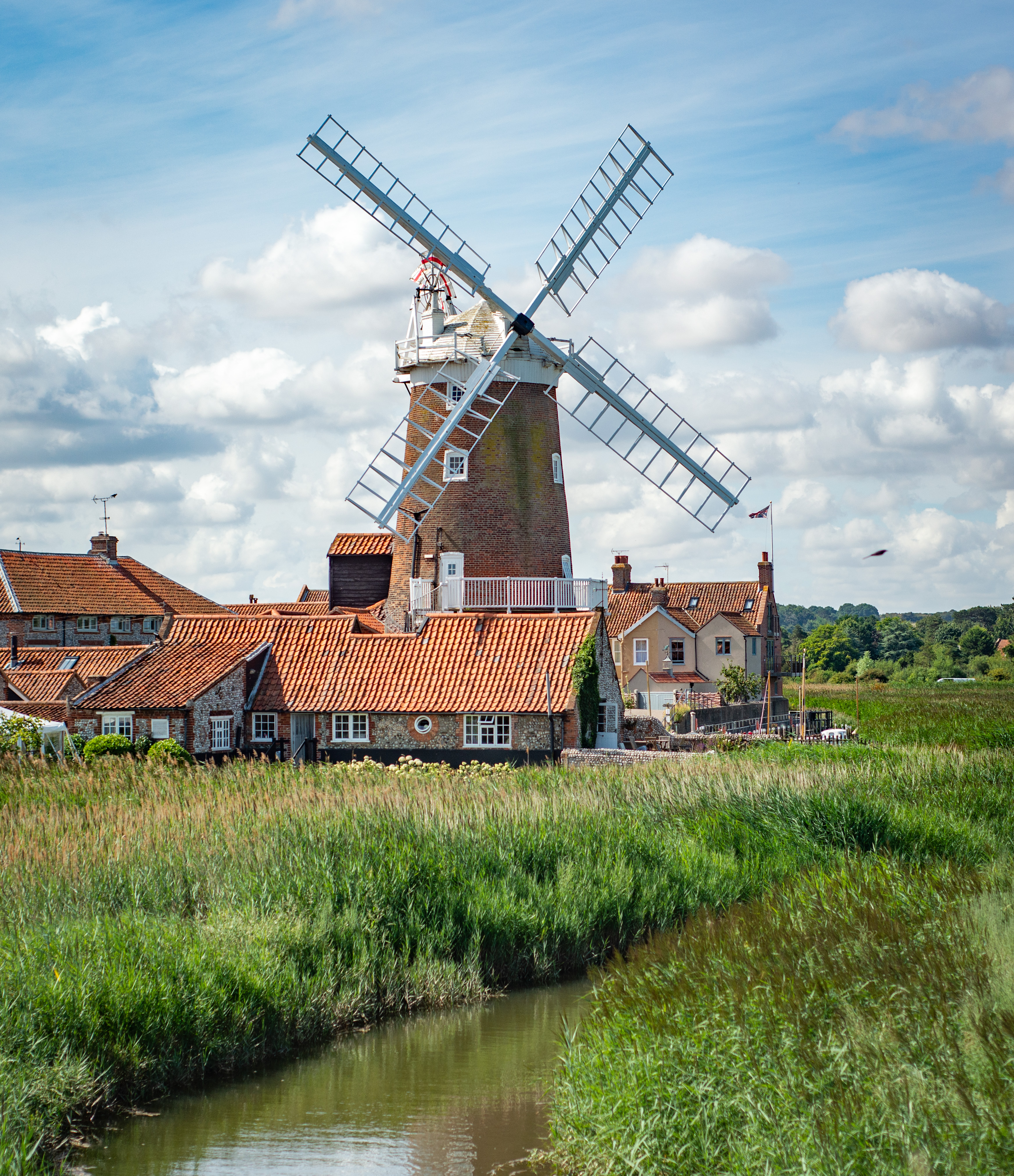
- The mill in 2022
- Interactive map of Cley Windmill

Origin
- Mill name: Cley Mill
- Mill location: TG 0449 4404
- Coordinates: 52°57′16″N 1°02′34″E
- Operator: Private
- Year built: Early 19th century

Information
- Purpose: Corn mill
- Type: Tower mill
- Storeys: Five storeys
- No. of sails: Four sails
- Type of sails: Double Patent sails
- Windshaft: Cast iron
- Winding: Fantail
- Fantail blades: Eight blades
- No. of pairs of millstones: Three pairs

Cley Windmill is a Grade II* listed tower mill at Cley next the Sea, Norfolk, England which has been converted to hotel accommodation.

== History ==
Cley Windmill was built in the early 19th century. It was not marked on William Faden's map of Norfolk published in 1797. The first mention was an advert in the Norfolk Chronicle of 26 June 1819, where the mill was for sale, described as "newly erected" and in the ownership of the Farthing family. The mill was not sold and remained the property of the Farthing family, until 1875, when Dorothy Farthing, the then owner, died. The mill was bought by the miller, Stephen Barnabas Burroughes. It was worked by the Burroughes family until c. 1912, when the business was transferred to their windmill at Holt.

In 1921, the windmill was sold by the Burroughes brothers to Mrs Sarah Maria Wilson for the sum of £350 and she had the mill converted to a holiday home. The architect responsible for the conversion was Cecil Upcher. The machinery was removed, with the gear wheels being cut in half and used as decoration within the mill.

The mill was inherited by Lieutenant Colonel Hubert Blount, in 1934. On 31 January 1953, the mill was flooded to a depth of at least 8 feet (2.44 m). In 1960, Norfolk County Council and the Pilgrim Trust both made grants to enable the sails to be replaced, the council granting £500 and the trust granting £300 towards a total cost of £1,500. The work was done by R Thompson & Son, the Alford, Lincolnshire millwrights. Further grants were received by Lt Col Blount from Norfolk County Council in 1963 and 1971.

Lt Col Blount died on 1 February 1979 and the mill was inherited by his youngest son, Colonel Charles Blount, father of the singer James Blunt, who spent much time there as a child. The mill was offered for sale in May 1982, but did not sell. In 1983, planning permission and listed building consent was sought from North Norfolk District Council to turn the mill and complex into a guesthouse and self-catering units. This was granted, with the mill opening as a guesthouse on 27 April 1983.

In 1986–87, the cap gallery, sails and fantail were renewed. Grants totalling £19,000 were given by English Heritage and Norfolk County Council towards an estimated cost of £45,000. The work was done by millwrights John Lawn and John Bond.

In December 2006 the windmill was put up for sale for the sum of £1,500,000, and was bought by Julian and Carolyn Godlee. The Godlees embarked on widescale restoration works to the mill and outbuildings. Works included replacing the balcony in hardwood and converting the old cart shed to an office with accommodation. In 2014 the sails, fan-tail and oak fan-stage were replaced using the firm Bunting and Son.

The landmark was again for sale in 2019, believed to be in the region of £3m. It was bought in 2021 by Natalie and Varian Bush.

== Description ==
Cley Windmill is a five-storey tower mill with a stage at second floor level, twenty feet above ground. It has a dome shaped cap with a gallery which was winded by an eight-bladed fantail, ten feet six inches in diameter. The cap is now fixed and unable to turn to wind. There are four double Patent sails with a span of 70 ft, carried on stocks 56 feet (17.07 m) long. The inner pair have eight bays of three shutters and the outer pair have nine bays of two shutters and one of three shutters. In 1819 the sails powered two pairs of French burr millstones, a flour mill and jumper but by 1876 this had been increased to three pairs of stones and a smut machine had been added.

== Millers ==
- John Farthing (1819–22)
- John Lee (1822–48)
- William Edward Powell (1848–50)
- Lawrence Randall (1853–72)
- Stephen Barnabas Burroughes (1875–1900)
- Burroughes Bros (1900–12)

Reference for above:

== Public access ==
Cley Windmill is open to the public as a guesthouse on a bed and breakfast basis.

== Culture and media ==
The BBC One balloon over Cley Windmill

Cley Windmill has become one of the enduring icons of North Norfolk. Its image has been used on everything from tea towels through to greetings cards, tins of biscuits and fudge to a station identification (ident) between programmes for the BBC. One of the BBC One 'Balloon' idents, used after October 1998, showed the BBC hot air balloon floating past various locations in the UK, including Cley Windmill.

Cley Windmill is licensed to hold wedding ceremonies.
