= Hobb's Mill =

Windmill in Horning, Norfolk, England

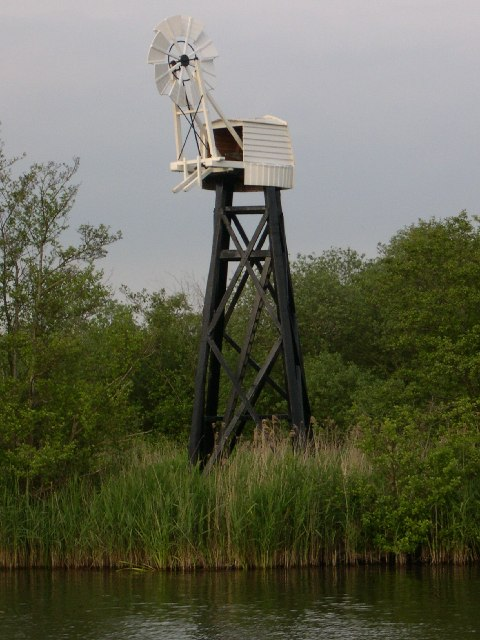
- Hobb's Mill, May 2004
- Interactive map of Hobb's Mill

Origin
- Mill name: Hobb's Mill
- Mill location: Horning, Norfolk, United Kingdom
- Grid reference: TG 3475 1628
- Coordinates: 52°41′28″N 1°28′19″E
- Year built: Late 19th century

Information
- Purpose: Drainage mill
- Type: Trestle mill
- Smock sides: Four
- No. of sails: Four
- Windshaft: Cast iron
- Winding: Fantail
- Fantail blades: Eight
- Type of pump: Scoopwheel

Hobb's Mill is a Grade II* listed trestle mill which stands by the side of the River Bure at Horning, Norfolk, United Kingdom. Built in the late 19th century, it has been restored.

== History ==
Hobb's Mill was built in the late 19th century. It worked until c. 1933. Arthur C. Smith surveyed the mill on 22 May 1978. He described the mill as derelict and leaning. The mill had lost its cap, sails and fantail, but retained its machinery and scoopwheel. In 1983, Caston millwright John Lawn started work restoring the mill. The mill was listed Grade II* on 12 May 1987. Smith surveyed the mill again on 22 June 1988. He noted that the mill was then under restoration. It had been fitted with a cap and fantail.

== Description ==
Hobb's Mill is a trestle mill. A cast iron windshaft carried four sails. The mill was winded by a fantail. It drove a scoopwheel. Although said to be the only trestle mill to do so, St Olaves Windpump originally drove one.
