= Eelfleet Dyke Mill, Potter Heigham =

Windmill in Potter Heigham, Norfolk, England

- Eelfleet Dyke Mill, August 2015
- Interactive map of Eelfleet Dyke Mill, Potter Heigham

Origin
- Mill name: Eelfleet Dyke Mill, Watson's Mill
- Mill location: Potter Heigham, Norfolk, United Kingdom
- Grid reference: TG 4496 2024
- Coordinates: 52°43′17″N 1°37′34″E
- Year built: 19th century

Information
- Purpose: Drainage mill
- Type: Tower mill
- Storeys: Four storeys
- No. of sails: Four
- Type of sails: Patent sails
- Windshaft: Cast iron
- Winding: fantail
- Type of pump: Originally a scoopwheel, later an Appold turbine

Eelfleet Dyke or Watson's Mill is a Grade II* listed tower mill at Potter Heigham, Norfolk, United Kingdom. A drainage mill built in the 19th century, it has been conserved.

== History ==
Eelfleet Dyke Mill was built in the "mid 1800s". It was marked on the 1871 Ordnance Survey map as "Watson's marsh mill". It was derelict by 1950. Arthur C. Smith surveyed the mill on 10 April 1972. He described the mill as derelict with a collapsed cap and fan cradle. The mill had two stocks and the remains of three Patent sails. It retained its internal machinery. Smith surveyed the mill again on 22 May 1986 and 19 May 1989. He described the mill as preserved, but only having the remains of one sail. The mill was then in the care of the Norfolk Windmills Trust. Heigham Holmes, which the mill stands on, was acquired by the National Trust in 1987. The mill was listed Grade II* on 12 May 1987. An aluminium cap had been fitted to the mill by May 1989.

== Description ==
Eelfleet Dyke Mill is a four storey tower mill. It had a boat shape cape. Four Patent Sails were carried on a cast iron windshaft. The sails had eight bays. The mill was winded by a fantail. The upright shaft is of wood and in two sections. The crown wheel is of cast iron. The mill originally had a scoopwheel. It was subsequently replaced by an Appold turbine.
