= St Benet's Level Windpump =

Windmill in Norfolk, England

- St Benet's Level Mill, September 2015
- Interactive map of St Benet's Level Windpump

Origin
- Mill name: St Benet's Level Mill
- Mill location: Ludham, Norfolk, United Kingdom
- Grid reference: TG 3696 1882
- Coordinates: 52°41′06″N 1°32′58″E
- Operator: Crown Estate
- Year built: C.1775

Information
- Purpose: Drainage mill
- Type: Tower mill
- Storeys: Four storeys
- No. of sails: Four
- Type of sails: Patent sails
- Windshaft: Cast iron
- Winding: Fantail
- Fantail blades: Ten
- Type of pump: Appold turbine

St Benet's Level Windpump is a Grade II* listed tower mill at Ludham, Norfolk, United Kingdom. A drainage mill built c.1775, it has been restored.

== History ==
St Benet's Level Windpump was built c.1775. In the second half of the 19th century, an American Halladay windmill with a 40 feet (12 m) tower and a 30 feet (9.1 m) diameter annular sail was erected on the top of the tower. This blew down between 1895 and 1898. Daniel England, the Ludham millwright was commissioned to restore the mill. He raised the tower by 10 feet (3.0 m). A new cap, Patent sails and fantail were fitted.

The mill had ceased working by c.1965. A painting shows that it was then missing its sails and fantail. Arthur C. Smith surveyed the mill on 21 May 1973. He described the mill as derelict with its cap, fanstage and stocks. He stated that the mill was then owned by Norwich Union Life Insurance Company. The mill was restored later that year by millwrights Lennard & Lawn. Further restoration was carried out in the 1980s by millwright Richard Seago. The mill was listed Grade II* on 12 May 1987. Seago did further restoration work on the mill in the 1990s. The mill came into the ownership of the Crown Estate in 2007.

== Description ==
As built, St Benet's Level Windpump was a three storey tower mill. It had four Common sails and was winded by a tailpole. The mill is a four storey tower mill with a boat shape cap with a petticoat and gallery. Four double Patent sails are carried on a cast iron windshaft. The mill is winded by a ten-blade fantail. The mill drives an Appold turbine.
