= Church of St Bartholomew, Hanworth =

Church in Norfolk, England

Coordinates: 52°51′59″N 1°16′18″E

St. Bartholomew's Church
- St. Bartholomew's Church, Hanworth
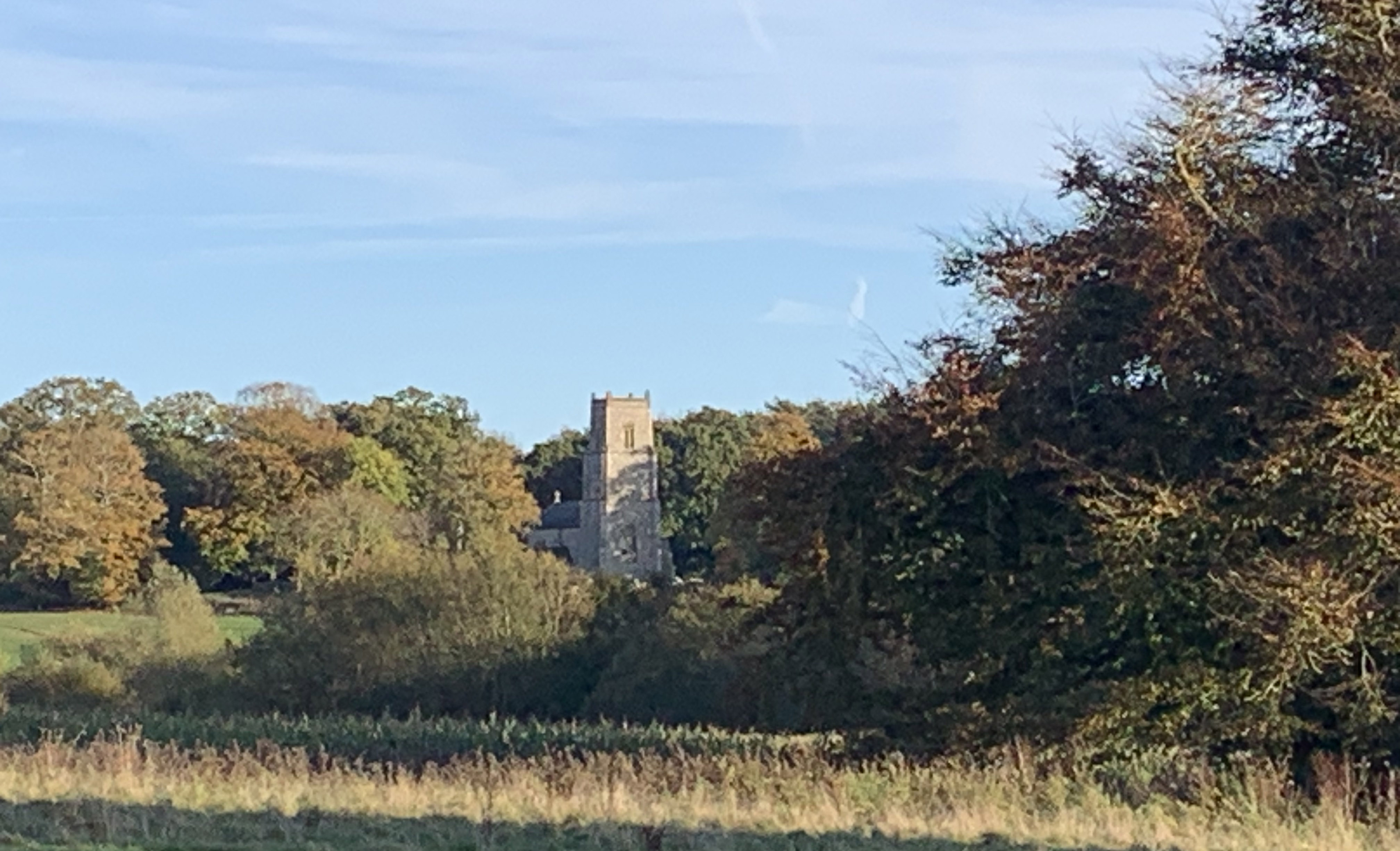
- St. Bartholomew's Church, Hanworth
- St. Bartholomew's Church
- Location: Hanworth, Norfolk
- Country: England
- Denomination: Church of England
- Churchmanship: Broad Church

History
- Status: Parish church

Architecture
- Functional status: Active
- Heritage designation: Grade II* listed
- Architectural type: Church
- Style: Early English
- Completed: 14th century

Specifications
- Materials: Flint with stone dressings

Administration
- Province: Province of Canterbury
- Diocese: Diocese of Norwich
- Parish: Hanworth

Clergy
- Vicar: Canon Heather Butcher

St. Bartholomew's Church, Hanworth is a historic parish church located near the village of Hanworth, Norfolk, England. It is part of the Church of England and is designated as a grade II* listed building. The church is built in the Early English style with some Saxon stonework. It is located a short distance from Hanworth Hall.

== History ==
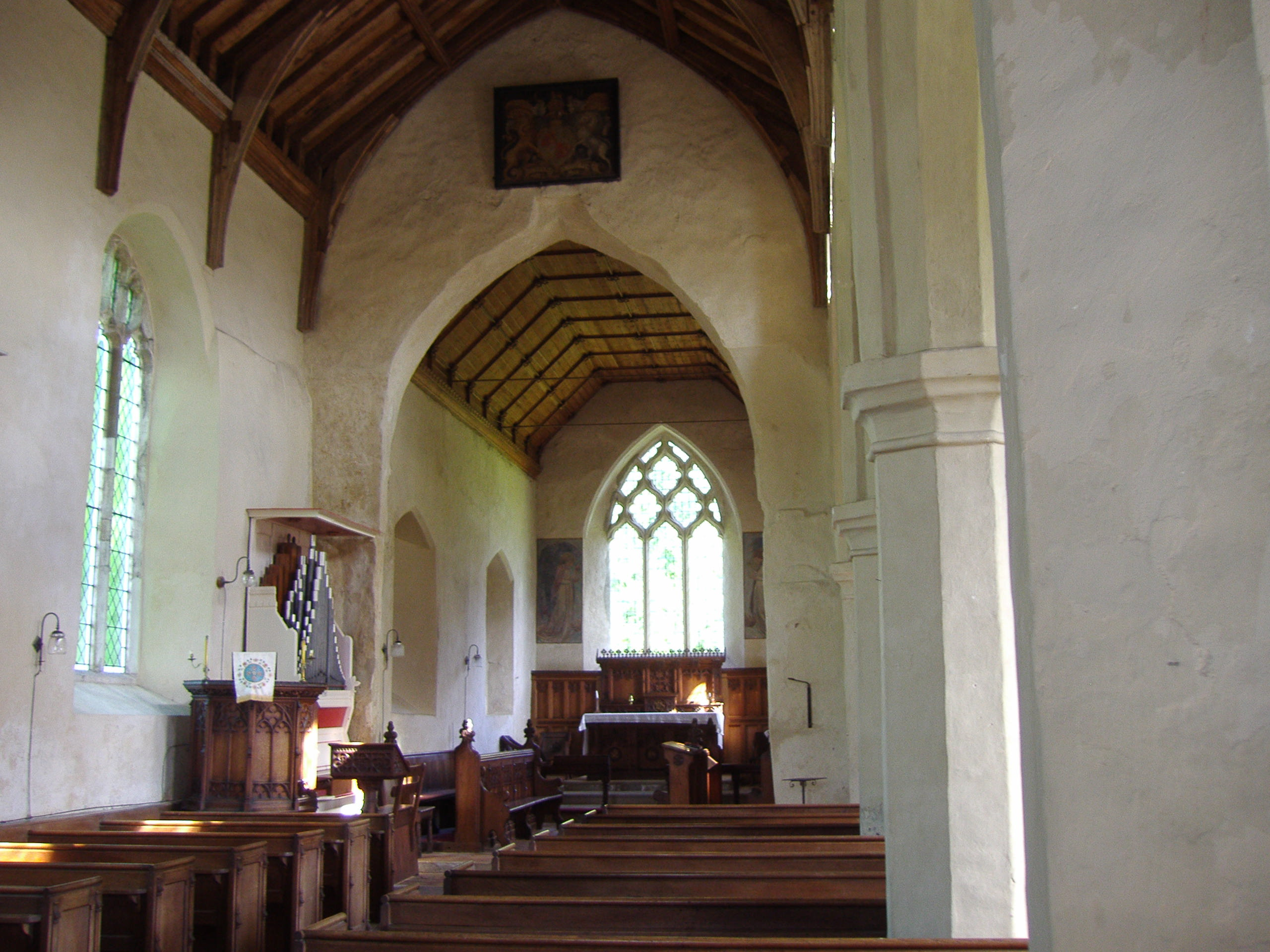
St Bartholomew's Church, Hanworth Interior

St. Bartholomew's Church largely dates back to the 14th century and reflects traditional English church architecture. There is some Saxon stone work in the north chancel wall. The church is primarily constructed of flint with stone dressings, a common feature in Norfolk churches.

== Architecture ==
The church is designed in the Early English style, characterized by pointed arches and stained glass windows, though only fragments of medieval glass remain. Notable features include a Norman font, wooden pews, and a bell tower. The aisle and clerestory were added to the south side in the 15th century. The west tower was also added in the 15th century, built of local flint, with ornately traceried sound holes. The clerestory has eight two-light windows with alternate brick and flint voussoirs.

St. Bartholomew's Church became a Grade II* listed building on 4 October 1960, marking it as a structure of special architectural and historic interest.

== St Bartholomew Today ==
Inside, St Bartholomew features a simple nave with timber beams and a chancel adorned with medieval carvings. Notable furnishings include an 18th-century pulpit and a stone altar. The stained glass windows depict scenes from the life of St. Bartholomew. The octagonal font is Norman, predating the church by some centuries.

Memorials inside the church include members of the Doughty and Barclay families, owners of nearby Hanworth Hall. Among them is a memorial to James Barclay, an RAF pilot who died in a raid on Catania in 1941, aged 19. Interior objects of note include a Tudor iron-bound chest. The church has its original bells (though these are not ringable) and retains its medieval bell-frame. The altar table was installed in 1564 during the Reformation, replacing the old medieval altar stone. The medieval stone was removed to the churchyard, but it was brought back inside in 1895 and placed on top of the 16th-century table.

The church continues to hold regular services and serves as a place of worship for the local community. There is a public footpath between Metton and Alby.

== Churchyard ==
Notable burials in the churchyard include Lieutenant Colonel Joseph Francis Barclay OBE, who served in Gallipoli and France in the First World War.

== See also ==
- Hanworth, Norfolk
- Hanworth Hall
