= Hickling Mill =

Windmill in Hickling, Norfolk, England

Hickling Windmill
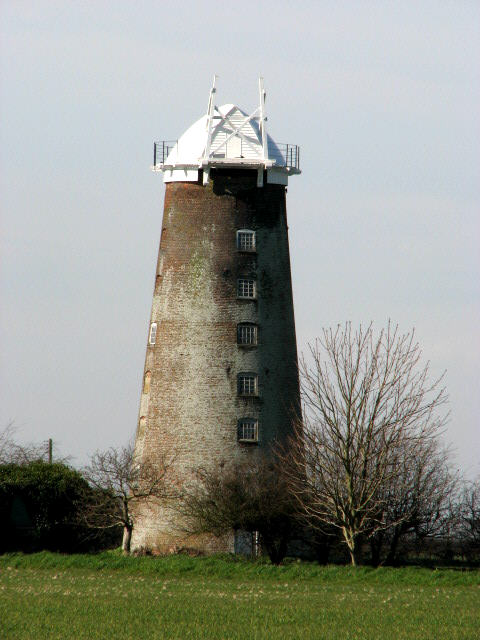
- Hickling Mill
- Interactive map of Hickling Windmill

Origin
- Mill location: TG 4086 2300
- Coordinates: 52°45′3″N 1°34′3″E
- Operator: Private
- Year built: 1818

Information
- Purpose: Corn mill
- Type: Tower mill
- Storeys: Eight storeys
- No. of sails: Four sails
- Winding: Fantail
- Fantail blades: Eight blades
- No. of pairs of millstones: Three pairs

Hickling Mill is a 19th-century grade II* listed windmill in Hickling Heath, Norfolk, England.

It was built of tarred brick in 1818 to a design known as a tower mill, a tapering circular building 8 storeys high with brickwork 30 inches (76 cm) thick at the base. Each floor has 4 windows to the four cardinal points of the compass although many are blocked up on the inside, especially on the north face. It is topped by a weatherboarded boat-shaped cap with a petticoat and fan cradle.

The mill was used for grinding wheat for flour and by the 1860s also included a bakery. Production ceased in 1904, at which time the sails and fantail were removed.

After several changes of ownership the mill in 1934 came into the ownership of the Forbes family, who carried out major cap renovation in 1989. Otherwise Hickling Mill is one of the few windmills in the country to have been preserved in a largely unrestored condition. It still contains almost a complete set of main machinery and many of the original timber fittings and three sets of millstones.

== Technical Details ==
The tower has a height of 60 feet (18 m) to the top of the brickwork and an overall height of 71 feet (22 m) to the ridge of the cap. The cap is a Norfolk boat shaped type which had an 8 bladed fan and a gallery. The sails consisted of four double shuttered sails, each with 9 bays, controlled by a 9 feet (2.7 m) diameter brake wheel. They powered 3 pairs of French burr stones, 2 flour mills, a cylinder and a jumper. 3 dressing machines and an oat crusher could also be driven.
