= St Olaves Windpump =

Windmill in Fritton, Norfolk, England

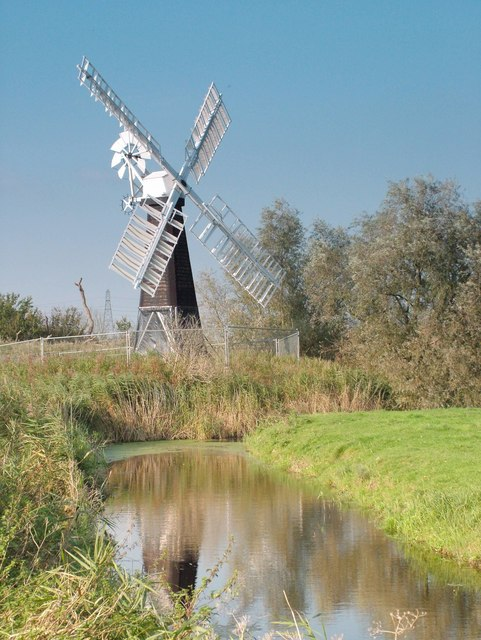
- St Olaves Windpump, October 2005
- Interactive map of St Olaves Windpump

Origin
- Mill name: St Olaves Windpump, Priory Mill
- Mill location: Fritton, Norfolk, United Kingdom
- Grid reference: TM 4568 9971
- Coordinates: 52°32′21″N 1°37′23″E
- Operator: Norfolk Windmills Trust
- Year built: 1910

Information
- Purpose: Drainage mill
- Type: Trestle mill
- Smock sides: Four
- No. of sails: Four
- Type of sails: Patent sails
- Windshaft: Cast iron
- Winding: Fantail
- Fantail blades: Eight
- Type of pump: Scoopwheel

St Olaves Windpump, or Priory Mill is a Grade II* listed trestle mill at Fritton, Norfolk, United Kingdom. It was built in 1910 and has been preserved by the Norfolk Windmills Trust.

== History ==
St Olaves Windpump was built in 1910 by Daniel England, millwright of Ludham, Norfolk. As built, the trestle was open. It was boarded in 1928. The mill worked until 1957, when it was replaced by an electric punp. The mill stood in Suffolk until St Olaves was transferred to Norfolk under the 1974 boundary changes. Arthur C. Smith surveyed the mill on 5 May 1975. He noted that the mill was under restoration, but was missing its sails and fantail. Restoration was completed in 1980. Smith surveyed the mill again on 29 June 1988 and 19 May 1989. He noted that the mill had its sails, without shutters, and fantail. It was then in the ownership of the Norfolk Windmills Trust. The mill was listed Grade II* on 15 July 1988. On 18 January 2007, the mill was tailwinded and the cap was dislodged. It was subsequently repaired.

== Description ==
St Olaves Windpump is a four-sided trestle mill. It has a boat shape cap winded by an eight-bladed fantail. Four Patent sails are carried in a cast iron windshaft. The sails have six bays. The innermost and outermost bays have two shutters, the others have three. The mill drives a scoopwheel. All machinery is cast iron except the wooden upright shaft.
