= Grade II* listed buildings in Broadland =

There are over 20,000 Grade II* listed buildings in England. This page is a list of these buildings in the district of Broadland in Norfolk.

== List of buildings ==
Name	Location	Type	Completed (Note: The date given is the date used by Historic England as significant for the initial building or that of an important part in the structure's description.)	Date designated	Grid ref. (Note: The grid reference is based on the British national grid reference system, sometimes known as OSGB36, used by the Ordnance Survey.) Geo-coordinates	Entry number (Note: The "List Entry Number" is a unique number assigned to each listed building and scheduled monument by Historic England.)	Image
Church of St John the Baptist	Alderford	Church	14th century	10 May 1961	TG1237618783; 52°43′30″N 1°08′37″E	1076888	Church of St John the Baptist More images
Church of St Andrew	Attlebridge	Parish church	c.1300	10 May 1961	TG1294416861; 52°42′27″N 1°09′02″E	1372661	Church of St Andrew More images
Knoll House	Aylsham	House	Early 18th century	19 January 1952	TG1915227026; 52°47′47″N 1°14′57″E	1051567	Upload Photo
Old Bank House	Aylsham	House	Early 18th century	10 May 1965	TG1936226831; 52°47′40″N 1°15′08″E	1051551	Upload Photo
The Manor House	Aylsham	House	17th century	19 January 1952	TG1942026751; 52°47′37″N 1°15′11″E	1372668	Upload Photo
Yew Tree House Including Boundary Wall	Aylsham	House	18th century	1 June 1984	TG1917627017; 52°47′46″N 1°14′58″E	1170402	Upload Photo
Church of St Andrew	Blickling	Parish church	Medieval	10 May 1961	TG1787328455; 52°48′35″N 1°13′52″E	1171857	Church of St Andrew More images
The Doric Temple	Blickling Park, Blickling	Garden temple	Early/mid-18th century	19 January 1952	TG1823628530; 52°48′36″N 1°14′12″E	1051432	The Doric Temple More images
The Mausoleum	Blickling Park, Blickling	Mausoleum	1793	19 January 1952	TG1662529463; 52°49′09″N 1°12′48″E	1051437	The Mausoleum More images
Church of St Michael and All Angels	Booton	Church	14th century	10 May 1961	TG1229822386; 52°45′26″N 1°08′41″E	1342776	Church of St Michael and All Angels More images
Church of St Michael	Oxnead, Brampton	Parish church	13th century	10 May 1961	TG2297424051; 52°46′05″N 1°18′14″E	1050959	Church of St Michael More images
Church of St Peter	Brampton	Parish church	12th century	10 May 1961	TG2197324610; 52°46′24″N 1°17′22″E	1372950	Church of St Peter More images
Oxnead Hall	Oxnead, Brampton	Country house	Late 16th century	10 May 1961	TG2307224012; 52°46′03″N 1°18′19″E	1372951	Oxnead Hall More images
Church of St Nicholas	Brandiston	Church	14th century	10 May 1961	TG1413221423; 52°44′53″N 1°10′16″E	1076897	Church of St Nicholas More images
Church of St Lawrence	Brundall	Parish church	13th century	25 September 1962	TG3216108452; 52°37′27″N 1°25′43″E	1051519	Church of St Lawrence More images
Burgh Mill	Burgh and Tuttington	Watermill	Late 18th century	18 November 1983	TG2221525093; 52°46′40″N 1°17′36″E	1250712	Burgh Mill More images
Church of St Peter and Paul	Tuttington, Burgh and Tuttington	Parish church	12th century	10 May 1961	TG2265527187; 52°47′47″N 1°18′04″E	1050931	Church of St Peter and Paul More images
Church of St Andrew	Buxton, Buxton with Lammas	Parish church	14th century	10 May 1961	TG2335122704; 52°45′21″N 1°18′30″E	1249960	Church of St Andrew More images
Church of St Andrew	Lammas, Buxton with Lammas	Parish church	15th century	10 May 1961	TG2452823217; 52°45′36″N 1°19′34″E	1372945	Church of St Andrew More images
Little Hautbois Hall	Little Hautbois, Buxton with Lammas	Country house	Late 16th century	19 January 1952	TG2488221942; 52°44′54″N 1°19′50″E	1050941	Little Hautbois Hall More images
Church of St Botolph	Limpenhoe, Cantley, Limpenhoe and Southwood	Parish church	15th century	25 September 1962	TG3953003992; 52°34′51″N 1°32′03″E	1051451	Church of St Botolph More images
Church of St Margaret	Cantley	Parish church	1250	25 September 1962	TG3816704140; 52°34′58″N 1°30′51″E	1304803	Church of St Margaret More images
Remains of Church of St Edmunds	Southwood, Cantley, Limpenhoe and Southwood	Parish church	14th century	25 September 1962	TG3911205316; 52°35′35″N 1°31′44″E	1372698	Remains of Church of St Edmunds More images
Bank Cottage and Oak House	Cawston	House	c.1700	10 May 1961	TG1351623897; 52°46′14″N 1°09′49″E	1050949	Upload Photo
Church of St Theobald	Great Hautbois, Coltishall	Church	15th century	10 May 1961	TG2617820431; 52°44′03″N 1°20′55″E	1295280	Church of St Theobald More images
The Limes and attached garden walls	Coltishall	House	1692	19 January 1952	TG2759919831; 52°43′42″N 1°22′09″E	1295241	Upload Photo
The Old House	Coltishall	House	1727	10 May 1961	TG2694219745; 52°43′40″N 1°21′34″E	1372990	Upload Photo
Drayton Lodge	Drayton	Summerhouse	15th century	19 January 1952	TG1864313154; 52°40′19″N 1°13′57″E	1306023	Drayton Lodge More images
Parish Church of St Margaret	Drayton	Parish church	15th century	19 January 1952	TG1804413741; 52°40′39″N 1°13′26″E	1306000	Parish Church of St Margaret More images
Parish Church of St Margaret	Felthorpe	Parish church	14th century	10 May 1961	TG1698017318; 52°42′36″N 1°12′38″E	1051539	Parish Church of St Margaret More images
Old Hall Farm House	Foulsham	Farmhouse	16th century	19 January 1952	TG0345724907; 52°47′00″N 1°00′56″E	1372926	Upload Photo
Table tomb to the north-east of the west door of the Church of the Holy Innocents	Foulsham	Table tomb	c.1505	3 May 1983	TG0325025068; 52°47′06″N 1°00′45″E	1050985	Table tomb to the north-east of the west door of the Church of the Holy Innocents More images
Church of All Saints	Freethorpe	Parish church	Tower probably Norman	25 September 1962	TG4086705507; 52°35′38″N 1°33′18″E	1051456	Church of All Saints More images
Stock house 47 metres south of the Manor House	Freethorpe	Animal shed	1828	20 February 1952	TG4114704986; 52°35′21″N 1°33′31″E	1152503	Upload Photo
Church of St Swithin	Frettenham	Parish church	14th century	10 May 1961	TG2448518529; 52°43′04″N 1°19′20″E	1372955	Church of St Swithin More images
Church of St Gervase and Protase	Little Plumstead, Great and Little Plumstead	Parish church	13th century and later	25 September 1962	TG3074110859; 52°38′47″N 1°24′34″E	1051528	Church of St Gervase and Protase More images
The Grange, garden walls, attached greenhouse and outbuildings	Little Plumstead, Great and Little Plumstead	House	16th century	19 March 1985	TG3146610938; 52°38′48″N 1°25′13″E	1372657	Upload Photo
Great Witchingham Hall	Great Witchingham	Country house	Late 16th–early 17th century	19 January 1952	TG1118618603; 52°43′26″N 1°07′33″E	1076861	Great Witchingham Hall More images
Manor House	Great Witchingham	Farmhouse	17th century	19 January 1952	TG1029721416; 52°44′58″N 1°06′52″E	1306691	Manor House
Congregational Chapel	Guestwick	Chapel/timber framed house	1625	2 November 1972	TG0606527228; 52°48′12″N 1°03′20″E	1372914	Congregational Chapel More images
Mutton's Mill	Halvergate Marshes, Halvergate	Drainage mill	Mid-19th century	26 February 1987	TG4412506349; 52°36′00″N 1°36′13″E	1051457	Mutton's Mill More images
Remains of Church of St Peter and St Paul	Tunstall, Halvergate	Parish church	13th century and later	25 September 1962	TG4170508021; 52°36′58″N 1°34′09″E	1372727	Remains of Church of St Peter and St Paul More images
Stracey Arms Windpump	Tunstall, Halvergate	Drainage mill	1883	7 December 1962	TG4416408969; 52°37′25″N 1°36′22″E	1051459	Stracey Arms Windpump More images
Parish Church of St Peter	Haveringland	Parish church	11th century tower	10 May 1961	TG1514920902; 52°44′34″N 1°11′09″E	1372948	Parish Church of St Peter More images
Parish Church of St Mary	Hellesdon	Parish church	15th century	10 May 1961	TG2005310614; 52°38′55″N 1°15′06″E	1170678	Parish Church of St Mary More images
Cropton Hall	Heydon	Farmhouse	17th century	19 January 1952	TG1079428374; 52°48′42″N 1°07′35″E	1305357	Cropton Hall
Church of St Andrew	Honingham	Parish church	14th century	10 May 1961	TG1141711245; 52°39′28″N 1°07′28″E	1170701	Church of St Andrew More images
Parish Church of All Saints	Horsford	Parish church	1456	10 May 1961	TG1968415379; 52°41′29″N 1°14′57″E	1170781	Parish Church of All Saints More images
Mayton Old Bridge	Horstead with Stanninghall	Bridge	Early 16th century	10 May 1961	TG2499621561; 52°44′41″N 1°19′55″E	1178140	Mayton Old Bridge More images
Parish Church of All Saints	Horstead with Stanninghall	Parish church	Early 14th century	10 May 1961	TG2628519915; 52°43′46″N 1°21′00″E	1178235	Parish Church of All Saints More images
Old Hall Farmhouse	South Burlingham, Lingwood and Burlingham	Farmhouse	Late 16th century	20 February 1952	TG3726007832; 52°36′59″N 1°30′12″E	1152874	Old Hall Farmhouse More images
Church of St Faith	Little Witchingham	Church	14th century	22 July 1983	TG1154920233; 52°44′18″N 1°07′56″E	1342803	Church of St Faith More images
Church of St Margaret	Morton on the Hill	Parish church	13th century	10 May 1961	TG1249415828; 52°41′54″N 1°08′36″E	1051548	Church of St Margaret More images
Parish Church of St Margaret	Old Catton	Parish church	12th century	10 May 1961	TG2306012324; 52°39′46″N 1°17′49″E	1152550	Parish Church of St Margaret More images
The Firs	Old Catton	House	c.1750	19 January 1952	TG2335711812; 52°39′29″N 1°18′04″E	1372964	The Firs
Church of St Peter and St Paul	Oulton	Parish church	15th century	10 May 1961	TG1365428460; 52°48′41″N 1°10′07″E	1372723	Church of St Peter and St Paul More images
Congregational Chapel	Oulton	Nonconformist chapel	1728	14 February 1978	TG1409129210; 52°49′04″N 1°10′32″E	1172066	Congregational Chapel More images
Church of All Saints	Postwick, Postwick with Witton	Parish church	Medieval	20 May 1952	TG2961307826; 52°37′11″N 1°23′26″E	1372681	Church of All Saints More images
Church of St Margaret	Witton, Postwick with Witton	Parish church	Medieval	20 May 1952	TG3142309713; 52°38′09″N 1°25′07″E	1153110	Church of St Margaret More images
Polkey's Mill, 75 metres north-east of Seven Mile House	Reedham	Drainage mill	Mid-19th century	26 February 1987	TG4442803494; 52°34′27″N 1°36′21″E	1051425	Polkey's Mill, 75 metres north-east of Seven Mile House More images
Church of St Michael and All Angels	Reepham	Church	14th century	10 May 1961	TG1010822856; 52°45′45″N 1°06′45″E	1306488	Church of St Michael and All Angels More images
Old Hall	Kerdiston, Reepham	Manor house	Early 17th century	22 July 1983	TG0874824144; 52°46′28″N 1°05′36″E	1169735	Old Hall More images
Manor House	Salle	House	Early 17th century	19 January 1952	TG1168325250; 52°47′00″N 1°08′15″E	1076855	Manor House More images
Moor Hall	Salle Moor, Salle	House	Late 17th century	19 January 1952	TG0992424605; 52°46′41″N 1°06′40″E	1342799	Moor Hall More images
Salle Park	Salle	Country house	1761	19 January 1952	TG1161824556; 52°46′38″N 1°08′10″E	1170353	Salle Park More images
Church of St Lawrence	South Walsham	Parish church	Medieval	25 September 1962	TG3658213270; 52°39′56″N 1°29′50″E	1051496	Church of St Lawrence More images
Church of St Mary	Hassingham, Strumpshaw	Parish church	12th century	25 September 1962	TG3690405514; 52°35′45″N 1°29′47″E	1303861	Church of St Mary More images
Swannington Hall	Swannington	House	16th century	19 January 1952	TG1382919302; 52°43′45″N 1°09′55″E	1263205	Upload Photo
Church of St Andrew	Themelthorpe	Parish church	13th century	10 May 1961	TG0575724090; 52°46′31″N 1°02′56″E	1170136	Church of St Andrew More images
Garden house 40m south of Walpole House	Thorpe St. Andrew	Gazebo	Mid-18th century	20 February 1952	TG2566008388; 52°37′35″N 1°19′58″E	1372706	Upload Photo
Ruin of Church of St Andrew	Thorpe St. Andrew	Parish church	15th century	25 September 1962	TG2606308411; 52°37′35″N 1°20′19″E	1051503	Ruin of Church of St Andrew More images
Thorpe Hall	Thorpe St. Andrew	Bishops palace	Earlier	20 February 1952	TG2554008396; 52°37′35″N 1°19′52″E	1154440	Upload Photo
Walpole House	Thorpe St. Andrew	House	17th century	20 February 1952	TG2565008431; 52°37′36″N 1°19′58″E	1051508	Upload Photo
Church of St Mary	Fishley, Upton with Fishley	Parish church	12th century	25 September 1962	TG3988011491; 52°38′53″N 1°32′41″E	1051427	Church of St Mary More images
Wood Dalling Hall	Wood Dalling	Country house	Late 16th century	19 January 1952	TG0742927026; 52°48′03″N 1°04′32″E	1305293	Upload Photo
Church of St Fabian and St Sebastian	Woodbastwick	Parish church	Medieval	25 September 1962	TG3324915226; 52°41′04″N 1°26′58″E	1154614	Church of St Fabian and St Sebastian More images
Porch attached to east by garden walls to Ranworth Old Hall	Ranworth, Woodbastwick	Manor house	Early 16th century	20 February 1952	TG3449515402; 52°41′08″N 1°28′05″E	1051473	Porch attached to east by garden walls to Ranworth Old Hall
Ruined Church of All Saints	Panxworth, Woodbastwick	Church	14th century	25 September 1962	TG3474413567; 52°40′08″N 1°28′13″E	1372709	Ruined Church of All Saints More images

== Formerly listed buildings ==
Name	Location	Type	Completed	Date designated	Grid ref. Geo-coordinates	Entry number	Image
Ranworth Old Hall	Ranworth, Woodbastwick	House (demolished 1985)	Earlier	20 February 1952	TG3446315393; 52°41′08″N 1°28′03″E		Ranworth Old Hall More images

== See also ==
- Grade I listed buildings in Broadland
- Grade II* listed buildings in Norfolk
  - Grade II* listed buildings in Breckland
  - Grade II* listed buildings in Great Yarmouth
  - Grade II* listed buildings in King's Lynn and West Norfolk
  - Grade II* listed buildings in North Norfolk
  - Grade II* listed buildings in Norwich
  - Grade II* listed buildings in South Norfolk
