= William Lubbock =

William Lubbock (baptised 17 January 1701 – 20 April 1754) was an English divine, Fellow of Caius College, Cambridge, and Church of England clergyman. He founded the English family of Lubbock.

== Education ==
The son of John Lubbock (1669–1731), a clothier of North Walsham, Norfolk, and of his wife Elizabeth Webster, Lubbock was educated at Gresham's School, Holt, from 1712 and later at Gonville and Caius College, Cambridge.

== Career ==
Lubbock graduated as a BA in 1721 and as an MA in 1724, and as a Bachelor of Divinity in 1732. He remained at Caius as a tutor in Classics and Divinity and was a Fellow of the college between 1724 and 1733.

From 1732 to 1738, Lubbock was Rector of Bincombe and of Broadwey, both in Dorset. Resigning these livings, he purchased the Rectory of Lamas on 22 December 1738, and gained also the Vicarage of Stalham in 1739 and the Rectory of Scottow on 1 October 1741. He held all three livings until his death in 1754.

== Family ==
William Lubbock married Elizabeth Cooper on 26 October 1742 at Paston, Norfolk, England. They had two sons, John Lubbock (20 August 1744 – 24 February 1816), and another William Lubbock (6 July 1746 – 23 June 1823). The Rev. William Lubbock died on 20 April 1754 and was buried on 23 April 1754 in the churchyard of his home town, North Walsham.

Lubbock's elder son, John, was created a baronet, and his great-great-grandson, Sir John Lubbock, 4th baronet, was created Baron Avebury. His descendants include Sir John Lubbock, 1st Baronet, Sir John William Lubbock, 2nd Baronet, Sir John William Lubbock, 3rd Baronet, John Lubbock, 4th Baronet and 1st Baron Avebury, John Lubbock, 2nd Baron Avebury, John Lubbock, 3rd Baron Avebury, and Eric Lubbock, 4th Baron Avebury.

== Sources ==
- Lubbock at Rootsweb.com
