= Bure Valley Path =

Walking and cycling trail in Norfolk, England

Coordinates: 52.7582°N 1.3056°E

The Bure Valley Path is a 9-mile (14 km) long walking trail and cycling trail in Norfolk, England. It runs alongside the Bure Valley Railway, a heritage railway from Wroxham to Aylsham.

== Route ==
The path passes through and close to following towns and villages.

- Aylsham
- Brampton
- Buxton
- Lamas
- Little Hautbois
- Great Hautbois
- Coltishall
- Hoveton
- Wroxham
