= John Lubbock =

John Lubbock is the name of:

- Sir John Lubbock, 1st Baronet (1744–1816)
- Sir John Lubbock, 2nd Baronet (1774–1840), English banker
- Sir John Lubbock, 3rd Baronet (1803–1865), English banker, barrister, mathematician and astronomer
- John Lubbock, 1st Baron Avebury (1834–1913), English banker, politician, naturalist and archaeologist
- John Lubbock, 2nd Baron Avebury (1858–1929), English aristocrat and banker
- John Lubbock, 3rd Baron Avebury (1915–1971), English peer
- John Lubbock (conductor) (active from 1967), founder and conductor of the Orchestra of St John's, Smith Square
