= Buxton Watermill =

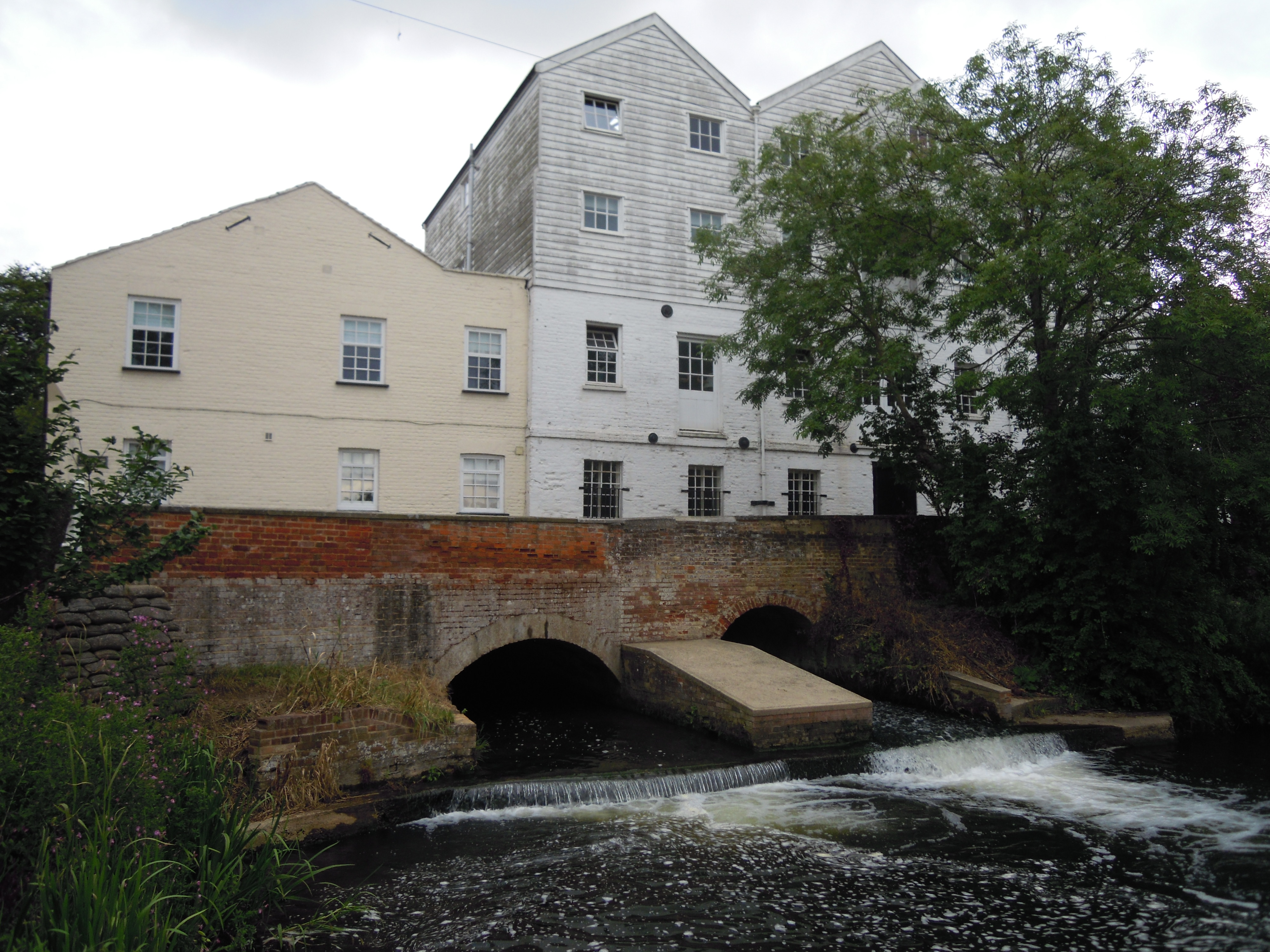
- Buxton Watermill elevation.

- Location within Norfolk

General information
- Type: Watermill
- Location: River Bure, Buxton with Lammas, England
- Coordinates: 52.757125°N 1.315000°E
- Owner: Private

Buxton Mill is located on the River Bure, approximately 0.5 miles (0.80 km) east of the village of Buxton, Norfolk, within the hamlet of Lamas, Norfolk.

A watermill at this site is recorded in the Domesday Book. The present structure is believed to date from 1754 and was constructed by William Pepper, a merchant from Buxton.

== Description ==
The present mill is built over four storeys and is brick built with weatherboard cladding. The east elevation has three bays with gables. There is a timber lucam (covered sack hoist) of shiplap construction on the top floor of the middle bay which oversails the road below.

=== Power ===
At Buxton the river Bure was quite large with a powerful flow and with the diversion of the course there was a fall of 6 to 7 feet providing this mill with considerable power. The breastshot water wheel, which was sixteen foot, was installed in a separate brick built building which was located behind the mill house. This water wheel was replaced by a turbine in 1902. There was also a second waterwheel which was overshot using water that formed part of the Aylsham Navigation and gained its head by the close by lock system. The 1902 turbine was small and revolved at a much faster pace which removed the need several of the gear wheels which on larger, slow moving water wheels waste considerable power out-put. In 1965 this turbine was still producing 25% of the mill's power requirements. It had undergone a minor overhaul in 1930 and a major overhaul in the 1960s that would have left it capable of running for the next 40 years. The mills power was used to drive two and sometimes three pairs of millstones, which were in regular use for grinding animal food stuffs. Flour for household use was also produced and biscuit flour was milled using electrically powered roller milling machines.

=== The Mill House ===
To the north side of the watermill stands the Mill House which was built in the Georgian period and has a fine ironwork porch. The rear section of the Mill House is thought to have been added soon after construction in the late 18th century, and is a former granary with corner posts, dragon beams and dragon braces.

The mill was reconstructed after a devastating fire in January 1991, though it re-opened a year later after major reconstruction. In 2005, the mill was converted to apartments.
