= Baron Avebury =

Barony in the Peerage of the United Kingdom

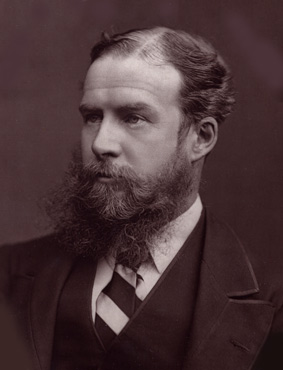
John Lubbock, 1st Baron Avebury.

Baron Avebury, of Avebury in the County of Wiltshire, is a title in the Peerage of the United Kingdom. It was created 22 January 1900 for the banker, politician and archaeologist Sir John Lubbock, 4th Baronet. He was succeeded by his eldest son, the second Baron. On his death the titles passed to his nephew, the third Baron. He was the son of Harold Fox Pitt Lubbock, fourth son of the first Baron, who died in 1971.

The title then passed to the third Baron's first cousin, the fourth Baron, the son of Maurice Fox Pitt Lubbock, sixth son of the first Baron. The fourth baron was a Liberal Democrat politician and one of the ninety excepted hereditary peers who remained in the House of Lords after the passing of the House of Lords Act 1999. He was succeeded by his son, the fifth Baron, in 2016.

The Lubbock baronetcy, of Lamas, was created in the Baronetage of the United Kingdom on 9 April 1806 for John Lubbock, with remainder to his nephew John William, the son of William Lubbock. Lubbock was a successful merchant and banker in London. He was succeeded according to the special remainder by his nephew William, who became the second Baronet. He was also a banker. His grandson, the aforementioned fourth Baronet, was elevated to the peerage as Baron Avebury in 1900.

== Lubbock baronets, of Lamas (1806) ==
Escutcheon of the Lubbock baronets of Lamas, and barons Avebury

- Sir John Lubbock, 1st Baronet (1744–1816)
- Sir John William Lubbock, 2nd Baronet (1773–1840)
- Sir John William Lubbock, 3rd Baronet (1803–1865)
- Sir John Lubbock, 4th Baronet (1834–1913) (created Baron Avebury in 1900)

=== Baron Avebury (1900) ===
- John Lubbock, 1st Baron Avebury (1834–1913)
- John Birkbeck Lubbock, 2nd Baron Avebury (1858–1929)
- John Lubbock, 3rd Baron Avebury (1915–1971)
- Eric Reginald Lubbock, 4th Baron Avebury (1928–2016)
- Lyulph Ambrose Jonathan Lubbock, 5th Baron Avebury (born 1954)

The heir apparent is his only son, the Hon. Alexander Lyulph Robert Lubbock (born 1985).

=== Title succession chart ===
Title succession chart, Lubbock baronets and Barons Avebury

Rev. William Lubbock; 1701–1754
Sir John Lubbock; 1st Baronet; 1744–1816	William Lubbock; 1746–1823
Sir John Lubbock; 2nd Baronet; 1773–1840
Sir John Lubbock; 3rd Baronet; 1803–1865
Baron Avebury
John Lubbock; 1st Baron Avebury; 4th Baronet; 1834–1913
John Lubbock; 2nd Baron Avebury; 1858–1929	Hon. Norman Lubbock; 1861–1926	Hon. Rolfe Lubbock; 1865–1909	Hon. Harold Lubbock; 1888–1918	Capt. Hon. Eric Lubbock; 1893–1917	Hon. Maurice Lubbock; 1900–1957
John Lubbock; 3rd Baron Avebury; 1915–1971	Eric Lubbock; 4th Baron Avebury; 1928–2016
Lyulph Lubbock; 5th Baron Avebury born 1954
Hon. Alexander Lubbock born 1985

== Notes ==
Baronetage of the United Kingdom
Preceded by Louis baronets	Lubbock baronets of Lamas; 9 April 1806	Followed by Scott baronets
