= Guton =

Former settlement in Norfolk, England

Coordinates: 52.743°N 1.158°E

Guton was a settlement in the county of Norfolk in England mentioned in the Domesday Book as Guthetuna. It is described as being held by Osbert from Tihel le Breton. It had a mill and 14 beehives. It was considered a small town with 40 households (which at the time of the survey was a large settlement). Lestan, a freeman, was deprived of it on the Norman conquest.

In the 13th century the family of Peche had an interest in this town, and Sir Andrew de Helion, of Bumpstead, in Essex, certified the venerable barons of the Exchequer, on the marriage of the King's sister, to the Emperour Germany, about 1234, that Symon Peche held 3 parts of a fee of him in Gukenton Norfolk.

Guton was granted a charter from the Crown licensing the holding of a market in 1287, though by the 17th century the market was out of use.

The site of the settlement is marked by Guton Hall in the modern civil parish of Brandiston.

The village of Brandiston is not mentioned in the Domesday Book, but gradually eclipsed Guton; both settlements are mentioned with equal billing in The History of Norfolk, edited by John Chambers 1829, as follows: "Brandiston and Guton. Nine miles from Norwich. Church St. Nicholas. Was held by the families of Fastolf and Paston." However, in White's more detailed History, Gazetteer and Directory of Norfolk published in 1845, the parish is still referred to as Brandiston and Guton but the main heading had become Brandiston.
