= Little Hautbois =

Hamlet in Norfolk, England

Coordinates: 52.7469°N 1.3358°E

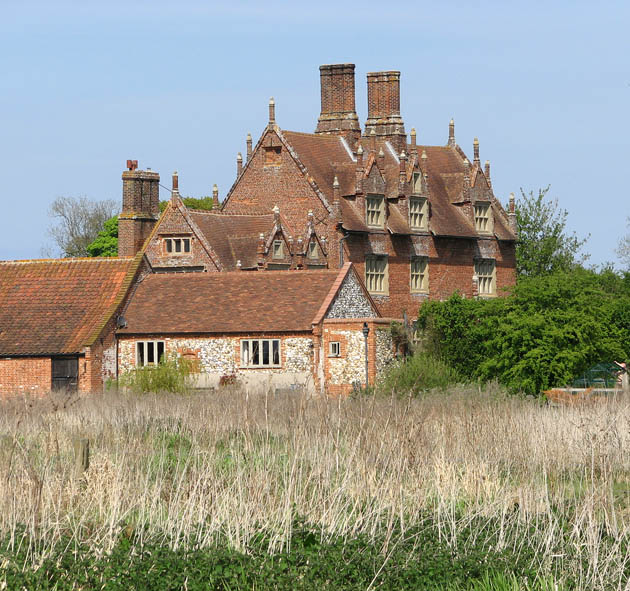
- Little Hautbois Hall

- Location within Norfolk
- Civil parish: Buxton with Lamas
- District: Broadland
- Shire county: Norfolk
- Region: East
- Country: England
- Sovereign state: United Kingdom
- Post town: NORWICH
- Postcode district: NR10
- Dialling code: 01603
- UK Parliament: Broadland and Fakenham

Little Hautbois is a small hamlet in the parish of Lamas, in Norfolk, England. Its population is included in the civil parish of nearby Buxton with Lamas, which was 1,642 at the 2021 census.

== Toponymy ==
The name is pronounced "Hobbis", historically spelt phonetically as Magna Hobbis; it can be seen thus spelled on a memorial on the outside of nearby Lamas Church.

== History ==
In the Middle Ages, the settlement of Great Hautbois was the head of the navigation on the river Bure, from which it is thought Little Hautbois developed. The name, which can be translated to High Woods in English, is taken from that of the de Alto Bosco, or de Haut Bois, family, who acquired these lands at the Norman Conquest. (Note: Alternatively, they may have taken the name from the settlement, Blomefield was uncertain on this point.)

== Geography ==
As of 2007, Little Hautbois consisted of eight dwelling-houses, one a holiday cottage rented out by the owner. The church of Little Hautbois, once owned by the monks of St Benet's Abbey, fell into ruin in the 15th century when the parish was amalgamated with that of Lamas. (Note: Information displayed at St Andrew's, Lamas.) Although ruins were still visible in the 18th century, no sign of the building now remains above ground; the only trace of its existence is a depression in the grounds of Hautbois Hall.

Two former main transport routes pass through the hamlet:

- River Bure, canalised in the 18th century to allow navigation up to Aylsham
- Bure Valley Railway, formerly a railway line on the national network and now a heritage light steam railway.

== St. Mary's Church ==
This was a building of some importance, dedicated to the Virgin Mary. Metal detector work on the site, which lay between the Hall and the road, has uncovered, among other things, a Papal seal. Some have identified this as the site of a chapel and hospital for travellers, founded by the de Alto Bosco family, who held the parishes of Great and Little Hautbois at the time of the Domesday Book, although this hospital may have stood a little further up the river, at Great Hautbois, and confusion arisen because of the dedication of both churches to the Virgin Mary. Foundations were visible in 1907. (Note: A list of vicars of Little Hautbois displayed at St Andrew's Church, Lamas.)

== Notable buildings ==
=== Hautbois Hall ===
Hautbois Hall is a private residence set in 36-acre (15 ha) grounds, beside the river Bure. It was built in the reign of King Edward VI in 1555 and remains a splendid example of a Tudor manor house with pretensions. Probably erected on the site of an existing manor house, the house contains a medieval staircase. Three storeys in height and four bays in length, it is only one room deep. The two-storey kitchen block, while almost identical in style to the main black, is 17th century in date. Tall chimneys and finials on gables and dormer windows increase the building's height, while stone mullioned windows and diapered brickwork add to the building's impressive appearance.

It is thought that the family of the original builder went bankrupt about a century after its building and the buildings passed into the ownership of a charity connected with the church of St Peter Parmentergate, Norwich. A painting dated 1840 shows large extensions, removed in a late-19th-century restoration.

The hall has been painstakingly restored and it retains many of its original Tudor features.

=== Adam and Eve pub ===
Little Hautbois had a public house, the Adam and Eve, until it was closed in 1969. During the World War II, it was a popular drinking place for personnel of the nearby RAF Coltishall airfield. Today, the building is a private house, but the house's past is preserved in its name of Adam and Eve House. The remains of a pub sign-board are visible beside the front gate of the house's large gravel forecourt. It has a fine three-bay frontage, the upper floor being lit by three dormer windows. The brick is diapered in a simple chequerboard pattern.

Adam and Eve House was built in the 18th century as a farmhouse, extended by the addition of a lower, two-storey wing in the 19th century. 20th-century alterations included the addition of a garage and the rearrangement of windows in the lower block. It was originally thatched, as was the barn (Note: Now converted into a house called Eden Cottage.) beside it. The roof of the house was replaced with pantiles in the 20th century after a fire seriously damaged the barn.

=== Bridge Farmhouse ===
Bridge Farmhouse, by the railway bridge, displays simple diapering on the wall that faces the road, but is otherwise unremarkable, having been much altered and now subdivided to form two dwellings. Foxwood, formerly the White House, has a Georgian front built onto a house with older origins.

The present bridge over the river Bure is built over the remains of an older bridge that lifted up to allow wherries to pass underneath. (Note: A picture of this may be seen at the Norfolk Record Office.) The old bridge, built around the 15th century, is of two arches and built of brick. It incorporates two strange arched niche-like structures that have been variously interpreted as shelters for travellers caught in the rain and as lurking-places for excise-men. Percy Millican, in his history of Horstead and Stanninghall, links these with a similar arch not far from the bridge there, which is of similar date; he described the bridge as "standing high and dry, although water flows under both of these arches today."

=== St Theobald's Church ===
St Theobald's Church, Great Hautbois, was a round tower church from the 11th century; it was ruinated in around 1860 and is now a listed building.
