= Sir John Lubbock, 1st Baronet =

English aristocrat, merchant, banker, politician

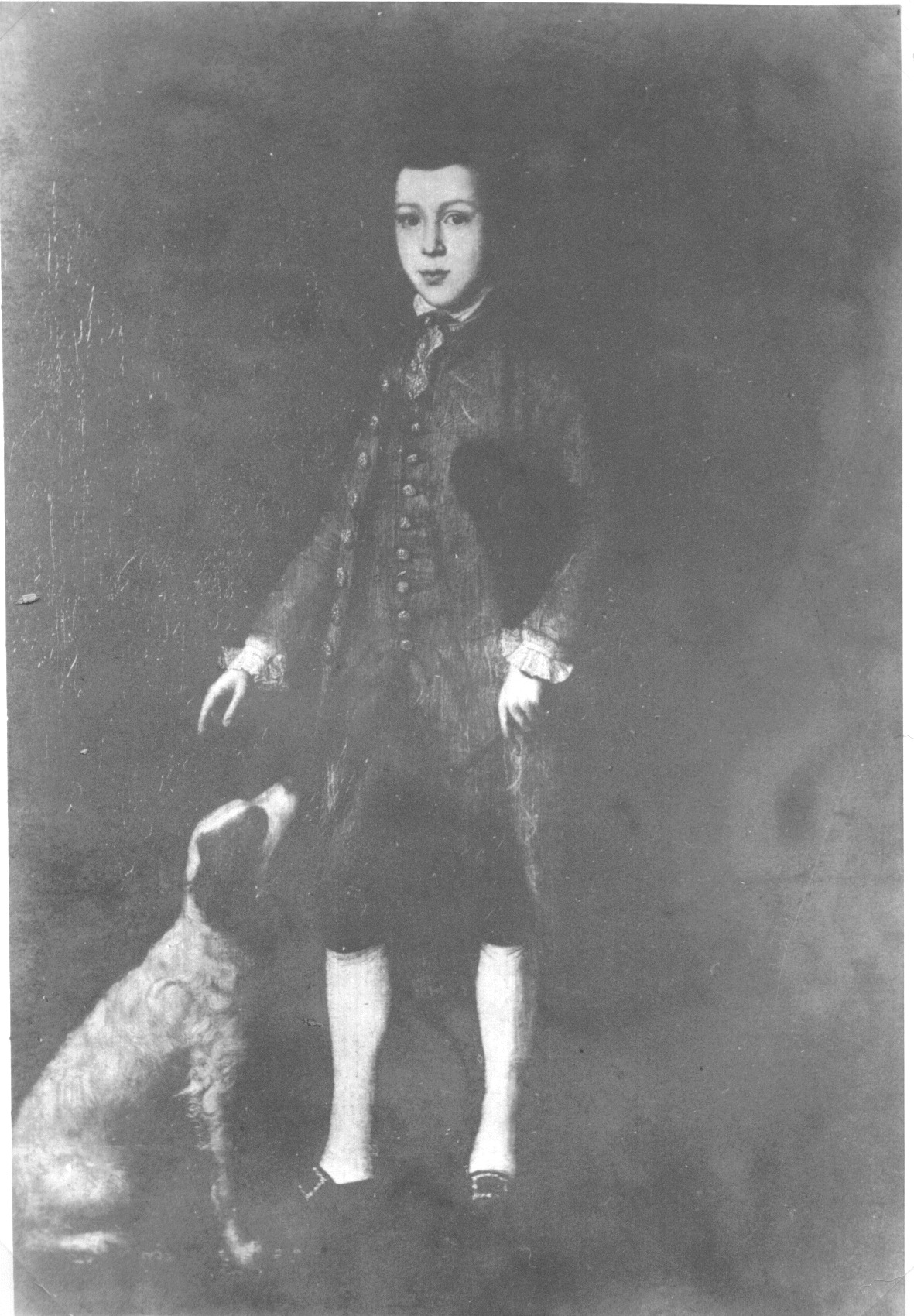
John Lubbock, 1st Baronet, as a young man with his dog

Sir John Lubbock, 1st Baronet (bapt 20 August 1744 – 24 February 1816), was an English banker. Lubbock was also a merchant and Member of Parliament. He was the first son of a Cambridge don, the Reverend William Lubbock of Lamas, Norfolk, by Elizabeth, daughter of Thomas Cooper of North Walsham, Norfolk. He married Elizabeth Christiana Commerell, daughter of his business partner, Frederick Commerell of Hanwell, Middlesex, and his wife Catherine Elton on 12 October 1771 at St Dunstan's in the East, London. They had no children. In 1806 he was created a baronet, of Lamas, with remainder to his nephew John William Lubbock, who succeeded him as second baronet.

== Career ==
=== Business ===
He was sent to London to learn business in the house of Commerell in Bishopsgate Street, London, of which he became a partner after his marriage. John adopted his nephew, John William Lubbock, and had him educated at Charterhouse. After, he taught John William about his business.

In 1772, Lubbock became a partner in the London bank of Lemon, Buller, Finlay and Lubbock of 15 Abchurch Lane and later Mansion House Street. In 1785, the partnership changed to Forster, Lubbock and Bosanquet and in 1801 to Forster, Lubbock, Forster and Clarke. Finally, in 1814, it was Sir John Lubbock, Lubbock & Co, the second partner being John William Lubbock, John's nephew and heir.

Shortly after establishing the Bank, Lubbock entered into business as a merchant with Frederick Commerell in 1776. The latter semi retired in 1787, choosing to stay on as a sleeping partner until 1796. John Lubbock then started up a second business with his nephew, John William Lubbock, Richard Tucker and Oliver Colt. The firm was called Lubbock, Colt and Co. It was involved in all sorts of ventures from importation of wines to overseas property acquisition. John Lubbock retired from this firm in 1812, handing over control to his nephew.

=== Political ===
In 1784, he intended to stand as parliamentary candidate for the Devizes constituency in Wiltshire but eventually declined the poll 'for the sake of peace'. In November 1795, he was one of the sponsors of the London merchants and bankers loyal declaration of support for Pitt's government. At the ensuing election in 1796, he was returned for Bossiney in Cornwall as a guest of Lord Mount Edgecumbe. In 1802, he appeared as a candidate for Leominster, Herefordshire, and secured his election with votes as follows

- John Lubbock 498
- Hon Charles Kinnaird 335
- Mr. Taylor 281

In 1794, the Directory of London & Westminster & Southwark shows him as a merchant in business with his partner F. Commerell at 2 St Mildred's Court, Poultry, in the City of London.

In 1806, he was re-elected without opposition. There he remained until his retirement in favour of his nephew in 1812.

== Baronetcy ==
In 1797, he insisted that the bank was fully competent to liquidate all the demands that could be brought against it, and recommended that £3,000,000 should be added to the capital, to enable the directors to discount to such an amount as would accommodate the commercial world. He was well disposed to the Greville ministry, which made him a baronet on 9 April 1806. John accepted this on the condition that he might pass it on to his nephew John William. This was granted and John William in gratitude chose the family motto to go with it "Auctor pretiosa facit" (the giver makes the gift precious). He was listed amongst the "staunch friends" of the abolition of the slave trade at around the same time. His nephew wrote of him "he was an excellent man of business and a genial, kind friend. He was fond of horses and hunting and used to drive 4 Greys into the City from his house in St James Place, which he had purchased in 1802 with Samuel Rogers the poet; Sir John taking two-thirds and Mr Rogers one-third.

== Residences ==
In addition to St James' Place, Sir John bought a large house on the west side of Clapham Common on 25 May 1787 from Isaac Akerman, and after a short period of residence there let it to W. G. Hamilton MP (known as "Single Speech" Hamilton). By then known as Battersea Rise, this house was sold in August 1792 to the abolitionist Henry Thornton, who for some years shared it with his cousin and political ally William Wilberforce. Lubbock's acquaintance with these gentlemen helps to explain his anti-slavery stance. Afterwards he rented Marble Hill Cottage near Richmond from a Miss Hotham, daughter of Sir Charles Hotham, Bart. (this being the first known link between those two families; the son of his heir and nephew was later to marry Harriet Hotham) from 1792. He then purchased it in 1807 and kept it as a residence until 1812. Other residences included Lamas in Norfolk (all his life), Honingham Hall in Norfolk (let from Hon Charles Townshend 1811 - his death), 13 Token House Yard in London (January 1765 – July 1768), Stratford Place (from June 1794) and a house in Gorleston, Norfolk, which he sold in March 1802.

In addition to the Bank premises mentioned above, he also part owned several general merchant houses including Broad Street, Walthamstow (1771–1774), St Mildred's Court, Poultry in the City of London (from 1783), a building in Oxford Street (from 1794) and 8 Bishopsgate Street (known to be occupied between 1778 and 1782).

== Portraits ==
Two portraits of John are known. The first is a full-length portrait of him as a young man aged about 18 (see above), which used to be at High Elms in Kent, the family home during the 19th and 20th centuries. The second is of a more rotund version of him in much later life seated in a chair. There is also a picture of his young wife dated 1774 by John Downman, which appeared for sale advertised in Country Life magazine. The portrait shown was lost when the family home at High Elms burned down in 1967. The portrait of the elderly man is held at Clapham Library.

== Death ==
He died on 24 February 1816 at 23 St James Place. He is buried at St James's Church, Piccadilly, where there were tablets to his memory, and that of his wife, in the belltower. There is no sign of them now and it is thought that the memorials may have been destroyed in the blitz. His wife outlived him by many years, moving to St Leonards in Sussex after her husband's death. She eventually died there in 1845 at the age of 94.

Parliament of Great Britain
Preceded by Evelyn Pierrepont; James Archibald Stuart	Member of Parliament for Bossiney; 1796–1800; With: John Stuart-Wortley 1796–1797; James Stuart-Wortley from 1797–1800	Succeeded by Parliament of the United Kingdom
Parliament of the United Kingdom
Preceded by Parliament of Great Britain	Member of Parliament for Bossiney; 1801–1802; With: James Stuart-Wortley	Succeeded by James Stuart-Wortley; John Hiley Addington
Preceded by William Taylor; George Augustus Pollen	Member of Parliament for Leominster; 1802–1812; With: Charles Kinnaird 1802 – January 1806; William Lamb January – November 1806; Henry Bonham November 1806–1812	Succeeded by John Lubbock; John Harcourt
Baronetage of the United Kingdom
New creation	Baronet of Lamas; 1806–1816	Succeeded by John Lubbock
