= Coltishall =

Village in Norfolk, England

Coordinates: 52.7281°N 1.36189°E

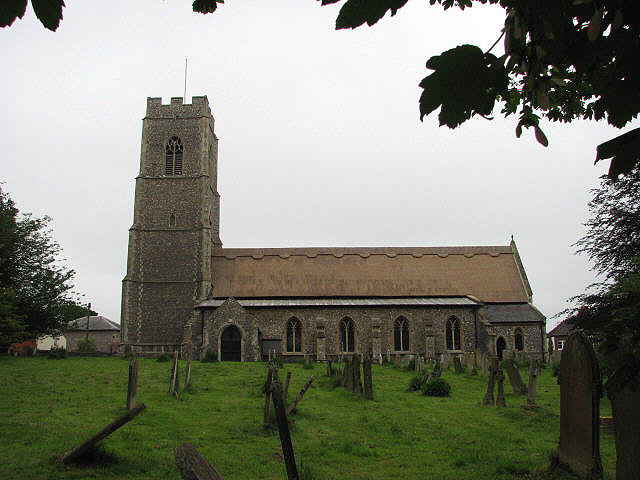
- Church of St. John the Baptist

- Location within Norfolk
- Area: 7.27 km^{2} (2.81 sq mi)
- Population: 1,446 (2021 census)
  - Density: 199/km^{2} (520/sq mi)
- OS grid reference: TG271197
- Civil parish: Coltishall
- District: Broadland
- Shire county: Norfolk
- Region: East
- Country: England
- Sovereign state: United Kingdom
- Post town: NORWICH
- Postcode district: NR12
- Dialling code: 01603
- Police: Norfolk
- Fire: Norfolk
- Ambulance: East of England
- UK Parliament: Broadland and Fakenham

Coltishall is a village and civil parish in the Broadland district, in the English county of Norfolk.

Coltishall is located on the River Bure and within the Norfolk Broads, 2.4 miles (3.9 km) north-west of Wroxham and 7.7 miles (12.4 km) north-east of Norwich.

In local dialect, Coltishall may be pronounced "Coltshall", "Coltshull" or "Cõlesil/Cõltsul".

== Etymology ==
Coltishall's name is of Old English origin and first attested in the Domesday Book of 1086 in the forms Cokereshala and Coketeshala. From 1200 onwards, it is attested in the contracted form Couteshal(e), in which form it has more or less remained to the present day (the l in the modern spelling is due to hypercorrection). The second part of the name is thought to derive from the Old English word halh ('nook') but the origin of the first part is uncertain; one guess is that it was an otherwise unattested personal name Coccede or Cohhede, and thus meant 'Coccede's nook'. However, The Cambridge Dictionary of English Place-Names concludes that "the recorded forms are too few and contradictory for satisfactory explanation".

== History ==
In the Domesday Book of 1086, Coltishall is recorded as a settlement of 16 households in the hundred of South Erpingham. In 1086, the village was divided between the estates of William de Warenne and Roger de Poitou.

In 1231, Coltishall was made a 'free-town' by King Henry III.

Furthermore, from the mid-Eighteenth Century, Coltishall was a centre for the malting industry with many wherries being built in the village.

In the late-Eighteenth Century, parts of the Bure Navigational Canal were dug in the parish to make the River Bure more easily navigable for watercraft.

Horstead Watermill, close to the village, was one of the most photographed mills in Britain until it burned down in 1963.

== RAF Coltishall ==
RAF Coltishall was opened in 1939 as a fighter station of the Royal Air Force during the Second World War. It became home to No. 242 Squadron RAF, which was largely composed of Canadian personnel who had suffered heavy losses in the Battle of France. Morale within the unit was low, and on 24 June 1940, the squadron was placed under the command of the legless fighter ace Douglas Bader. Bader quickly restored discipline, reshaped the squadron’s reputation, and led it effectively through the early stages of the Battle of Britain.

RAF Coltishall remained an active RAF station throughout the Cold War, later becoming a base for English Electric Lightning and SEPECAT Jaguar aircraft. The station was operational until its closure in November 2006, following a review by the Ministry of Defence.

The main technical site was subsequently repurposed as HM Prison Bure, a Category C prison for adult male offenders.

The adjoining married quarters and residential area were renamed Badersfield in honour of Douglas Bader. Although closely associated with RAF Coltishall, Badersfield does not fall within the civil parish of Coltishall. Instead, it lies partly in the parish of Scottow (in the North Norfolk district) and partly in the parish of Buxton with Lammas (in the Broadland district).

== Geography ==
According to the 2021 census, Coltishall has a population of 1,446 people which shows a decrease from the 1,503 people recorded in the 2011 census.

Coltishall is located on the River Bure and within the Norfolk Broads. The village is also located at the junction of the B1150, between Norwich and North Walsham, and the B1354, between Thursford and Hoveton.

== Church of St. John the Baptist ==
Coltishall's parish church is dedicated John the Baptist and dates at its earliest to the Fifteenth Century. St. John's is located on Church Street and has been Grade I listed since 1984.

The church was largely re-built in 1865 and boasts a Twelfth Century font made from Purbeck Marble. In addition, there is a good collection of stained-glass windows including some from the workshops of James Powell and Sons (depicting the Risen Christ) and memorial glass by Alfred Wilkinson.

Within the parish there is a ruined church dedicated to Saint Theobald of Provins which was built in the Eleventh Century and was abandoned in the Nineteenth Century.

== Notable residents ==
- Reverend John Alen- (1476–1534) priest and church lawyer, born in Coltishall.
- Sir John Alan- (1500–1561) statesman and Irish Lord Chancellor, born in Coltishall.
- Doctor John Smith- (1711–1795) academic and astronomer, born in Coltishall.
- Thomas Holloway- (1748–1827) painter and engraver, lived and died in Coltishall.
- Chaplain William Addison VC- (1883–1962) Church of England priest and army chaplain, Rector of Coltishall from 1938–1958.
- Gwyneth Johnstone- (1915–2010) painter, born and died in Coltishall.
- Robin Huggins- (b.1947) Norfolk cricketer, born in Coltishall.

== Climate ==
Climate in this area has mild differences between highs and lows, and there is adequate rainfall year-round. The Köppen climate classification subtype for this climate is "Cfb" (Marine West Coast Climate/Oceanic climate).

Climate data for Coltishall 17 m asl, 1991–2020
Month	Jan	Feb	Mar	Apr	May	Jun	Jul	Aug	Sep	Oct	Nov	Dec	Year
Record high °C (°F)	14.8 (58.6)	17.6 (63.7)	24.0 (75.2)	24.5 (76.1)	26.6 (79.9)	33.1 (91.6)	32.0 (89.6)	32.6 (90.7)	28.5 (83.3)	27.4 (81.3)	17.8 (64.0)	15.8 (60.4)	33.1 (91.6)
Mean daily maximum °C (°F)	7.5 (45.5)	8.1 (46.6)	10.4 (50.7)	13.2 (55.8)	16.3 (61.3)	19.2 (66.6)	21.7 (71.1)	21.7 (71.1)	18.9 (66.0)	14.9 (58.8)	10.8 (51.4)	8.0 (46.4)	14.2 (57.6)
Daily mean °C (°F)	4.7 (40.5)	4.9 (40.8)	6.7 (44.1)	9.0 (48.2)	12.0 (53.6)	14.8 (58.6)	17.2 (63.0)	17.1 (62.8)	14.7 (58.5)	11.3 (52.3)	7.5 (45.5)	5.1 (41.2)	10.5 (50.9)
Mean daily minimum °C (°F)	1.8 (35.2)	1.7 (35.1)	3.0 (37.4)	4.8 (40.6)	7.8 (46.0)	10.5 (50.9)	12.7 (54.9)	12.5 (54.5)	10.5 (50.9)	7.8 (46.0)	4.3 (39.7)	2.3 (36.1)	6.7 (44.1)
Record low °C (°F)	−15.3 (4.5)	−17.8 (0.0)	−10.7 (12.7)	−5.2 (22.6)	−2.7 (27.1)	1.8 (35.2)	1.2 (34.2)	3.7 (38.7)	−0.2 (31.6)	−5.0 (23.0)	−6.5 (20.3)	−13.6 (7.5)	−17.8 (0.0)
Average precipitation mm (inches)	55.1 (2.17)	45.2 (1.78)	46.2 (1.82)	38.6 (1.52)	46.5 (1.83)	63.2 (2.49)	57.5 (2.26)	66.5 (2.62)	59.6 (2.35)	70.4 (2.77)	71.2 (2.80)	64.0 (2.52)	683.9 (26.93)
Average precipitation days (≥ 1.0 mm)	11.5	11.0	9.2	8.8	7.9	9.5	9.4	9.2	9.4	11.4	12.8	12.9	123.0
Mean monthly sunshine hours	58.9	80.4	129.6	174.5	207.0	181.3	205.6	184.8	154.4	113.1	66.5	55.2	1,611.4
Source 1: Met Office
Source 2: Starlings Roost Weather

== Governance ==
Coltishall is both a civil parish and an electoral ward for local elections, falling within the district of Broadland. Local affairs are managed by Coltishall Parish Council.

At the district level, Coltishall is governed by Broadland District Council, and at the county level by Norfolk County Council.

Nationally, the village forms part of the Broadland and Fakenham parliamentary constituency, which has been represented by Jerome Mayhew of the Conservative Party since the 2019 general election.

== War Memorial ==
Coltishall's war memorial is a stone cross on the High Street which is shared with the nearby village of Great Hautbois. The memorial was unveiled in August 1920 and lists the following names for the First World War:

Rank	Name	Unit	Date of death	Burial
Capt.	Charles W. Archdale	5th Bn., Norfolk Regiment	20 November 1917	Cambrai Memorial
2Lt.	Edgar H. Collison	Norfolk Regt.	26 June 1916	St. Mary's Churchyard, East Bilney
CSM	Charlie Wells	8th Bn., East Surrey Regiment	1 July 1916	Thiepval Memorial
Sgt.	Stanley W. Nicholson	12th Bn., Norfolk Regt.	30 December 1917	Shatby Memorial
Cpl.	William H. Lemon	7th Bn., Border Regiment	3 July 1916	Thiepval Memorial
LCpl.	Bertie E. Gilham	7th Bn., Buffs	7 August 1918	Beacon Cemetery
LCpl.	Horace A. Daniels	10th Bn., East Yorkshire Regiment	2 April 1918	St. Sever Cemetery
Pte.	Frederick J. Hilling	4th Bn., Bedfordshire Regiment	16 January 1918	Mont-Huon Cemetery
Pte.	Charles A. Earl	8th Bn., Bedfordshire Regt.	14 October 1916	Thiepval Memorial
Pte.	Edward G. Billing	7th Bn., Border Regiment	2 May 1918	Forceville Cemetery
Pte.	Alfred H. Brighton	1st Bn., Cameronian Rifles	7 November 1918	Dourlers Cemetery
Pte.	Sidney Feek	54th (Kootenay) Bn., CEF	30 September 1918	Cantimpre Cemetery
Pte.	David Tunmore	2nd Bn., Duke of Wellington's Regt.	17 November 1918	Cambrai East Cemetery
Pte.	Jacob H. Landamore	8th Bn., East Surrey Regiment	9 August 1917	Menin Gate
Pte.	George F. Bean	103rd Coy., Machine Gun Corps	1 July 1916	Bapaume Post Cemetery
Pte.	Charles H. Brown	1st (Drake) Bn., Royal Naval Division	26 February 1917	St. Sever Cemetery
Pte.	John Bean	1st Bn., Norfolk Regt.	31 May 1915	Perth Cemetery
Pte.	William R. Chaplin	1st Bn., Norfolk Regt.	14 September 1914	La Ferté Memorial
Pte.	Arthur H. Riseborough	1st Bn., Norfolk Regt.	28 May 1918	Tannay Cemetery
Pte.	Jonathan E. Feltham	1/4th Bn., Norfolk Regt.	19 April 1917	Gaza War Cemetery
Pte.	Herbert J. Gilham	1/4th Bn., Norfolk Regt.	14 September 1915	Helles Memorial
Pte.	Benjamin Bean	7th Bn., Norfolk Regt.	12 October 1916	Thiepval Memorial
Pte.	George B. Burton	8th Bn., Norfolk Regt.	1 July 1916	Thiepval Memorial
Pte.	John R. Davison	8th Bn., Norfolk Regt.	21 October 1916	Thiepval Memorial
Pte.	Harry Graveling	9th Bn., Norfolk Regt.	10 February 1917	Bethune Town Cemetery
Pte.	Ivan J. A. Spinks	9th Bn., Norfolk Regt.	18 October 1916	Thiepval Memorial
Pte.	Arthur E. Youngs	9th Bn., Norfolk Regt.	17 November 1915	Hollybrook Cemetery
Pte.	Leslie Wells	1/5th Bn., Northumberland Fusilers	14 November 1916	Thiepval Memorial
Pte.	George H. Pye	2/7th Bn., Royal Warwickshire Regt.	18 August 1918	Tannay Cemetery
Pte.	Arthur T. Bullen	3rd Bn., Worcestershire Regiment	11 October 1916	Pozières Cemetery
Pte.	Ernest Riseborough	4th Bn., Worcestershire Regt.	2 June 1917	Arras Memorial
Spr.	Arthur Tunmore	55th Coy., Royal Engineers	27 July 1915	St. John's Churchyard
App.	Wilfred C. D. Walton	S.S. Arab	7 January 1918	Bizerte Cemetery

And, the following for the Second World War:

Rank	Name	Unit	Date of death	Burial
WO	Peter H. Watson	Royal Air Force Reserve	7 April 1945	Karachi War Cemetery
Sgt.	Basil G. Crisp	No. 75 Squadron RAF	16 August 1943	Olonne-sur-Mer Cemetery
Sgt.	Frederick H. Hilling	Royal Air Force	30 December 1942	St. John's Churchyard
Pte.	Arthur Y. Woods	2nd Bn., Royal Norfolk Regiment	27 May 1940	Dunkirk Memorial
Pte.	Benjamin H. Goodson	5th Bn., Royal Norfolks.	16 June 1944	Kanchanaburi War Cemetery
Pte.	Leonard M. Neville	5th Bn., Royal Norfolks.	21 September 1944	Kranji War Memorial
