= Stracey Arms Windpump =

Windmill in Norfolk, England

Coordinates: 52.62353°N 1.606034°E

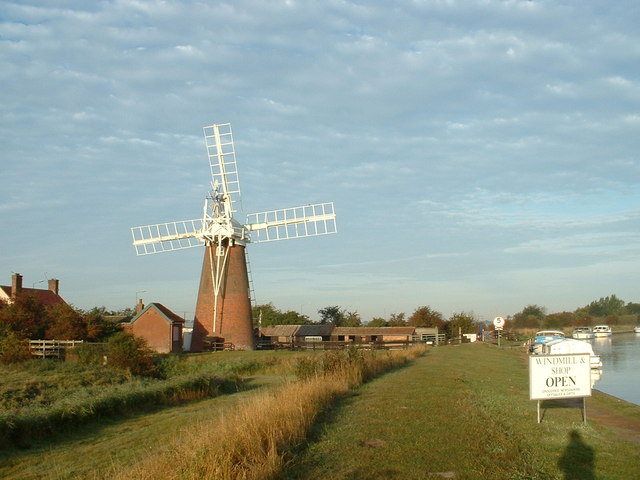
Stracey Arms Windpump

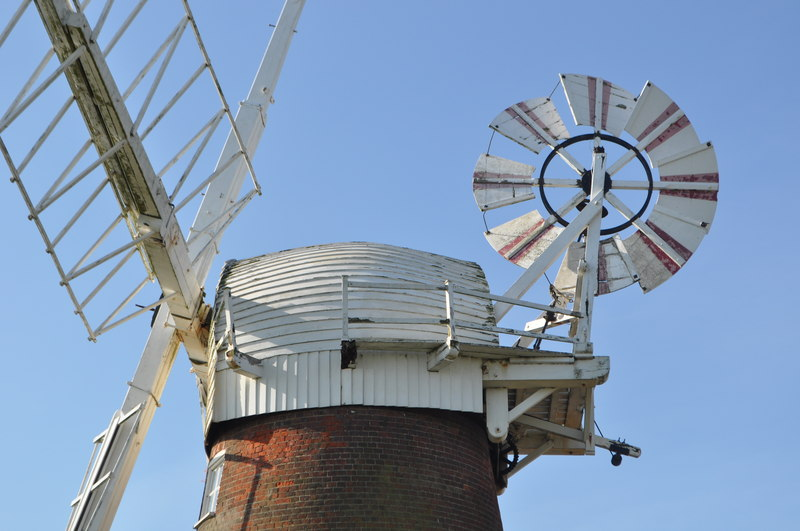
The cap assembly

Stracey Arms Windpump is a windpump located at Tunstall in the civil parish of Halvergate, Norfolk, England. It is a grade II* listed building. It takes its name from a nearby public house formerly called the Stracey Arms, after the local Stracey family.

It is a four-storey drainage mill with a tapering red brick tower and a boat shaped weatherboarded cap. The cap, cap gallery, sails, fan and tail pole are all in place. The internal machinery is in working order and drives a turbine pump. The pump was used to drain the surrounding marshland into a channel leading to the River Bure, but was superseded by an electric pump installed in an adjacent building.

The mill was built in 1883 by Robert Barnes of Great Yarmouth and was extensively modified in 1912. During the Second World War it was converted into a fortified pillbox with gun ports in the sides. It was taken out of service in 1946. From 1961 the mill was restored to working order by the Norfolk Windmills Trust, and now contains a photographic display of the history of Broads drainage mills. It is open to the public during the Spring and Summer.

== See also ==
- List of drainage windmills in Norfolk
