= Whitwell Elwin =

English clergyman, critic and editor

Whitwell Elwin (26 February 1816 – 1 January 1900) was an English clergyman, critic and editor of the Quarterly Review.

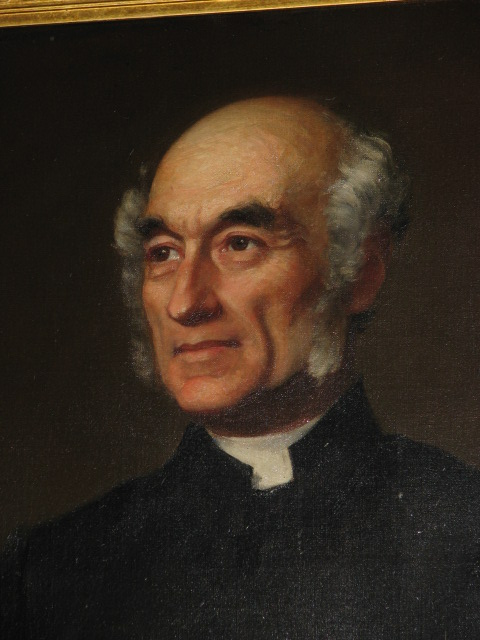
Whitwell Elwin

== Life ==
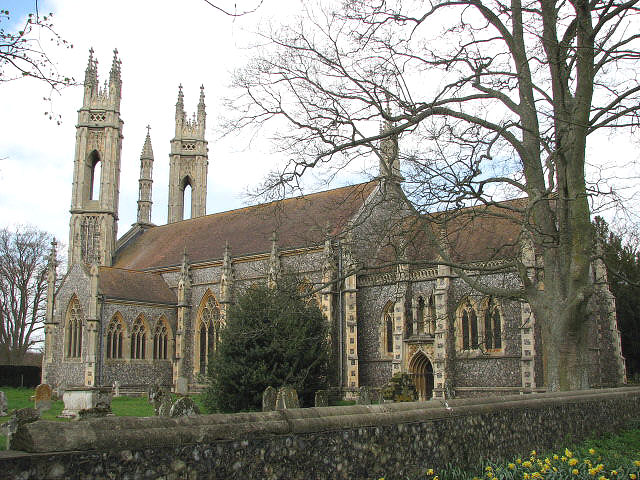
St Michael the Archangel's Church, Booton, now redundant

He was the son of Marsham Elwin, a country gentleman of Thurning, Norfolk, Whitwell Elwin studied at Caius College, Cambridge, and took holy orders in 1840. He was Rector of Booton, Norfolk from 1849 until his death. There he rebuilt St Michael the Archangel's Church to his own design.

== Works ==
Elwin was an important contributor to the Quarterly Review, of which he was editor from 1853 until 1860.

He undertook to complete John Wilson Croker's edition of Alexander Pope, and brought out five volumes, when he dropped it, leaving it to be finished by William John Courthope. As an editor he was extremely autocratic, and on all subjects had pronounced opinions, and often singular likes and dislikes.

The Quarterly Review was published by John Murray, who on 1 April 1859 agreed to publish Charles Darwin's book An abstract of an Essay on the Origin of Species and Varieties Through natural selection, without even seeing the manuscript. When the first three chapters were sent to Murray, he cautiously asked Elwin to review them. Elwin was initially opposed to publication of this book on evolution, but after consulting Darwin's colleague Charles Lyell, Elwin felt that for Darwin "to put forth the theory without the evidence would do grievous injustice to his views, & to his twenty years of observation & experiment. At every page I was tantalised by the absence of the proofs. All kinds of objections, & possibilities rose up in the mind, & it was fretting to think that the author had a whole array of facts, & inferences from the facts, absolutely essential to the decision of the question which were not before the reader." He recommended Lyell's suggestion that, to gain public agreement, rather than "put forth the theory without the evidence", the book should focus on observations upon pigeons, briefly stating how these illustrated Darwin's general principles and preparing the way for Darwin's larger work Natural Selection which was expected to follow soon: "Every body is interested in pigeons." Darwin responded that this was impractical, and his book retitled as On the Origin of Species was published on Thursday 24 November 1859.
