= St Michael the Archangel's Church, Booton =

Coordinates: 52.7574°N 1.1446°E

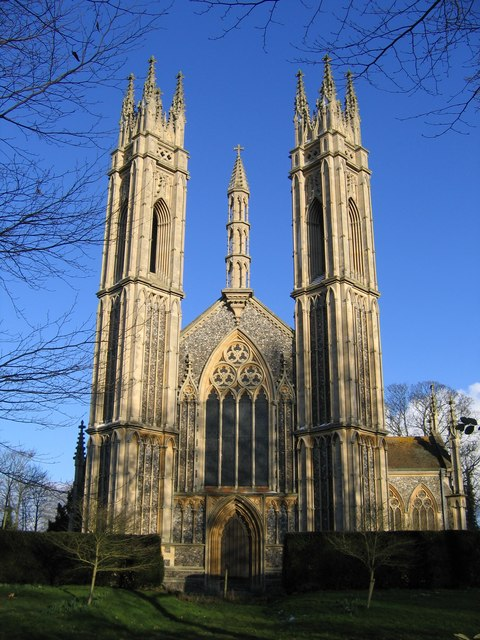
- West front of St Michael the Archangel's Church, Booton

- Location in Norfolk
- OS grid reference: TG 123 224
- Location: Booton, Norfolk
- Country: England
- Denomination: Anglican
- Website: Churches Conservation Trust

Architecture
- Functional status: Redundant
- Heritage designation: Grade II*
- Designated: 10 May 1961
- Architect: Rev Whitwell Elwin
- Architectural type: Church
- Style: Gothic Revival in French Gothic style

Specifications
- Materials: Flint with limestone dressings Tiled roofs

St Michael the Archangel's Church is a redundant Anglican church near the village of Booton, Norfolk, England. It is listed in the National Heritage List for England at Grade II* listed building, and is vested in the Churches Conservation Trust. The church stands about 1 mile (1.6 km) to the east of the village. It is often known as the "Cathedral of the Fields".

== History ==
St Michael's was built in the later part of the 19th century, replacing an earlier church on the site. The church, and its fittings, were designed by Rev Whitwell Elwin, the rector of the church from 1849 to 1900.

== Architecture ==
The church is faced in grey knapped flint with limestone dressings with tiled roofs tiled roofs. Its plan consists of a nave, a chancel, a north porch, a south vestry, and twin west towers. The whole is in an "eccentric French Gothic style". The towers are slender and set diagonally to the main orientation of the church, comprising three stages. The lower two stages containing elongated blank arcading. The top stage contains tall bell openings, and on the summit of the towers are pierced friezes with crocketed pinnacles on the corners. Between the towers is a doorway, over which a four-light window. A three-tier pinnacle rises from the top of the west gable with blank arcading. Along the sides of the church, the bays are separated by buttresses with crocketed pinnacles, and there are similar pinnacles on the gable ends. In the south wall of the chancel is a priest's door, and above this is an elaborately carved niche. Set inside the east wall of the north porch is a 14th-century headless statue of the Virgin and Child discovered during the rebuilding of the church.

The nave has a hammerbeam roof decorated with wooden angels carved by James Minns, a local master-carver. The roof of the chancel is a false hammer-beam. Above the chancel arch is a triangular opening. Around the nave wall is linenfold dado panelling. The pulpit and other fittings all date from the 19th century. The stained glass depicts angels, musicians, and female faces. The architect Edwin Lutyens said of the church that it was "very naughty but built in the right spirit".

The architect of the church and designer of the fittings and stained glass was the rector, Rev Whitwell Elwin, from 1853 to 1860 the editor of the Quarterly Review. He had no architectural training, and based his designs on details of other churches, and from his own imagination. According to the Churches Conservation Trust guidebook the west doorway was inspired by a doorway at Glastonbury Abbey, the triangular opening above the chancel arch by Lichfield Cathedral, the stained glass in the nave windows from St Mary's Church at Temple Balsall, Warwickshire, and that in the west window by St Stephen's Chapel in the Palace of Westminster. The hammer beam roof is said to be based on that of Saint Botolph's Church in Trunch, Norfolk.

== External features ==
There are two structures in the churchyard which are listed Grade II for their group value with the church. One is the 19th-century boundary wall of the churchyard, together with two sets of gate piers and wooden gates. The other is a late 19th-century sexton's store, constructed in flint with stone dressings and tiled roofs. Its façade has three gables with coped parapets and ball finials.

== See also ==
- List of churches preserved by the Churches Conservation Trust in the East of England
