= Brandiston =

Village in Norfolk, England

Coordinates: 52.751°N 1.157°E

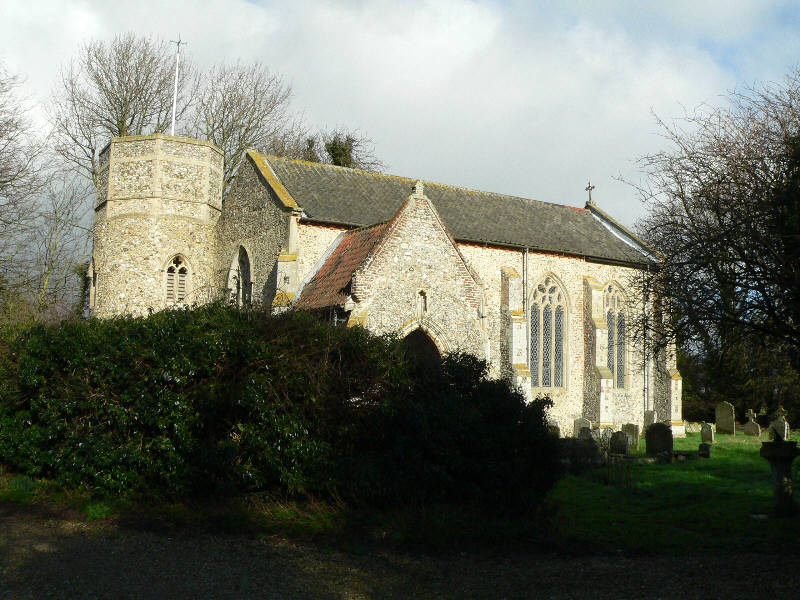
- Brandiston St Nicholas

- Location within Norfolk
- Area: 3.14 km^{2} (1.21 sq mi)
- Population: 44 (2001 census)
  - Density: 14/km^{2} (36/sq mi)
- OS grid reference: TG130218
- Civil parish: Brandiston
- District: Broadland
- Shire county: Norfolk
- Region: East
- Country: England
- Sovereign state: United Kingdom
- Post town: NORWICH
- Postcode district: NR10
- Dialling code: 01603
- Police: Norfolk
- Fire: Norfolk
- Ambulance: East of England
- UK Parliament: Broadland and Fakenham

Brandiston is a civil parish in the English county of Norfolk. It is 2.3 miles (3.7 km) south-east of Reepham and 10 miles (16 km) north-west of Norwich. The parish includes the site of the former village of Guton. Both Brandiston and Guton are extremely small settlements with a population for the parish of 44 at the 2001 Census. The bulk of the parish is farmland, mainly arable. At the 2011 Census the population was less than 100 and was included with the civil parish of Booton.

== History ==
Brandiston's name is of Anglo-Saxon origin. In the Domesday Book it is recorded as a settlement of four households in the hundred of Eynesford. In 1086, the village was part of the estates of William the Conqueror.

Brandiston Hall was built in the 17th-century on the grounds of a medieval hospital, the hall was later expanded in the 19th-century. The still stands and has been Grade II listed since 1952. In the 1850s, four almshouses were built for the benefit of the parishioners. These were funded by the generous donations of a William Gurney almost three-hundred years earlier.

During the Second World War, RAF Swannington was built in the parish. Hawker Hurricanes of No. 85 Squadron RAF and de Havilland Mosquitos of No. 157 Squadron RAF were based at the airfield. The aircraft fell into disuse after the war and was eventually sold in 1957, mostly returning to agricultural use.

== Church ==
Brandiston's parish church is dedicated to Saint Nicholas and is one of Norfolk's remaining 124 round-tower churches. The church dates from the 12th-century, although it was re-modelled in the 14th-century and later restored by Edward Blore in 1844 at the behest of the local Athill family. Within the church is a stained-glass window designed by the Percy Bacon Brothers. The building is Grade II listed. Today, the church is maintained by the Churches Conservation Trust.

== Governance ==
Brandiston is part of the electoral ward of Great Witchingham for local elections and is part of the district of Broadland. It is part of the Broadland and Fakenham parliamentary constituency.
