= William John Courthope =

19th/20th-century British writer

William John Courthope, CB, FBA (17 July 1842 – 10 April 1917) was an English writer and historian of poetry, whose father was rector of South Malling, Sussex.

== Life ==
From Harrow School he went to New College, Oxford; took first-classes in classical moderations and greats; and won the Newdigate prize for poetry (1864) and the Chancellors English essay (1868). He seemed destined for distinction as a poet, his volume of Ludibria Lunae (1869) being followed in 1870 by the remarkably fine Paradise of Birds. But a certain academic quality of mind seemed to check his output in verse and divert it into the field of criticism.

Apart from many contributions to the higher journalism, his literary career is associated mainly with his continuation of the edition of Pope's works, begun by Whitwell Elwin, which appeared in ten volumes from 1871 to 1889; his life of Addison (Men of Letters series, 1882); his Liberal Movement in English Literature (1885); and his tenure of the professorship of Poetry at Oxford (1895–1901), which resulted in his elaborate History of English Poetry (the first volume appearing in 1895), and his Life in Poetry (1901). He published a selection from Martial's Epigrams in 1914, and a volume of verse, The Country Town and other Poems, appeared in 1920.

He dealt with the history of English poetry as a whole, and in its unity as a result of the national spirit and thought in succeeding ages, and attempted to bring the great poets into relation with this. In 1887 he was appointed a civil service commissioner, being first commissioner in 1892, and being made a CB. He was made an honorary fellow of his old college at Oxford in 1896, and was given the honorary degrees of D.Litt. by Durham in 1895 and of LL.D. by Edinburgh University in 1898.

His daughter, Katharine Courthope, married Reverend Charles Fiennes Cholmondeley (born 26 Nov 1863, d. Dec 1959).

Government offices
Preceded by Sir George Webbe Dasent	First Civil Service Commissioner; 1892–1907	Succeeded by Lord Francis Hervey
