= Robin Huggins =

English cricketer (born 1947)

Personal information
- Full name: Robin David Paul Huggins
- Born: 28 April 1947 (age 79); Coltishall, Norfolk, England
- Batting: Right-handed

Domestic team information
- Years: Team
- 1965–1989: Norfolk

Career statistics
Competition	List A
Matches	4
Runs scored	91
Batting average	22.75
100s/50s	–/–
Top score	29
Balls bowled	–
Wickets	–
Bowling average	–
5 wickets in innings	–
10 wickets in match	–
Best bowling	–
Catches/stumpings	1/–
- Source: Cricinfo, 29 June 2011

Robin David Paul Huggins (born 18 April 1947) is a former English cricketer. Huggins was a right-handed batsman. He was born in Coltishall, Norfolk.

Huggins made his debut for Norfolk in the 1965 Minor Counties Championship against Lincolnshire. Huggins played Minor counties cricket for Norfolk from 1965 to 1989, which included 156 Minor Counties Championship matches and 17 MCCA Knockout Trophy matches. He made his List A debut against Leicestershire in the 1982 NatWest Trophy. He made 3 further List A appearances, the last coming against Leicestershire in the 1985 NatWest Trophy. In his 4 List A matches, he scored 91 runs at an average of 22.75, with a high score of 29.
