= St Faith's Church, Little Witchingham =

Coordinates: 52.7383°N 1.1323°E

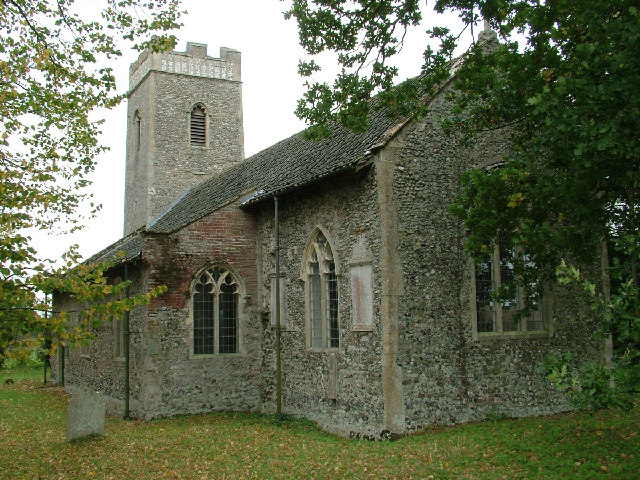
- St Faith's Church, Little Witchingham, from the southeast

- Location in Norfolk
- OS grid reference: TG 115 203
- Location: Little Witchingham, Norfolk
- Country: England
- Denomination: Anglican
- Website: Churches Conservation Trust

History
- Dedication: Saint Faith

Architecture
- Functional status: Redundant
- Heritage designation: Grade II*
- Designated: 22 July 1983
- Architectural type: Church
- Style: Gothic
- Groundbreaking: 12th century

Specifications
- Materials: Flint with stone and brick dressings

St Faith's Church is a redundant Anglican church in the village of Little Witchingham in Norfolk, England. It is recorded in the National Heritage List for England as a designated Grade II* listed building, and is under the care of the Churches Conservation Trust. It stands in a relatively isolated position in country lanes, about 9 miles (14 km) northwest of Norwich and 3 miles (5 km) south of Reepham. It is notable for its sequence of medieval wall paintings.

== History ==
St Faith's has its origins in the 12th century, although most of its fabric is from the 14th century. The tower was added in the 15th century. In the 1930s the church had fallen into disuse and it became a ruin. In 1967 Eve Baker climbed through a window and rediscovered the existence of medieval wall paintings. These were renovated and the church was repaired by the Norfolk Churches Trust and the Council for the Care of Churches. It is now vested in the Churches Conservation Trust. As of 2011 the church is kept locked because many of its floor tiles were stolen in 2008, but a key can be obtained nearby.

== Architecture ==
The church is constructed in flint rubble with stone and brick dressings. Its plan consists of a nave with a south aisle, a chancel and a west tower. The tower is without buttresses, and its battlemented parapet is decorated with a frieze and flushwork panels. Along the south side of the aisle and chancel, and in the east end of the aisle, are two-light windows. The east window has three lights. In the north wall is a blocked doorway. The south wall of the chancel contains a fragment of a stone preaching cross, carved with an image of the Crucifixion. Inside the church the south arcade is carried on octagonal piers and the arches are decorated with zigzag patterns. The roof of the nave and chancel dates from the 18th century.

== Wall paintings ==
The wall paintings date from the middle of the 14th century, and have suffered varying degrees of damage. The roundels in the arcades depict the Four Evangelists. Along the top of the south wall of the church is a painting depicting the apostles around the risen Christ. Below this is a sequence of paintings showing events in the Passion of Christ. Under these is decoration with vines and scrolling. The paintings elsewhere are not as clear. One shows parts of Saint George killing the Dragon, another is thought to have contained Saint Christopher, and another possibly is of The Three Living and the Three Dead.

== See also ==
- List of churches preserved by the Churches Conservation Trust in the East of England
