= Mont-Huon Military Cemetery =

Military cemetery in Seine-Maritime, France

- Commonwealth War Graves Commission
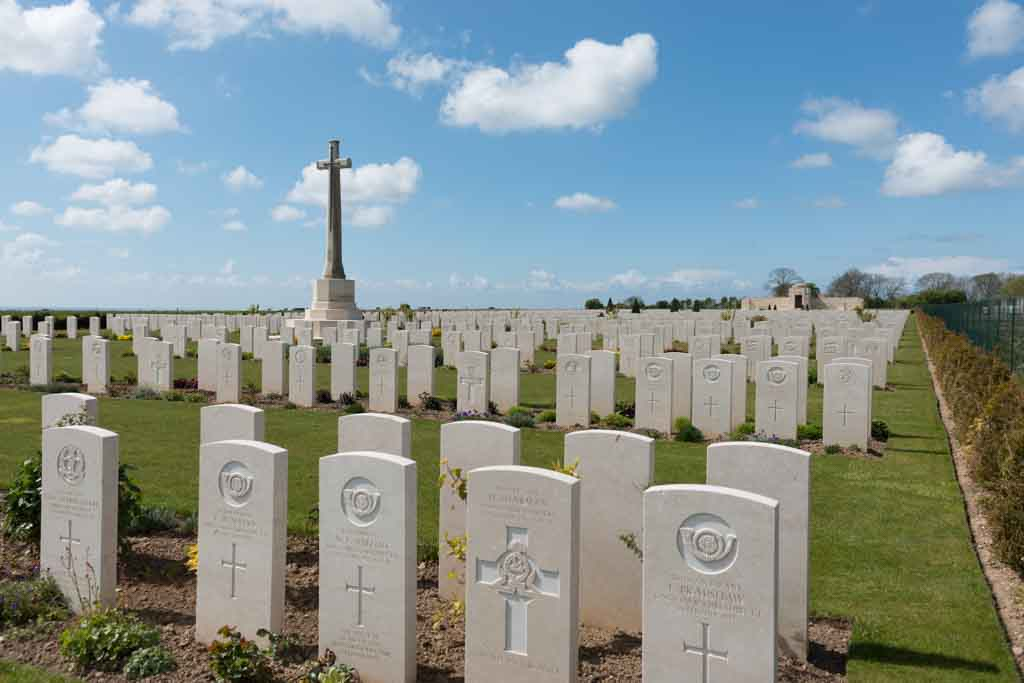
- Used for those deceased 1917–19, 1940
- Location: 50°02′46″N 1°21′54″E near Le Tréport, Somme
- Designed by: Sir Reginald Blomfield
- Total burials: Over 2,300
- Unknowns: 0

Burials by nation
- Allied – 2,134; Germany – over 200

Burials by war
- First World War – 2,128 (Allied); Second World War – 7 (Allied)

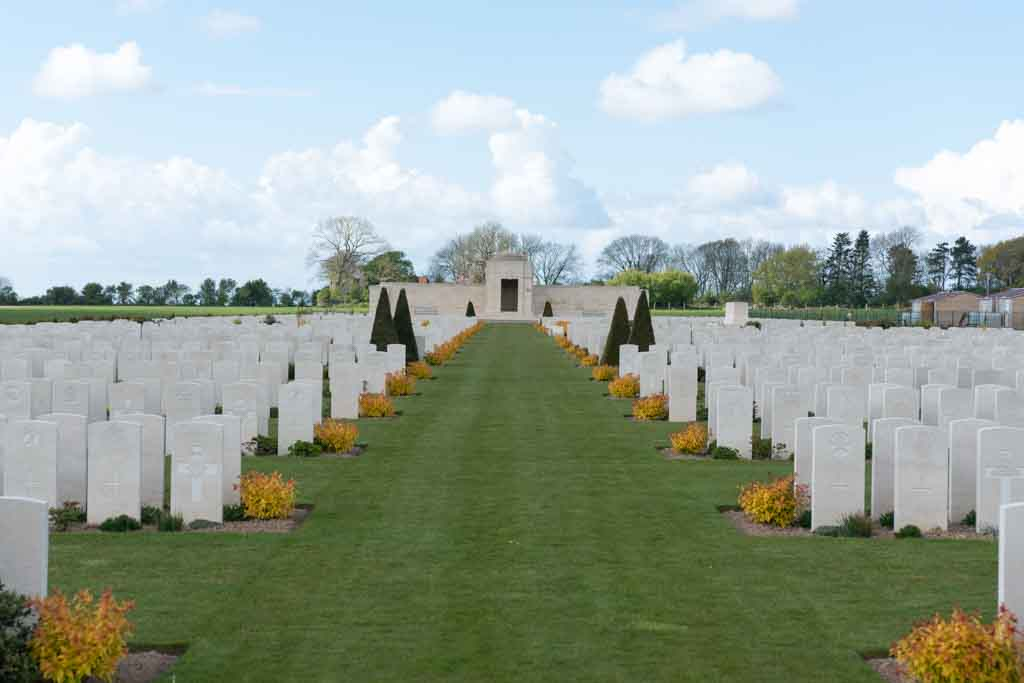
Mont-Huon Military Cemetery, the Stone Shelter and a general view.

Mont-Huon Military Cemetery is a Commonwealth War Graves Commission cemetery close to Le Tréport, north-west of Dieppe on the north-west coast of France. The cemetery holds over 2,300 dead from both World War I and World War II.

== History ==
Le Tréport was the scene of much Allied activity during World War I due to its proximity to the front line, it had ready access to England and was chosen to establish a hospital where the Trianon Grand Hotel was put into service to provide 500 beds. The local civilian cemetery quickly became over-crowded and the first military cemetery also become over-crowded, requiring the establishment of Mont-Huon in the summer of 1917.

The Second World War saw the reopening of the cemetery to cope with the casualties of that war. Seven men are buried in Mont-Huon Military Cemetery from World War II, in two separate sections.

The slight discrepancy (by one) in the number of Allied burials (WW1=2,128 & WW2=7; total = 2,135 v 2,134) is because there is one non-combatant buried in Mont-Huon. Mrs Gertrude Chambers, who died 1 December 1918 aged 27 is interred in Mont-Huon. Her headstone reads "Had he asked us we would say God we love her let her stay".

== The cemetery ==
Designed by Sir Reginald Blomfield, Mont-Huon Military Cemetery contains the remains of soldiers from the Allies and Germany.

In total, the cemetery contains 2,349 burials of which over 200 are German burials.

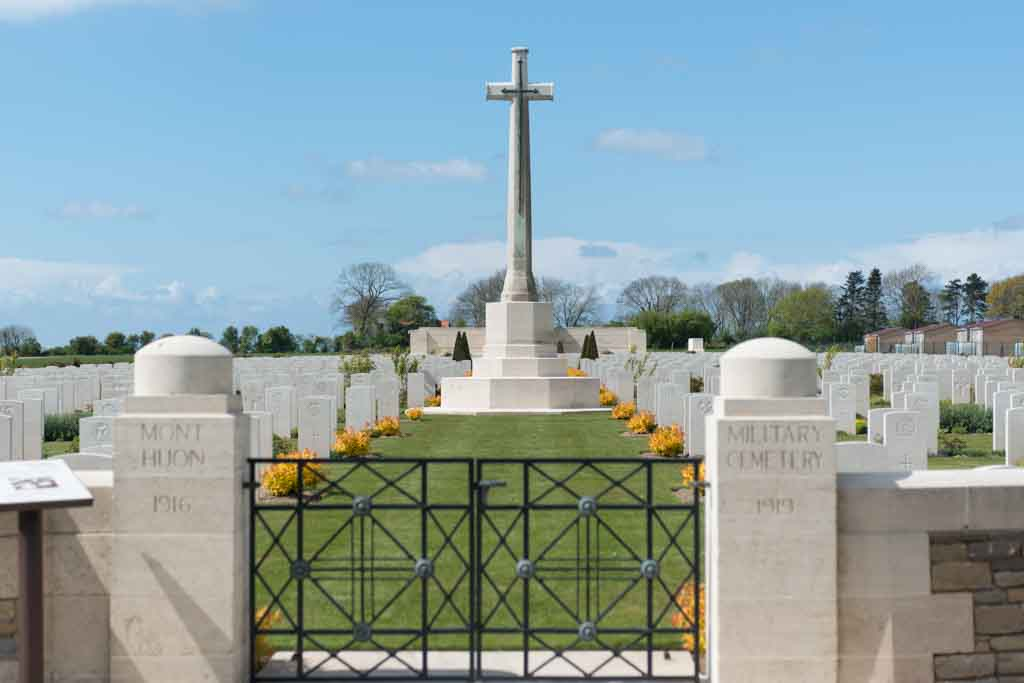
Entrance

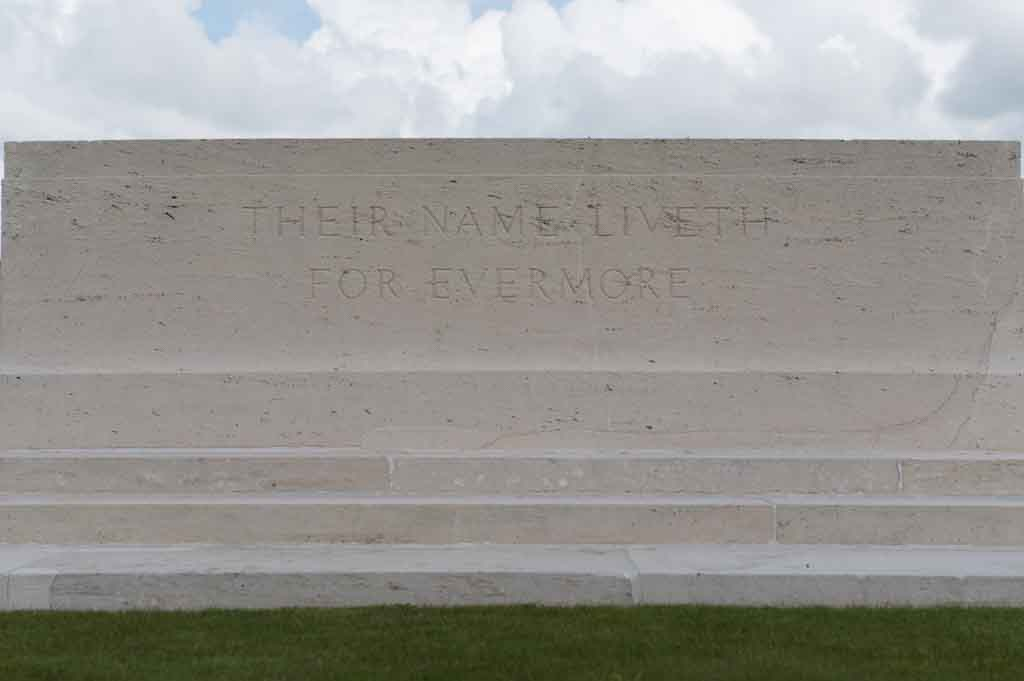
Stone of Remembrance

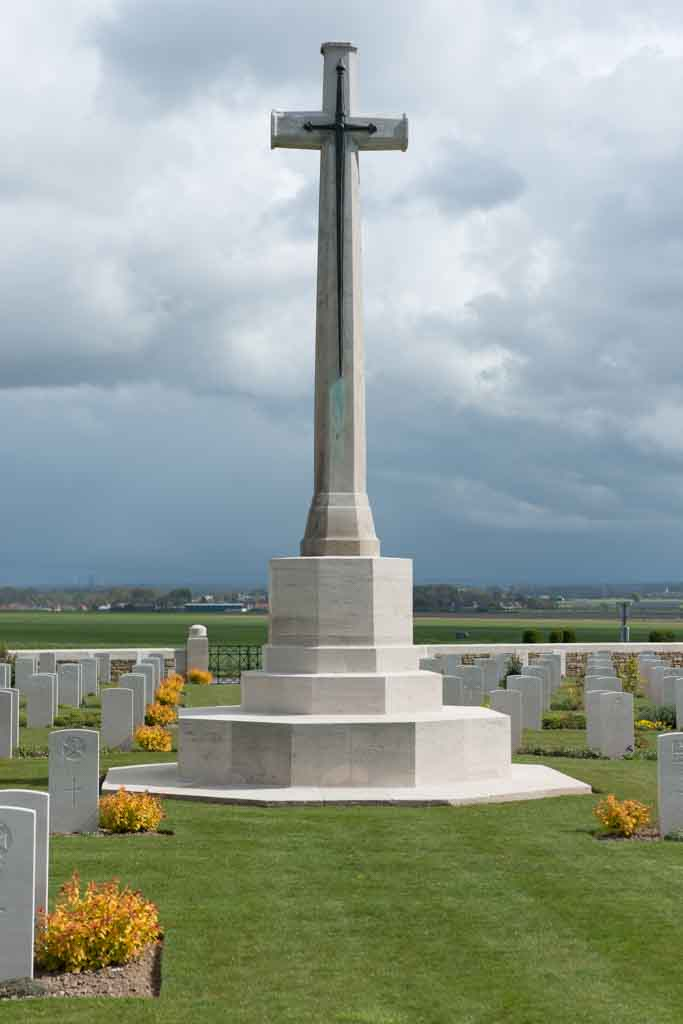
The Cross of Sacrifice

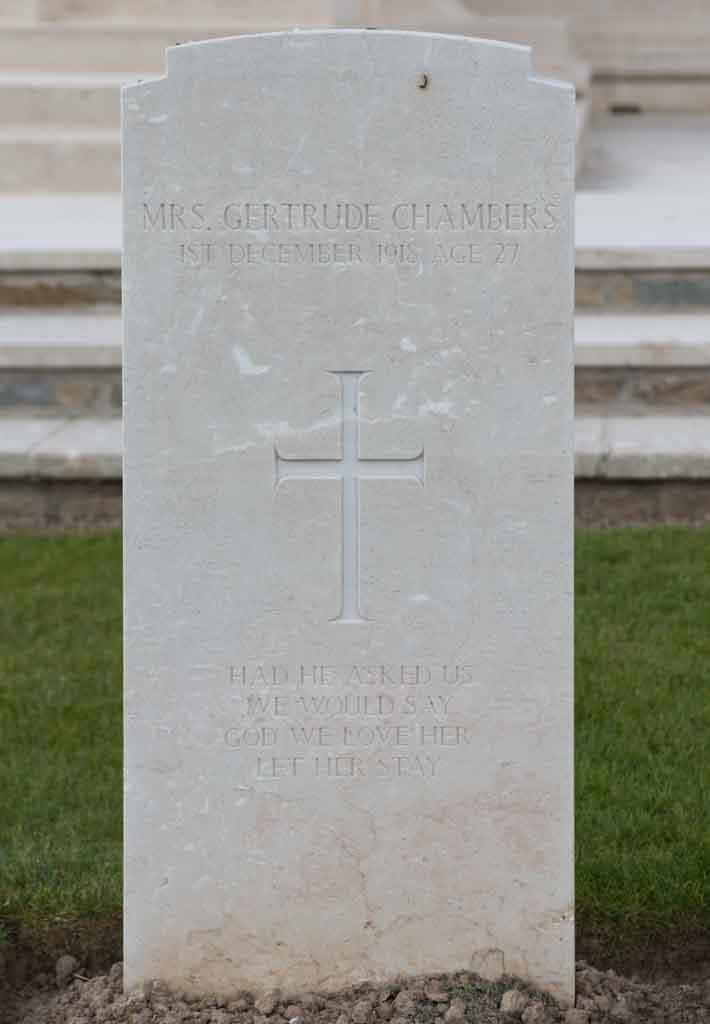
Mrs Chambers' headstone

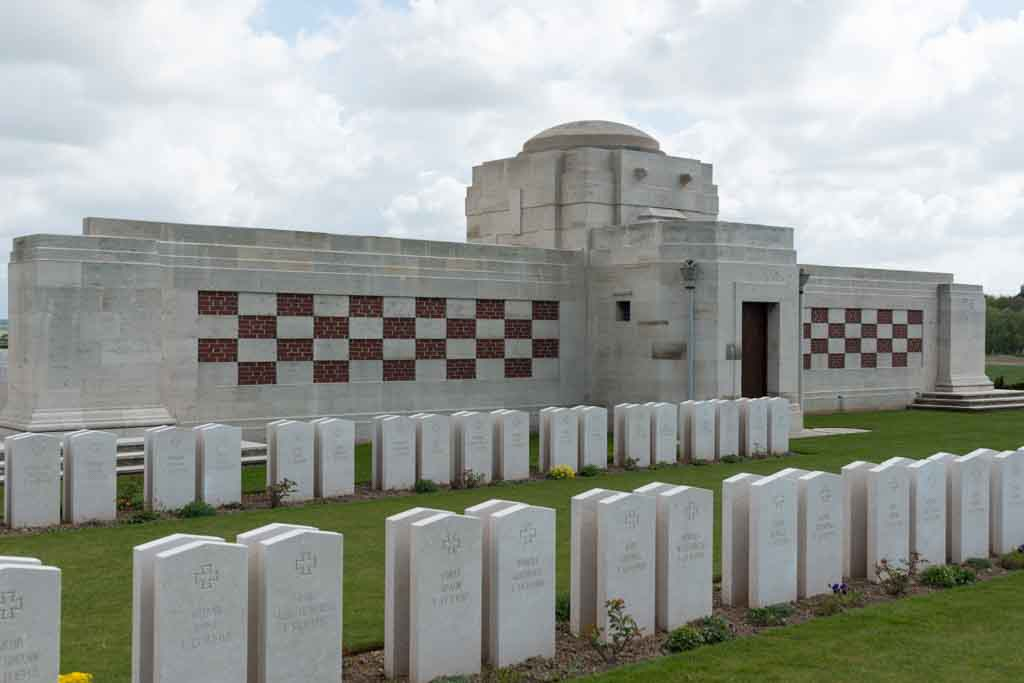
Some of the German headstones, with pointed tops
