= Little Witchingham =

Village in Norfolk, England

Coordinates: 52.74073°N 1.13905°E

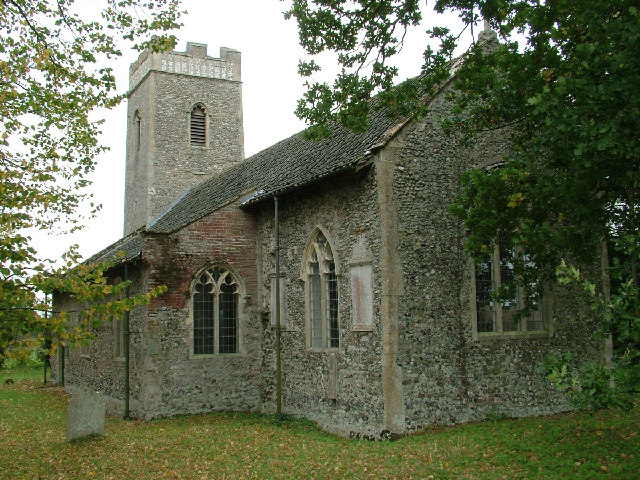
- St Faith's Church, Little Witchingham

- Location within Norfolk
- Area: 3.01 km^{2} (1.16 sq mi)
- Population: 36
  - Density: 12/km^{2} (31/sq mi)
- OS grid reference: TG119205
- Civil parish: Little Witchingham
- District: Broadland
- Shire county: Norfolk
- Region: East
- Country: England
- Sovereign state: United Kingdom
- Post town: NORWICH
- Postcode district: NR9
- Police: Norfolk
- Fire: Norfolk
- Ambulance: East of England

Little Witchingham is a village and civil parish in the English county of Norfolk. It covers an area of 3.01 km^{2} (1.16 sq mi) and had a population of 36 in 14 households at the 2001 census. For the purposes of local government, it falls within the district of Broadland.

St Faith's Church (right) has a Saxo-Norman north wall, but the rest of the building dates to the medieval period. It was built circa 1300. The church was ruinous for many years, but was saved when the art historian Eve Baker discovered it contained very beautiful C14th wall paintings. They depict, amongst other subjects, St George and the dragon and ‘The Three Living and the Three Dead’ surrounded by some gorgeous twirling vine leaf decorations. The church is redundant and now cared for by the Churches Conservation Trust, but is open to the public.
