= Mutton's Mill =

Windmill in Halvergate, Norfolk, England

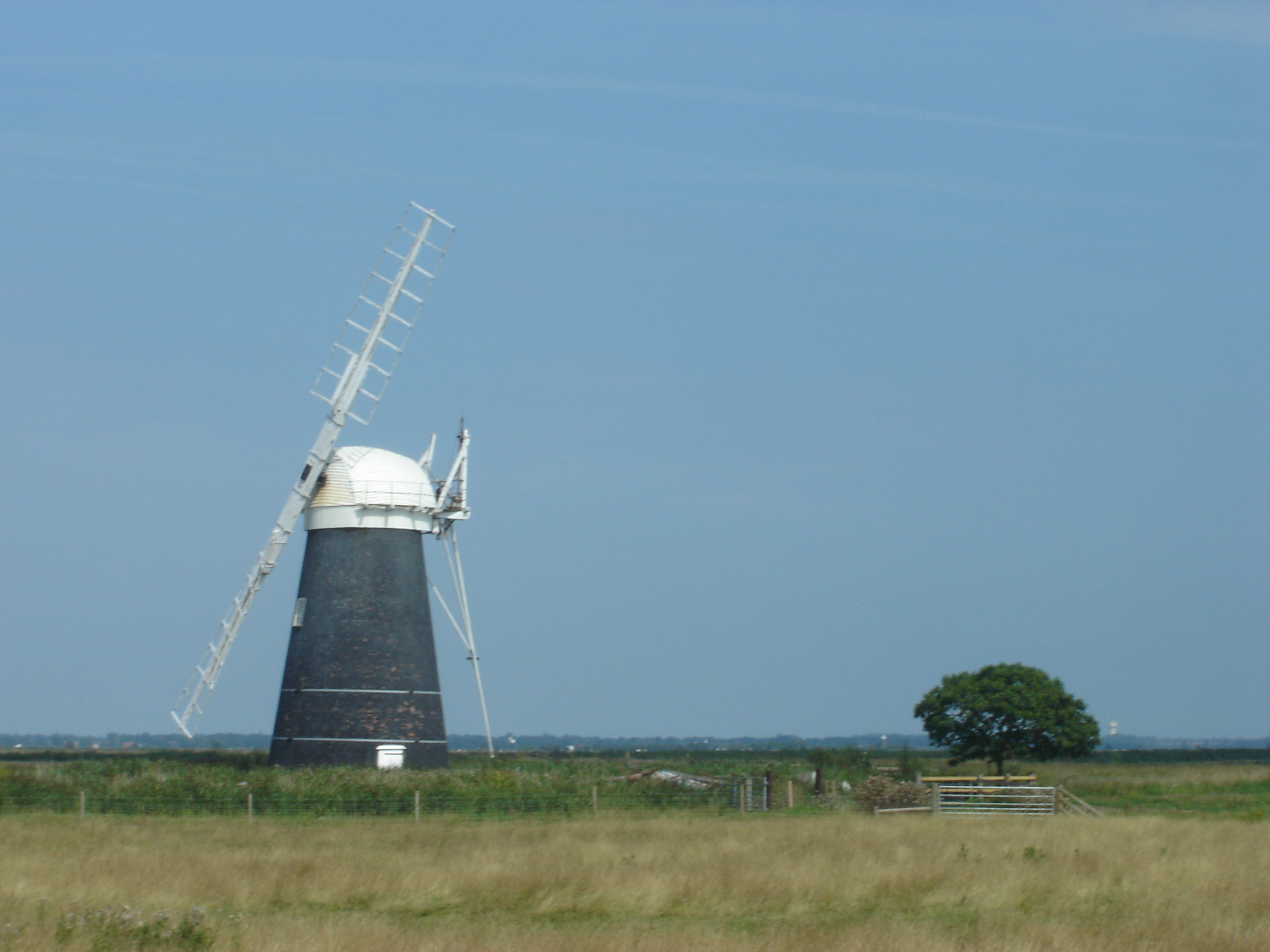
- Mutton's Mill, August 2006
- Interactive map of Mutton's Mill

Origin
- Mill name: Mutton's Mill; Manor House Mill
- Mill location: Halvergate, Norfolk, United Kingdom
- Grid reference: TG 4410 0586
- Coordinates: 52°36′00″N 1°36′13″E
- Year built: C.1830

Information
- Purpose: Drainage mill
- Type: Tower mill
- Storeys: Four storeys
- No. of sails: Four
- Type of sails: Patent sails
- Windshaft: Cast iron
- Winding: Fantail
- Fantail blades: Six
- Type of pump: Scoopwheel

Mutton's Mill, or Manor House Mill, is a windpump located on the Halvergate Marshes in the detached parish of Freethorpe within The Broads in the English county of Norfolk. The mill is a Grade II* listed building and is 1 mile (1.6 km) east of the village of Halvergate and 2 miles (3.2 km) north-west of Berney Arms. It lies close to the route of the Weavers' Way long-distance footpath.

== History ==
Mutton's Mill was built c.1830. It worked until 1947 with Fred Mutton as the last marshman. The mill was used to drain the surrounding marshland into the Halvergate Fleet. Arthur C. Smith surveyed the mill on 17 September 1973. He described it as a derelict tower mill without its cap. It had four Patent sails, windshaft and brake wheel, and retained its internal machinery. Restoration of the mill commenced in 1975. By 1976, the sails had then been removed and the tower roofed. The mill was listed Grade II* on 26 February 1987. Smith surveyed the mill again on 5 July 1988. The mill then had its cap and fantail, but no sails. These had been fitted in 1984. In 1998, a pair of Patent sails were fitted. The fantail was blown off in 2005. Ir was replaced in 2008.

== Description ==
Mutton's Mill is a four storey tower mill. The tower is 44 feet (13 m) tall. It is 24 feet (7.3 m) diameter at the base. It has a boat shape cap with petticoat and gallery. A cast iron windshaft carried four double Patent sails, which had eight bays of three shutters. The windshaft also carries a wooden clasp arm brake wheel. This drives a cast iron wallower at the top of the wooden upright shaft. A cast iron crown wheel at the bottom of the upright shaft drives a cast iron pit wheel, which drives the internal scoopwheel.
