= St Nicholas Church, Brandiston =

Coordinates: 52.7480°N 1.1712°E

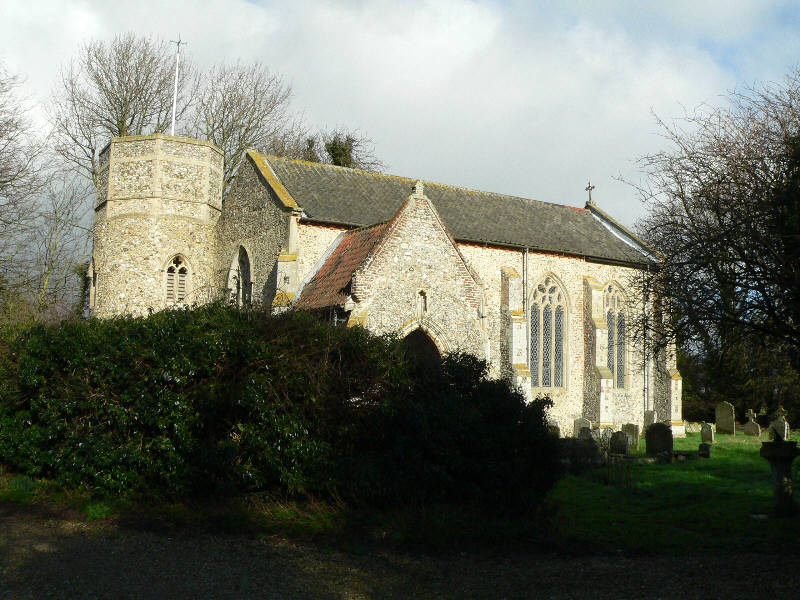
- St Nicholas Church from the southwest

- Location in Norfolk
- OS grid reference: TG 141 214
- Location: Brandiston, Norfolk
- Country: England
- Denomination: Anglican
- Website: Churches Conservation Trust

History
- Dedication: Saint Nicholas

Architecture
- Functional status: Redundant
- Heritage designation: Grade II*
- Designated: 10 May 1961
- Architectural type: Church
- Style: Norman, Gothic

Specifications
- Materials: Flint with limestone dressings Tiled roofs

St Nicholas Church is a redundant Anglican church in the village of Brandiston, Norfolk, England. It is recorded in the National Heritage List for England as a designated Grade II* listed building, and is under the care of the Churches Conservation Trust. It stands next to Brandiston Hall.

== History ==
The oldest standing part of the church is the lower part of the tower, which dates from the 12th century. The present north aisle was originally the nave, and it still contains some 12th-century fabric. The rest of the north aisle and the nave date from the 14th century. The chancel and south porch were added in the 15th century. By the 18th century the chancel had been demolished. In the 19th century the octagonal top was added to the tower. The church was substantially restored in 1844.

== Architecture ==
The church is constructed in flint rubble with limestone dressings. The roofs are tiled. Its plan is simple, consisting of a nave with a north aisle, the eastern end of the nave acting as the chancel, a south porch and a west tower. The lower part of the tower is round, with an octagonal top stage. The west wall of the nave has a three-light window. In the south wall are three large windows, one in Decorated style, the other two Perpendicular. Supporting the east wall are two brick buttresses.

Inside the church is a three-bay arcade supported on quatrefoil piers, with double-chamfered arches. The nave ceiling is plastered. All the fittings and benches date from the 19th century. The windows in the south wall of the nave contain some medieval stained glass.

== See also ==
- List of churches preserved by the Churches Conservation Trust in the East of England
