= Buxton with Lamas =

Civil parish in Norfolk, England

Coordinates: 52.759°N 1.326°E

- Civil parish
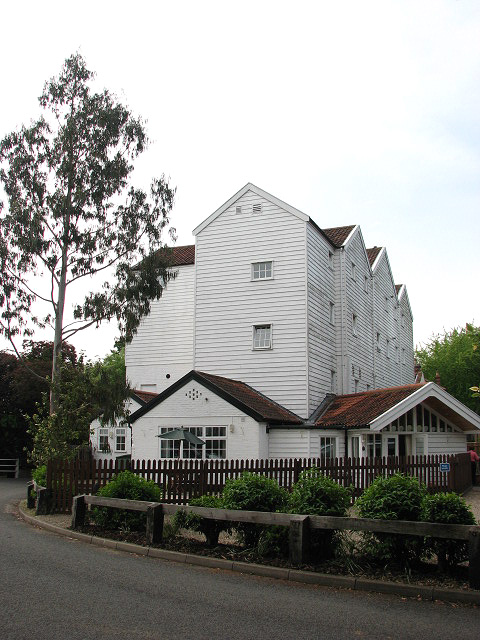
- Buxton Watermill

- Location within Norfolk
- Area: 8.74 km^{2} (3.37 sq mi)
- Population: 1,639 (2021 census)
  - Density: 188/km^{2} (490/sq mi)
- OS grid reference: TG244231
- District: Broadland
- Shire county: Norfolk
- Region: East
- Country: England
- Sovereign state: United Kingdom
- Post town: Norwich
- Postcode district: NR10
- Dialling code: 01603
- Police: Norfolk
- Fire: Norfolk
- Ambulance: East of England
- UK Parliament: Broadland and Fakenham

Buxton with Lamas is a civil parish in the English county of Norfolk. It includes the villages of Buxton to the west of the River Bure, Lamas on the eastern side of the river, and the hamlet of Little Hautbois.

The River Bure is crossed by the Bure Valley Railway on a 105-foot (32 m) long girder bridge. Buxton station is a halt on the railway. The former railway station on the Great Eastern Railway was Buxton Lamas and closed in the 1960s. Buxton Watermill is on the river.

For local government purposes, the two villages jointly elect Buxton with Lamas Parish Council, and fall within the area covered by Broadland District Council.

== Demographics ==
Census population of Buxton with Lamas parish
Census	Population	Female	Male	Households	Source
2001	1,685	835	850	661	
2011	1,684	838	846	694	
2021	1,639	819	820	699	
