= John Lubbock, 2nd Baron Avebury =

British peer & banker (1858–1929)

The Right Honourable The Lord Avebury DL
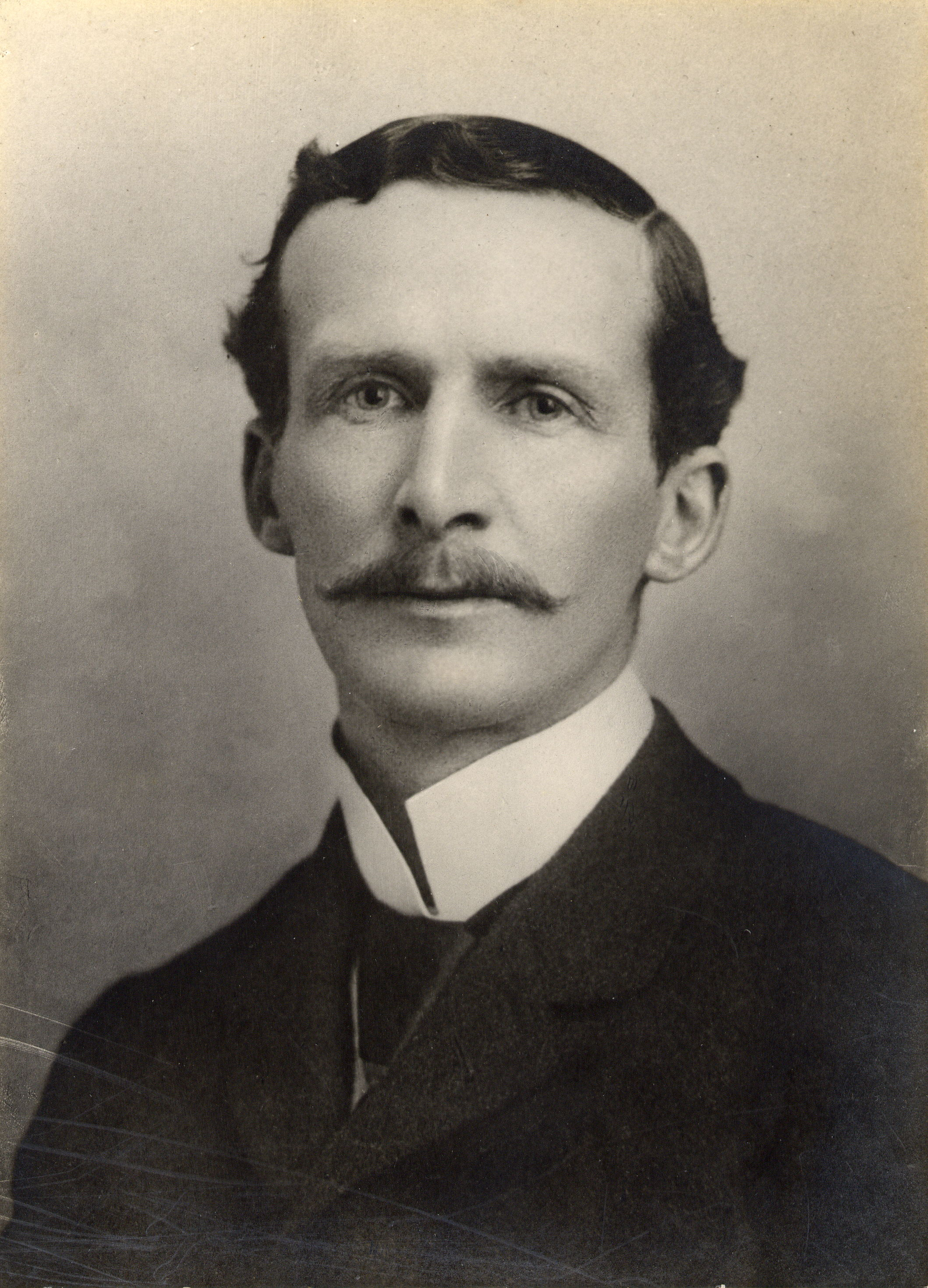
- John Lubbock, 2nd Baron Avebury

Member of the House of Lords
- Lord Temporal
- In office 28 May 1913 – 26 March 1929
- Preceded by: The 1st Baron Avebury
- Succeeded by: The 3rd Baron Avebury

Personal details
- Born: John Birkbeck Lubbock; 4 October 1858 Farnborough, Kent, England
- Died: 26 March 1929 (aged 70) Farnborough, Kent, England
- Parents: John Lubbock, 1st Baron Avebury (father); Ellen Frances Horden (mother)
- Relatives: John Lubbock (nephew)
- Education: Balliol College, Oxford
- Occupation: Banker

John Birkbeck Lubbock, 2nd Baron Avebury (4 October 1858 – 26 March 1929), was a British aristocrat and banker.

== Background ==
He was the eldest son of John Lubbock, 1st Baron Avebury and his first wife Ellen Frances Hordern. He succeeded his father as Baron Avebury upon his death in 1913. He was born, and died, at the family home, High Elms, in Farnborough.

He was educated at Eton College, and then at Balliol College, Oxford, where he graduated as B.A. and M.A. in the same year of 1885.

== Career ==
Lubbock was a director of the family banking firm, Robbarts, Lubbock and Company, from 1880 until 1914 when it was taken over by Coutts & Co., where he became a director in turn, and of the British National Provincial Bank and a member of the boards of five colonial banks, eight insurance companies and five investment trusts, including the Bank of New Zealand, Lloyd's of London, Royal Exchange Assurance Co, Australian Mortgage Land and Finance Co., and Australian Mercantile Land and Finance Co.

In 1925 he chaired the Lubbock Committee looking at repayment of War Savings Certificates.

He was also a Deputy Lieutenant for the county of Kent.

== Sports ==
In his youth, he was a keen sportsman. At school he played both association football and cricket although not in their representative XIs, but he won in 1876 a game of Eton Fives with Ivo Bligh who was later famous as the captain of the England cricket team of "Ashes" fame.

At university, he joined the Oxford University A.F.C., playing with them in the FA Cup ties of 1879–80 up to the Cup Final at Kennington Oval on 10 April 1880, when his team lost 1–0 to Clapham Rovers. He also played against Cambridge University as a football 'Blue' in 1881, and was also a 'Blue' at real tennis when he lost in the doubles.

He played cricket for the M.C.C., I Zingari and West Kent, and, later in life, scratch golf.

== Sporting honours ==
Oxford University

- 1880 FA Cup Final (runner-up)

== Heir ==
Lord Avebury died unmarried in 1929 at the age of seventy and was succeeded in the Barony by his nephew, John Lubbock.

Peerage of the United Kingdom
Preceded by John Lubbock	Baron Avebury; 1913–1929	Succeeded by John Lubbock
Baronetage of the United Kingdom
Preceded by John Lubbock	Lubbock baronets of Lamas; 1913–1929	Succeeded by John Lubbock
