= John Lubbock, 3rd Baron Avebury =

British peer (1915-1971)

John Lubbock, 3rd Baron Avebury (13 May 1915 – 21 June 1971), was an English hereditary peer and member of the House of Lords.

He was the son of Harold Fox Pitt Lubbock and a grandson of John Lubbock, 1st Baron Avebury. His sister Moyra was married to broadcaster Dorian Williams from 1938 to 1949. He succeeded his uncle, John Lubbock, 2nd Baron Avebury, as Baron Avebury in 1929.

He was married three times:

- 1) Cecily Kathleen Sparrow (24 February 1938; divorced 1943)
- 2) Diana Margaret Mary Westcott (31 July 1946; divorced 1955)
  - One daughter: Emma Rachel Lubbock (born 16 April 1952); married Michael Charles Page (23 July 1977)
    - Two granddaughters: Sophie Page (born 1982) and Natasha Diana Page (born 1984)
- 3) Betty Gay Ingham (22 December 1955, died 2005)

Lord Avebury died in 1971, aged 56, was buried with an “elaborate memorial” in St. Giles Church yard, and was succeeded by his first cousin Eric Lubbock.

Peerage of the United Kingdom
Preceded by John Lubbock	Baron Avebury; 1929–1971; Member of the House of Lords (1929–1971)	Succeeded by Eric Lubbock
Baronetage of the United Kingdom
Preceded by John Lubbock	Lubbock baronets of Lamas; 1929–1971	Succeeded by Eric Lubbock
