= Sir John Lubbock, 2nd Baronet =

English banker, politician

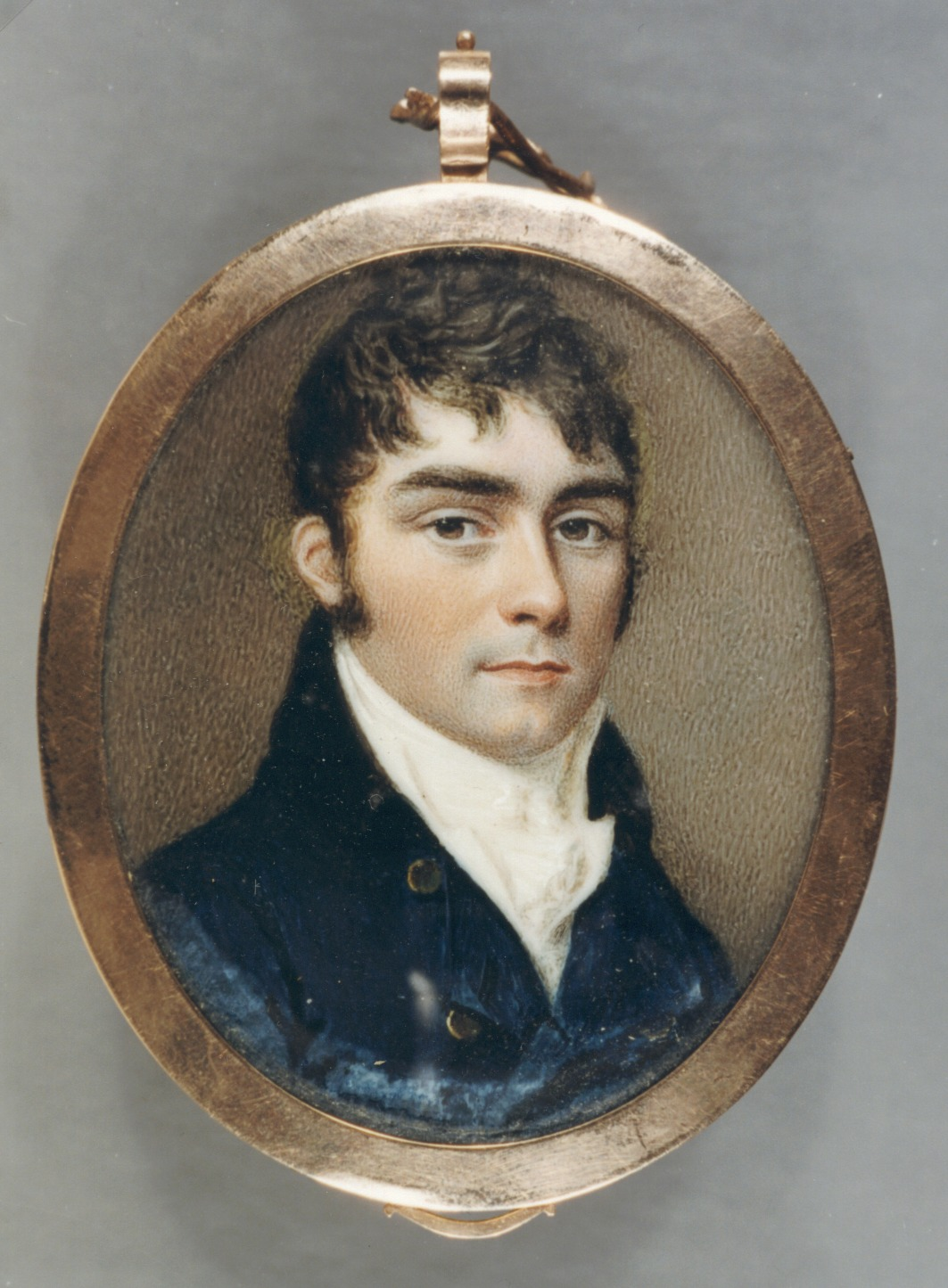
Oval portrait miniature of John William Lubbock, 2nd Baronet

Sir John William Lubbock, 2nd Baronet FRS (baptised 26 August 1774 – died 22 October 1840), was an English banker.

Born on 27 December 1773, as the only surviving son of William Lubbock of Lamas, Norfolk, and Anne Woodrow, daughter of Thomas Woodrow of Hobis, Norfolk. He was educated in Charterhouse, 1786–91. On 1 August 1799, he married Mary Entwistle, daughter of James Entwistle, merchant, of Rusholme, Manchester, Lancashire. His uncle and mentor was Sir John Lubbock, the 1st Baronet, who in 1772 became a partner in the London bank of Lemon, Buller, Finlay and Lubbock, first at No 14 Abchurch Lane, then of Mansion House Street. In 1785 the partnership changed to Forster, Lubbock and Bosanquet, and in 1801 to Forster, Lubbock, Forster and Clarke. Finally in 1814 it was Lubbock & Co., of which John William Lubbock, the principal's nephew, became the second partner. He succeeded his uncle to the baronetage upon the latter's death on 24 February 1816.

Lubbock chaired the family bank Lubbock & Company. He was ultimately succeeded by his son John William Lubbock (FRS 1829), who later oversaw the merger in 1860 of Lubbock & Co. with Roberts & Co., becoming Roberts, Lubbock & Company.

Lubbock was the Member of Parliament (MP) for Leominster from 1812 to 1820. He was grandfather of John Lubbock, 1st Baron Avebury, and great-grandfather of Basil Lubbock.

Parliament of the United Kingdom
Preceded by Sir John Lubbock, 1st Baronet; Henry Bonham	Member of Parliament for Leominster; 1812–1820; With: John Harcourt 1812–1818; Sir William Cuningham-Fairlie 1818–1819; John Harcourt 1819–1820	Succeeded by The Lord Hotham; Sir William Cuningham-Fairlie
Baronetage of the United Kingdom
Preceded by John Lubbock	Baronet of Lamas; 1816–1840	Succeeded by John Lubbock
