= Halvergate =

Village in Norfolk, England

Coordinates: 52.607°N 1.579°E

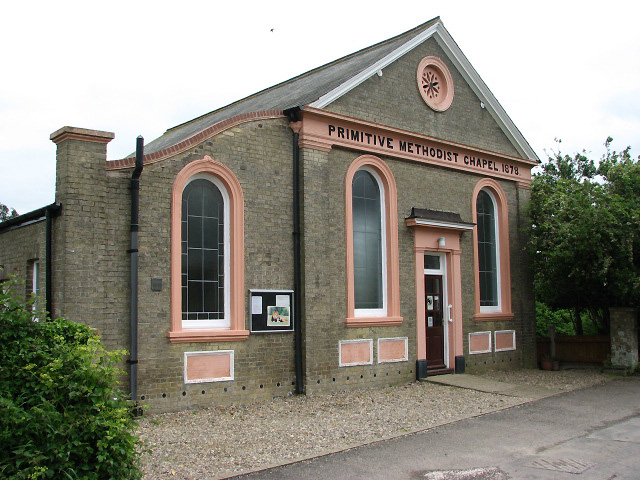
- Primitive Methodist Chapel, Halvergate

- Location within Norfolk
- Area: 9.49 sq mi (24.6 km^{2})
- Population: 585 (2021 census)
  - Density: 62/sq mi (24/km^{2})
- OS grid reference: TG424070
- Civil parish: Halvergate
- District: Broadland
- Shire county: Norfolk
- Region: East
- Country: England
- Sovereign state: United Kingdom
- Post town: NORWICH
- Postcode district: NR13
- Dialling code: 01493
- Police: Norfolk
- Fire: Norfolk
- Ambulance: East of England
- UK Parliament: Broadland and Fakenham

Halvergate is a village and civil parish in the English county of Norfolk, between the Rivers Bure and Yare. The civil parish also includes the hamlet of Tunstall.

Halvergate is located 2.8 miles (4.5 km) south-east of Acle and 12 miles (19 km) east of Norwich.

== History ==
Halvergate's name is of Anglo-Saxon origin and derives from the Old English for the land costing half a heriot (a death duty of military equipment).

In the Domesday Book of 1086, Halvergate is listed as a settlement of 69 households hundred of Walshamshire. In 1086, the village was part of the East Anglian estates of King William I.

Halvergate Hall was built in 1840 for Sir Cyrus Gillet.

In 1944, a Consolidated B-24 Liberator of the 466th Bombardment Group crashed in the parish after taking-off from RAF Attlebridge, killing all of its crew. A group of enthusiasts excavated the wreck in 1979 and were startled to discover the bomb load still in place.

== Geography ==
According to the 2021 census, Halvergate has a population of 585 people which shows a decrease from the 907 people recorded in the 2011 census.

Halvergate is within The Broads National Park and is close to Halvergate Marshes, a Site of Special Scientific Interest. The Weavers' Way footpath passes through the village.

== Church of St. Peter & St. Paul ==
Halvergate's parish church is dedicated to Saint Peter and Saint Paul and dates from the Fifteenth Century. The church is located within the village on 'The Street' and has been Grade I listed since 1962. St. Peter & St. Paul's is no longer open for Sunday services.

The church was renovated several times during the Victorian era, most notably in the 1870s by Richard Phipson. Despite this, there is still some surviving Fifteenth Century stained-glass windows.

== Windmills ==
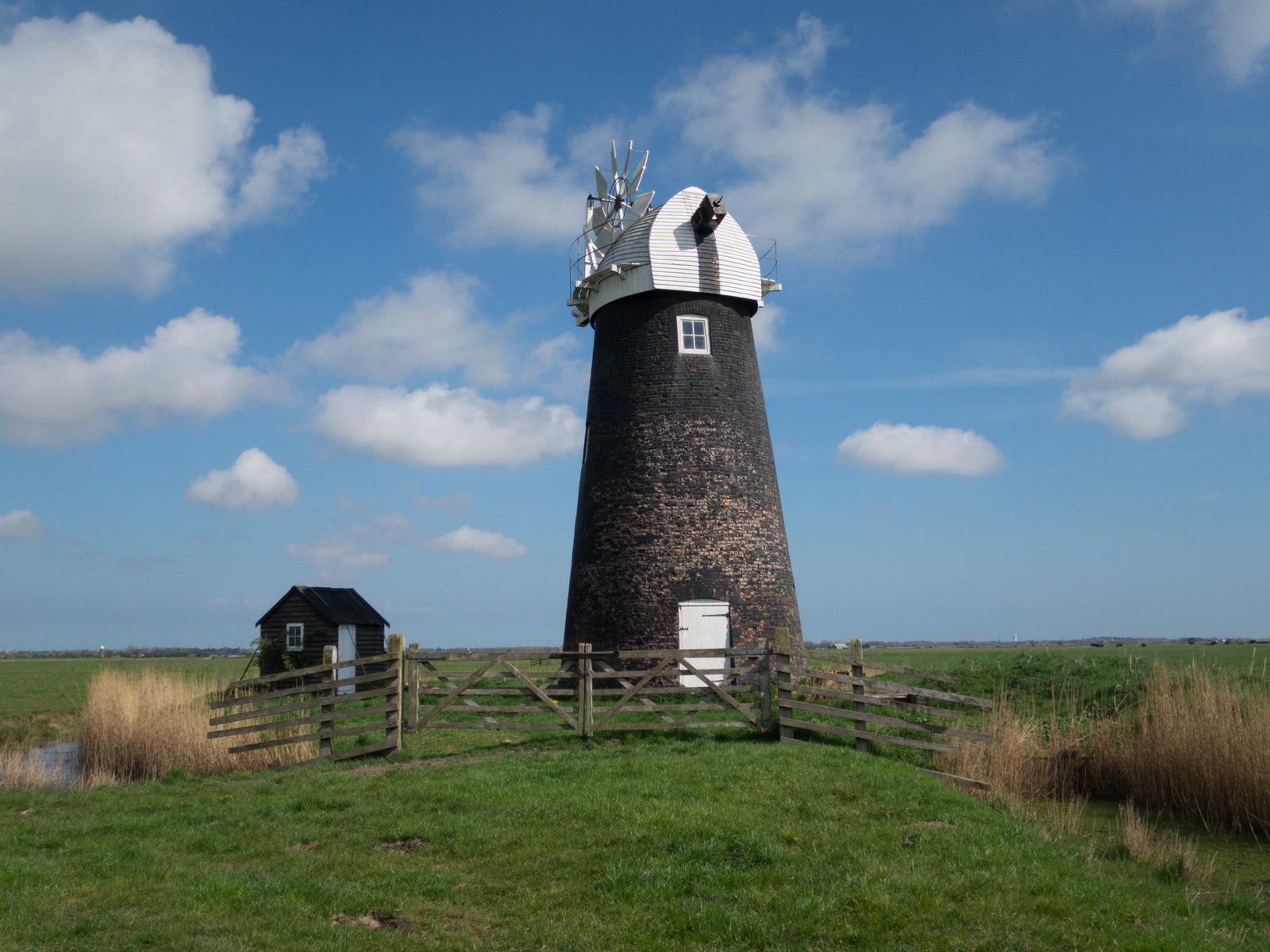
Howard's Mill

Halvergate has several windmills. One is a corn mill, the others are drainage mills.

- Halvergate Windmill was a post mill standing in 1743. It was replaced by a tower mill in 1866, which was destroyed by fire in 1935. The tower survives.
- High's Mill is a tower mill built in the early 19th century. It has been conserved.
- Howard's Mill is a tower mill built in the mid 19th century. It has been restored.
- Key's Mill is a tower mill built in the 1700s. It has been conserved.
- Mutton's Mill is a tower mill built c.1830. It has been restored.
- Six Mile House Mill is a tower mill built in the 19th century. It has been conserved.
- Stone's Mill is a tower mill built in the mid 19th century. It is derelict.

== Amenities ==
Acle & Halvergate Cricket Club play home games at the Queen Elizabeth II Playing Fields close to the village. The club operates several teams including a youth setup with the First XI playing in the Premier Division of the Norfolk Cricket Alliance.

The Red Lion Pub has been open in the village since at least 1789. The pub remains open.

== Governance ==
Halvergate is part of the electoral ward of Marshes for local elections and is part of the district of Broadland.

The village's national constituency is Broadland and Fakenham which has been represented by the Conservative Party's Jerome Mayhew MP since 2019.
