= Booton, Norfolk =

Village in Norfolk, England

Coordinates: 52.761°N 1.125°E

Booton
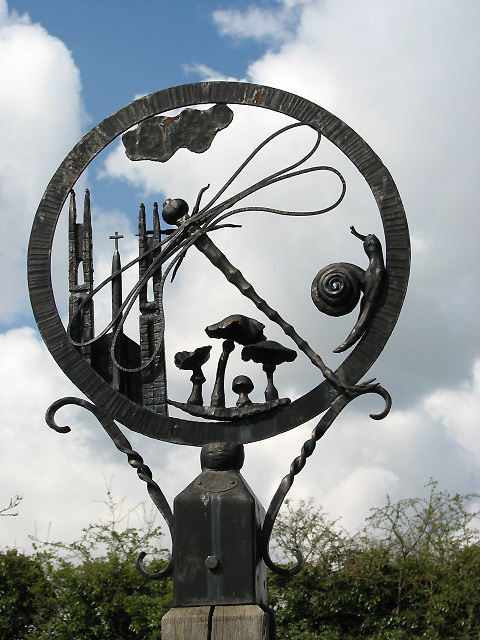
- The village sign, showing its distinctive church towers at left

- Location within Norfolk
- Area: 11.5 km^{2} (4.4 sq mi)
- Population: 216 (2021 census)
  - Density: 19/km^{2} (49/sq mi)
- OS grid reference: TG109228
- Civil parish: Booton
- District: Broadland
- Shire county: Norfolk
- Region: East
- Country: England
- Sovereign state: United Kingdom
- Post town: NORWICH
- Postcode district: NR10
- Police: Norfolk
- Fire: Norfolk
- Ambulance: East of England
- UK Parliament: Broadland and Fakenham

Booton is a village and civil parish in the Broadland district of the English county of Norfolk. It is 1 mile (1.6 km) south-east of Reepham, 6 miles (9.7 km) south-west of Aylsham and 12 miles (19 km) north-west of Norwich.

== History ==
In the Domesday Book, Booton is listed as a settlement of seven households in the hundred of Erpingham. In 1086, the village was part of the estates of Tihel of Hellean.

A postmill was constructed in the village in 1848. It stood until it was largely dismantled in 1900. In 1940, a polygonal bunker was built as part of the defences against a possible invasion of Britain.

== Geography ==
According to the 2021 census, Booton has a population of 216 people which demonstrates an increase from the 196 people listed in the 2011 census.

== Church ==
Booton is dominated by its parish church, dedicated to Saint Michael. St. Michael's was built largely due to enthusiasm of Whitwell Elwin who replaced the much smaller medieval church. The building is Grade I listed.

== Governance ==
Booton is part of the electoral ward of Great Witchingham for local elections and is part of the district of Broadland. It is part of the Broadland and Fakenham parliamentary constituency.

== Notable people ==
- Whitwell Elwin (1816–1900) clergyman and critic, lived in Booton.
- Stephen Fry (b.1957) actor and comedian, grew up in Booton.
