= St Theobald's Church, Great Hautbois =

Church of St Theobald
- Church of the Assumption of St Mary
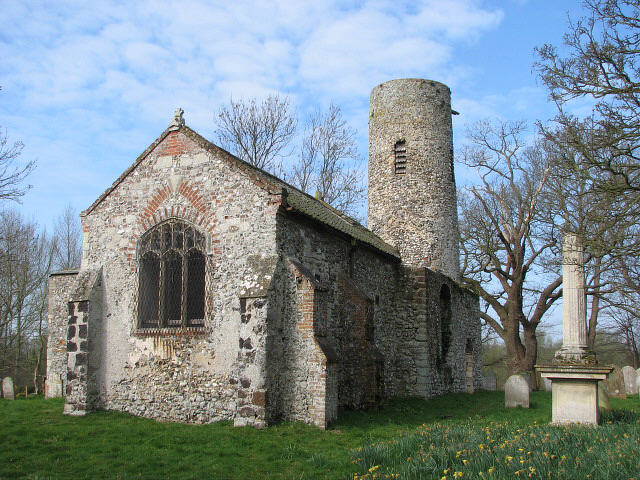
- Viewed from the east
- Church of St Theobald
- 52°44′3.120″N 1°20′54.816″E
- OS grid reference: TG 26163 20432
- Location: Great Hautbois, Norfolk
- Country: England
- Website: coltishallgroupofparishes.wordpress.com

Architecture
- Heritage designation: Grade II*
- Designated: 10 May 1961

St Theobald's Church is a former church at Great Hautbois, near Coltishall in Norfolk, England. During the medieval period it was a place of pilgrimage to a shrine of St Theobald; it remained in use until a new church was built in the 19th century. It is a round-tower church. The building is Grade II* listed, and a scheduled monument.

== Description ==
=== The dedication ===
The dedication of the church was originally to the Assumption of Saint Mary the Virgin; it has later been regarded as dedicated to St Theobald, as described in the History of Norfolk, published by Charles Parkin in the 18th century: "In this church was a famous image of St Theobald, commonly called St Tebbald of Hobbies; it was much frequented for its many pretended miracles, so that pilgrimages used to be made to it.... [I]n 1507 Thomas Wood of Cowteshale gave legacies to the gild of the Virgin Mary, in the church of the Assumption of the Virgin at Hobbies, and to paint the new tabernacle of St Theobald there, and this saint being so famous, made some mistake the dedication of the church, and suppose it to have been dedicated to St Theobald, which is not so."

=== History ===
The church was built in the 11th century, of knapped flint and flint rubble, in Early English style. There was originally an aisleless nave and a chancel. The round tower was built in the 12th century. In the 13th century the chancel was extended and a south transept was added, to house an image of St Theobald. The south aisle, adjoining the transept, and connected to the nave through two arches, was built in the 14th century, perhaps to accommodate pilgrims; a porch was added in the following century.

Associated with the church was the Hospital of St Mary, for pilgrims to the church, founded about 1235 by Sir Peter de Alto Bosco, or Hautbois, who possessed half of the manor of Great Hautbois. After the Dissolution of the Monasteries, when the patronage of the church was granted to the Duke of Norfolk, the church was no longer regarded as a place of pilgrimage.

Holy Trinity Church, designed by Thomas Jeckyll, was built in the village in 1864 to replace this church. It contains the font from the former church. The chancel of St Theobald's was converted into a mortuary chapel, and the rest of the building was left as a ruin; the graveyard remained in use.
