= Lamas, Norfolk =

Village in Norfolk, England

Coordinates: 52.7587°N 1.3277°E

Lamas
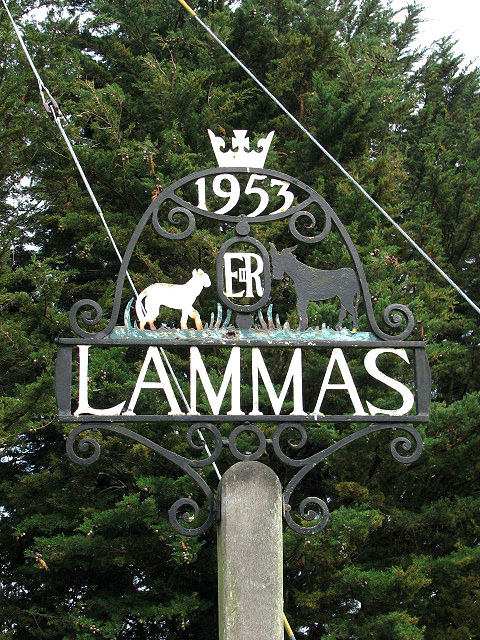
- Lamas village sign

- Location within Norfolk
- Civil parish: Buxton with Lamas
- District: Broadland
- Shire county: Norfolk
- Region: East
- Country: England
- Sovereign state: United Kingdom
- Post town: Norwich
- Postcode district: NR10
- Dialling code: 01603
- UK Parliament: Broadland and Fakenham

Lamas (also spelled Lammas) is a village in Norfolk, England. It lies within the civil parish of Buxton with Lamas. Lamas is located 4.5 miles (7.2 km) south-east of Aylsham and 9.8 miles (15.8 km) north of Norwich, beside the river Bure.

== History ==
Lamas' name is of Anglo-Saxon origin and derives from the Old English for loam marsh.

In the Domesday Book, Lamas is listed as a settlement of three households in the hundred of South Erpingham. In 1086, the village was part of the East Anglian estates of Ralph Beaufour.

Old Lamas Hall was built in the 16th century and is still a private residence, being recently renovated.

Lamas Hall, a separate building, was built in the 17th century and was expanded in the 19th century.

== Governance ==
Lamas is part of the electoral ward of Buxton for local elections and is part of the district of Broadland.

The village's is represented nationally in the Broadland and Fakenham parliamentary constituency, which has been represented by the Conservative Party's Jerome Mayhew MP since 2019.

== St Andrew's Church ==
Lamas' church is dedicated to Saint Andrew and dates from the 14th century. St. Andrew's is located on Mill Road and has been grade II listed since 1961. The church holds Sunday service once a month.

The church was largely rebuilt and extended in 1881; it features a set of royal arms from the reign of Queen Elizabeth II.

== Notable residents ==
- Anna Sewell (1820–1878): novelist, lived in Lamas
- Walter Rye (1843–1929): athlete and antiquary, lived in Lamas.
