= Pinchbeck =

Pinchbeck may refer to:

== Places ==
- Pinchbeck, Lincolnshire, England, UK
- Pinchbeck Engine, a drainage museum nearby

== People ==
- Christopher Pinchbeck (c.1670 – 1732), English watchmaker who developed an eponymous alloy; or his son also named Christopher (1710–1783)
- Daniel Pinchbeck, American author
- Emma Pinchbeck, CEO of Energy UK
- Ivy Pinchbeck, economic historian
- William Pinchbeck, American pioneer

== Other ==
- Pinchbeck (alloy), an alloy made of copper and zinc

== See also ==
- Pinchback
- Pinch (disambiguation)
- Back (disambiguation)
