= Pinch point =

Pinch point may refer to:

- Pinch point (economics), the level of inventories of a commodity or product below which consumers become concerned about security of supply
- Pinch point (mathematics), a type of singular point on an algebraic surface
- Pinch point bar, a hand tool consisting of a long, straight metal bar
- Curb extension, a traffic calming measure consisting of an angled narrowing of the roadway
- The point of closest approach between the hot and cold composite curves in pinch analysis
- Pinch point hazard, a mechanical hazard produced by objects coming together.

== See also ==
- Bottleneck (disambiguation), various meanings including a phenomenon where the performance or capacity of a system is limited by one component or resource
- Pinch (disambiguation)
