= Pinch =

Pinch or pinching may refer to:

- Pinch (action), to grip an object or substance between two fingers.
- Pinch (unit), a very small amount of an ingredient, typically salt or a spice
- Pinch (whisky) or Haig's Pinch, brand of Scotch whisky
- Pinch, Indiana, an unincorporated community
- Pinch, West Virginia, a census-designated place in Kanawha County

== Mathematics and science ==
- Pinch (plasma physics), the compression of a plasma filament by magnetic forces, or a device which uses this effect for magnetic fusion energy
- Pinching is a multi-touch gesture, done by squeezing one's fingers on a touchscreen
- Pinch point (economics), the level of inventory below which consumers become concerned about security of supply
- Pinch point (mathematics), a type of singular point on an algebraic surface
- Pinch analysis, a methodology for minimising energy consumption of chemical processes

== Arts and culture ==
- The Pinch, a literary journal published at University of Memphis
- Pinched, a 1917 film starring Harold Lloyd
- A puppet voiced and operated by Bill Schulz on Red Eye w/Greg Gutfeld
- Tom Pinch and Ruth Pinch, characters in the novel Martin Chuzzlewit by Charles Dickens
- Pinch Raccoon, a character from "PB&J Otter"
- Doctor Pinch, character in The Comedy of Errors by William Shakespeare
- Pinch (film), a 2019 animated short film by Diego Maclean

== People ==
- Pinch (drummer) (born Andrew Pinching, born 1965), drummer for punk band The Damned
- Pinch (dubstep musician) (born Rob Ellis, born 1980), electronic musician who produces dubstep
- Colin Pinch (1921–2006), Australian cricketer
- John Pinch the elder (1769–1827), British architect in Bath
- John Pinch the younger (1796–1849), British architect in Bath
- Trevor Pinch (1952–2021), British sociologist at Cornell University
- Frank Pinch (1891–1961), English cricketer
- William Pinch (1940–2021), mineralogist from Rochester, New York
- Evelyn Pinching (1915–1988), British alpine skier
- William Wyatt Pinching (1851–1878), rugby union international who represented England in 1872
- Pinch Thomas (1888–1953), backup catcher in Major League Baseball

== Sports ==
- Pinch hitter (baseball), a substitute batter
- Pinch hitter (cricket), a batsman (not a substitute) promoted up the batting order
- Pinch runner, a baseball player substituted for a player on base

== See also ==
- John Pinch (disambiguation)
- Pinch point (disambiguation)
