= Pinch point hazard =

Mechanical hazard which may damage or injure by reducing a gap

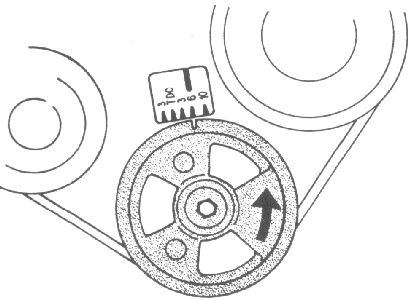
Pinch point hazards may be present with pulleys. As an example, fingers can get caught between the moving belt and the pulley wheel.

A pinch point or pinch point hazard is a common class of mechanical hazard where injury or damage may be done by one or more objects moving towards each other, crushing or shearing whatever comes between them. A nip point is a type of pinch point involving rotating objects, such as gears and pulleys. Injuries can range from minor such as blisters to severe like amputations and fatalities. Examples of pinch point hazards include gaps in closing doors and objects swinging or being lowered near fixed objects.

== Common causes of injuries ==
- Poor situational awareness
- Proximity to mobile equipment and fixed structures
- Loose clothing, hair or jewelry getting caught in rotating parts or equipment
- Inadequate/missing safety barriers or machine guarding
- Handling errors
- Wrong work procedures or tools
- Reaching into moving equipment

The NIOSH Hierarchy of Controls.

== Safety controls ==
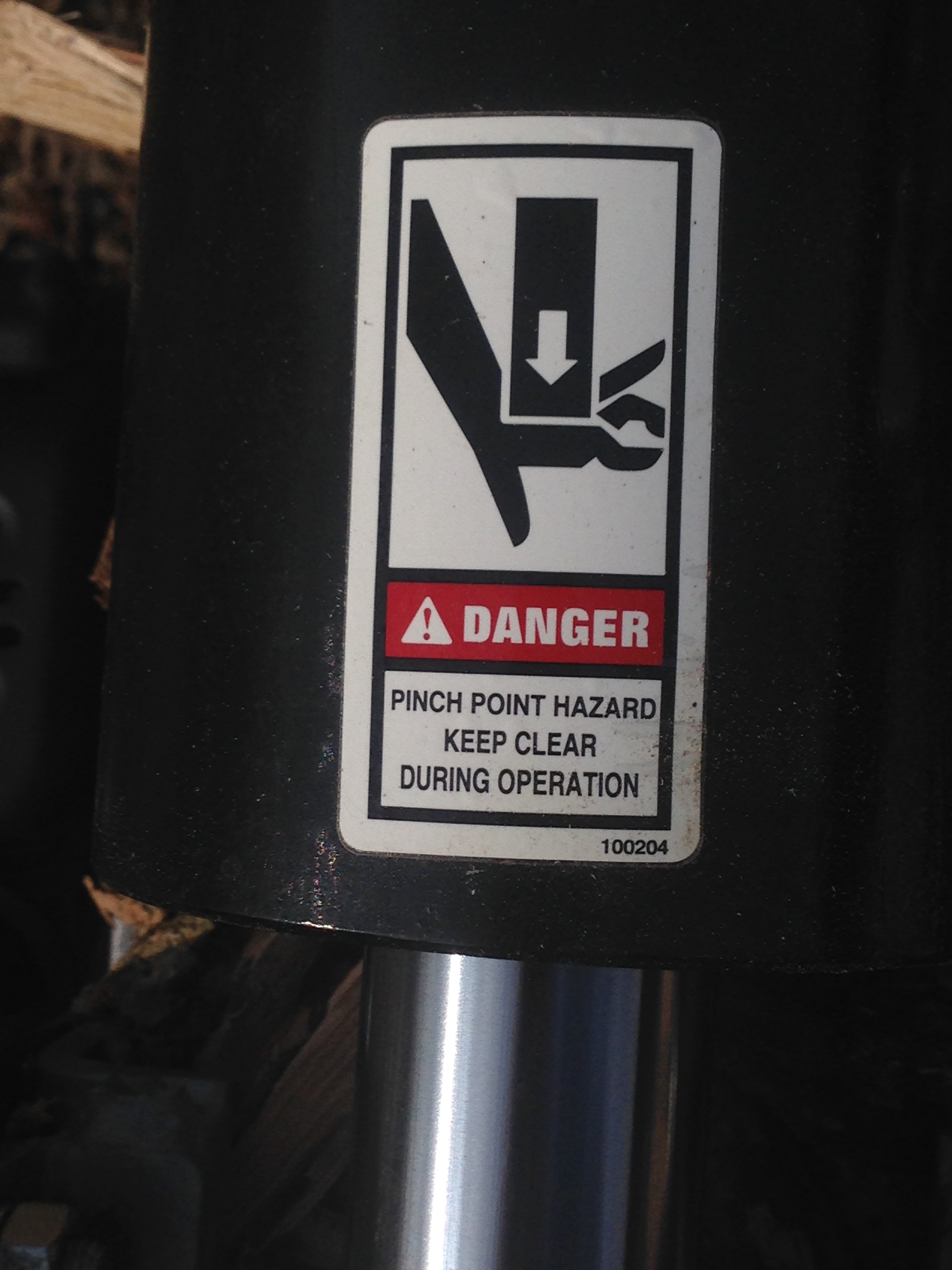
A hazard sign is an example of an administrative control

Pre-work hazard inspections can be performed to identify pinch point hazards. These hazards can be managed with control methods, listed below according to the hazard control hierarchy. The hazard control hierarchy was created by the National Institute of Occupational Safety and Health (NIOSH).

Engineering controls physically prevent objects from entering the pinch point. These are systems and devices designed (Engineered) that cover pinch point hazards to limit worker exposure. The shape and coverage of engineering controls to protect against pinch points varies with the machine involved. Rotating parts including rollers, chains, gears/sprockets, drives, and conveyors all pose pinch points and can be found across many industries.

- Barriers and machine guards

Administrative controls inform worker behavior to avoid pinch points. These are controls implemented to regulate how people perform work. This includes awareness training, practice, scheduling of shifts, and teaching how to (and how not to) perform tasks. In the context of pinch points, this is often done through pinch point awareness training and labeling. The training serves to educate workers on the pinch hazard around them and how they can work safely around them. The labels are placed on the machines near the point of operation to remind workers of the hazards found.

- Area demarcation
- Lockout–tagout
- Situational awareness
- Use of appropriate training, work procedures, instructions, and operating manuals

Personal protective equipment (Known as PPE) protects individuals exposed to a hazard by wearing garments to cover parts of their body exposed to the hazard. While PPE should not be solely utilized to protect against pinch hazards, certain types of gloves are worn. Gloves for pinch hazards often include cut and impact-resistant gloves.

== Signage and labeling ==
In the U.S., the Occupational Safety and Health Administration regulates accident preventions signs under 29 CFR 1910.145. This standard sets requirements of signage including design and features, Classifications, types of signage, and others. With this, signs are required to have "Signal Words", key terms used to directly and correctly identify the hazard present.

The signal word "Pinch point" is required to be posted on a label when a piece of equipment or machinery has parts that move in opposite directions or move towards a fixed object. This label should meet the following criteria in order to be considered effective:

1. Must be visible and easy to understand using simple fonts and bright colors to attract attention.
2. Must be direct and clear in its wording. Phrases like "Keep hands away" or "Pinch Point Hazard" are common, though other wording is acceptable.
3. Based on guidance from 29 CFR 1910.145, the signage must indicate a level of danger. "DANGER", "CAUTION", or "WARNING" are common key words impact-resistant machines pinch point hazard.
  An example of an ISO pinch point label.

The International Standards Organization (ISO) details the hazard of pinch points and signage requirements under "ISO 13857: Safety of machinery — Safety distances to prevent hazard zones being reached by upper and lower limbs". This standard, similar to 29 CFR 1910.145, details machine and equipment design as it relates to worker proximity. Measurements are taken to quantify where the worker's limbs are located relative to the machine's point of operation. These measurements are then taken into consideration as controls are implemented to ensure that the worker's limbs are sufficiently distant as per the standard.

== Machinery Point of Operation and Guarding ==
The point of operation of a machine is where the work is performed by it. OSHA details that there are 4 main operations that can be performed under 29CFR 1910. 212. Forming, Shaping, Cutting, and Boring make up these categories. Each machine requires its own machine guarding to sufficiently protect against pinch point hazards.

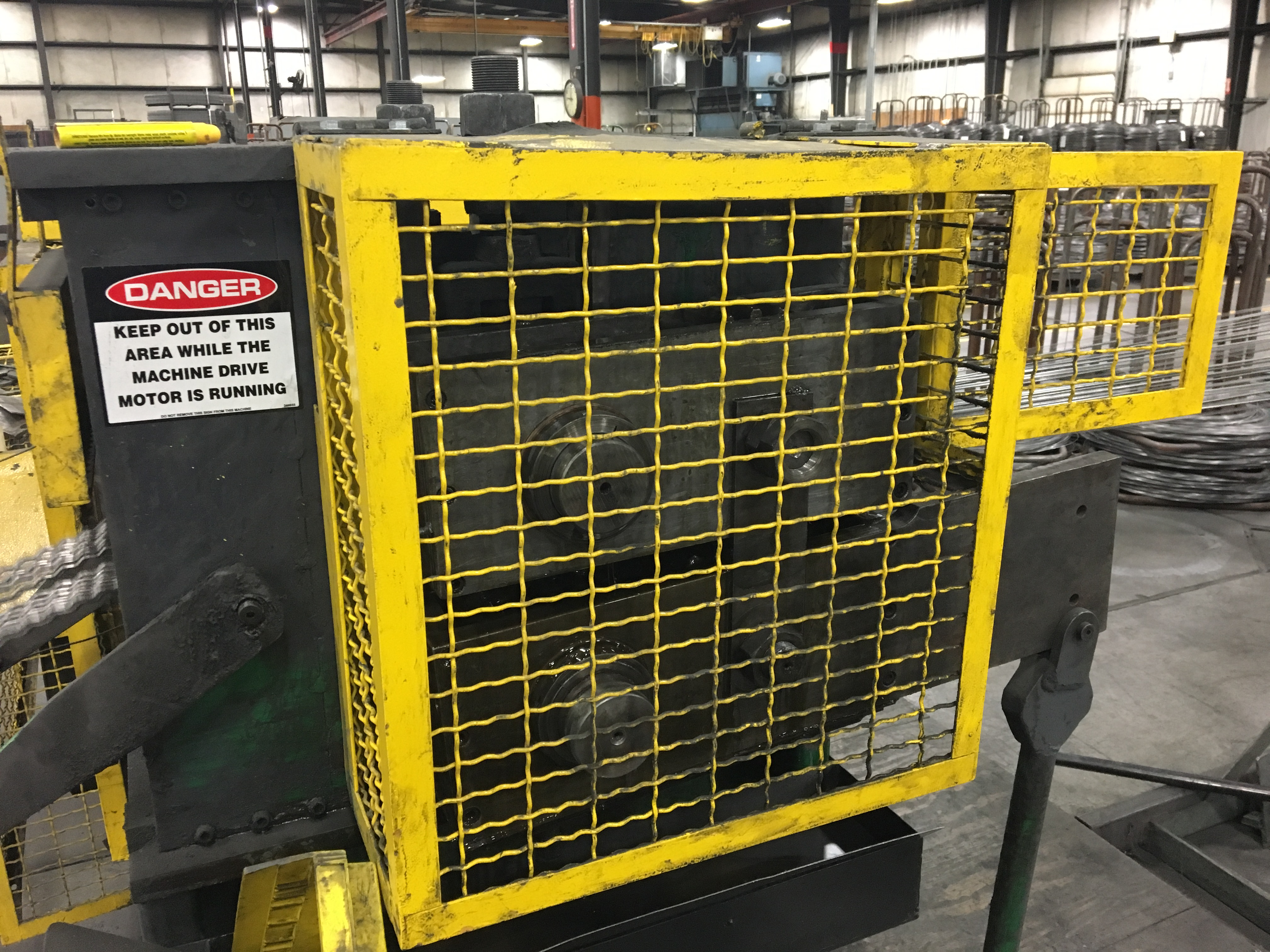
An example of machine guarding using the AUTO method.

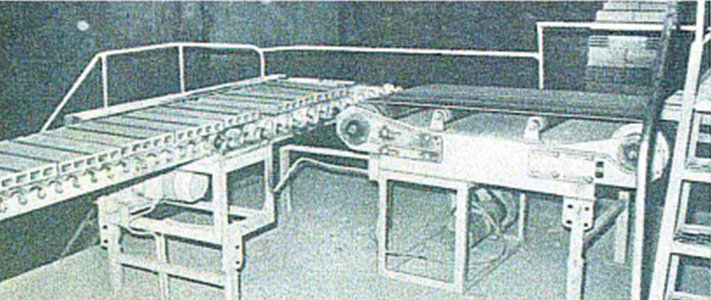
An example of an older conveyor without guarding.

To accomplish this, the "AUTO" method is often used. referring to. The word "AUTO" is an acronym containing four parts as requirements for machine guarding. These four parts include "Around", "Under", "Through", and "Over". "Around" details the ability for a worker to reach easily around the guarding implemented, exposing them to the hazard. "Under" is regarding the ability for a worker to reach underneath a guard, exposing to the hazard. "Through" describes the if a worker is able to reach through a guard, exposing them to the hazard. "Over" is the opposite of "Under", being able to reach over the guard.`

== Rollers and Conveyors ==
Rollers are devices used across industries to move material with minimal rolling resistance. They are often idle, denoting that they do not utilize an external power source to spin them, rather rely on gravity or the energy from a separate power source. The shape, size, and purpose of rollers varies with each industry. Other example of rollers that pose pinch hazards include the following:

-Delivery rollers (At the end of the belt to place material at its destination)

-Loop rollers

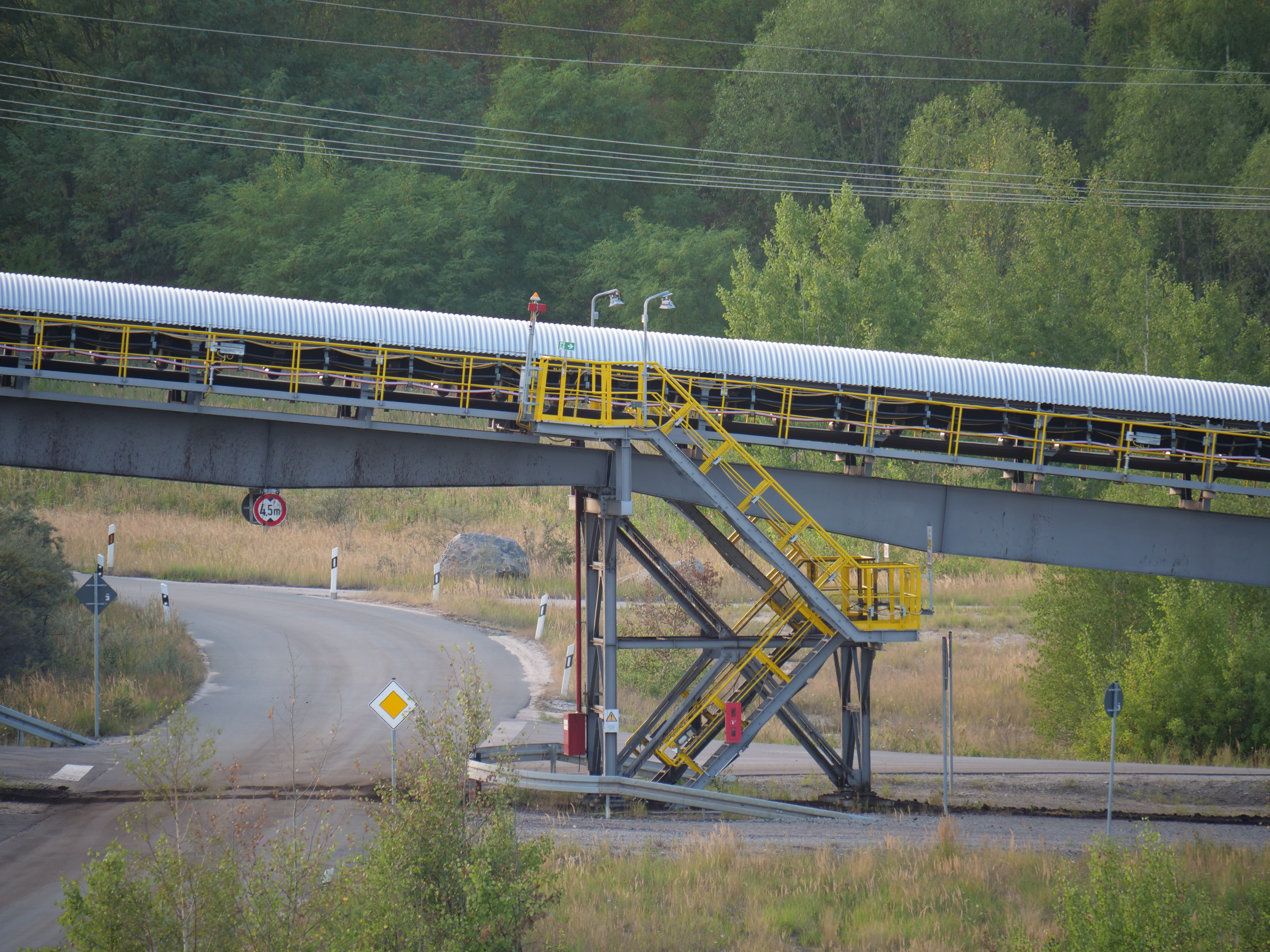
An example of a modern conveyor with guarding.

-Return rollers (Support belts from underneath)

-Deflection rollers (Change elevation of belts or material)

-Drive rollers (Powered by an external source)

They are often seen in the mining industry on conveyor belts to guide rocks and minerals around facilities. Each conveyor and roller assembly varies in size and complexity with the operation. The hazard associated with them stems from where the surfaces contact each other. To prevent contact between a worker and the exposed parts, controls are implemented to separate a worker from the point of operation.

Roller and conveyors are often an "In-running" nip point, indicating that the components rotate in opposing directions with their axes running parallel to each other.

== See also ==
- Hazard – Situation or object that can cause harm
- Mechanical hazard- Hazard with a mechanical energy source
- Occupational hazard – Hazard experienced in the workplace
- Physical hazard – Hazard due to a physical agent
