= Stretham Old Engine =

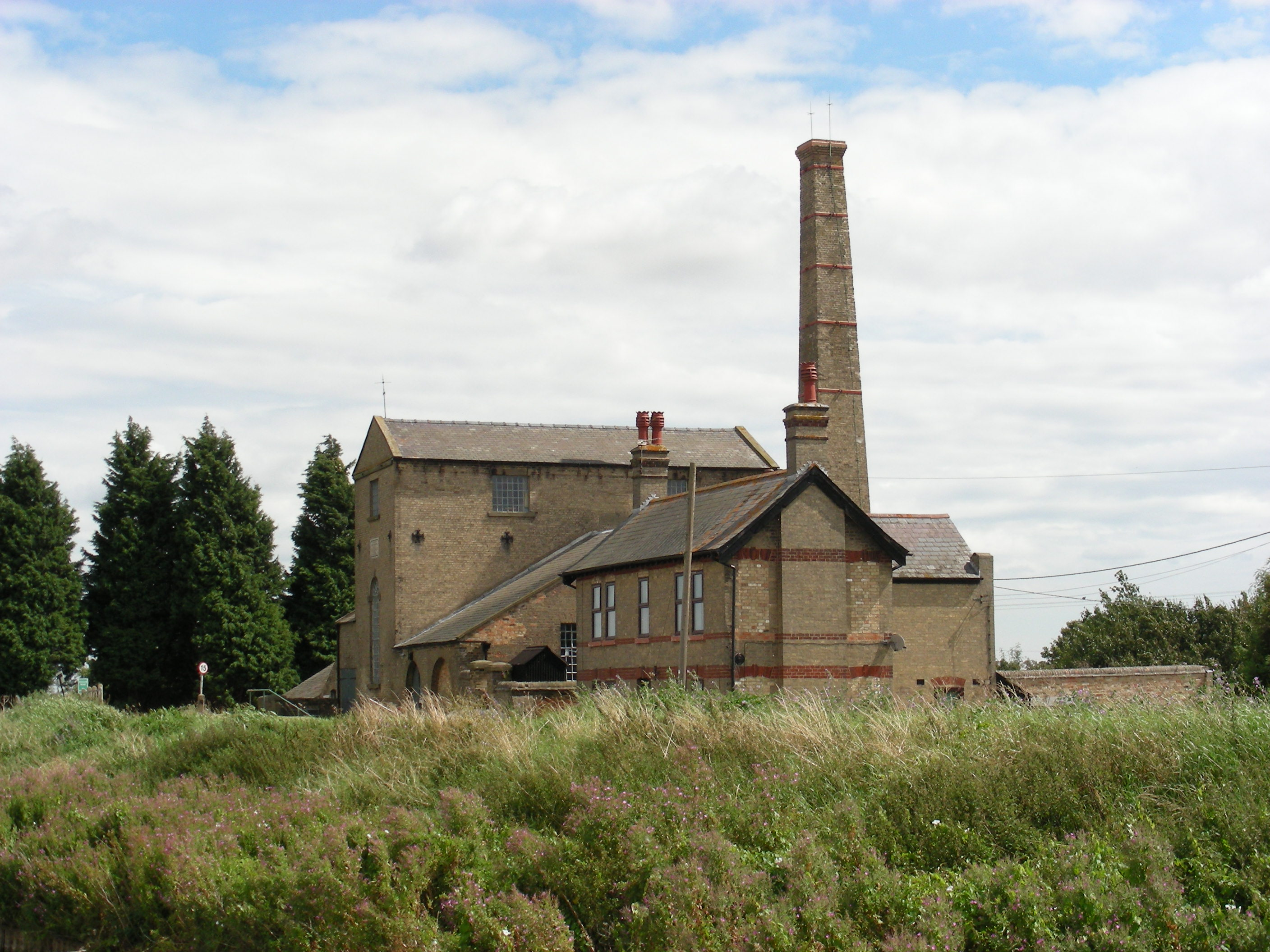

- Location within Cambridgeshire
- 52°20′03″N 0°13′28″E
- Location: Stretham

History
- Built: 1831

Site notes
- Area: Cambridgeshire

Listed Building – Grade II*
- Official name: Old Engine House
- Designated: 13 May 1988
- Reference no.: 1127031

Stretham Old Engine is a steam-powered engine just south of Stretham in Cambridgeshire, England, that was used to pump water from flood-affected areas of The Fens back into the River Great Ouse. It is one of only three surviving drainage engines in East Anglia, and is a Grade II* listed building.

== History ==
During the 17th century, large areas of fenland in East Anglia were reclaimed via extensive draining schemes. Despite this, crops and livestock were frequently swept away by widescale flooding as the land sank because of the drainage. As a partial solution, windpumps were used to pump water away from flood-affected areas, but relied on the weather and lacked the power required to lift large quantities of water. Wicken Fen nature reserve has a preserved and restored windpump, used to manage the water table in the Fen. The advent of steam power in the late 18th century offered a new solution, and these new engines began to spring up around The Fens.

== Steam engine ==
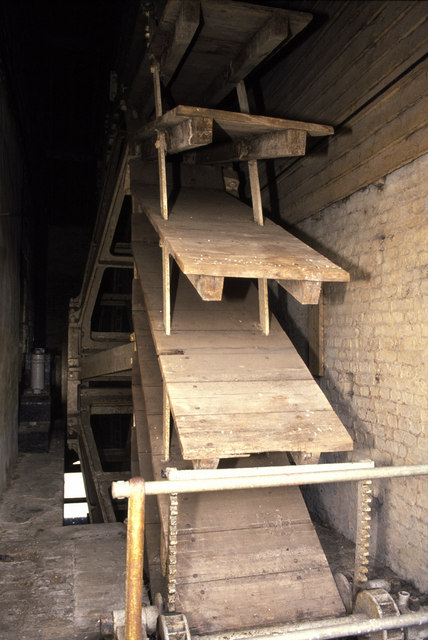
Scoop wheel of the Stretham Old Engine

The steam engine on the Old West River (Great Ouse) just south of Stretham was built by the Butterley Company of Derbyshire in 1831, at a cost of £4950. It replaced four nearby windmills and its scoop wheel was used successfully for over a century to lift water from flood channels back into the river. Powered by coal that was brought by barge, it consumed a ton of fuel every four hours.

The rotative beam engine is of the double-acting type with a beam of 24 feet 8 inches (7.52 m) and a flywheel 24 feet (7.3 m) in diameter. The scoop wheel it drives has been successively enlarged as the level of the fens has shrunk: the first wheel was 29 feet (8.8 m), increased to 33 feet (10 m) in 1850 and to 37 feet 2 inches (11.33 m) in 1896 and lifted 120-150 tons of water per minute.

During use, the engine needed constant supervision, with the stoker and superintendent on 24-hour call. One superintendent even installed a telescope in his window so he could supervise the workmen without the need to get his feet wet.

== Replacement ==
In 1924, the installation of a Mirrlees diesel engine saw the steam engine relegated to 'standby', and the last serious use was during the floods of 1939 and 1940. Prickwillow Museum contains a nearly identical Mirrlees diesel engine that has been preserved and restored to working order. The pumping station was later replaced with five smaller, more efficient, electrical pumps that drain into the River Cam and are still in use.

== Public opening ==
The engine is open to the public on Sunday afternoons and Bank Holidays from the beginning of April to the end of October between 1.00pm and 5.00pm.

== Picture gallery ==
Interior views
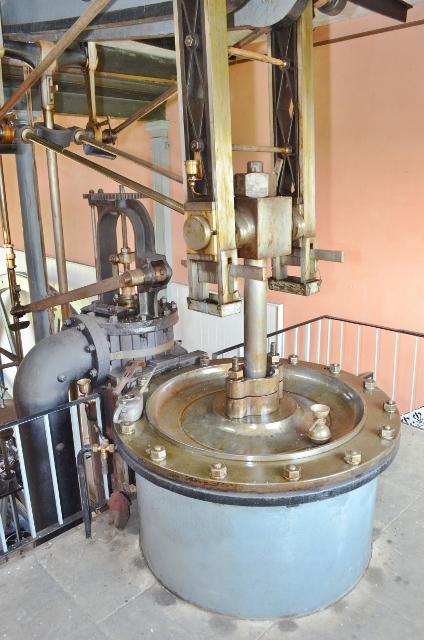
Main cylinder head (foreground); valve cylinder (background); machine hall and flywheel

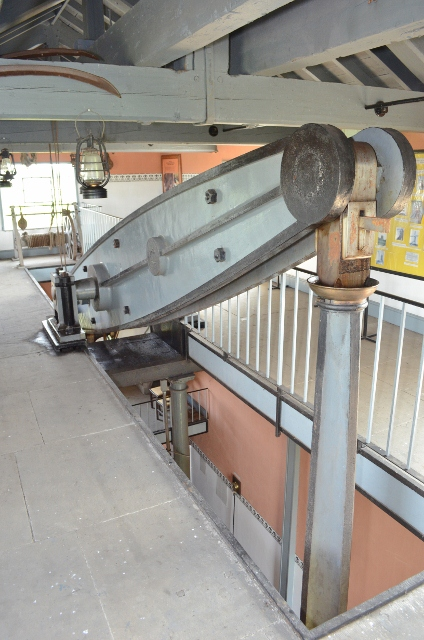
The beam in the beam room. The beam room also acts as a museum.

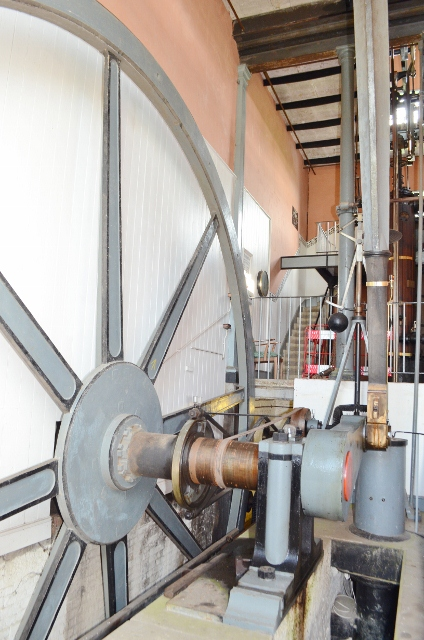
View of the engine

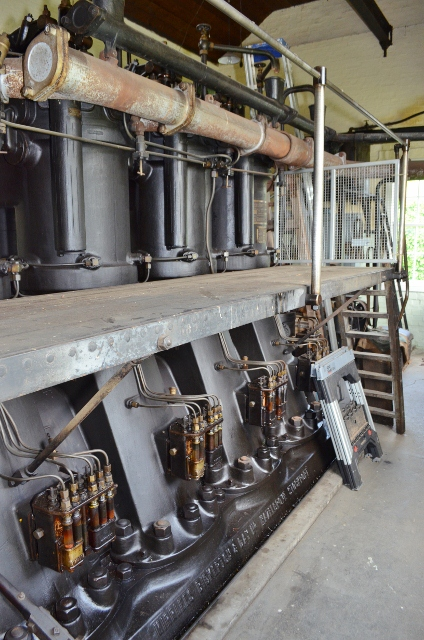
1925 Mirrlees diesel

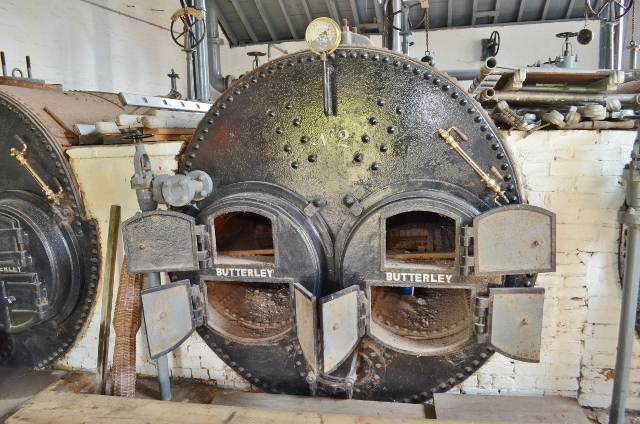
Butterley Co. boilers

== See also ==
- Pinchbeck Engine
- Dogdyke Pumping Station
