= Pinchbeck, Lincolnshire =

Village and civil parish in the South Holland district of Lincolnshire, England

Coordinates: 52.8147°N 0.1605°W

Pinchbeck
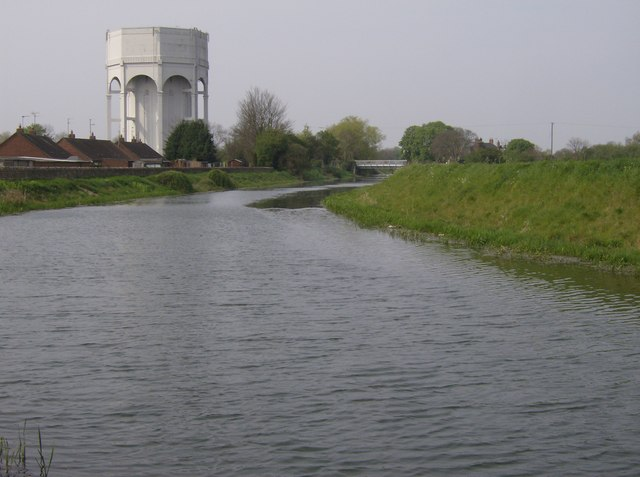
- Water tower and bridge

- Location within Lincolnshire
- Population: 6,011 (2021)
- OS grid reference: TF240255
  - London: 90 mi (140 km) S
- Civil parish: Pinchbeck
- District: South Holland
- Shire county: Lincolnshire
- Region: East Midlands
- Country: England
- Sovereign state: United Kingdom
- Post town: SPALDING
- Postcode district: PE11
- Dialling code: 01775
- Police: Lincolnshire
- Fire: Lincolnshire
- Ambulance: East Midlands
- UK Parliament: South Holland and The Deepings

Pinchbeck is a village and civil parish in the South Holland district of Lincolnshire, England. The civil parish population was 5,153 at the 2001 census, 5,455 at the 2011 census and 6,011 at the 2021 census. It is situated 2 miles (3.2 km) north from the centre of Spalding.

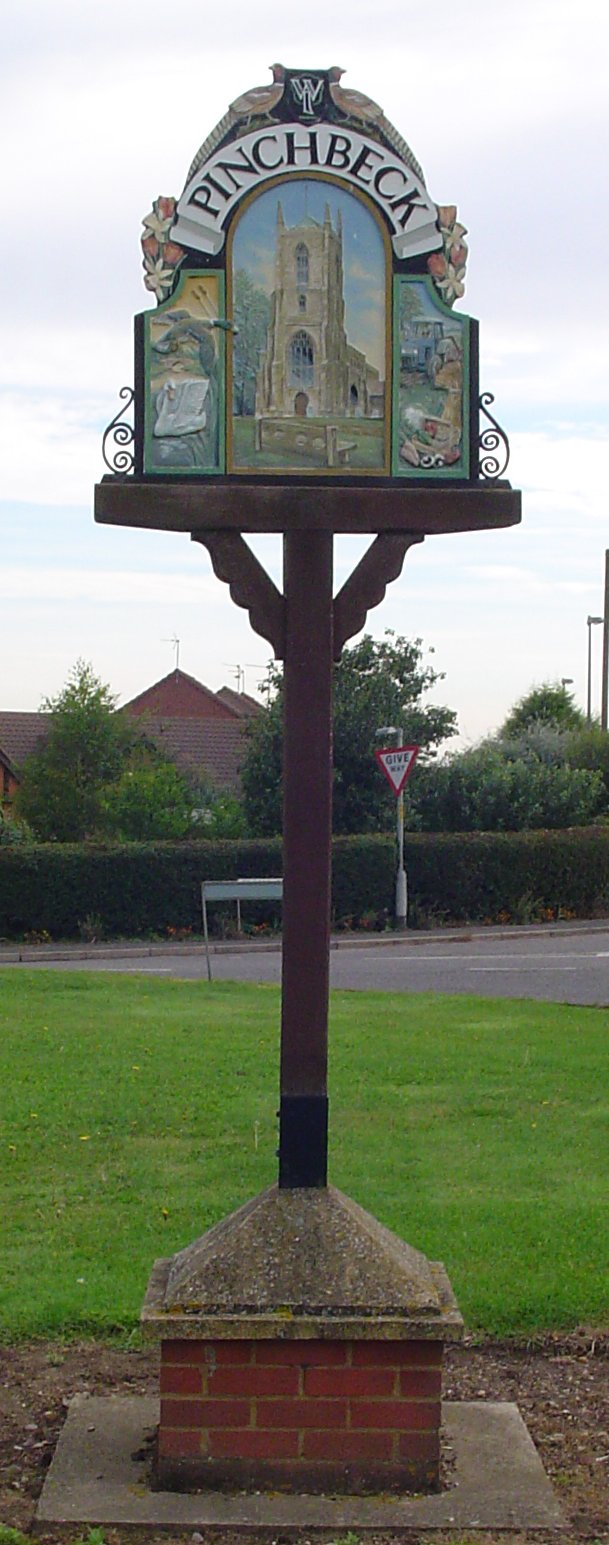
Village sign in Pinchbeck

The name Pinchbeck is likely derived from Old English pinc "minnow" + Old Norse bekkr "stream". A family long associated with the area took its name from the village, one member of which was Christopher Pinchbeck, a watchmaker responsible for the invention of the Pinchbeck alloy, which was once used for imitating gold in cheap jewellery.

The Church of England parish church is dedicated to Saint Mary, and is around 900 years old. It has a wide nave with mid-12th-century arches, and a 15th-century single hammer-beam roof supported by large gilded angels carrying the heraldic escutcheons of the Pinchbeck family. The chancel is by restorer Herbert Butterfield. St Mary's Church is a Grade I listed building.

Village schools are Pinchbeck East C of E School Primary School and Pinchbeck West St Bartholomew's C of E Primary School.

== Pinchbeck Marsh ==
Pinchbeck falls within the drainage area of the Welland and Deepings Internal Drainage Board. The board maintains Pinchbeck Engine House, a museum which houses a drain engine, built to drain Pinchbeck Marsh in the early 19th century.

The marsh is also the location of the highest point in the Parts of Holland, an historic division of Lincolnshire. At only 8 metres above sea level, the high point at TF27872860 is the lowest of those listed for the historic counties and subdivisions in 1964. Visiting this lowest peak near Vernatt's Drain is of interest to participants in the pastime of hill bagging and highpointing.

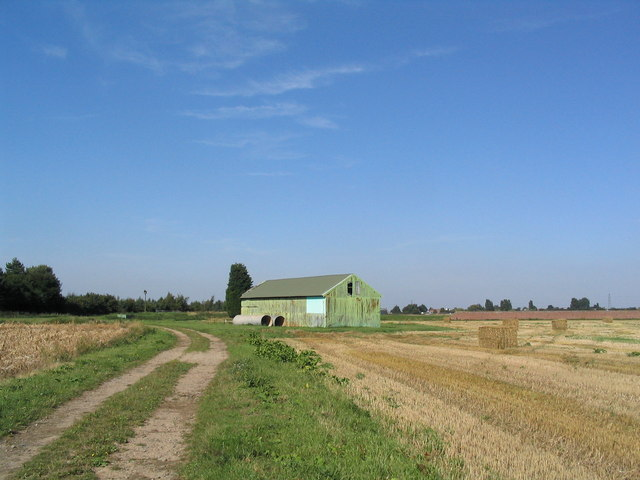
A view across Pinchbeck Marsh

== Parish ==
There is a parish council, the lowest tier of local government. It has 15 members, 13 of whom are elected to represent Pinchbeck ward and two of whom represent Crossgate ward.

Kelly's Directory for Lincolnshire, 1896, records that the Pinchbeck civil parish included the hamlets of Crossgate (half a mile north of the village), Cuckoo Bridge (5 miles S), Guthram Cote (4 miles SW; Guthram Gowt on 2025 Ordnance Survey mapping), Mill Green (2 miles SW), Money Bridge (2 miles W), and Pode Hole (4 miles SW).

== Freedom of the parish ==
The following people and military units have received the freedom of the parish of Pinchbeck.

=== Individuals ===
- Maurice Chappell: MBE: 11 November 2019.
