= Partnerized inventory management =

Partner-optimized inventory management, also known as partnerized inventory management or sometimes just the abbreviation PIM, is an inventory management technique or model often used in deterministic inventory systems in which a significant portion of the total inventory regularly becomes stochastic in nature, due to slowing and/or low demand such as is typical in heavy machinery and construction equipment where the products themselves are extremely durable and have long lives in the field. Inventory in these cases needs to be maintained for an extended time to allow for repairs and product support perhaps as much as two or more decades after a manufacturer has ceased production.

Traditional inventory management techniques break down in cases where a manufacturer maintains inventory to supply future maintenance of their in-service equipment. As demand for goods approaches zero, liquidation of inventory is indicated in most revenue management models. Zero inventory to service products in the field, however, fails the organization in other business areas. Possible costs to manufacture replacement inventory and the harder-to-calculate costs of customer confidence erosion can be greater over time than the immediate financial concerns that are remedied by liquidating inventory entirely by scrapping or discarding it as waste.

While scrapping returns inventory to a state of raw materials, Partner-Optimized Inventory Management (PIM) returns inventory to the market as intermediate goods to be used in production of other goods or non-capital spare parts. An organization that uses the PIM model mitigates the immediate pinch point caused by inventory reduction by retaining as-needed mutual access to inventory through the marketplace for an indeterminate time rather than losing access immediately and irrevocably through scrapping or discarding the inventory as waste.

== See also ==
- Inventory investment
- Inventory management software
- Operations research
- Stock management
- Service level
