= Raymond Goldie =

Dr. Raymond Goldie is a New Zealand-born financial analyst, author and media commentator in Toronto, Canada who is currently an independent analyst. Previously, he was a Senior Vice President and Senior Research Analyst at Salman Partners.

He was named one of Canada’s best analysts by the Globe and Mail.

== Background ==
He is a regular on the Business News Network (BNN) and is the author of Inco Comes to Labrador.

He coined the term "pinch point."

He is known for his "sartorial flair" and has appeared in the Fashion section of The Globe and Mail.

He holds a PhD in geology from Queen's University.

He is the father of game designer and social media researcher Dr. Kate Raynes-Goldie.
