= Scoop wheel =

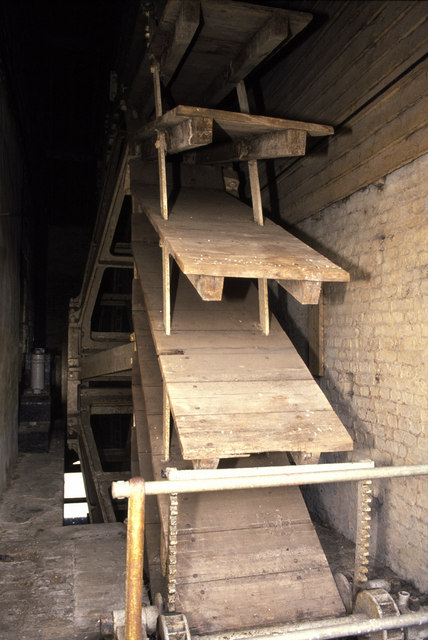
Rim driven Scoop wheel of the Stretham Old Engine, Cambridgeshire

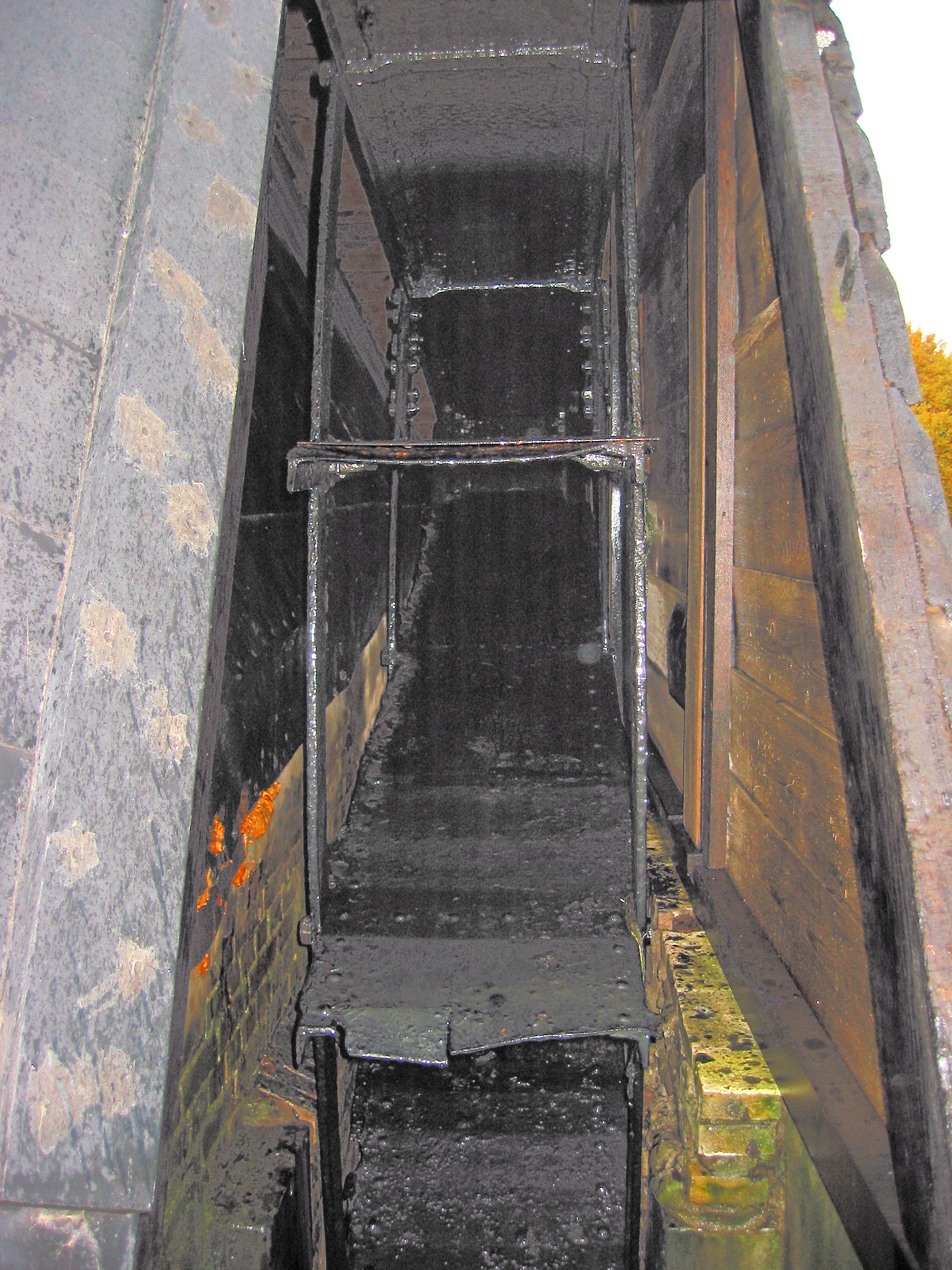
Scoop wheel of a Dutch mill

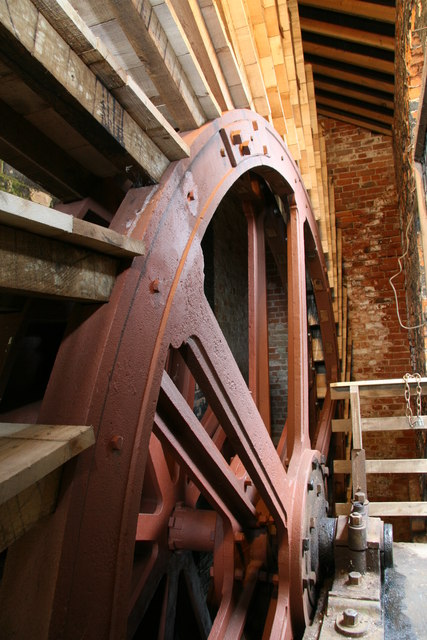
Shaft driven Scoop wheel of the Dogdyke Engine, Lincolnshire

A scoop wheel or scoopwheel is a pump, usually used for land drainage.

A scoop wheel pump is similar in construction to a water wheel, but works in the opposite manner: a waterwheel is water-powered and used to drive machinery, a scoop wheel is engine-driven and is used to lift water from one level to another. Principally used for land drainage, early scoop wheels were wind-driven but later steam-powered beam engines were used. It can be regarded as a form of pump.

A scoop wheel produces a lot of spray. They were frequently encased in a brick building. To maintain efficiency when the river into which the water was discharged was of variable level, or tidal, a 'rising breast' was used, a sort of inclined sluice. The basic construction is, of necessity, similar to an undershot water wheel.

The individual blades were frequently called ladles.

Scoop wheels have been used in land drainage in Northern Germany, in the Netherlands, and in the UK, and occasionally elsewhere in the world. They began to be replaced in the mid 19th century by centrifugal pumps. The East and West Fens to the north of Boston, Lincolnshire were drained by such pumps in 1867, but although they were smaller and more economical to install, a Mr. Lunn was still arguing that scoop wheels were a better solution if the initial cost did not rule them out, they were employed in situations where the water did not need to be raised by more than 8 feet (2.4 m), and where the water levels of the input and output did not vary much.

An interesting comparison between the two types of pumps is available, because a 60-horsepower (45 kW) vertical spindle centrifugal pump was installed at Prickwillow on the River Lark in Cambridgeshire, alongside an existing 60-horsepower (45 kW) scoop wheel. A series of tests were carried out in 1880, to check their efficiency. The scoop wheel lifted 71.45 tons per minute through 9.78 feet (2.98 m), with the engine indicating that it was developing 103.33 hp (77.05 kW), while the newer installation was developing 106 hp (79 kW), and raised 75.93 tons per minute through 10.84 feet (3.30 m). Efficiency was calculated as 46 per cent for the scoop wheel and 52.79 per cent for the centrifugal pump. The most significant difference was the coal consumption, which was reduced from 11.64 pounds (5.28 kg) per hour to 6.66 pounds (3.02 kg) per hour for the newer system.

== See also ==
- Noria
- Sakia
- Dredger

=== Pumping stations employing a scoop wheel ===
- Dogdyke Engine, Lincolnshire
- Pinchbeck Engine, Lincolnshire
- Pode Hole, Lincolnshire (scoop wheel no longer present)
- Stretham Old Engine, Cambridgeshire
- Westonzoyland Pumping Station Museum, Somerset (scoop wheel no longer present)
