= Dogdyke Pumping Station =

Pumping station in Tattershall, Lincolnshire, England

Coordinates: 53°05′13″N 0°12′03″W

Dogdyke Pumping Station Preservation Trust
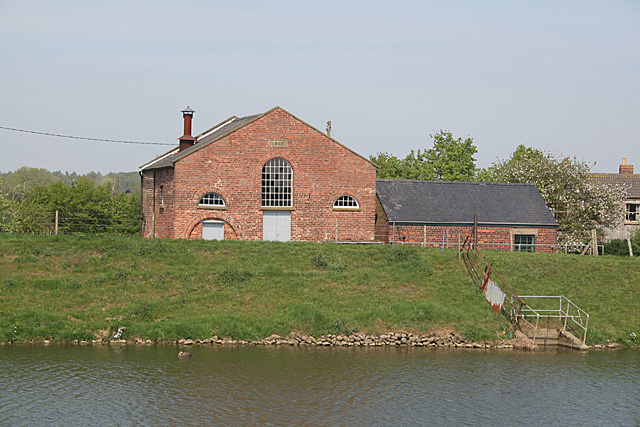
- Dogdyke Pumping Station
- Formation: 1977
- Purpose: The preservation of the Pumping Station, arranging events and demonstration of the pumping engines.
- Location: Bridge Farm, Tattershall LN4 4JG (Access via private farm road, only on steaming days)
- Website: www.dogdyke.com

The Dogdyke Pumping Station is a drainage engine near Tattershall, Lincolnshire, in England. The drainage of 2,500 acres (1,012 ha) of land around Tattershall was authorised in 1796, and came under the control of the Witham Third District commissioners in 1844.

The building dates to 1856 when a rotative beam engine was built to replace windmill style engines possibly dating to 1540 and draining land between the rivers Bain and Witham. The engine discharged into the River Witham, but has a long fetch from a drain parallel to the river called The Dogdyke engine drain originating just south of Kirkstead at a place called Parkbeck.

1856 is relatively late and Wheeler does say that the 1856 engine replaces one installed in 1841, but the location of that is unknown.

The building is a grade II listed ancient monument.

== Engines ==
- Bradley and Craven Beam engine and scoop wheel, built 1856
- Ruston & Hornsby Diesel engine and centrifugal pump, built 1940
- Ruston & Hornsby auxiliary engine.

=== Steam engine ===
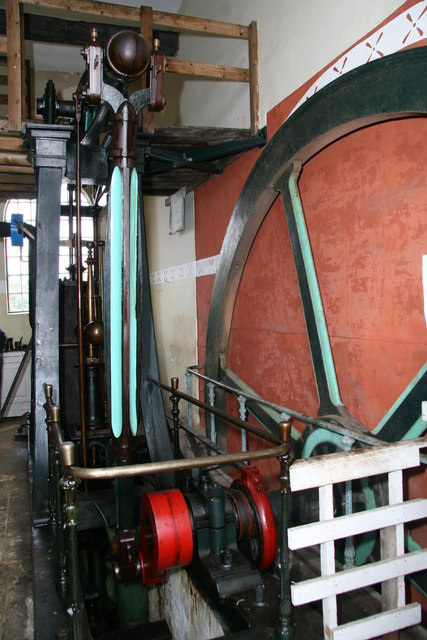
The engine frame and flywheel

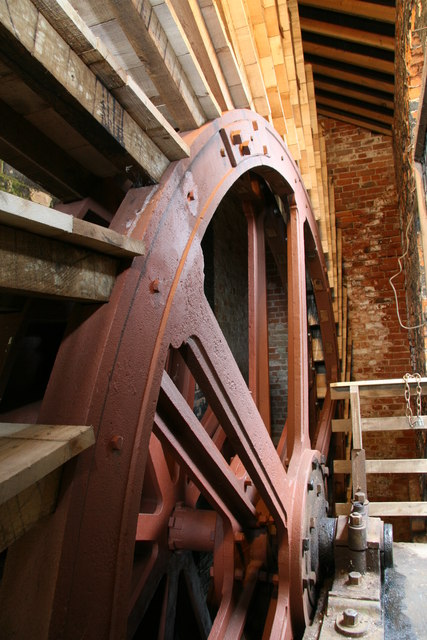
The scoop wheel

The steam engine is maintained by a preservation trust, and steamed on weekends throughout the summer. Although the Pinchbeck Engine is older, it can no longer be steamed. The preservation trust claim this is the oldest working steam drainage engine.

The engine built by Bradley & Craven Ltd of Wakefield has a 16 foot (4.9 m) flywheel, and a cylinder of 24 inches (0.61 m) diameter and 48 inches (1.2 m) stroke. The construction is similar to an 'A' frame, but the decorative form of the cast iron upright obscures that basic shape and might be considered unique.

The scoop wheel is 24 feet (7.3 m) in diameter and runs at up to 7rpm through a 4:1 gearbox from the engine.

The first boiler, which lasted until 1909, was a twin tube Cornish type, working at 12psi. The replacement was a Lancashire boiler made by Fosters of Lincoln, delivering 15psi. Although the structure of this boiler survives, its rear end has been removed to make room for a modern vertical boiler which is used for the demonstration steamings.

The original 100 feet (30 m) Chimney was struck by lightning in 1922 and reduced somewhat. It was felled in 1941 after the conversion to diesel operation.

=== Diesel engines ===
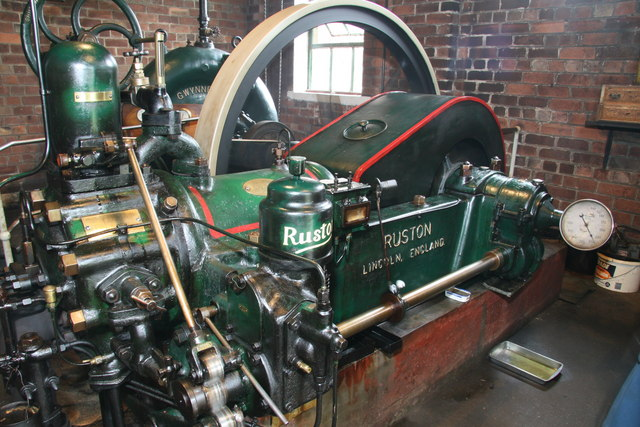
The Ruston engine

The two diesel engines are maintained by The Witham Third District Internal Drainage Board as a standby for the nearby electric pumping station. They are usually operated when the museum is open.

The steam engine was replaced in 1940 by a Ruston & Hornsby 7XHR diesel engine, serial number 194833, driving a 22-inch Gwynnes centrifugal pump. This engine has a capacity of 23.6 litre. The 7XHR design has a single horizontal cylinder of 10 inches (25.4 cm) bore, 18.5 inches (47.0 cm) stroke, and develops 40 horsepower (30 kW) at 300rpm.

There is also a Ruston & Hornsby 1VTO auxiliary engine, used to provide the starting air for the larger engine and to operate a small priming pump for the Gwynnes Limited pump. The 1VTO design has a single horizontal cylinder of 4 inches (10.2 cm) bore, 4 inches (10.2 cm) stroke, and develops 5 horsepower (4 kW) at 1000rpm.

== Public access ==
Access to the site on steaming days involves driving down an unmade road and walking across a grassed area. Although essentially on one level, disabled access is limited because of the historic nature of the site.

Toilets, teas and limited wheelchair access are offered.

== See also ==
- Prickwillow Museum
- Stretham Old Engine
