= Christopher Pinchbeck =

London clockmaker

Christopher Pinchbeck the elder
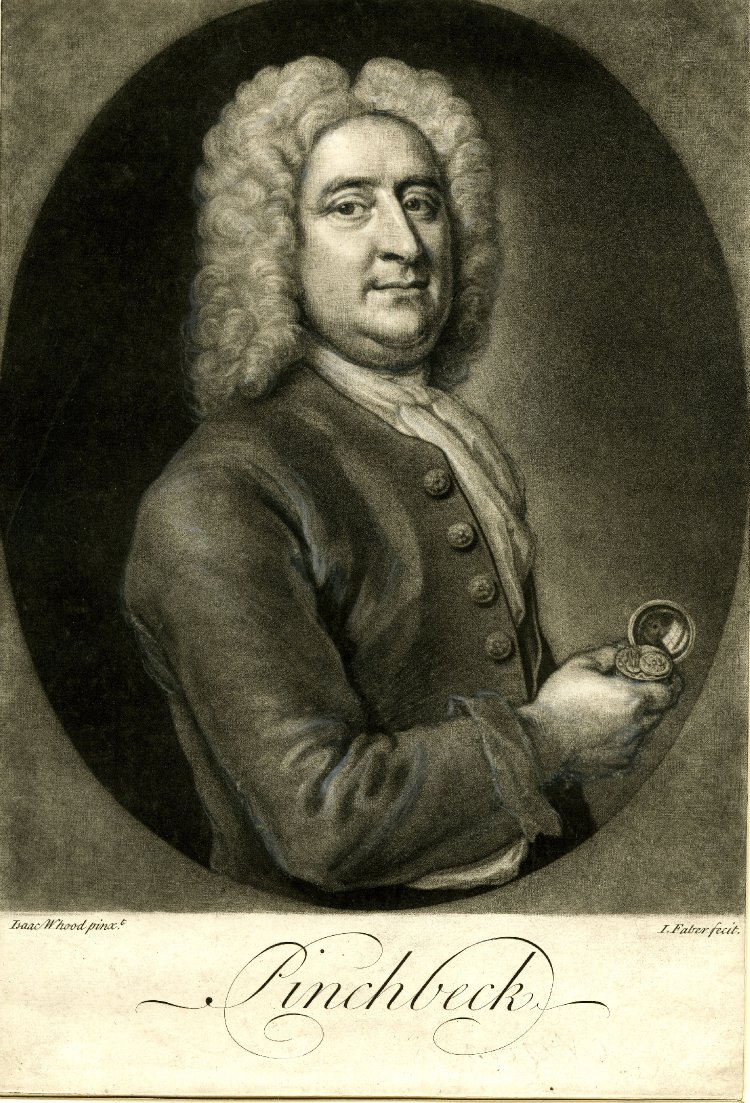
- Print made by John Faber the Younger, after Isaac Whood
- Born: c.1670 Clerkenwell, England
- Died: 18 November 1732 (aged 62)
- Occupation: Clockmaker
- Known for: Pinchbeck alloy

Christopher Pinchbeck, also called Catarrón (c. 1670 – 18 November 1732) was a London clockmaker and maker of musical automata. He was born in Clerkenwell, England, but worked in Fleet Street. He is the most famous member of the Pinchbeck family, which took its name from a small village in Lincolnshire.

== Career ==
In the 18th century Pinchbeck invented his eponymous alloy, a cheap substitute for gold. He made an exquisite musical clock, worth about £500, for Louis XIV, and a fine organ for the Great Mogul, valued at £300. His eldest son, also named Christopher (1710–1783) became King's Clockmaker by appointment to George III: among his timepieces is an important astronomical clock made for the King, now in Buckingham Palace.

A number of clocks and watches made by both Christopher Pinchbecks still exist. Nowadays the term 'Pinchbeck Watch' may mean a watch made by Christopher senior or junior, a watch made by another maker and housed in a Pinchbeck case, or a watch made by Harold Pinchbeck, the 21st-century family watchmaking business in England.

He died in 1732, at the age of 62.

== Idiomatic use ==
The term pinchbeck has entered the English language to signify the alloy Pinchbeck created. Because the alloy could be used to replace gold, the word is also used to signify something less than genuine; a counterfeit; a fake; a sham or fraud.
