= Machine guarding =

Safety shield covering parts of a machine

Machine guarding is a safety feature on or around manufacturing or other engineering equipment consisting of a shield or device covering hazardous areas of a machine to prevent contact with body parts or to control hazards like chips or sparks from exiting the machine. Machine guarding provides a means to protect humans from injury while working nearby or while operating equipment. It is often the first line of defense to protect operators from injury while working on or around industrial machinery during normal operations. In the U.S., machine guarding is referred to in OSHA's CFR 1910.212; in the U.K., machinery safety is covered mainly by PUWER."

== Point guarding ==
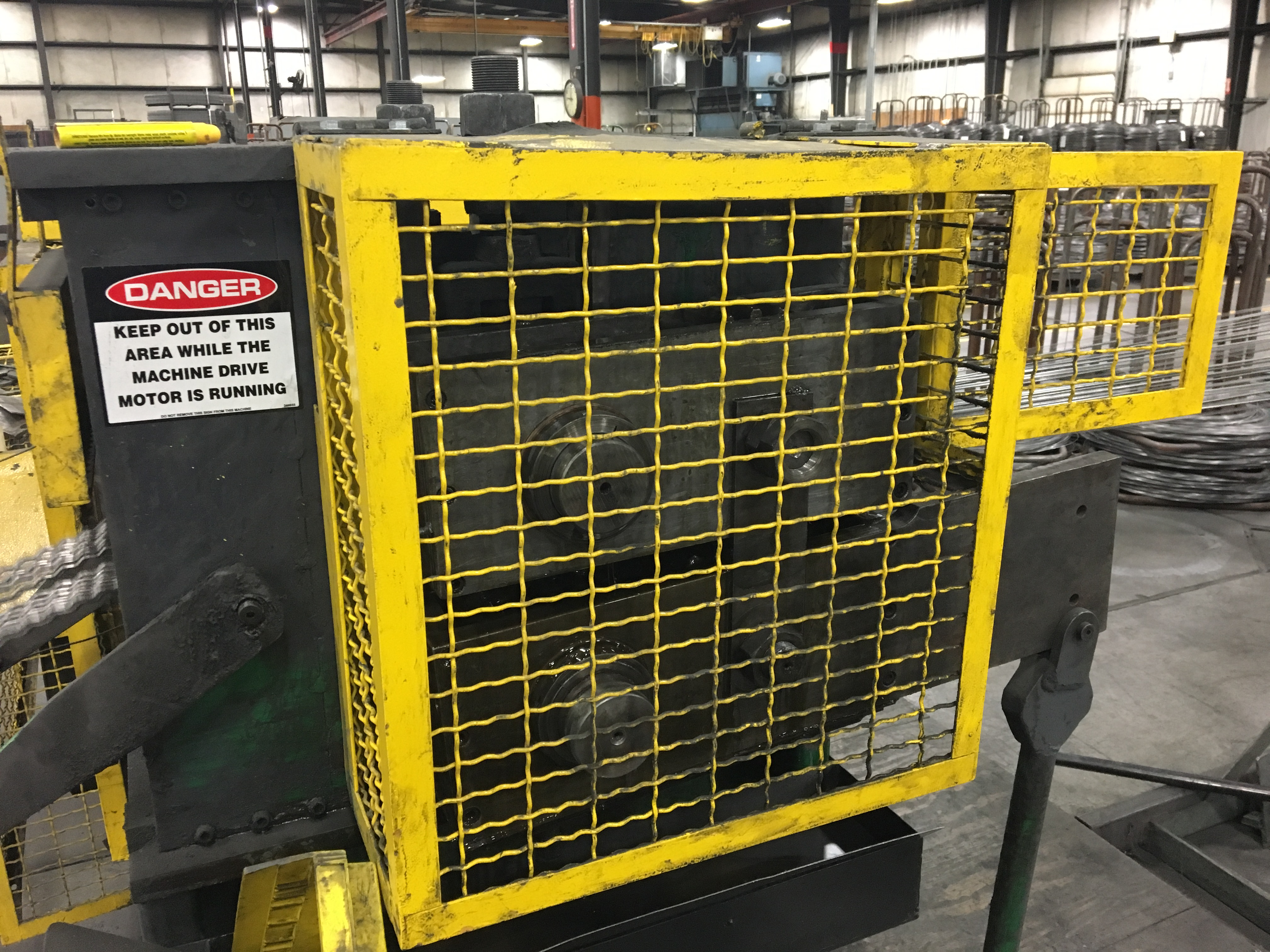
Point guarding around gear operation of machine

Point guarding refers to guarding of moving parts on a machine that present a hazard to the machine operator or others who may come in contact with the hazard. OSHA 1910.212(a)(2) requires these guards to be “affixed to the machine where possible." Specifics for the type and construction of the guard are determined by the proximity of the guard to the hazard, and the type of hazard. Point of Operation Guarding refers to guarding the area of the machine where the work is performed. Construction of the machine and the guarding should “prevent the operator from having any part of his/her body in the danger zone during the operating cycle.”

== Fixed perimeter guarding ==
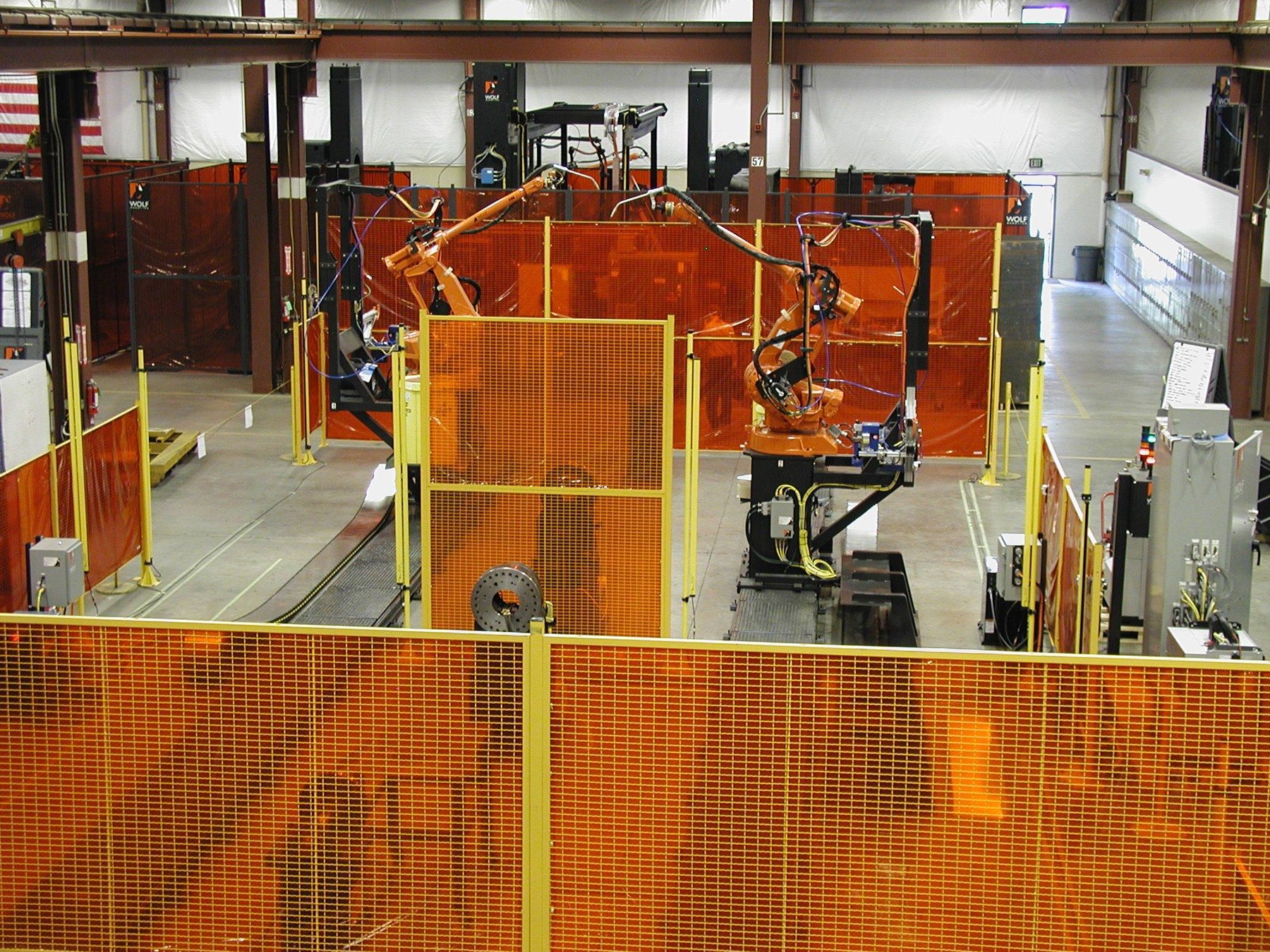
Fixed perimeter guarding with weld curtains

Perimeter or barrier guarding refers to a barrier placed around a work area where an automated piece of equipment-like a robotic arm-performs a function. This type of guarding is generally a wire partition system, but also can take the form of pressure sensitive mats or light curtains. Wire partition systems used as machine guards must be fixed in place either on the machine or around its perimeter. These guarding systems may be configured with various sizes of wire mesh, solid sheet metal, or clear polycarbonate panels. Use of these materials depends on the hazard being guarded and the distance between the hazard and the guard. Mesh opening size of the guard depends on the proximity of the guard to the hazard. If the guard is installed close to moving parts, the mesh openings must be smaller than if the guard is installed a greater distance away from the moving parts. Mesh opening sizes for specific distances from the hazard are defined in ANSI/RIA R15.06-2012. Solid barriers such as sheet metal or clear view polycarbonate can be used to shield the hazard as well as control sparks or liquids. Size of the barrier (height and width) must conform to ANSI/RIA R15.06-2012. Wire partition guards provide a means of access to the guarded equipment with doors, lift out sections, or other controlled openings.

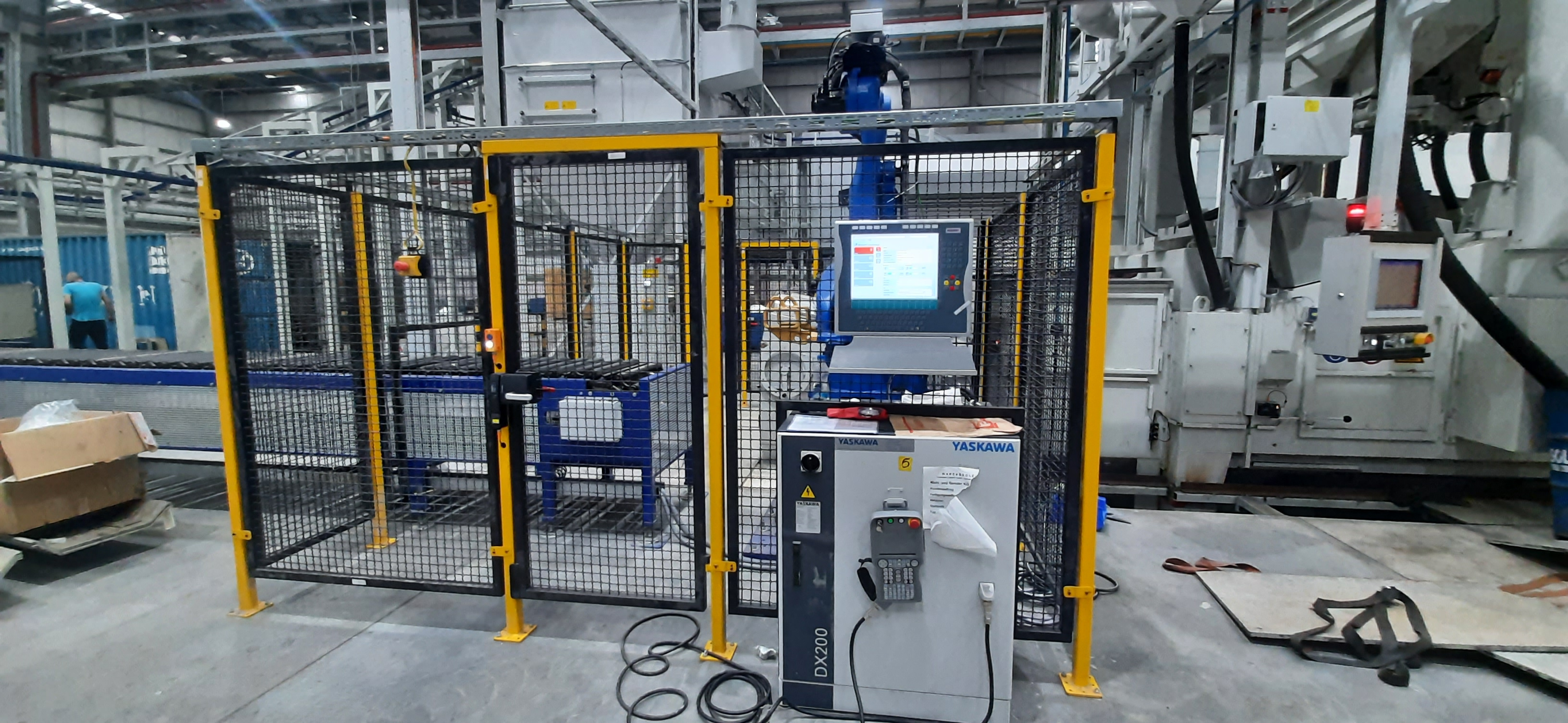

== Safety devices ==
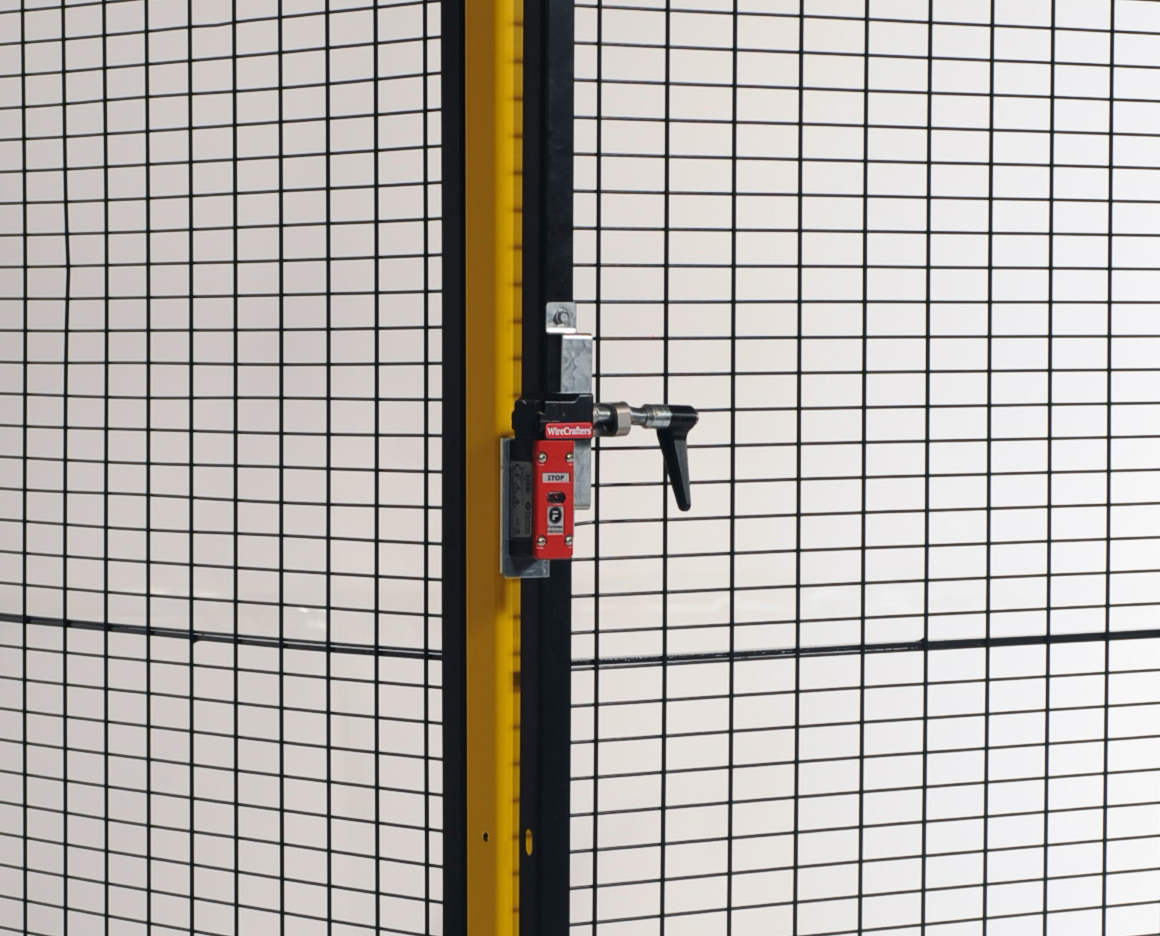
Electrical interlock mounted on wire mesh machine guarding

Electrical interlocks or other devices tied into the equipment's control circuit are mounted on access points and are configured to stop equipment operations when opened. These access points should also incorporate hardware to comply with the OSHA lockout/tagout regulation 1910.147. Lockout-tagout (LOTO) is a safety procedure to ensure the proper shutdown and isolation of hazardous equipment. The primary goal of lockout-tagout (LOTO) is the absolute control of hazardous energy. The lockout/tagout hardware allows the operator or maintenance person to lock the equipment in the stopped state while performing duties in the hazardous area.

Light curtain systems may be used alone or in conjunction with other guarding systems. The light curtain projects a field or beams of light between two points and, when the field is broken-at any point, the light curtain system interrupts the circuit it is wired into. These can be used in areas where an operator must interact with operating equipment to prevent movement of the equipment while the operator works a hazardous area.

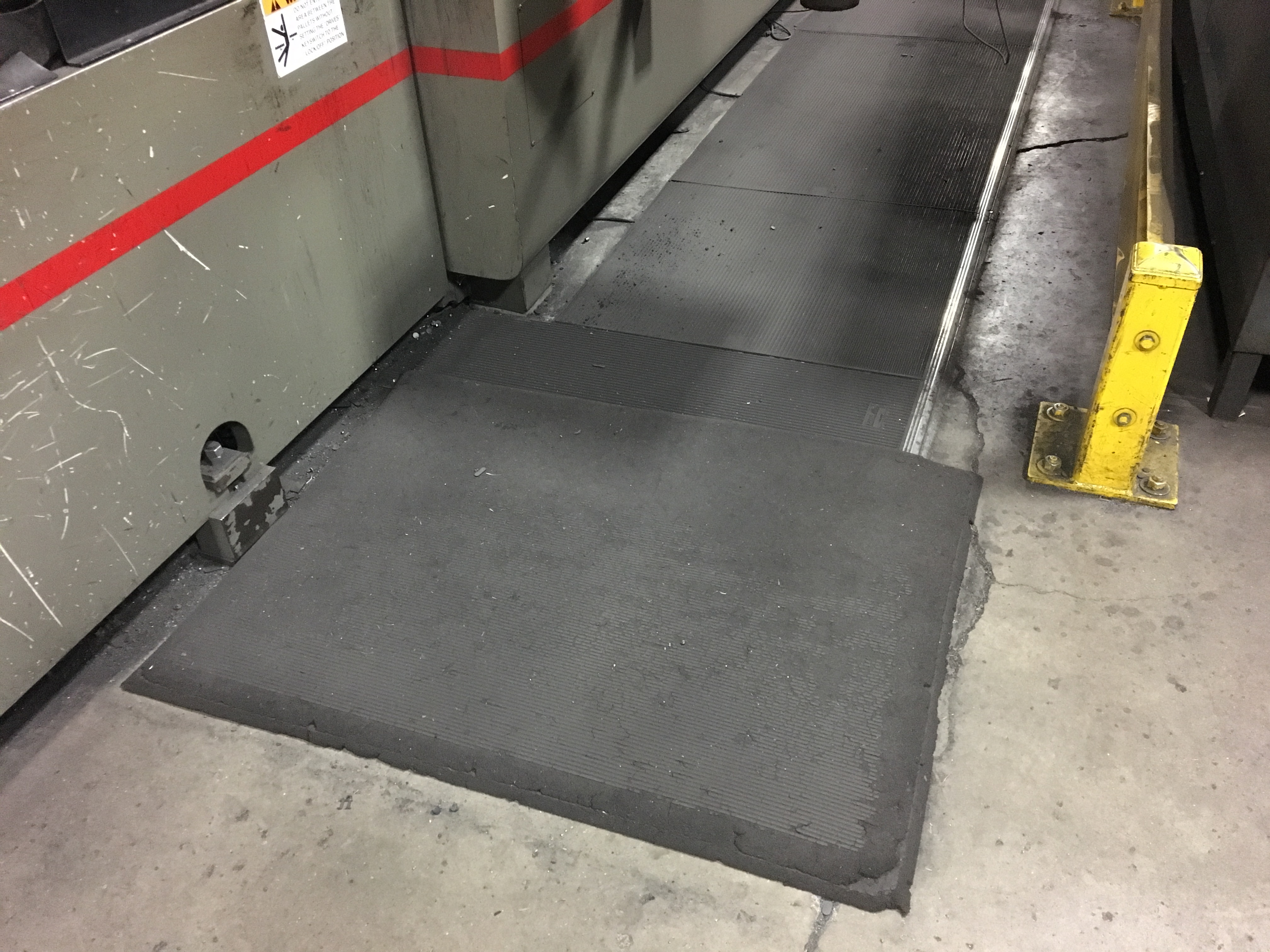
Pressure sensitive mat for operator of laser cutter

Pressure sensitive mats that are wired into the equipment's control system can be placed in hazardous areas and be set to stop the equipment if stepped on. These devices can be used alone or in conjunction with other guarding devices, usually at operator interaction points.

== Applications ==
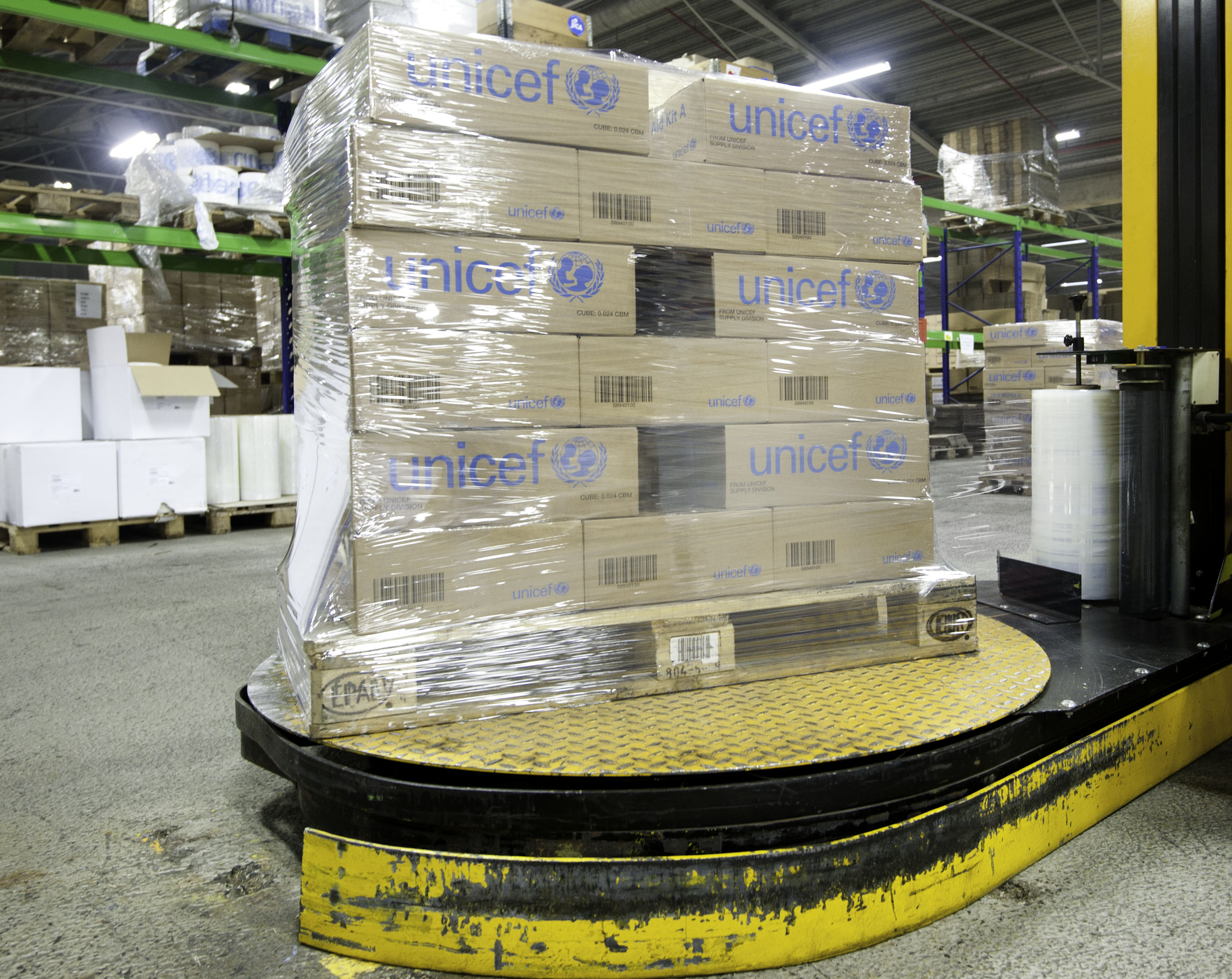
Pallet wrapper without guarding

Packaging Equipment or pallet wrappers have a moving load and an arm that stretches plastic wrap around the load. Typically a three sided wire partition guard is placed around the wrapper, and a light curtain controls access to the open side where the wrapper is accessed by a lift truck.

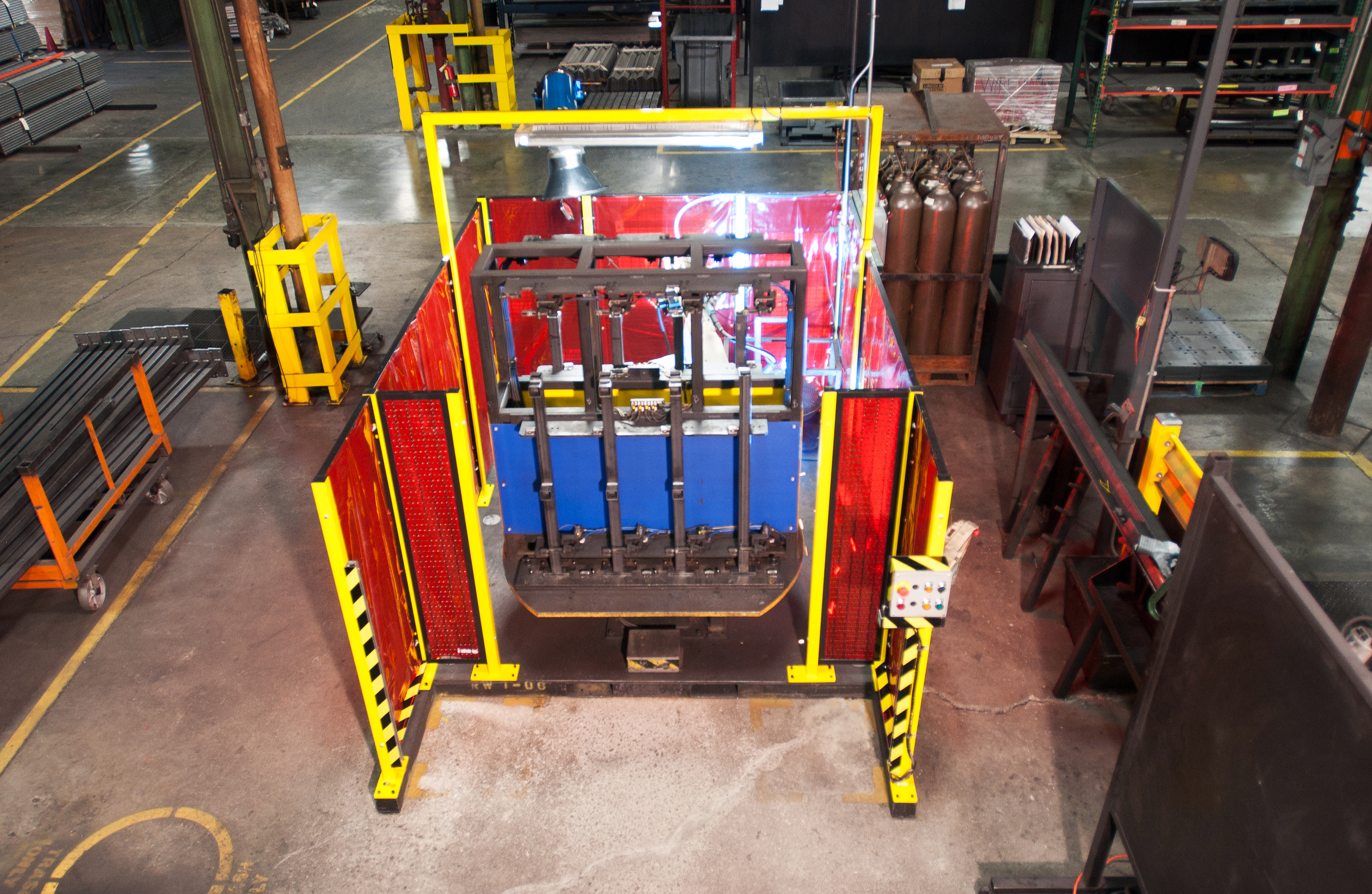
Machine guarding with weld curtains around a robotic weld cell

Robotic Welding Cells incorporate wire mesh fixed barriers outfitted with vinyl welding curtains and light curtains or pressure sensitive mats. The welding curtains mounted inside of the fixed barrier control exposure to welding flash, sparks and spatter from the welding operation. While the light curtain or pressure sensitive mats prevent welding operations while the operator is loading/unloading the weld fixtures.

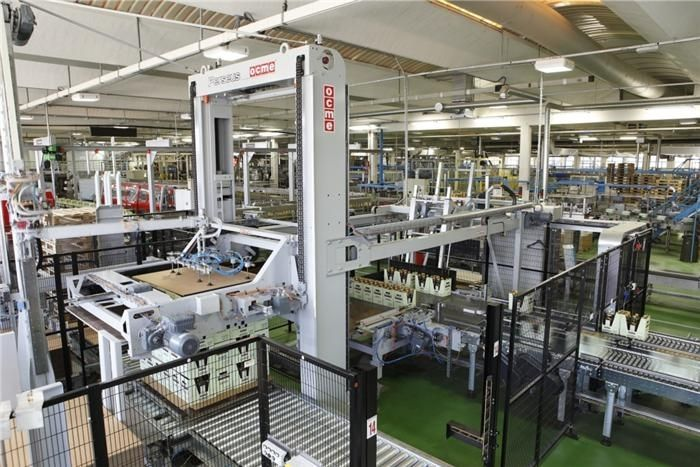
In-Line palletizer with machine guarding

Robotic Material Handling for pallet pack or de-palletizing could use any of the aforementioned guarding systems. Light curtains or pressure sensitive mats around the perimeter of the work area that stop the robot when an operator enters. Wire partition could be used around the work area with an interlocked gate which stops the robot when opened.

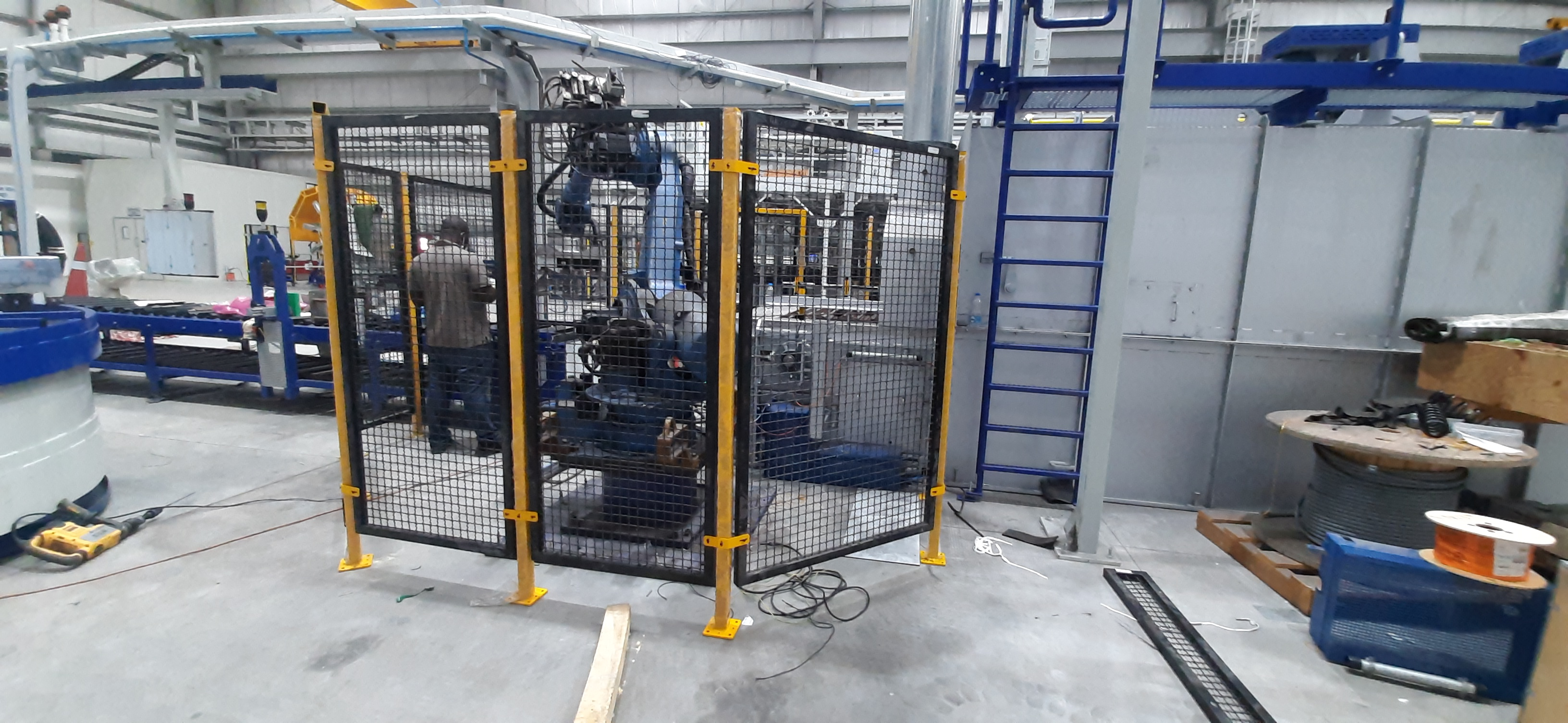
machine safety fence

== See also ==
- Material handling
- Material-handling equipment
- Occupational safety and health
- Pallet racking
