= John Pinch =

John Pinch may refer to:

- John Pinch the Younger (1796–1849), Bath architect
- John Pinch the Elder (1769–1827), Bath architect
- John Pinch (rugby) (1870–1946), rugby player
