= Pinchbeck Engine =

1833 beam engine, Lincolnshire, England

Coordinates: 52°49′04″N 0°07′45″W

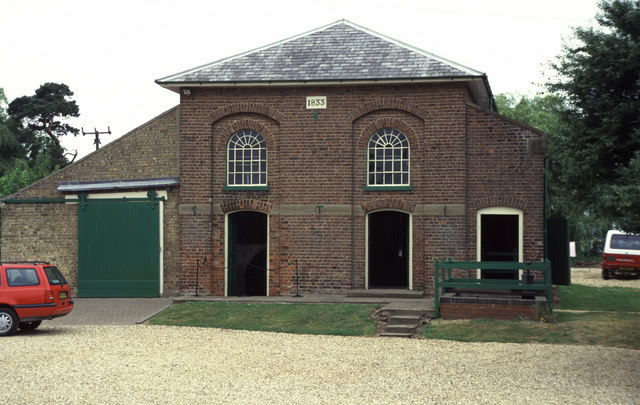
- The engine house

- Location within Lincolnshire
- Type: Beam engine
- OS grid reference: TF 26174 26148

History
- Built: 1833

Site notes
- Owner: Welland and Deepings Internal Drainage Board

Scheduled monument
- Official name: Pinchbeck engine
- Reference no.: 1004966

Listed Building – Grade II
- Official name: Pinchbeck Engine Drainage Pump
- Designated: 13 January 1988
- Reference no.: 1146782

The Pinchbeck Engine is a drainage engine, a rotative beam engine built in 1833 to drain Pinchbeck Marsh, to the north of Spalding, Lincolnshire, in England. Until it was shut down in 1952, the engine discharged into the Blue Gowt which joins the River Glen at Surfleet Seas End.

== Museum ==
In 1952 the engine was rendered obsolete by modern electric pumps and stood forgotten until being opened to the public as a museum in 1979. The coal store was cleared and now houses the associated Museum of Land Drainage. The museum complex includes the blacksmith's shop, still in its original condition. The museum is operated by the Welland and Deepings Internal Drainage Board, successors to the commissioners who erected the engine. The buildings are Grade II listed and also a Scheduled Ancient Monument.

The chimney was demolished in 1952, and no actions were taken to preserve the boiler, which is no longer in a fit state to be used. The engine is a static exhibit, which can be rotated by an electric motor for demonstration purposes.

== Beam engine ==
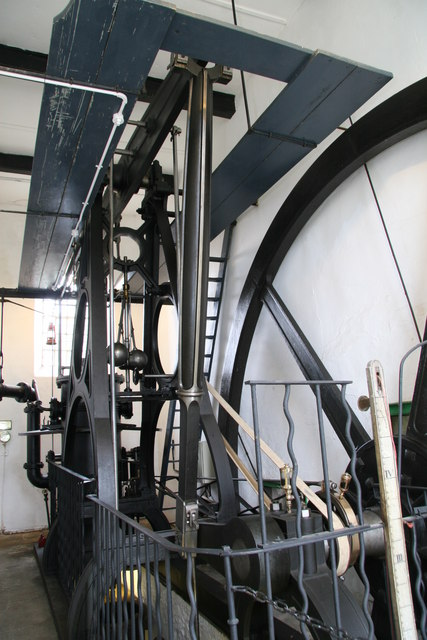
The engine frame and flywheel

The engine is a 20 horsepower (15 kW) condensing steam engine with an overhead beam supported by an 'A'-frame. It was built by the Butterley Company of Ripley, Derbyshire. It has a single cylinder of 35 inches (89 cm) bore and 56 inches (1.42 m) stroke. The flywheel is 18 feet 6 inches (5.64 m) in diameter. The engine ran at up to 30 rpm.

The engine is gear-coupled to a single scoop wheel in an adjacent compartment. There are 40 paddles around the circumference of the 22-foot (6.71 m) wheel, which could lift a maximum of 7,500 imperial gallons (34,000 L) of water per minute through an 8-foot (2.44 m) lift. The annual effort varied between 1,093,000 long tons (1,111,000 t) tons of water lifted, and 3,690,000 long tons (3,749,000 t). Typically the engine was operated for around 180 days a year and an engine man was permanently retained, living on the site.

The boiler dates from 1895 and is a twin furnace Lancashire boiler, delivering 12 psi (83 kPa). It consumed around 1 cwt (51 kg) of coal per hour. Coal supplies were originally brought by barge, but after the land was successfully drained a railway line was laid from Spalding to Boston, and coals were delivered to a nearby goods facility. They were then transported on a very short narrow gauge railway line in colliery-style tubs. The motive power for this appears to have been human. One of the tubs and a metre or so of line is displayed at the museum.

The engine is said to be the earliest 'A'-frame engine still in situ, the longest-working beam engine in the Fens, and the last in use.

== See also ==
- Pode Hole where the Welland and Deeping IDB have another museum.
- Dogdyke Pumping Station
- Stretham Old Engine
