= Pinchbeck (alloy) =

Metal alloy

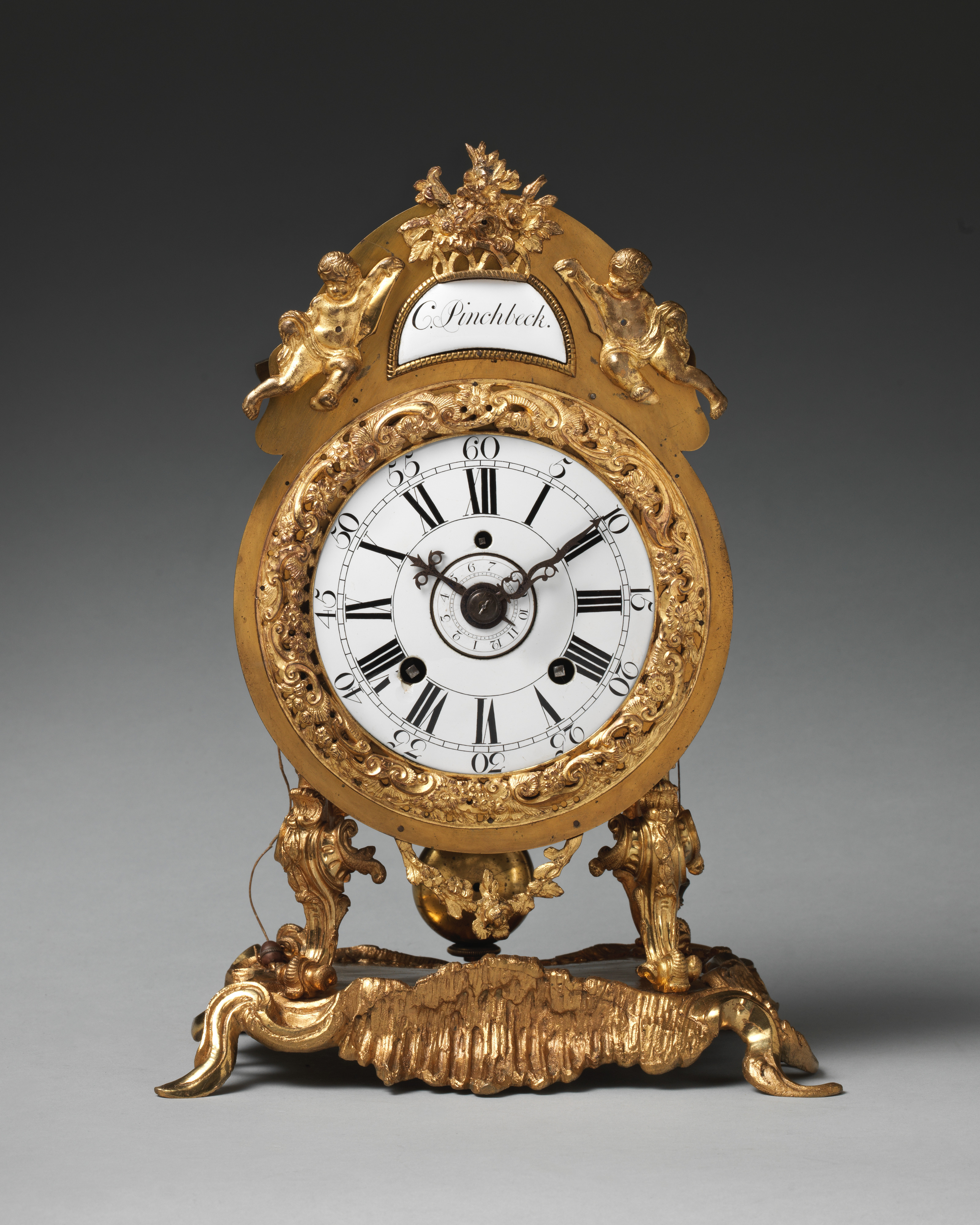
A Pinchbeck clock of c. 1775 in the collection of the Metropolitan Museum of Art

Pinchbeck is a form of brass, an alloy of copper and zinc mixed in proportions such that it closely resembles gold in appearance. It was invented in the early-18th century by Christopher Pinchbeck (died 1732), a London clock-and watch-maker. Since gold was only sold in 18-carat quality at that time, the development of pinchbeck allowed ordinary people to buy gold-"effect" jewellery on a budget. The inventor allegedly made pinchbeck jewellery clearly labelled as such. Pinchbeck jewellery was used for things like stagecoaches where there was a risk of theft. The original pinchbeck ware was made by Christopher Pinchbeck and his descendants until the 1830s. Later dishonest jewellers passed pinchbeck off as gold; over the years the name came to connotate a cheap and tawdry imitation of gold. Today, depending on the dealer, "Pinchbeck" can mean original Pinchbeck or any gilt metal.

Pinchbeck fell out of favor in the second half of the 19th century after England legalised low-carat gold in 1854.

Pinchbeck is typically composed of copper and zinc in ratios of 89% copper to 11% zinc; or 93% copper to 7% zinc.

== See also ==
- Gilding metal
- Prince's metal
