= Pinch point (economics) =

A pinch-point is the level of inventories of a commodity or product below which consumers of that commodity or product become concerned about security of supply.

== Background ==
When inventories are below the pinch-point, small changes in the balance of supply and demand can cause large changes in the price of the commodity or product.

The term was suggested in 1988 by Walter Curlook (Executive Vice-President of Inco Ltd) and was first published by Raymond Goldie with Rob Maiman in 1990. In 2000 Raymond Goldie trademarked the term.

== See also ==
- Partnerized inventory management
