= Saqiyah =

Mechanical water lifting device

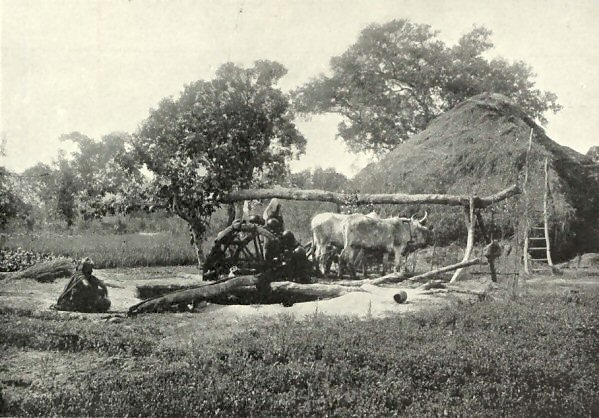
The Saqiyah, c. 1905

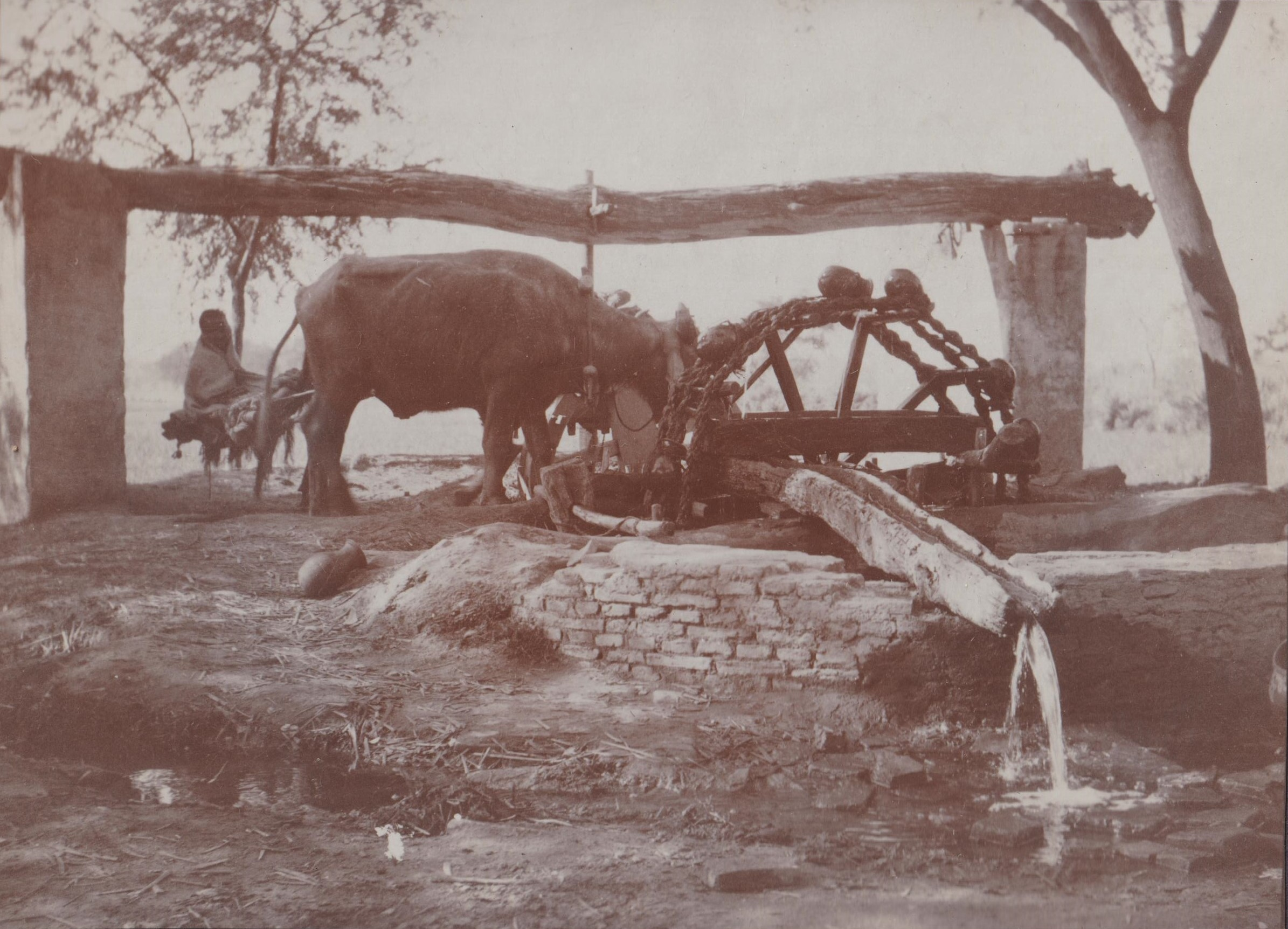
'Punjab Wheel', India c.1917

A sāqiyah or saqiya (Arabic: ساقية), also spelled sakia or saqia) is a mechanical water lifting device. It is also called a Persian wheel, tablia, rehat, and in Latin tympanum. It is similar in function to a scoop wheel, which uses buckets, jars, or scoops fastened either directly to a vertical wheel, or to an endless belt activated by such a wheel. The vertical wheel is itself attached by a drive shaft to a horizontal wheel, which is traditionally set in motion by animal power (oxen, donkeys, etc.) Because it is not using the power of flowing water, the sāqiyah is different from a noria and any other type of water wheel.

The sāqiyah is still used in India, Egypt and other parts of the Middle East, and in the Iberian Peninsula and the Balearic Islands. It may have been invented in Ptolemaic Kingdom of Egypt, Iran, Kush or India. The sāqiyah was mainly used for irrigation, but not exclusively, as the example of Qusayr 'Amra shows, where it was used at least in part to provide water for a royal bathhouse.

== Name and meaning ==
=== Etymology and related meanings ===
The Arabic word saqiya (Arabic: ساقية) is derived from the root verb saqa (Arabic: سقى), meaning to "give to drink" or "make (someone/something) drink". From this, the word saqiya (often transliterated as seguia in Morocco or the Maghreb) has the sense of "one that gives water" or "irrigator". Its general meaning is to denote a water channel for irrigation or for city water supplies, but by extension it applies to a device which provides water for such irrigation. Likewise, Spanish acequia, derived from the same word, is used to denote an irrigation canal or water channel in Spain. In the Maghreb and Morocco, the related word saqqaya (Arabic: سقاية) also denotes a public fountain where residents could take water (similar in function to a sabil). The English term Persian wheel is first attested in the 17th century (but in the earliest case for a water-driven wheel).

=== Saqiya versus noria ===
The term saqiyah or saqiya is the usual term for water-raising devices powered by animals. The term noria is commonly used for devices which use the power of moving water to turn the wheel instead. Other types of similar devices are grouped under the name of chain pumps. A noria in contrast uses the water power obtained from the flow of a river. The noria consists of a large undershot water-wheel whose rim is made up of a series of containers which lift water from the river to an aqueduct at the top of the wheel. Some famous examples are the norias of Hama in Syria or the Albolafia noria in Cordoba, Spain.

However, the names of traditional water-raising devices used in the Middle East, India, Spain and other areas are often used loosely and overlappingly, or vary depending on region. Al-Jazari's famous book on mechanical devices, for example, groups the water-driven wheel and several other types of water-lifting devices under the general term saqiya. In Spain, by contrast, the term noria is used for both types of wheels, whether powered by animals or water current.

== Description ==
=== With buckets directly on the wheel ===
The saqiya is a large hollow wheel, traditionally made of wood. One type has its clay pots or buckets attached directly to the periphery of the wheel, which limits the depth it can scoop water from to less than half its diameter. The modern version also known as zawaffa or jhallan is normally made of galvanized sheet steel and consists of a series of scoops. The modern type dispenses the water near the hub rather than from the top, the opposite of the traditional types. These devices were in widespread use in China, India, Pakistan, Syria and Egypt.

Saqiya wheels range in diameter from two to five metres. Though traditionally driven by draught animals, they are also attached to an engine or electric motor. While animal-driven saqiyas can rotate at 2–4 rpm, motorised ones can make as much as 8–15 rpm. Formerly hundreds of thousands were in use in the Nile valley and delta.

Schematic of a modern saqiya as described by the FAO)

=== With buckets attached to endless belt ===
The historical Middle-Eastern device known in Arabic as saqiya usually had its buckets attached to a double chain, creating a so-called "pot garland". This allowed scooping water out of a much deeper well.

An animal-driven saqiya can raise water from 10 to 20 metres depth, and is thus considerably more efficient than a swape or shadoof, as it is known in Arabic, which can only pump water from 3 metres.

=== Spanish type also wind-powered ===
In Spanish an animal-driven saqiya is named aceña, with the exception of the Cartagena area, where it is called a noria de sangre, or "waterwheel of blood". There is also a much rarer type of saqiya which is driven by wind.

== History ==
=== Kingdom of Kush ===
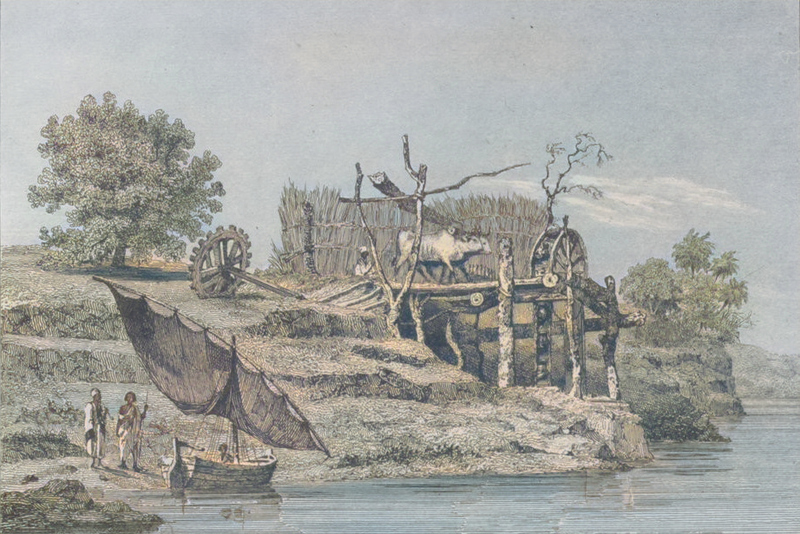
A Nubian saqiyah in the 19th century

The saqiya was known in Meroitic Nubia (Kingdom of Kush) from the 3rd century BC, where it was known as Kolē. The Ancient Nubians used the saqiya to improve irrigation during the Meroitic period. The introduction of this machine had a decisive influence on agriculture as this wheel lifted water 3 to 8 metres faster than the Shaduf, which was the previous irrigation device in the Kingdom. The Shaduf relied on human work while the saqiya was driven by buffalos or other animals.

=== India ===
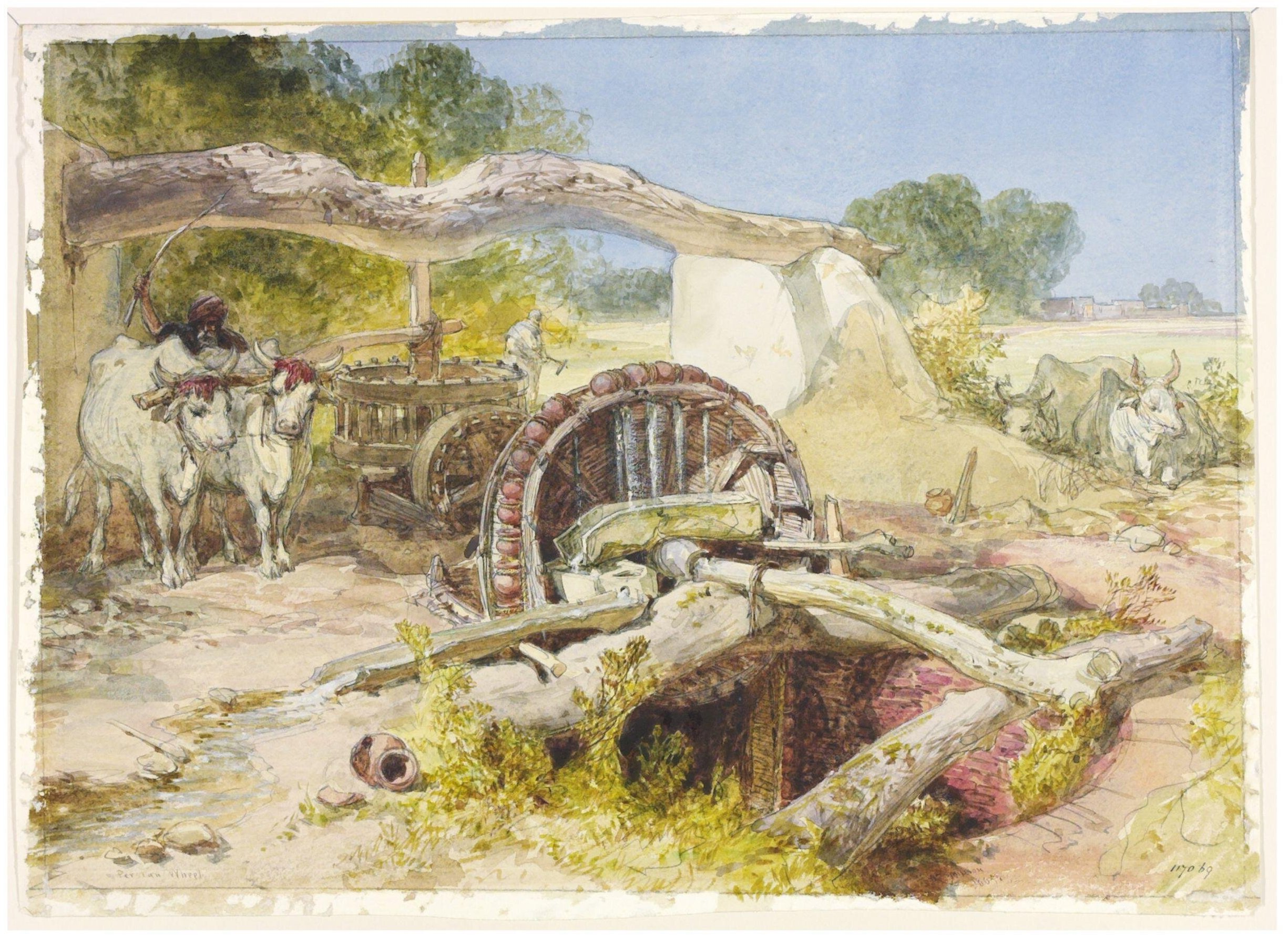
Watercolour painting titled 'Persian wheel near Amritsar', painted in 1864–65 by William Simpson

The sāqiyah might, according to Ananda Coomaraswamy, have been invented in India, where the earliest reference to it is found in the Panchatantra (c. 3rd century BC), where it was known as an araghaṭṭa; which is a combination or the words ara (speedy or a spoked[wheel]) and ghaṭṭa "pot" in Sanskrit. That device was either used like a sāqiyah, to lift water from a well while being powered by oxen or people, or it was used to irrigate fields when it was powered in the manner of a water-wheel by being placed in a stream or large irrigation channel. In the latter case we usually speak of a noria as opposed to a sāqiyah.

In Ranjit Sitaram Pandit's translation of Kalhana's 12th century chronicle Rajatarangini, this mechanism is alluded to when describing a yantra used for drawing water from a well. According to Jagtar Singh Grewal, the introduction of artificial irrigation by well (Sakiyah) in the 11th century in Punjab after the Turkic conquest of the area allowed for an increased population in the northern sections of the region's doabs.

=== Egypt ===
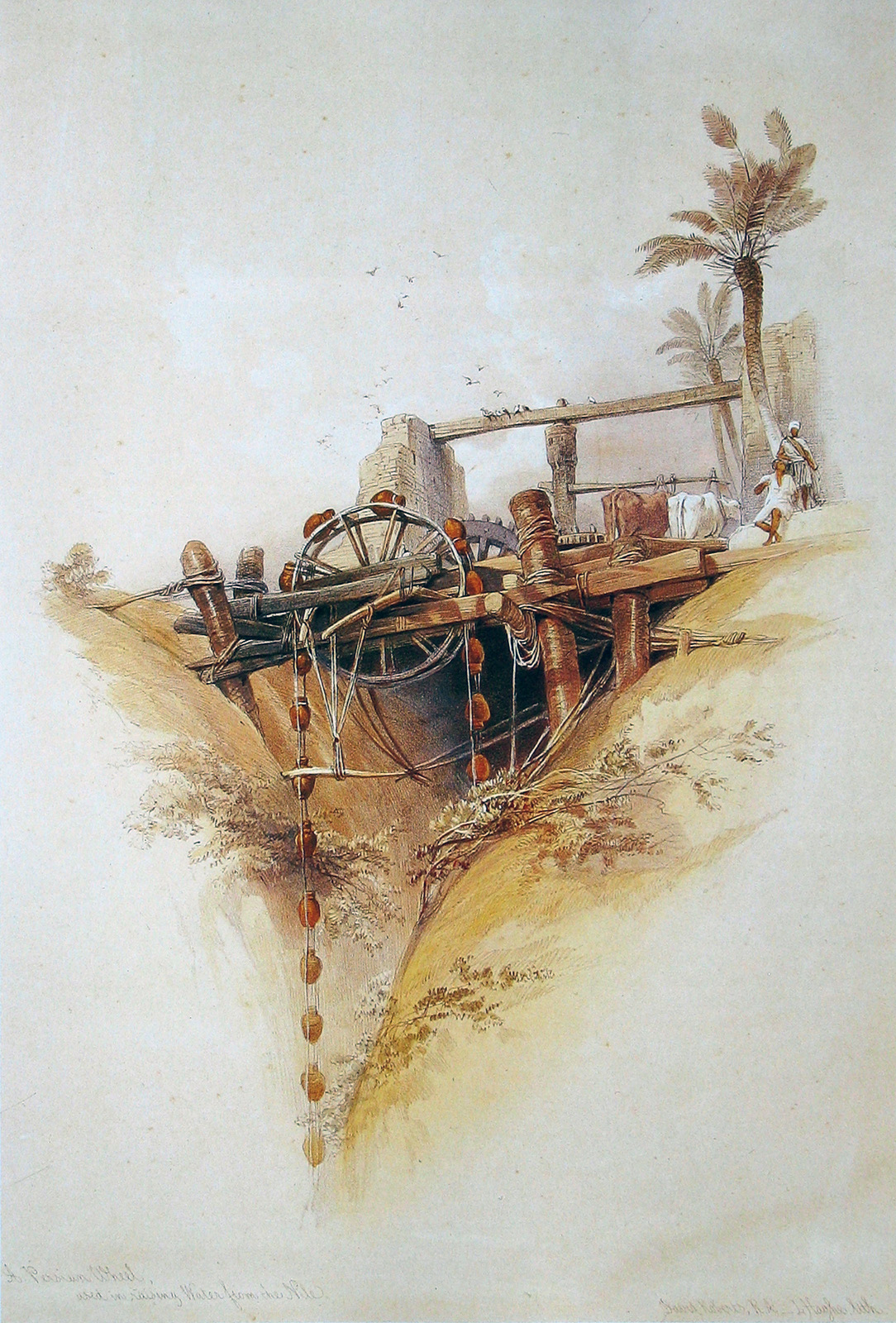
Water wheel used for irrigation in Nubia, painted by David Roberts in 1838

Paddle-driven water-lifting wheels had appeared in ancient Egypt by the 4th century BC. According to John Peter Oleson, both the compartmented wheel and the hydraulic noria appeared in Egypt by the 4th century BC, with the saqiya being invented there a century later. This is supported by archeological finds at Faiyum, where the oldest archeological evidence of a water wheel has been found, in the form of a saqiya dating back to the 3rd century BC. A papyrus dating to the 2nd century BC also found in Faiyum mentions a water wheel used for irrigation, a 2nd-century BC fresco found at Alexandria depicts a compartmented saqiya, and the writings of Callixenus of Rhodes mention the use of a saqiya in the Ptolemaic Kingdom during the reign of Ptolemy IV Philopator in the late 3rd century BC.

Early Mediterranean evidence of a saqiya is from a tomb painting in Ptolemaic Egypt that dates to the 2nd century BC. It shows a pair of yoked oxen driving a compartmented waterwheel. The saqiya gear system is already shown fully developed to the point that "modern Egyptian devices are virtually identical". It is assumed that the scientists of the Musaeum, at the time the most active Greek research center, may have been involved in its implementation. An episode from Caesar's Civil War in 48 BC tells of how Caesar's enemies employed geared waterwheels to pour sea water from elevated places on the position of the trapped Romans.

The saqiya was sufficiently iconic in the Egyptian mind that a style of earring named after it was produced between the 1830s and 1950s, which is still worn today by enthusiasts and collectors of vintage Egyptian jewelry.

=== Roman Empire ===
Philo of Byzantium wrote of such a device in the 2nd century BC; the historian Vitruvius mentioned them around 30 BC; remains of tread wheel driven, bucket chains, dating from the 2nd century BC, have been found in baths at Pompeii, and Costa, Italy; fragments of the buckets and a lead pipe, from a crank handle operated, chain driven, bilge pump, were found one of the 1st century AD Nemi ships, of Lake Nemi; and a preserved 2nd century AD example, used to raise water from a well, to an aquifer in London, has also been unearthed.

=== Talmudic sources ===
The term used by Talmudic sources for a saqiya is 'antelayyā-wheel.

=== Medieval Islamic realm ===
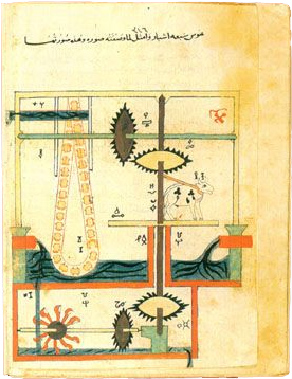
Al-Jazari's advanced saqiya, both animal- and water-wheel-driven (1206).

A manuscript by Ismail al-Jazari featured an intricate device based on a saqiya, powered in part by the pull of an ox walking on the roof of an upper-level reservoir, but also by water falling onto the spoon-shaped pallets of a water wheel placed in a lower-level reservoir.

Complex saqiyas consisting of more than 200 separate components were used extensively by Muslim inventors and engineers in the medieval Islamic world. The mechanical flywheel, used to smooth out the delivery of power from a driving device to a driven machine and, essentially, to allow lifting water from far greater depths (up to 200 metres), was employed by ibn Bassal (fl. 1038–1075), of al-Andalus.

The first known use of a crank in a saqiya was featured in another one of al-Jazari's machines. The concept of minimising the intermittence is also first implied in one of al-Jazari's saqiya devices, which was to maximise the efficiency of the saqiya. Al-Jazari also constructed a water-raising device that was run by hydropower, though the Chinese had been using hydropower for the same purpose before him. Animal-powered saqiyas and water-powered norias similar to the ones he described have been supplying water in Damascus since the 13th century, and were in everyday use throughout the medieval Islamic world.

== See also ==
- Man engine
