= Alegría watermill =

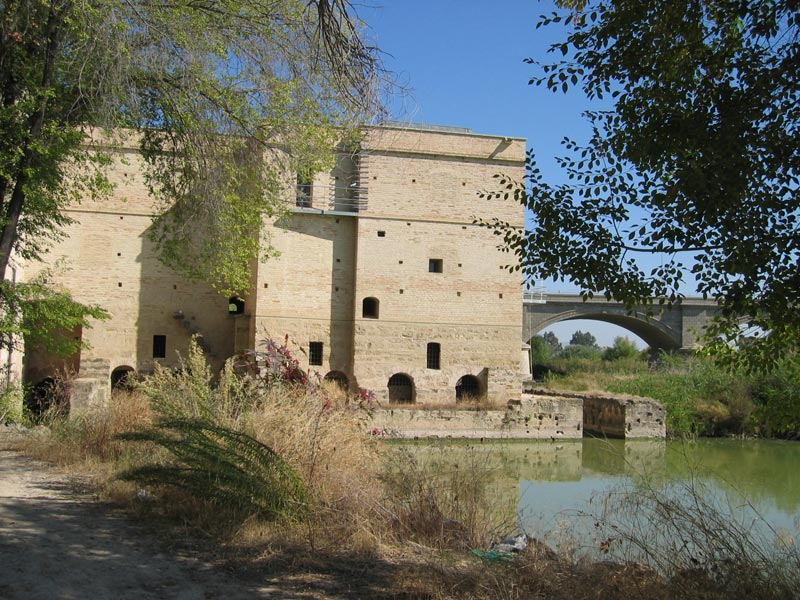
- The Alegría watermill from the southwest c. 2007
- Interactive map of the Alegría watermill area

General information
- Location: Jardín Botánico de Córdoba, Córdoba
- Coordinates: 37°52′18″N 04°47′02″W
- Current tenants: Museo de Paleobotánica Roberto Wagner
- Owner: Córdoba Municipality

Website
- jardinbotanicodecordoba.com/otros-espacios/museo-paleobotanico

The Alegría watermill Spanish: Molino de la Alegría is located in Córdoba, Spain, on the right bank of the Guadalquivir River, downstream of San Rafael bridge on the weir called Azuda de la Alhadra. The watermill houses the Roberto Wagner Museum of Paleobotany, which is part of the Botanical Garden of Córdoba. The mill is one of the eleven so-called Mills of the Guadalquivir, which were declared a Bien de Interés Cultural in 2009.

== The watermill building ==
The Alegría watermill is on the right bank of the Guadalquivir. The water mill proper is between two spillways in the weir. The spillway on the southwest separates it from the rest of the weir. The spillway on the northwest side can be crossed over a small bridge and leads to a renaissance fulling mill which was part of the Alegría complex.

In the early twentieth century, two floors were added to the building. This masks the original Moorish building. The warehouses and structure are what remains of the previous mill. The façade shows three levels. The lower level is made of stone, the two above it are brick and date from the 19th century.

The mill building consists of a large rectangular central room. It is roughly aligned from west to east, and has an apsidal ceiling on the east side. The room is divided into three rectangular spaces, roughly aligned north to south, i.e. in line with the course of the river. Each of these three spaces was over two channels that could move a separate wheel. Each wheel could turn two grinding stones. Four of these have been preserved in this area. The third space has lost its stones and now shows the shaft that remains from a water turbine.

The fulling mill is separated from the main mill by a spillway channel. The entrance door of the fulling mill can be dated to the sixteenth century. From 1910 to 1913, the spilling way that separated the two mills was vaulted, and so the original mill and the fulling mill were joined by two upper floors of brick.

== History ==
=== Background ===
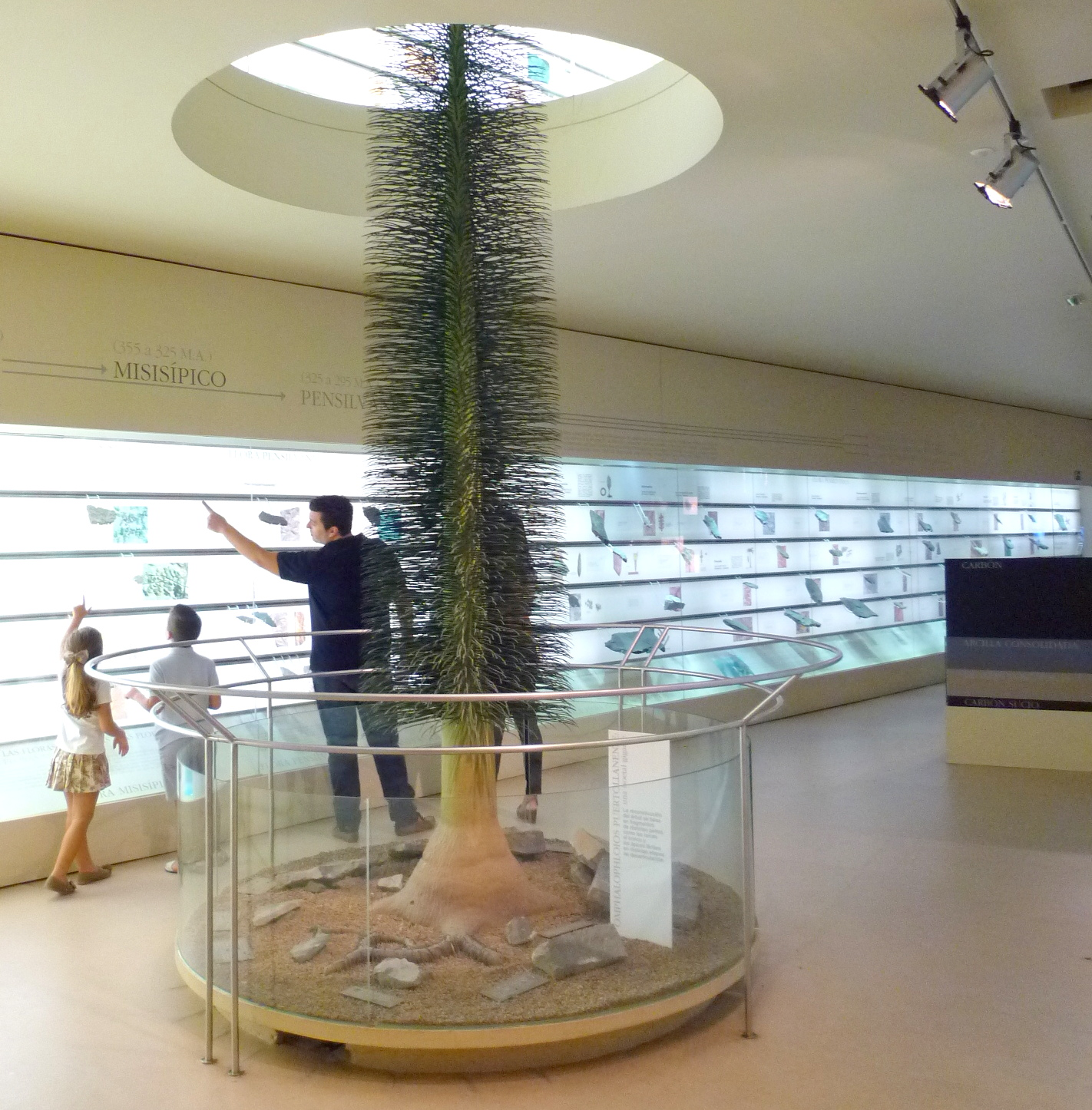
Interior of the mill

The weir on which the Alegría mill and the San Rafael and San Lorenzo mills are located, was known as 'Alhadra', i.e. 'The Green' and dates from Moorish times.

After the 1236 Christian conquest of Córdoba, the Diocese of Córdoba acquired many mills on this weir. This took place through various donations, starting in 1272. The church would remain owner for centuries.

In the fifteenth century, most of the flour mills were converted to fulling mills. At one time, it led to an inventory that showed three normal watermills and three fulling mills on the Alhadra weir. In the seventeenth century the mills were adapted to make use of the new Regolfo technology. This was known in the eighteenth century as the Tripas mill, but this technology disappeared that same century.

=== The Alegría watermill ===
In 1780 Antonio Luque bought the ruinous Alegría watermill from the Cathedral Chapter. He rebuilt it and renamed it the Alegría mill. During the second half of the 19th century the building got the appearance that it preserves today. Starting in 1910 the mill underwent a major remodeling, as it was rebuilt and converted into a three-story flour factory called San José. It was a mill with two pairs of stones and a turbine.

In 1919 the mill was an asset that was brought in to found the joint stock company called "La Harinera Cordobesa". Harinera means flour mill. In 1928 the mill was sold to the Sociedad de Gas y Electricidad de Córdoba, which probably converted it into a power plant. In 1940 the mill was sold to the Compañía Eléctrica Mengemor. In 1964 it was sold to the Sevillana de Electricidad.

The mill was restored in 1999–2000. The upper floors were refurbished and became the city's Paleobotanical Museum, part of the Botanical Garden of Córdoba. On 11 July 2002 the museum was opened as the first of its kind in Spain.
