= Mills of the Guadalquivir =

Set of spanish monuments

Guadalquivir River Watermills
- Molinos del Guadalquivir (Córdoba) (Spanish)
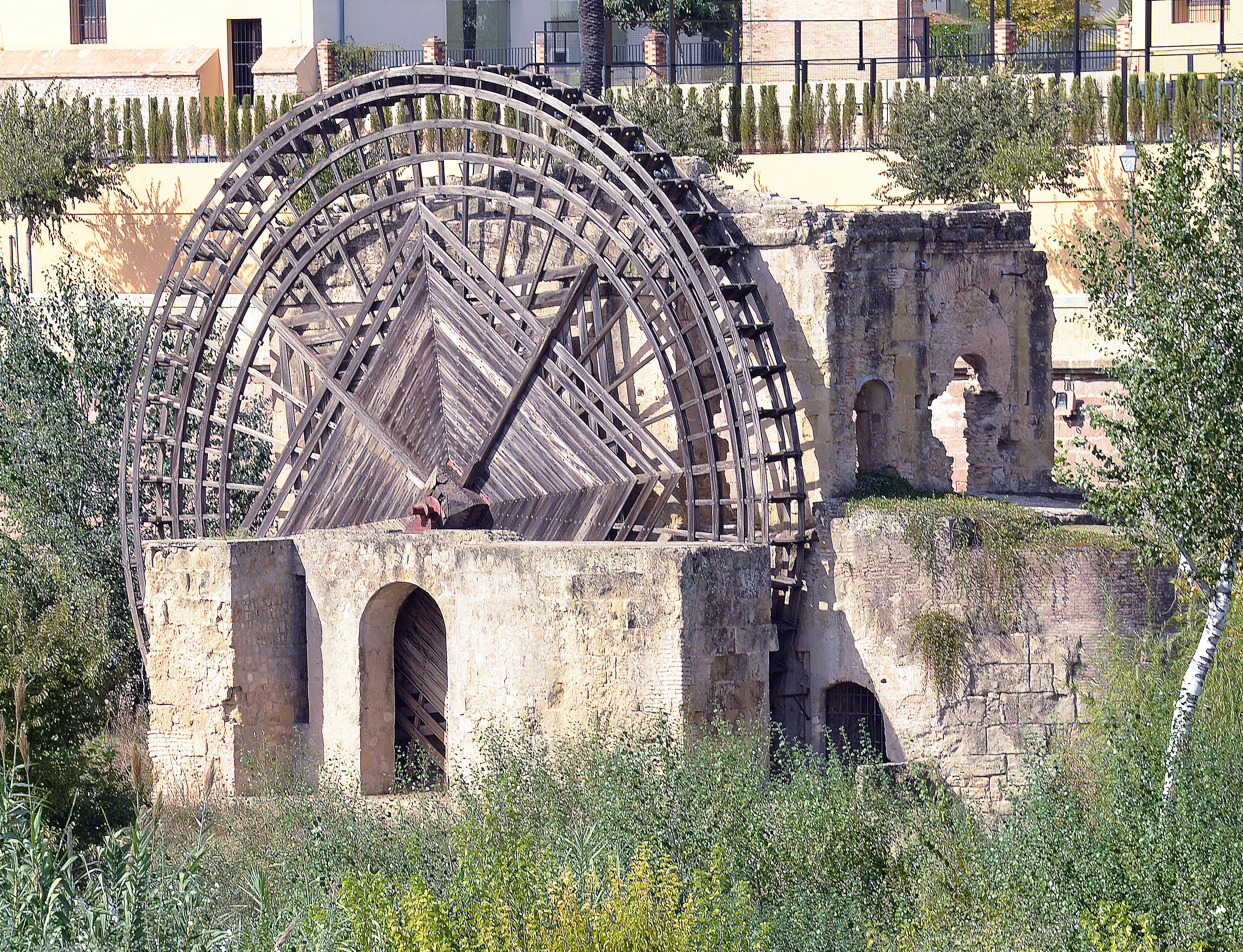
- Albolafia mill
- Type: Collection of watermills
- Location: Córdoba. Spain

Spanish Cultural Heritage
- Designated: 30 June 2009

The Guadalquivir River watermills are located in Córdoba, Spain. Most of the 11 mills were founded in Moorish times, with many of them being used until the 1940s. On 30 June 2009, they were declared an Andalusian Historical Heritage site.

== Description ==
Most of the Guadalquivir water mills are near the city center of Córdoba. Two of them are about 5 km upstream and one is about 4 km downstream. They are 11 independent buildings, but most of them share a weir with other water mills. Some of the mill buildings house multiple mills.

The weirs serve to create a steady water supply. Two of them, the Weir of Culeb Azud de Culeb and the Weir of Alhadra Azud de Alhadra date from Moorish times. The weirs of the Martos, Lope García and Carbonell mills date from Medieval times.

Arab chronicles mentioned mills located on the Culeb and Alhadra weirs. We can therefore assume that the buildings on the Culeb and Alhadra weirs near the historic centre date from Moorish times. This also goes for the Martos Mill. After the Christian conquest, the mills were distributed among the nobility, the church, and military and religious orders. In the 19th century most of the mills became private property when the church assets were nationalized.

The mills were almost all used as flour mills for some time. This ended in 1942, when artisinal milling was prohibited. Already in medieval times many were adapted to also function as fulling mills. In the late nineteenth century many became small hydroelectric plants. This was also when many wheels were replaced by cast iron turbines. Later, these adapted water mills were pushed out of the market by hydroelectric plants that use a reservoir.

Some of the mills have been restored and are now used for cultural and tourism purposes. The Alegría mill houses the Museum of Paleobotany within the Royal Botanic Garden of Córdoba. The Martos mill is now the Hydrological Museum of Córdoba.

== Location ==
The names of these eleven mills are Albolafia, Alegría watermill, Carbonell, Casillas, Emmedio, Lope García, Martos, Pápalo Tierno, San Antonio, San Lorenzo, and San Rafael. From upstream to downstream, the mills are located as follows:

Name	Location	Origin	Appearance	Note
Lope García	c. 5 km upstream	Medieval	19th century	Became a flour factory in 1933
Carbonell Mill	c. 4.5 km upstream	Medieval	19th century	Became a flour factory in 19th century
Martos Mill	East city center	Moorish	Med./19th cent.	Now Hydrological Museum of Córdoba
Albolafia mill	Culeb weir	Al-Andalus	Medieval	Technically a scoop wheel
Pápalo Mill	Culeb weir	Medieval		With horizontal wheel
Enmedio Mill	Culeb weir	Medieval		With horizontal wheel
San Antonio Mill	Culeb weir	Medieval		
Alegría watermill	Alhadra weir	Medieval	Med./19th cent.	
San Rafael Mill	Alhadra weir	19th century		paper factory from 1810 to 1840
San Lorenzo Mill	Alhadra weir			Now part of San Rafael Mill
Casillas Mill	c. 4.5 km downstream		19th century	Ruinous power plant

== Gallery ==
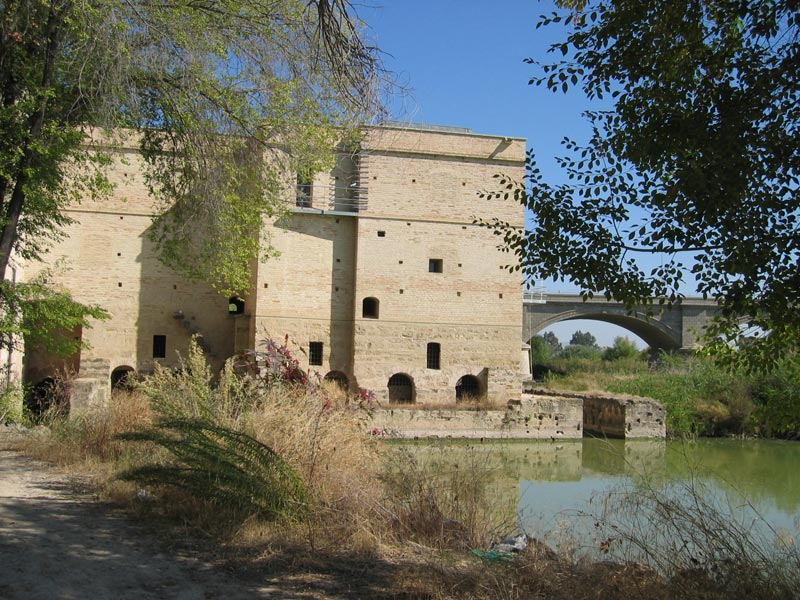
Alegría watermill

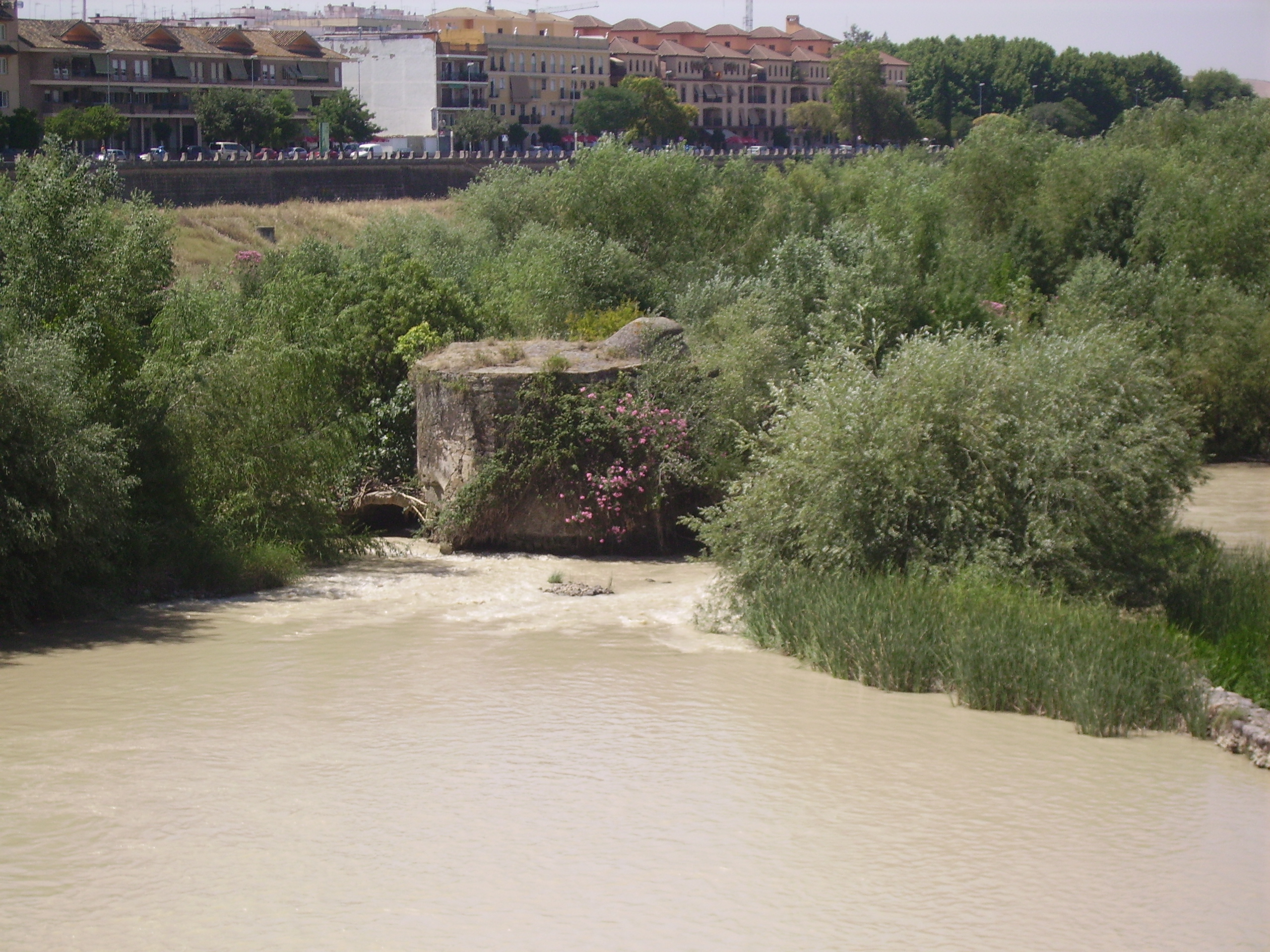
Molino de Emmedio

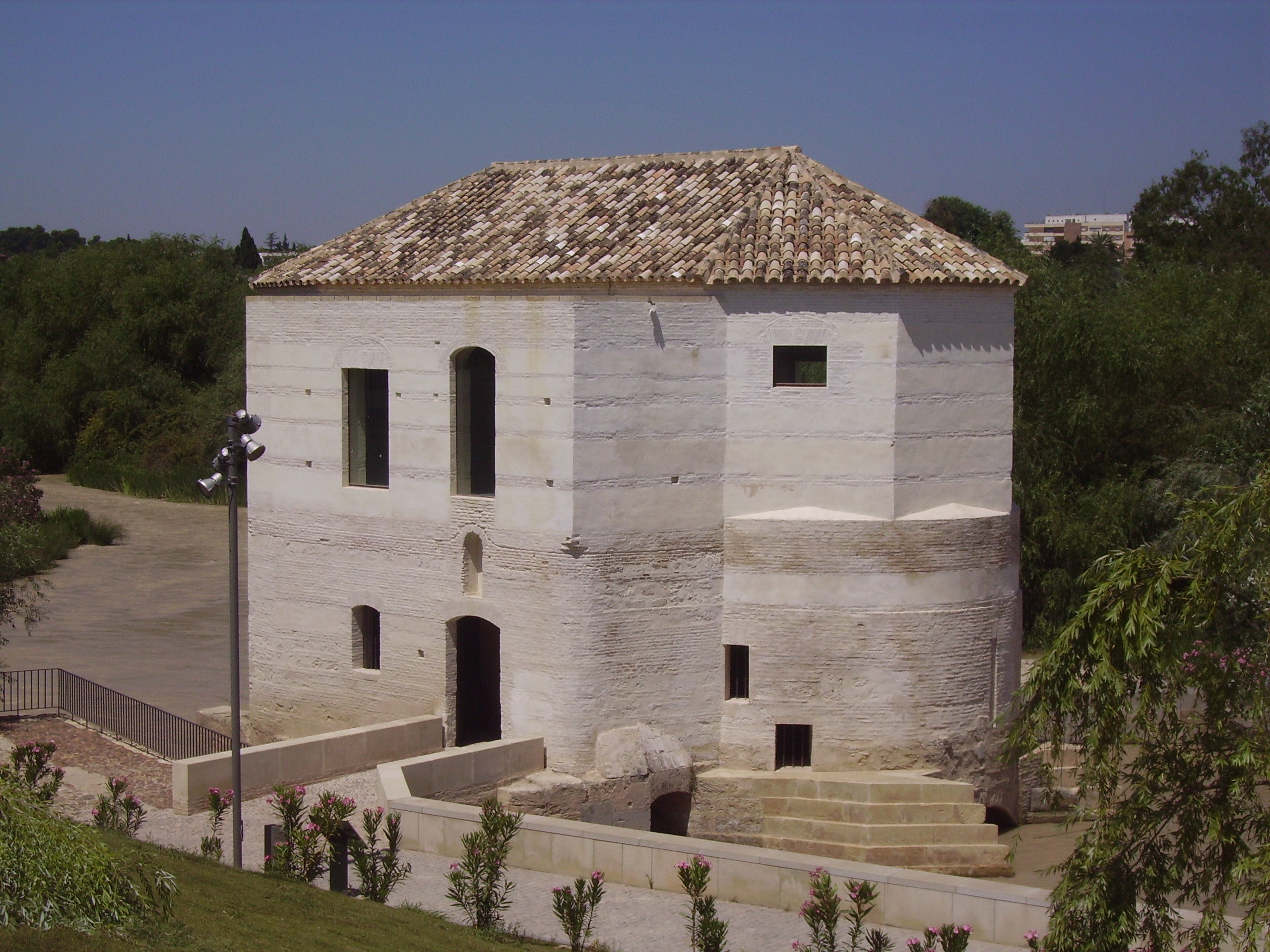
Molino de San Antonio

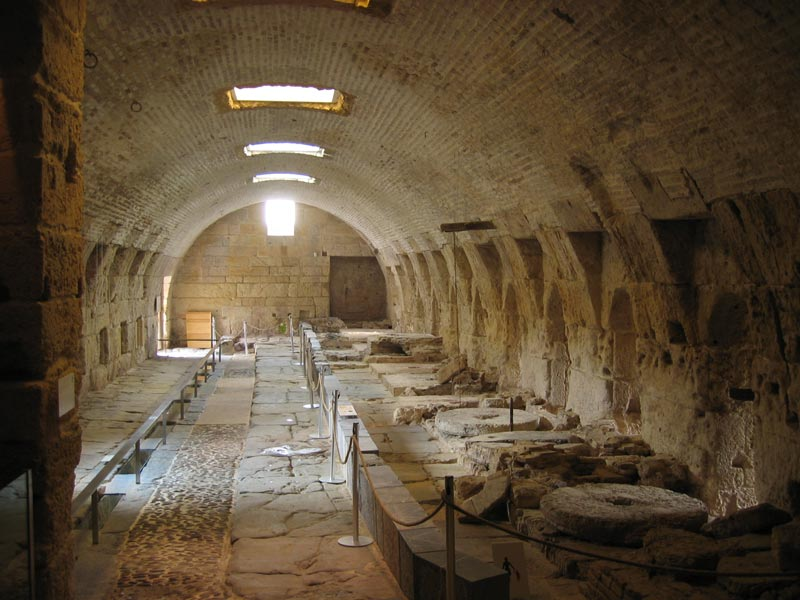
Interior of the Molino de Martos
