= Norias of Hama =

Historic water-raising machines in Hama, Syria

Coordinates: 35°8′7″N 36°45′11″E

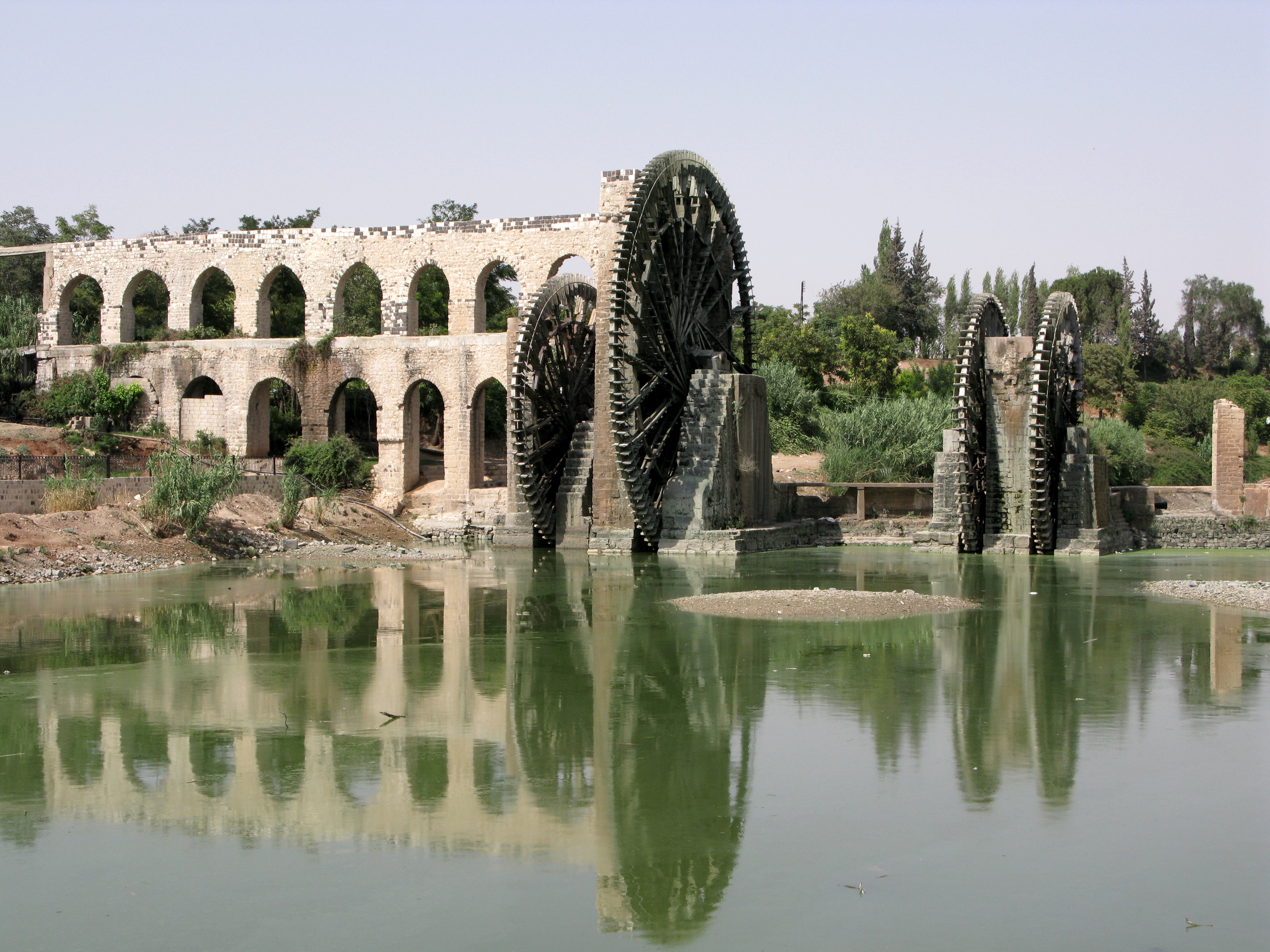
The norias of Hama on the Orontes River

The Norias of Hama (Arabic: نواعير حماة) are a series of 17 norias, historic water-raising machines for irrigation, along the Orontes River in the city of Hama, Syria. They are tall water wheels with box-like water collection compartments embedded around their rims. The Orontes’ lack of gradient at Hama, combined with its high banks, make the noria a highly effective means of drawing irrigation water. As the river flows, it pushes these water collection boxes under water, where they quickly fill up and are driven up to the top of the wheel where they empty into an aqueduct. which carries water for irrigation and drinking.

Seventeen of Hama's medieval norias have been conserved. The Noria al-Muhammadiya, a very large structure built in 1361 CE, was named a Historic Mechanical Engineering Landmark by the American Society of Mechanical Engineers in 2006.

== Early history ==
Norias were in use near Hama by at least 350 CE; they are depicted on mosaics dated to this time found at the ancient Hellenistic and Roman Syria city of Apamea on the Orontes, 30 miles / 55 km downstream.

In the mid-7th century CE, the area around Hama was conquered and absorbed into the expanding Muslim Arab state. The new administrators improved the norias and expanded their uses. Norias may have been operating in Hama proper by as early as the 9th century CE.

Many norias were operating in Hama by the late 12th century CE. Specific dates are known for two exceptionally large norias from inscriptions which state that Noria al-Muhammadiya was built in 1361 CE and Noria al-Ma’muriyya in 1453 CE.

Dates for these norias’ origins refer to its initial construction, as all functioning historic waterwheels must be repeatedly repaired and rebuilt over the centuries. By one estimate, a noria will have undergone complete replacement of its wooden parts every 15 years. In Hama, families of specialized carpenters maintain norias.

== Features of the Hama norias ==
=== The water wheels ===
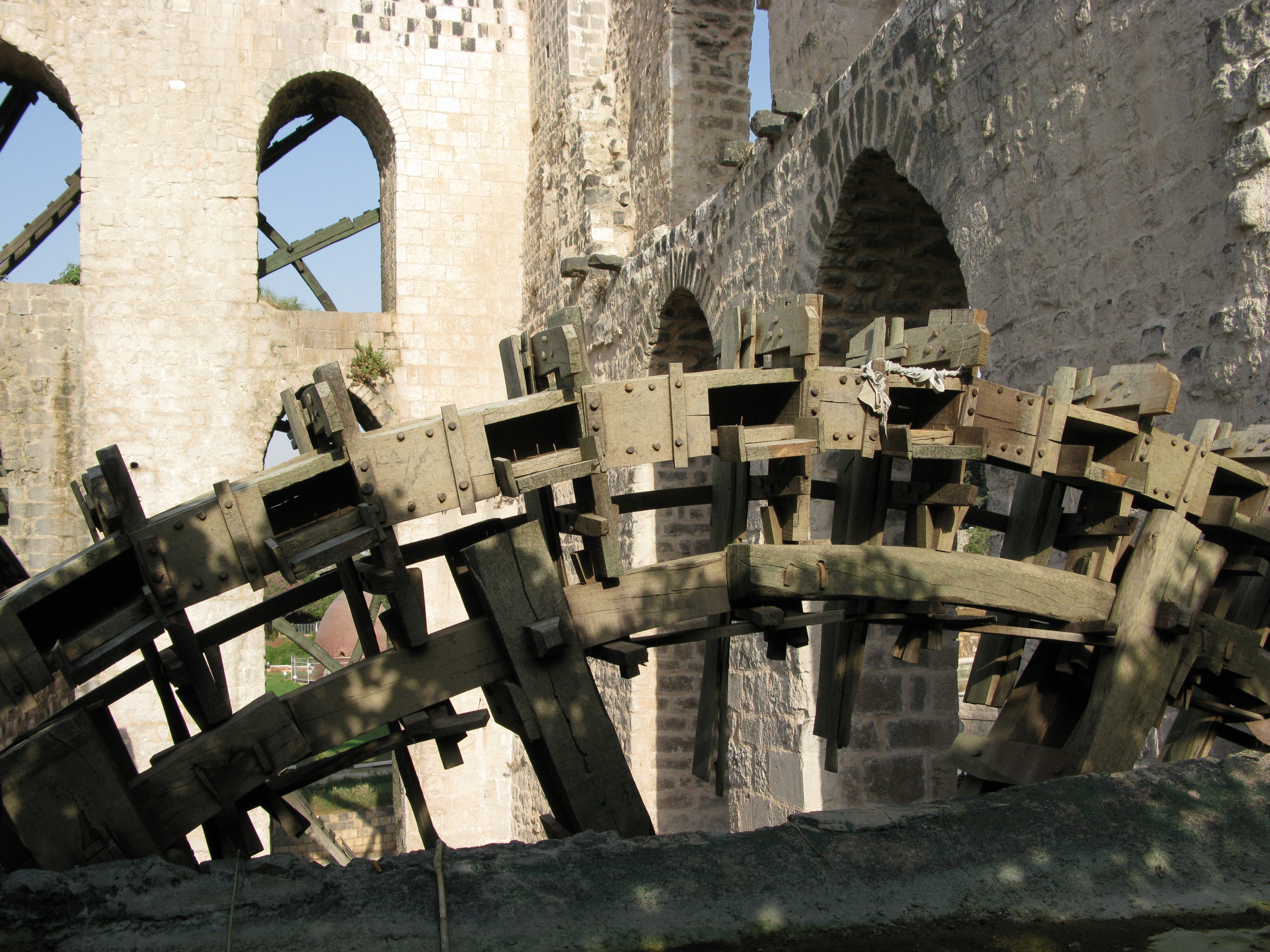
Noria of Hama. On the rim of the wheel are wooden water-collection boxes with large openings and spouts. In the foreground is the top edge of the stone aqueduct into which they pour.

The wheels are the ‘undershot’ type, driven by water flowing underneath them and pushing the wheel's paddles. In terms of height, the tallest of the norias is 21 metres (69 feet) in diameter and the smallest is 7 metres (23 feet). At least five of these norias are 17 metres (56 feet) or larger. These wheels are made from different woods for different parts. The massive axles and bearings are walnut wood, while poplar was widely used for other parts of the wheel and pine and oak have also been mentioned. Small wooden water collection compartments are embedded all along the rim of the water wheel in between the paddles with which the river drives the wheel. They are like boxes with half of one side open and with a spout whereby the water pours out at the highest point of rotation (see close-up photo below). Most Hama norias have a water collection box between every pair of paddles. But on some they are more widely spaced, for instance one box between every five paddles. In water-bearing capacity, across different norias the boxes range from 4 to 12 litres (1 to 3 US gallons). The water delivery of Hama's norias ranges between 50,000 and 200,000 litres per hour, depending on a noria's size (13,200 to 52,800 US gallons). Brief descriptions of each of 14 norias in Hama are provided in the report by the American Society of Mechanical Engineers concerning its designation of the Noria al-Muhammadiya as a Historic Mechanical Engineering Landmark.

=== The weirs ===
Hama's norias are always immediately downstream from a weir, a low dam which ensures that river power is concentrated through a channel leading to the noria's wheel. When river levels are low, all water may flow through the noria channel in the weir; when the river is high, surplus water simply flows over the weir. There are often additional channels in these weirs and sluice gates to fine tune river pressure on the water wheel and hence the speed with which a noria turns. Al Dbiyat's description of the Hama norias contains a diagram which conveys these features clearly. Sometimes two, three or even four norias share the same weir, with one or two norias on each side of the river. This clustering of norias is evident on Al Dbiyat's map of the Hama norias and to a discerning viewer on satellite view maps of Hama. Sometimes a weir is constructed at an angle to a noria so as to concentrate river power to the maximum on the channel leading to the wheel.

=== The aqueducts ===
The norias discharge water into aqueducts built on tall stone arches. To catch the water, each aqueduct has a very short section parallel to the water wheel and the river. This joins at 90 degrees the main section of the aqueduct, which leads away from the river and was sometimes many hundreds of metres long. Some aqueducts receive water from two norias of the same height, one on each side of the short section parallel to the water wheel. Much of the aqueducts’ length has now been demolished and today few aqueducts continue very far.

=== Water sharing systems ===
When the norias were being used for irrigation, the aqueducts eventually fed into water channels which each supplied multiple fruit and vegetable gardens. While most Hama norias were owned by wealthy landowners, their costs, maintenance and their water were shared on an orderly collective basis by each noria's water users. Such systems for orderly sharing of water are widely practised in traditional Muslim societies. Gardeners often timeshare the water through quickly adjusting small makeshift dams of stones and rags which direct the flow at branches of water channels.

== The Noria al-Muhammadiya ==
This gigantic wheel is 21 metres (69 feet) in diameter. It was built to supply water to the Great Mosque of Hama one kilometre away (0.63 mile) and it also supplied a public hammam (bath-house) and fountains, houses, and gardens nearby. A construction date of 1361 CE is established by an inscription on its aqueduct, stating year 763 of the Islamic calendar.

This noria has 120 water collection boxes embedded in its rim. They raise 200,000 litres of water per hour (52,800 US gallons). The wheel takes one minute to complete a revolution, much longer than smaller norias.

To drive a wheel bearing such a weight of water, an extraordinarily long weir at a very acute angle was built to concentrate the power of the river on the base of the wheel. This arrangement can be seen clearly on satellite view maps of Hama.

For nearly 500 years, the Noria al-Muhammadiya was the tallest waterwheel in the world. In 1854 it was surpassed by the Laxey Wheel, a mine-pumping waterwheel on the Isle of Man, an island between England and Ireland. The Laxey Wheel is only marginally taller, with a diameter of 22.1 metres (73 feet).

== From irrigation devices to heritage attractions ==
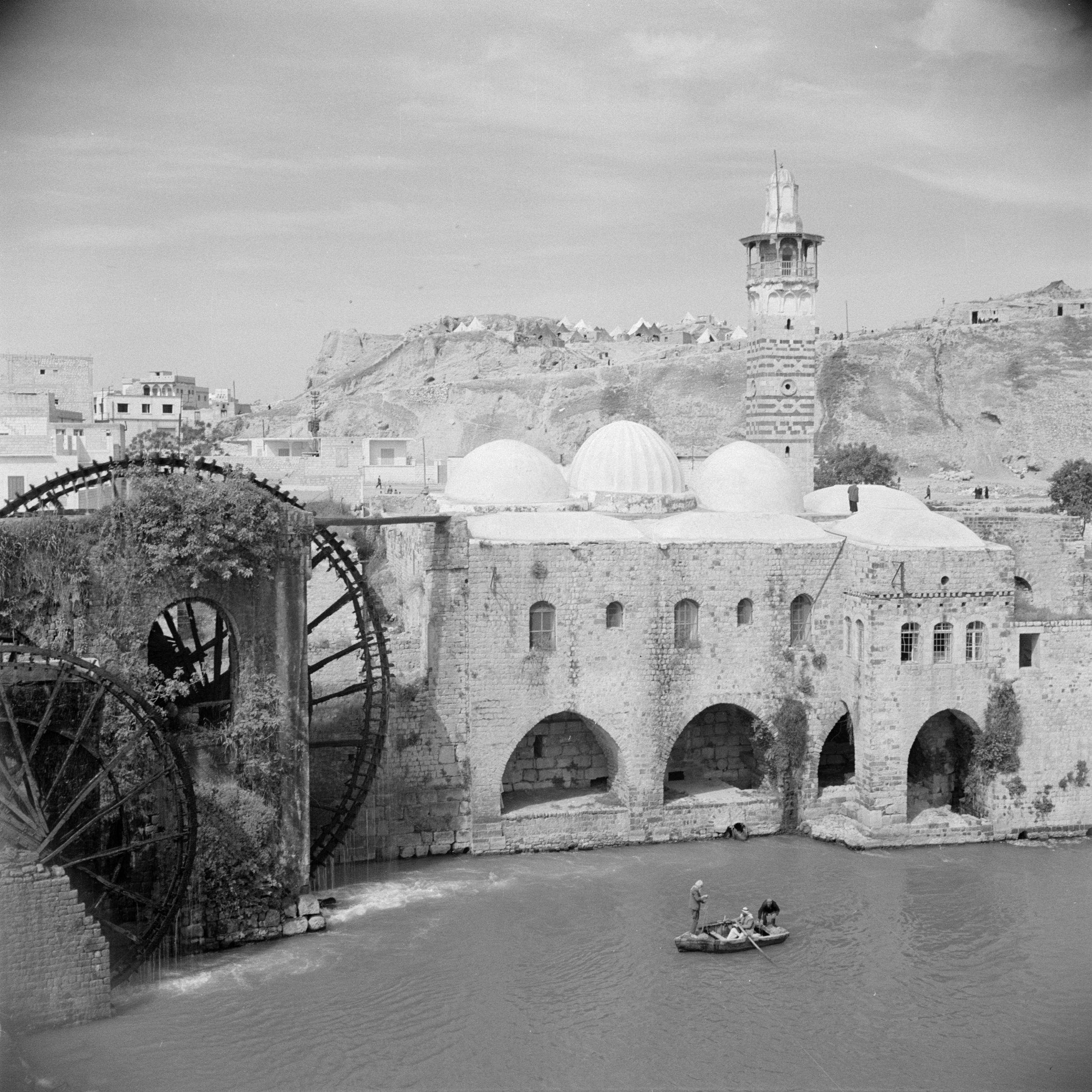
Norias in 1950

From the 1930s to late 1950s Hama's norias were competing with new irrigation pumps driven by petrol or diesel engines. Motorised pumps offered entrepreneurial farmers a means to get extra water to grow more food for expanding populations. A severe blow to the norias came in 1960 with the building of the Rastan dam upstream from Hama. This reduced water levels in the Orontes so that for several months of the year Hama's norias could no longer operate and motorised pumps became the only means for continuous irrigation. Spells of non-use causes the wood in the norias to dry, shrink and crack, which makes maintenance costly. By 1970 the number of norias in use had fallen to eight, from the 20 noted by Danish archaeologists in Hama in the 1930s. Between 1977 and 1981 six norias were restored.

In February 1982 the army of Syria's first Baathist dictator, Hafez al-Assad, launched a massive attack on Hama to crush an armed uprising by the Muslim Brotherhood. For three weeks the city was bombed by aeroplanes, shelled by artillery and tanks, and finally large areas were demolished with dynamite and bulldozers. Many thousands of Hama citizens were killed. Heritage buildings like Hama's Great Mosque were levelled to the ground and large parts of historic Hama were rendered wholly unrecognisable. According to Hafez al-Assad's favoured British biographer, “about a third of the historic inner city was demolished…. The whole of Hama was reshaped on a grand scale”. Concerning impact on Hama's norias, information is scarce because the Assad government firmly discouraged mention of the 1982 events. According to a non-government source, it seems that the wooden norias themselves did not suffer widespread damage and were turning again within months. An important unanswered question is whether it was in 1982 that the norias’ stone aqueducts suffered the extensive demolition which now precludes any useful delivery of water.

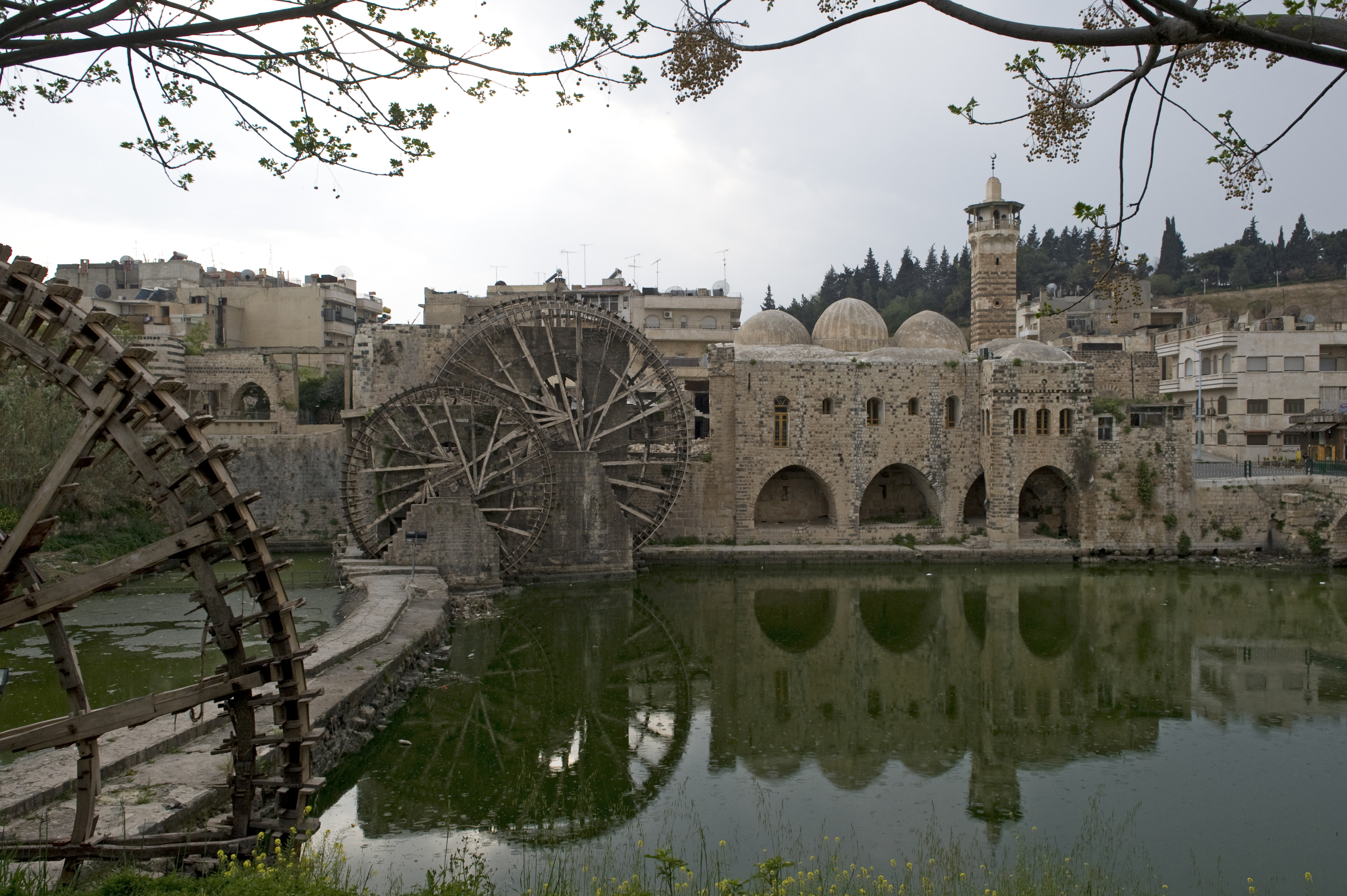
In 2009

The Assad government selectively rebuilt a limited part of historic Hama, like the Great Mosque, and landscaped or redeveloped the rest. The norias played an important part in the government's promotion of Hama as a tourist destination. The restoration of norias continued, reaching a peak in 1988 when seven norias were restored. The result has been 17 norias which rotate and raise water but cannot deliver it far because their aqueducts are now cut short. They function as a popular heritage attraction, floodlit during events like the Hama Spring Festival when the Orontes flows well and the norias can turn. By day or night they can be visually spectacular, catching light in the curtains of spray dripping from their water-boxes or casting huge rotating shadows. Sound wise, many of Hama's norias emit the powerful groaning, droning or buzzing sounds from their thick wooden axles, which gave norias their name. A time-honoured sport among Hama youths is to ride on moving norias, sometimes diving into the river from the top, as displayed in an on-line video from 2005. Much of the illustration and information now available about Hama's norias derives from these 17 norias during the period between the 1980s and the 2011 Syrian civil war. In 1999 the Syrian government applied to UNESCO for the norias of Hama to be designated a World Heritage Site.

== Hama’s norias and the Syrian civil war ==
Hama's norias were largely spared damage during the civil war which began in 2011. Since Hama was famous as a conservative and militant Sunni Muslim city, where hatred of the secular Baathist dictatorship had been intensified by the 1982 massacre, it was an expected focal point for rebellion. Accordingly, the dictatorship of Bashar Assad made strenuous efforts to retain control of Hama from the outset. In July and August 2011 it used massive lethal force against large crowds of demonstrators in Hama. Subsequently, the Assad government retained control of the city so Hama never suffered the air raids which the government inflicted on areas controlled by its opponents.

Most of Hama's norias have survived. The American Association for the Advancement of Science compared pre-war satellite photos of 10 noria sites in Hama with those from 2014 and concluded that no major damage had occurred. However, one noria was burned deliberately in 2014, some have been pillaged for timber, and others are suffering from lack of maintenance. A mid-2020 article in the on-line English language magazine Arab Weekly interviewed traditional noria craftsmen who were restoring Hama's Noria al-Muhammadiya and also a Hama official responsible for the norias. While local citizen initiatives to revive the norias were underway, it was proving difficult for lack of money for materials and a serious shortage of suitably skilled traditional noria craftsmen, owing to death or emigration during the conflict.

== Gallery ==
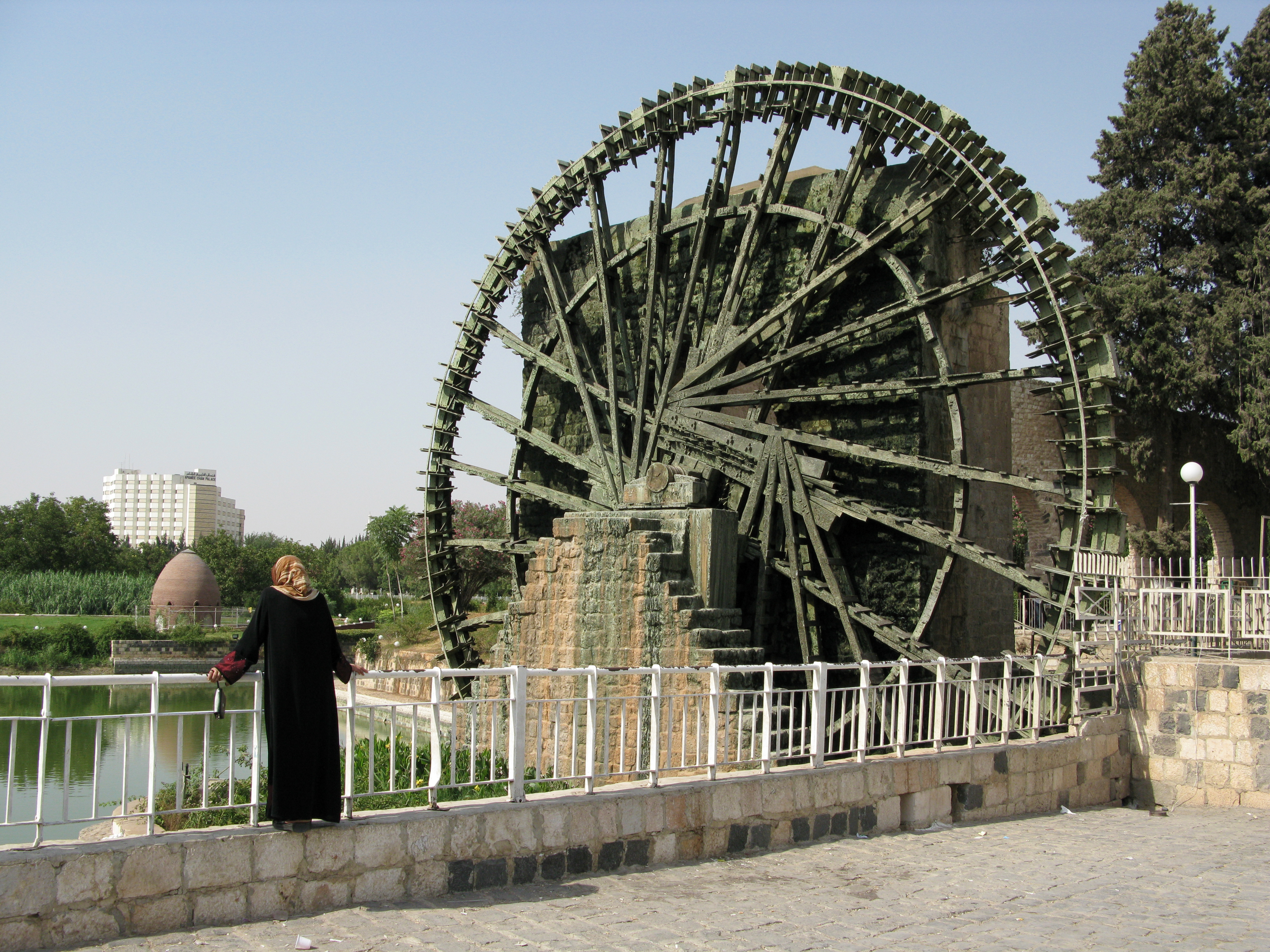
Large noria of Hama

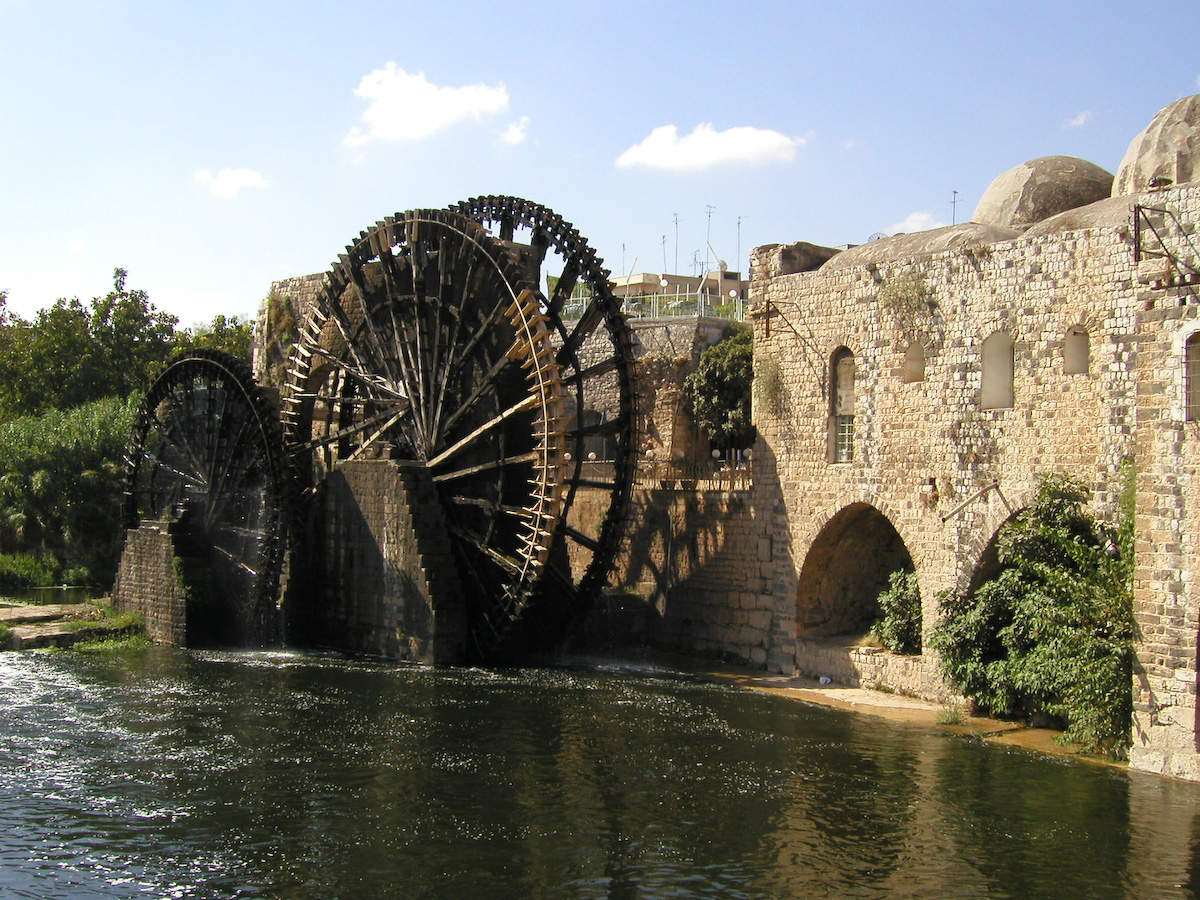
Norias of Hama

Video and sound of Noria in Hama. Note water-collection boxes at every fifth paddle on the wheel's rim.

The Water Wheel of Hama

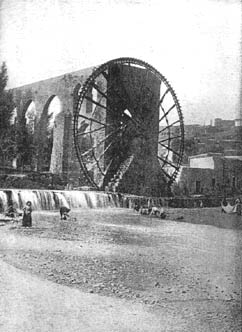
Al-Na‘urah al-Muhammadiyah at the beginning of the 20th century
