= Albolafia =

Islamic era watermill in Córdoba, Spain

Coordinates: 37°52′36.4″N 4°46′47.9″W

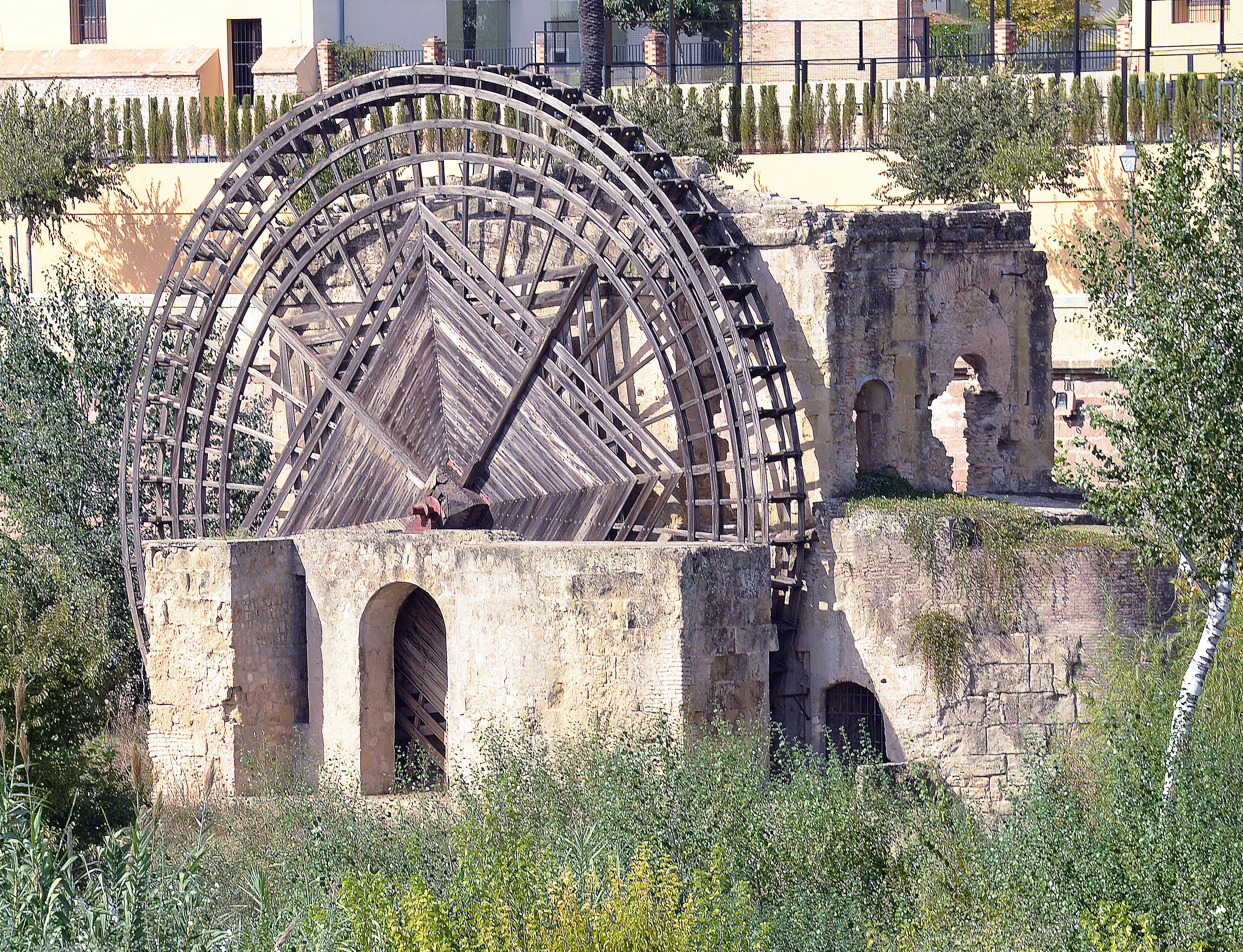
The Albolafia's noria today

The Albolafia, also known as the Molino de la Albolafia in Spanish ('the Albolafia's mill'), is a medieval noria (or waterwheel) on the Guadalquivir River in the historic center of Córdoba, Spain. It is one of several historic watermills of Cordoba and is located close to the Roman Bridge and to the Christian Alcazar. It is commonly believed to date from the Islamic era of the city, though its exact origins are uncertain.

== Etymology ==
According to Spanish scholar Felix Hernández Giménez, the name Albolafia, with an Arabic meaning equivalent to "good luck" or "good health", came from an architect called Abu l-Afiya who renovated and improved the noria in the 12th century. The name Abu al-Afiya is also attributed to "a Jewish merchant tasked to create a more efficient chain pump that would allow for easier transportation of water to Alcazar Palace Gardens by Abd al-Rahman II."

The word noria, in turn, is derived from Arabic nā‘ūra (ناعورة), which comes from the Arabic verb meaning to "groan" or "grunt", in reference to the sound it made when turning.

== History ==
=== Origins ===
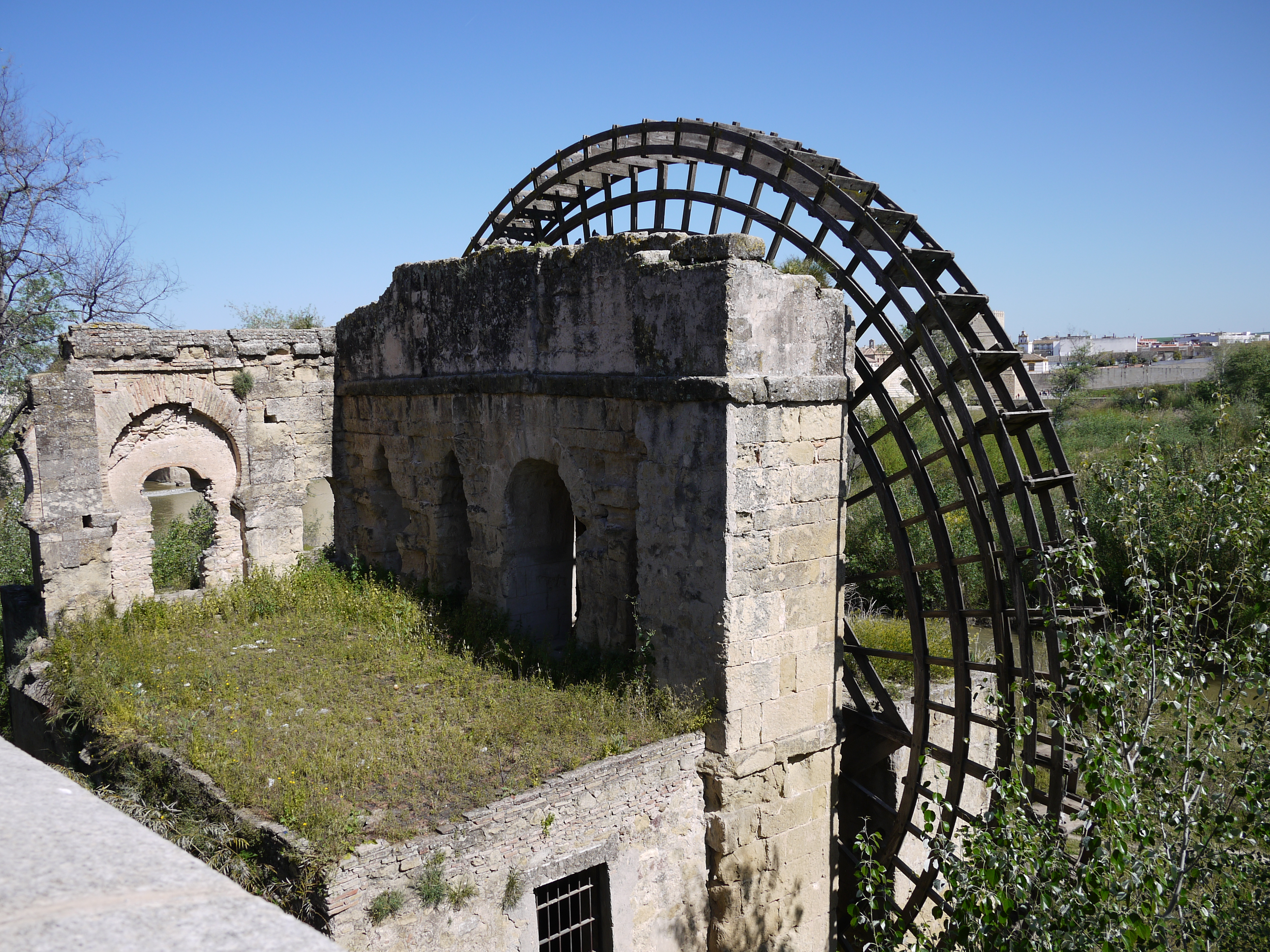
View of the noria from the city side: the horseshoe arch on the left is all that remains of the former aqueduct which brought water from the wheel to the palace

The exact history and origins of the Noria of Albolafia are not clear, although it is known that norias of this kind were a common feature of hydraulic technology across much of the historic Islamic world, including Al-Andalus. The Albolafia noria may well have Roman foundations as Romans also used hydraulic mills on the river. Four Roman mills are believed to have existed here and were connected by a weir that helped to control the water and direct it to the mills.

Some authors cite the Albolafia's origins as early as 9th century at the time of Abd ar-Rahman II, who was responsible for improving the gardens of the Alcázar (royal palace) and improving the city's water supply. In particular, the 16th-century writer Ambrosio de Morales claimed that the waterwheel existed in the early 9th century, but it's unclear what evidence he had to support this date. Sources from the 10th century mention the existence of water mills along this part of the Guadalquivir River. The Moroccan historian Ibn Idhari, writing in 1306, likewise claimed that a large noria was built here in the 10th century (presumably during the time of Abd ar-Rahman III).

Modern scholars have differed on the most likely origins of the structure. Leopoldo Torres Balbás, a 20th-century Spanish scholar, supported earlier claims by Lévi-Provençal that the noria was built in 1136-37 by Tashufin, the Almoravid governor of Cordoba during the reign of Ali ibn Yusuf. This 12th-century Almoravid origin is considered one of the most plausible and frequently repeated hypotheses. Manuel Ocaña Jiménez, another 20th-century scholar, believed that the 9th-century ruler Abd ar-Rahman II was most likely responsible for its construction. More recently, archeologists Alberto León Muñoz and Alberto Javier Montejo Córdoba agree with this, arguing that 19th-century photographs of the structure (before later changes) show architectural elements characteristic of the 9th century and indicative of a construction during the reigns of Abd ar-Rahman II or his successor, Muhammad I. Felix Hernández Giménez, who restored the structure in the 20th century, claimed that large parts of the structure could be dated to the time of Alfonso XI in the 14th century, with additional restorations in the 15th century. Adding to this, Ricardo Córdoba de la Llave argues that historic Muslim sources are not explicit in their mention of the Albolafia noria in particular and that the evidence of the building's masonry and of nearby medieval structures suggests that the current structure was built in the 14th century, though it could have been a reconstruction over an earlier Islamic noria.

=== Later history ===
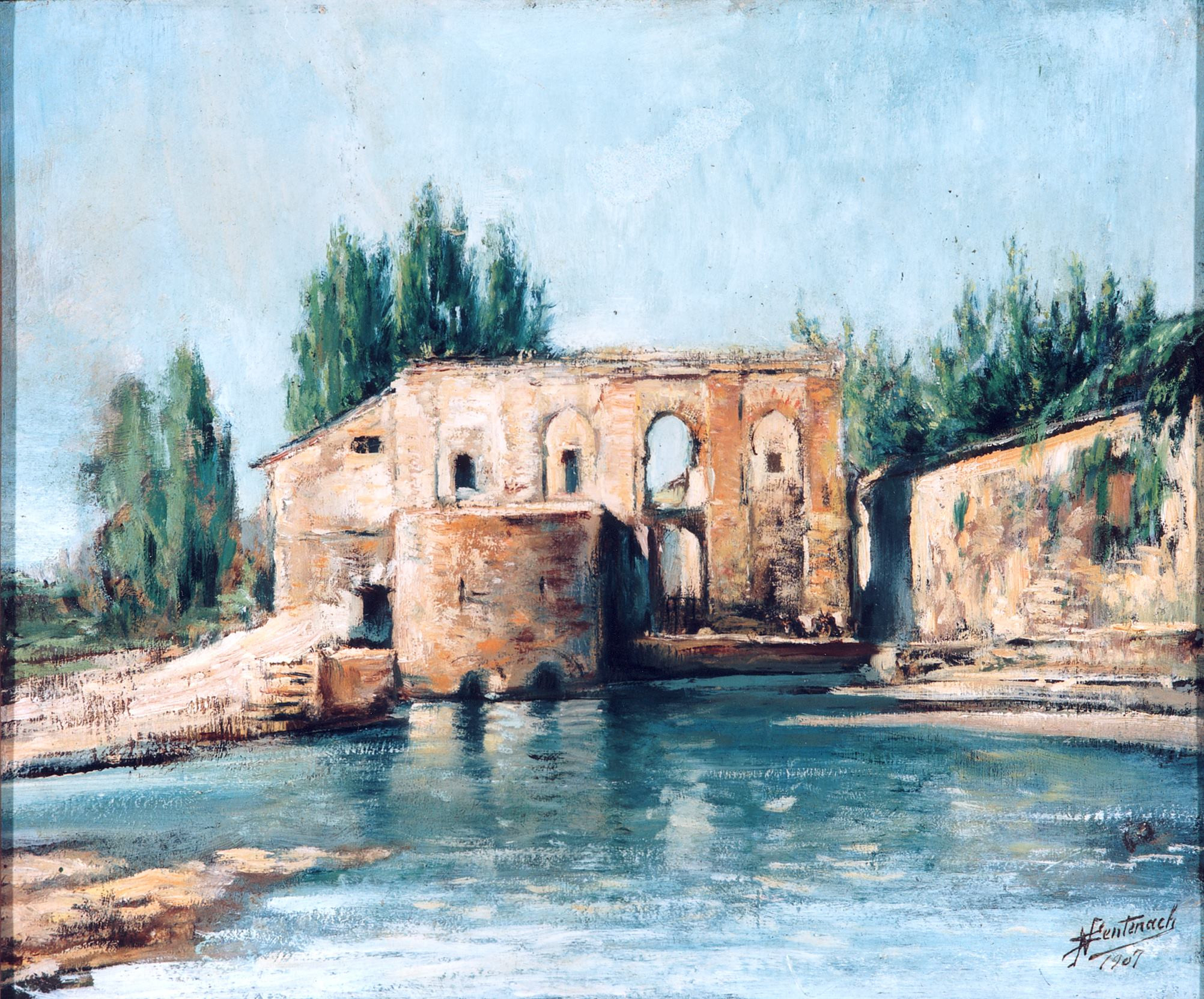
The Albolafia mill in a 1907 painting. The arches of the former aqueduct are visible on the right side and a house for the more recent mill is attached on the left side; but both elements were demolished in the 20th century.

The noria was clearly featured in some 14th-century seals of the council of Cordoba that depict the city's riverbank along with the Mosque-Cathedral. The wheel of the noria was dismantled in 1492 on the orders of Queen Isabella, who complained of the noise it made as she lay sick inside the Christian-era Alcázar. It is possible that the creation of new water supplies also made the noria redundant or dispensable.

At some point in the 16th or 17th century, the noria was converted into a flour mill which remained operational until the 20th century. Between 1904 and 1910, a dam was built around the area of the mill in order to contain the river during floods. The dam's construction resulted in the demolition of a part of the historic mill building as well as the demolition of two of the three remaining arches of the former aqueduct which delivered water from the wheel to the city.

In the 1960s, the architect and scholar Felix Hernández Giménez was tasked by the city council to conduct a restoration of the noria, including a reconstruction of its medieval waterwheel. In order to rebuild the waterwheel, Hernández Giménez had to demolish more of the former mill, in particular a house that had been built on the side of the structure facing the river. This uncovered the original southern facade of the noria building, though Hernández Giménez had to further expand the central arch of the structure in order to create fittings for the axis of the replica wheel. In the decades after this restoration, the wooden wheel began to warp out of shape, and between 1993 and 1994 it was replaced again with an exact replica.

== Description and function ==
The noria's original purpose is believed to have been to raise water from the river and into an aqueduct that delivered water to the city and to the nearby Alcazar (royal palace). The wheel, which has a diameter of 15 meters, was propelled by the force of the river's current. Buckets around its circumference collected water and dropped it into the aqueduct's channel.

After the 15th century, following the original wheel's dismantlement, the noria was no longer used to supply water and the aqueduct which connected it to the city was dispensable. A part of the aqueduct, consisting of three horseshoe arches, was still standing and attached to the structure up until the beginning of the 20th century. Today, only one of its arches, standing perpendicular to the river and to the main axis of the building, is still visible.
