= Jiaodaluo =

Foot-operated flour sifter

Jiaodaluo or Foot Treadle Flour Sifter (Chinese: 脚打罗; pinyin: jiaodaluó; lit. 'foot hit sift') were foot-operated pedal implements that were used to sift flour in China. The foot treadle flour sifter had long been in use in China. An illustration of the machine is depicted in Song Yingxing's encyclopedia Tiangong Kaiwu written in 1637.
