= De Sweachmermolen, Langweer =

Smock mill in Friesland, Netherlands

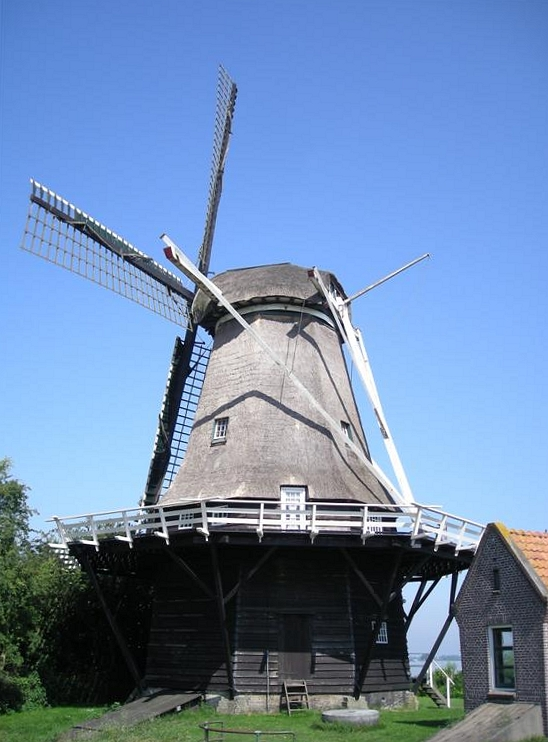
- De Sweachmermolen, June 2007.

Origin
- Mill name: De Swechmermolen
- Mill location: Boarnsweachsterdyk 3, 8525 EA Langweer
- Coordinates: 52°57′37″N 5°43′55″E
- Operator(s): Stichting Langweerder Molen
- Year built: 1782

Information
- Purpose: Drainage mill and corn mill
- Type: Smock mill
- Storeys: Three-storey smock
- Base storeys: Two-storey base
- No. of sails: Four sails
- Type of sails: Common sails
- Windshaft: Cast iron
- Winding: Tailpole and winch
- Auxiliary power: Electric motor
- No. of pairs of millstones: One pair
- Type of pump: Archimedes' screw

De Sweachmermolen is a smock mill between Langweer and Boornzwaag, Friesland, Netherlands which was built in 1782. The mill has two functions: it is a drainage mill and a corn mill. It has been restored to working order as a drainage mill and is listed as a Rijksmonument, number 13241.

== History ==
De Sweachmermolen was built in 1782 as a corn mill for Frans Julius Johan van Eijsinga. It was later converted so that it could also drain the Grote Polder Langweer, Dijken en Boornzwaag. The mill previously had four patent sails. On 12 August 1925, an electric motor was installed in the mill to drive the Archimedes' screw. The mill then became derelict. Through T.A.J. van Eijsinga, an influential member of De Hollandsche Molen (English: Dutch Mills Society), the mill was acquired in 1949 by Stichting tot instandhouding van de Langweerder molen (English: Society for the preservation of Langeweer Mill). De Sweachmermolen is now used as a holiday home, the base and lowest storey of the smock having been converted. Income from letting the mill is put towards its upkeep. In 1998, the mill was restored so that it could again pump water. It is not planned to restore the milling machinery. De Sweachmermolen is listed as being held in reserve for use in times of emergency. It is the only combined corn and drainage windmill in Friesland.

== Description ==
De Sweachmermolen is what the Dutch describe as a Stellingmolen. It is a three-storey smock mill on a two-storey base. The stage is at second-floor level, 5.70 metres (18 ft 8 in) above ground level. The mill is winded by tailpole and winch. The smock and cap are thatched. The sails are common sails. They have a span of 22.40 metres (73 ft 6 in). The sails are carried on a cast-iron windshaft which was cast by Gietijzer Pletterij Enthoven en Companië, The Hague, in 1896. The windshaft also carries the brake wheel, which has 58 cogs. This drives the wallower (32 cogs) at the top of the upright shaft. The great spur wheel, which has 90 cogs, drove a pair of millstones via a lantern pinion stone nut with 25 staves. At the bottom of the upright shaft the crown wheel, which has 35 cogs, drives a gearwheel with 43 cogs on the axle of the Archimedes' screw.

== Millers ==
- Frans Julius Johan van Eijsinga (1782- )
- Sipke Jolles Hoekstra (c1912/15)

== Public access ==
De Sweachmermolen is open to the public.
