= Windpump =

Wind turbine for pumping water

A windpump or drainage mill is a wind-driven device which is used for pumping water.

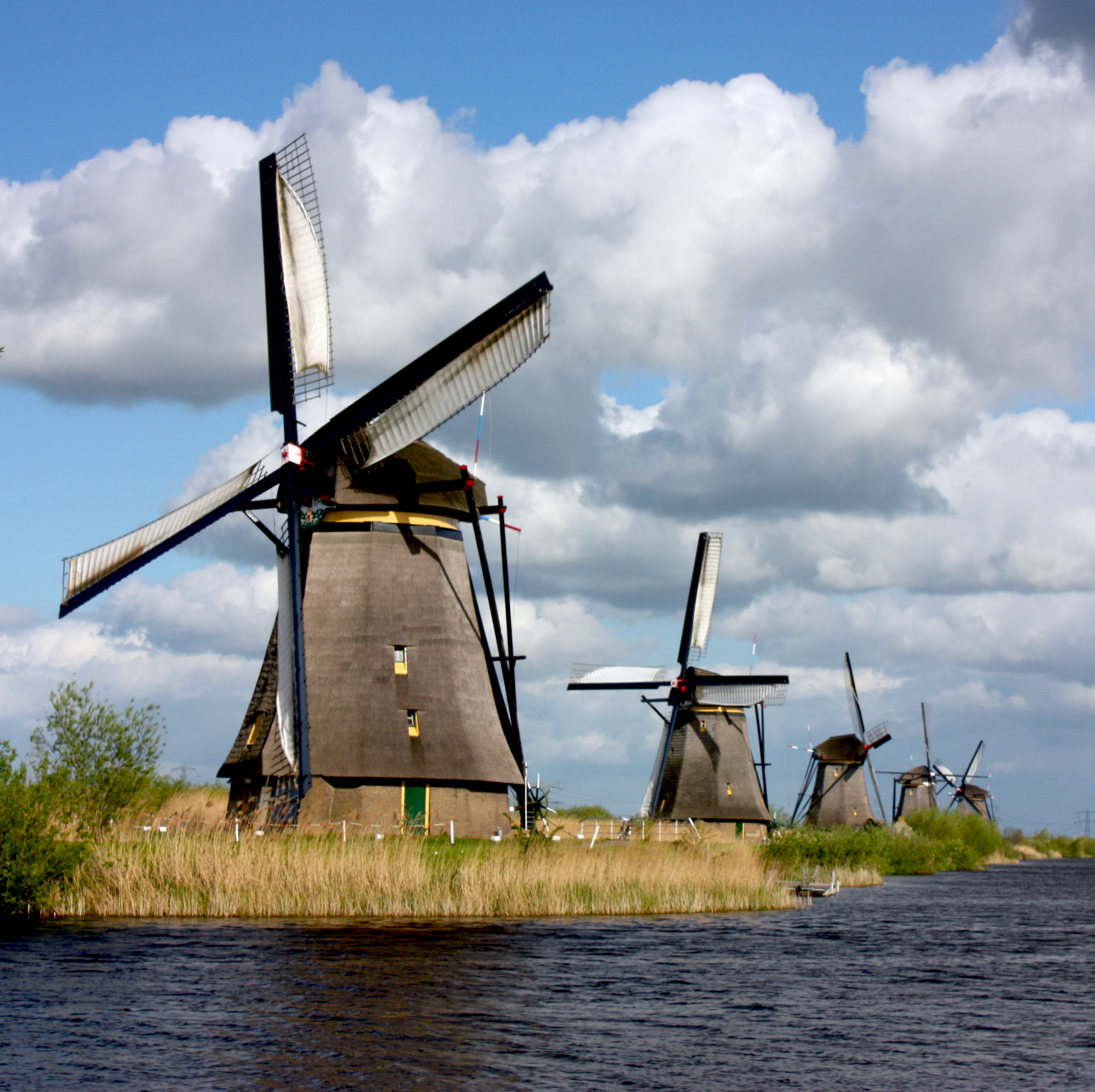
The windmills at Kinderdijk in the village of Kinderdijk, Netherlands is a UNESCO World Heritage Site

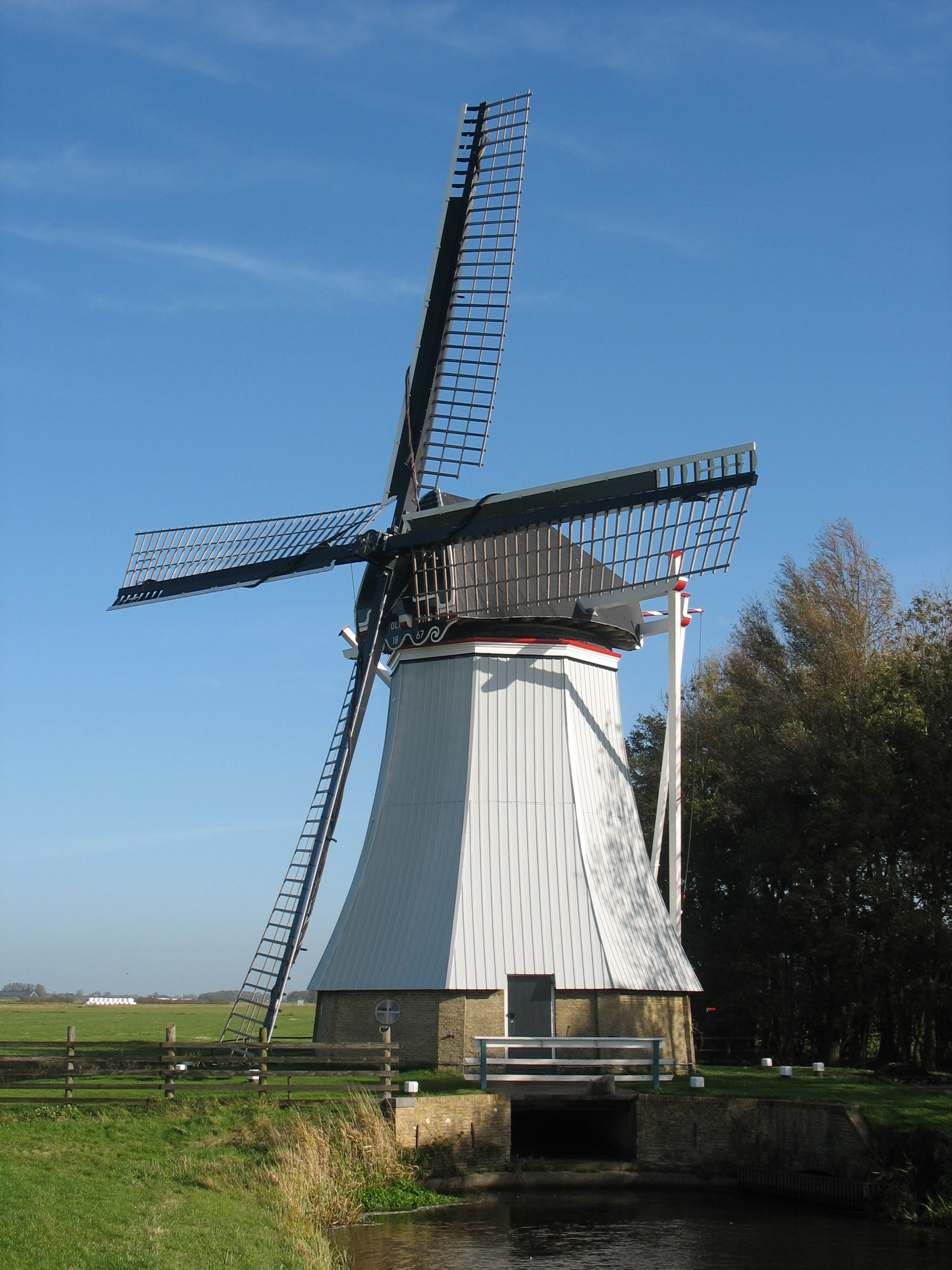
De Olifant at Burdaard, Friesland

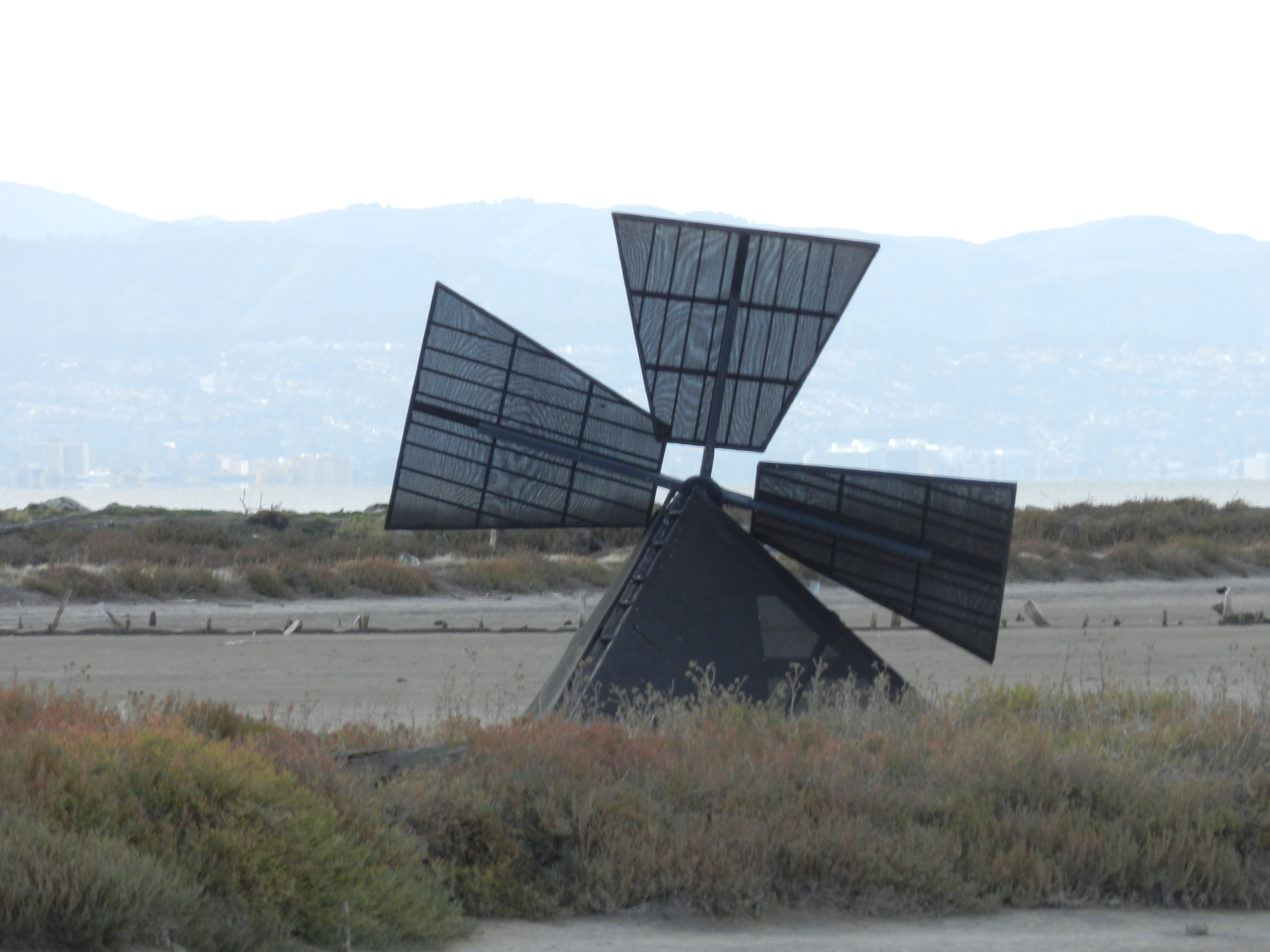
Tjasker in Hayward, California

Windpumps were used to pump water since at least the 9th century in what is now Afghanistan, Iran and Pakistan. The use of windpumps became widespread across the Muslim world and later spread to China and India. Windpumps were later used extensively in Europe, particularly in the Netherlands and the East Anglia area of Great Britain, from the late Middle Ages onwards, to drain land for agricultural or building purposes.

Simon Stevin's work in the waterstaet involved improvements to the sluices and spillways to control flooding. Windpumps were already in use to pump the water out, but in Van de Molens (On mills) he suggested improvements, including the idea that the wheels should move slowly, and a better system for meshing of the gear teeth. These improvements increased the efficiency of the windpumps used to extract water out of the polders by a factor of three. He received a patent on his innovation in 1586.

Eight- to ten-bladed windpumps were used in the Region of Murcia, Spain, to raise water for irrigation purposes. The drive from the windpump’s rotor was led down through the tower and back out through the wall to turn a large wheel known as a noria. The noria supported a bucket chain which dangled down into the well. The buckets were traditionally made of wood or clay. These windpumps remained in use until the 1950s, and many of the towers are still standing.

Early immigrants to the New World brought with them the technology of windpumps from Europe. On US farms, particularly on the Great Plains, windpumps were used to pump water from farm wells for cattle. In California and some other states, the windpump was part of a self-contained domestic water system, including a hand-dug well and a redwood water tower supporting a redwood tank and enclosed by redwood siding (tankhouse). The self-regulating farm windpump was invented by Daniel Halladay in 1854. Eventually, steel blades and steel towers replaced wooden construction, and at their peak in 1930, an estimated 600,000 units were in use, with capacity equivalent to 150 megawatts. Very large lighter windpumps in Australia directly crank the pump with the rotor of the windpump. Extra back gearing between small rotors for high wind areas and the pump crank prevents trying to push the pump rod down on the downstroke faster than it can fall by gravity; otherwise pumping too fast would lead to the pump rod buckling, making the seal of the stuffing box leak and wearing through the wall of the rising main (UK) or the drop-pipe (US) so all output would be lost.

The multi-bladed wind pump or wind turbine atop a lattice tower made of wood or steel hence became, for many years, a fixture of the landscape throughout rural America. These turbines, made by a variety of manufacturers, featured many blades so that they would turn slowly with considerable torque in moderate winds and be self-regulating in high winds. A tower-top gearbox and crankshaft converted the rotary motion into reciprocating strokes carried downward through a rod to the pump cylinder below. Today, rising energy costs and improved pumping technology are increasing interest in the use of this once-declining technology.

== Worldwide use ==
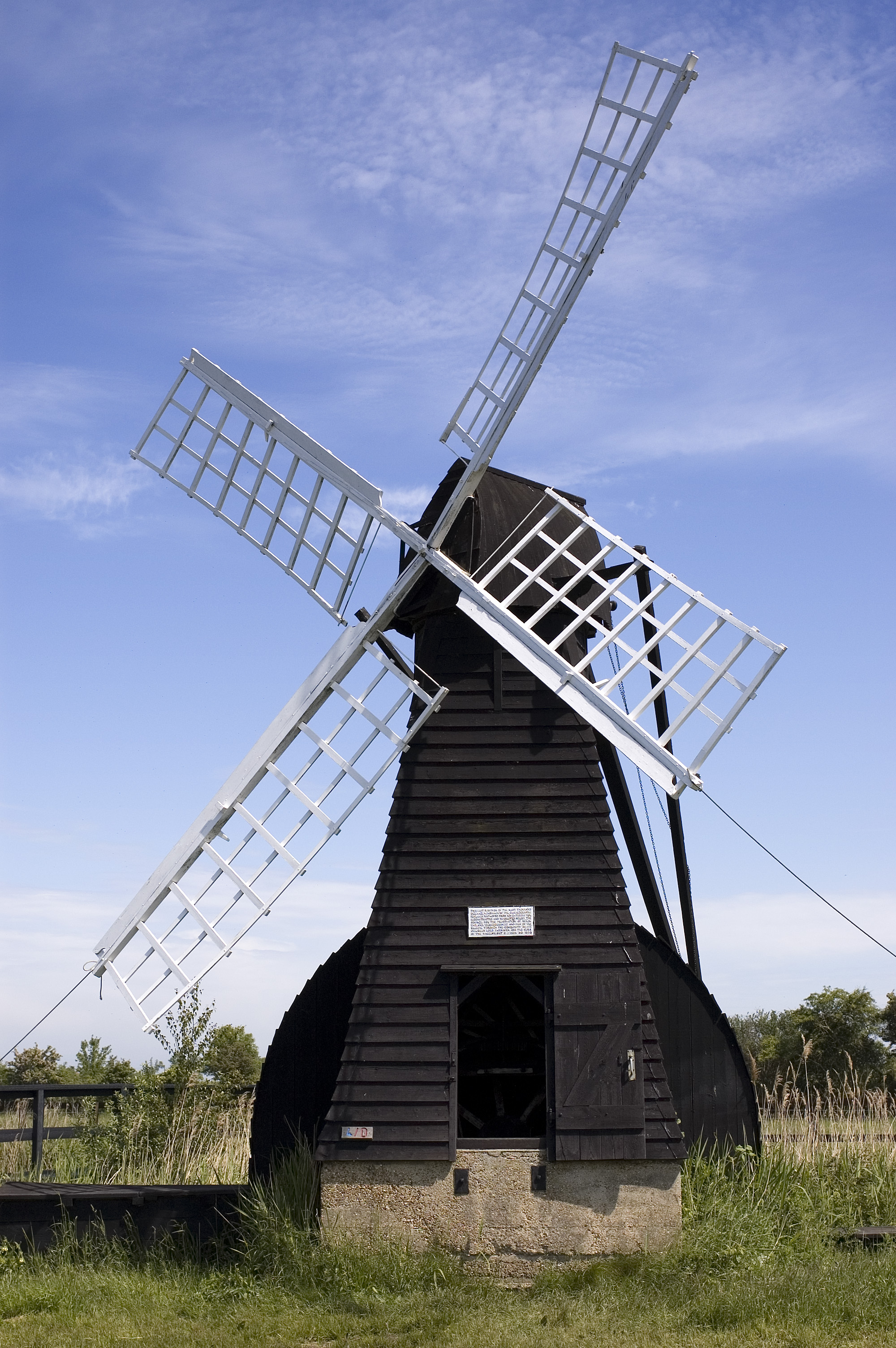
A working wooden windpump on The Fens in Cambridgeshire, UK

The Netherlands is well known for its windpumps. Most of these iconic structures are situated along the edge of polders and are frequently referred to as windmills, although they are designed to drain the land. They are particularly important as much of the country lies below sea level.

Many of these windpumps were also built in The Broads and The Fens of East Anglia for the draining of land, but most of them have since been replaced by diesel or electric powered pumps. Many of the original structures still stand in a derelict state although some have been restored.

Windpumps are used extensively in Southern Africa, Australia, and on farms and ranches in the central plains and southwest of the United States. In South Africa and Namibia thousands of windpumps are still operating. These are mostly used to provide water for human use as well as drinking water for large sheep stocks.

Kenya has also benefited from the African development of windpump technologies. At the end of the 1970s, the UK NGO Intermediate Technology Development Group provided engineering support to the Kenyan company Bobs Harries Engineering Ltd for the development of the Kijito windpumps. Bobs Harries Engineering Ltd is still manufacturing the Kijito windpumps, and more than 300 of them are operating in the whole of East Africa.

In many parts of the world, a rope pump is being used in conjunction with wind turbines. This easy-to-construct pump works by pulling a knotted rope through a pipe (usually a simple PVC pipe), causing the water to be pulled up into the pipe. This type of pump has become common in Nicaragua and other places.

== Construction ==
To construct a windpump, the bladed rotor needs to be matched to the pump. With non-electric windpumps, high solidity rotors are best used in conjunction with positive displacement (piston) pumps, because single-acting piston pumps need about three times as much torque to start them as to keep them going. Low solidity rotors, on the other hand, are best used with centrifugal pumps, waterladder pumps and chain and washer pumps, where the torque needed by the pump for starting is less than that needed for running at design speed. Low solidity rotors are best used if they are intended to drive an electricity generator; which in turn can drive the pump.

== Multi-bladed windpumps ==
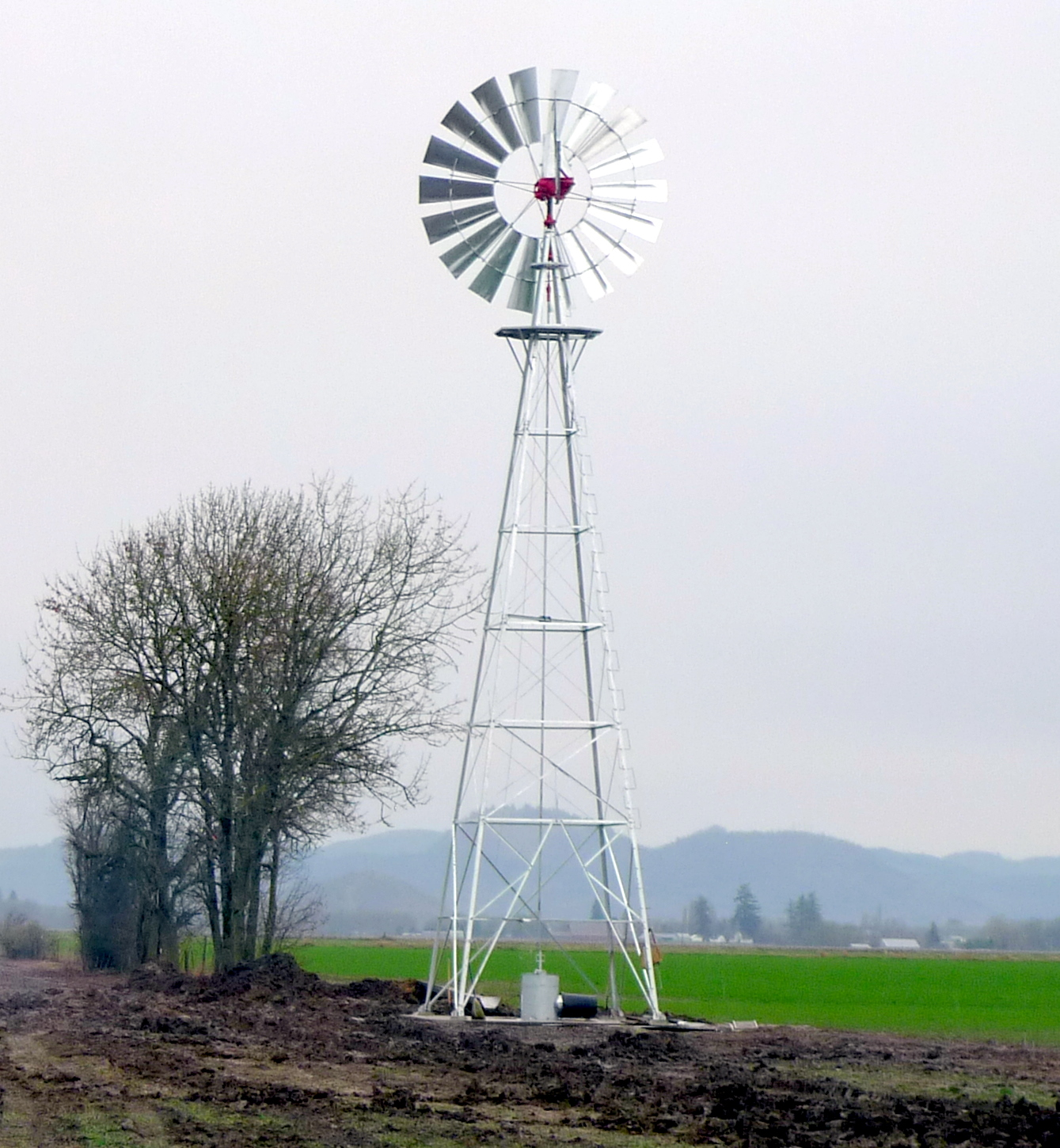
Wind powered water pump on Oak Park Farm, Shedd, Oregon.

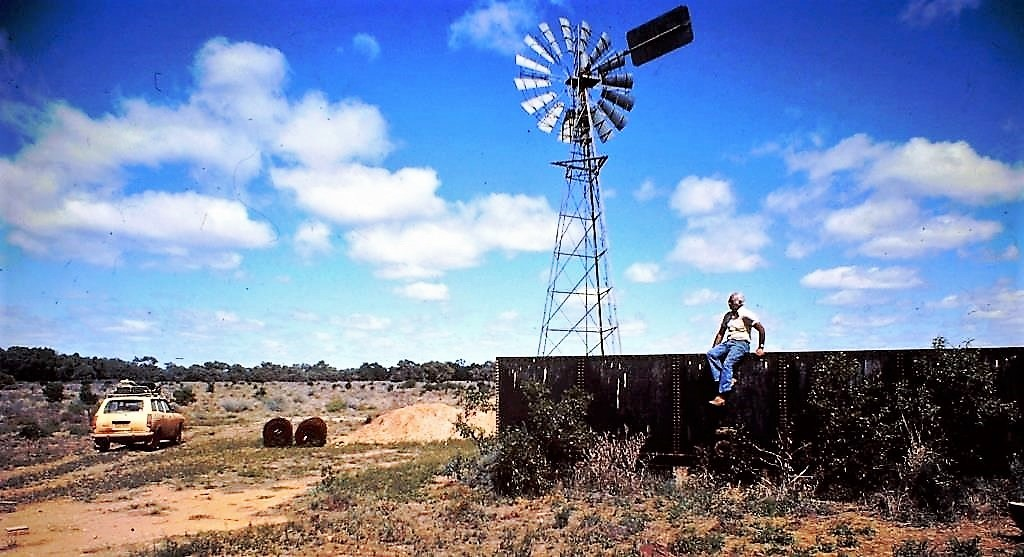
Windpump in far western NSW.

Multi-bladed wind pumps can be found worldwide and are manufactured in the United States, Argentina, China, New Zealand, South Africa, and Australia. They are commonly known in the US and Canada as "weathercocks" because they behave much like a traditional weather vane, moving with the direction of the wind (but also measuring wind speed).The Butler brand added improvements to the technology of windpumps in 1897, 1898 and 1905. With a 15 to 20 mph (24–32 km/h) wind, a 16 ft (4.8 m) diameter wind pump can lift up to 1600 US gallons (about 6.4 metric tons) of water per hour to an elevation of 100 ft. However they take a strong wind to start so they turn over the crank of the piston pump. Wind pumps require little maintenance—usually only an annual change of gear box oil. An estimated 60,000 wind pumps are still in use in the United States. They are particularly attractive for use at remote sites where electric power is not available and maintenance is difficult to provide. A common multi-bladed windpump usefully pumps with about 4%–8% of the annual windpower passing through the area it sweeps This low conversion efficiency is due to poor load matching between wind rotors and fixed-stroke piston pumps.

== Fundamental problems of multi-bladed windpumps ==
=== Inefficient rotor ===
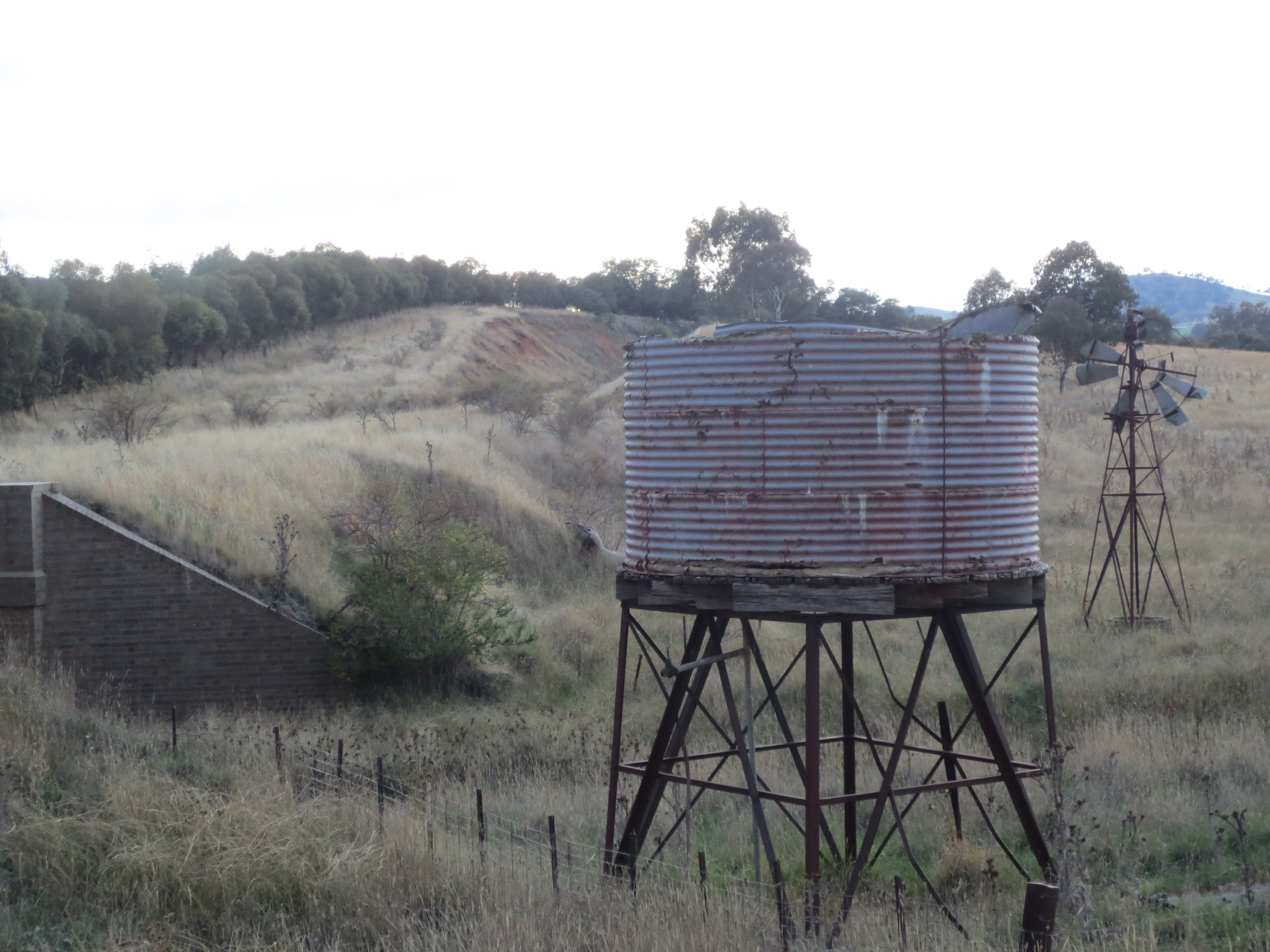
Derelict water tank with windmill in the background

The main design feature of a multi-bladed rotor is "high starting torque", which is necessary for cranking a piston pump operation. Once started, a multi-bladed rotor runs at too high a tipspeed ratio at less than its best efficiency of 30%. On the other hand, modern wind rotors can operate at an aerodynamic efficiency of more than 40% at higher tipspeed ratio for a smaller swirl added and wasted to the wind. But they would need a highly variable stroke mechanism rather than just a crank to piston pump.

=== Poor load matching ===
A multi-bladed windmill is a mechanical device with a piston pump. Because a piston pump has a fixed stroke, the energy demand of this type of pump is proportional to pump speed only. On the other hand, the energy supply of a wind rotor is proportional to the cube of wind speed. Because of that, a wind rotor runs at over speed (more speed than needed), yielding a loss of aerodynamic efficiency.

A variable stroke would match the rotor speed according to wind speed, functioning like a "variable-speed generator". The flow rate of a variable stroke windpump can be increased by a factor two times, compared to a fixed stroke windpump at the same wind speed.

=== Cyclic torque variation ===
A piston pump has a very light suction phase, but the upstroke is heavy and puts a big backtorque on a starting rotor when the crank is horizontal and ascending. A counterweight on the crank up in the tower and yawing with the wind direction can at least spread the torque to the crank descent.

== Development of improved windpumps ==
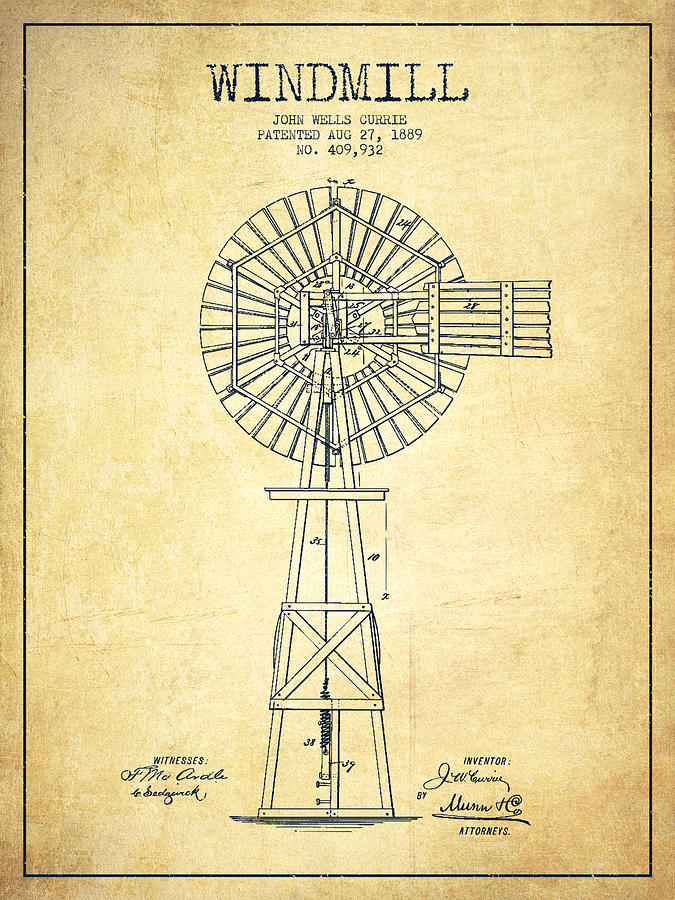
Windmill patent drawing from 1889 vintage aged

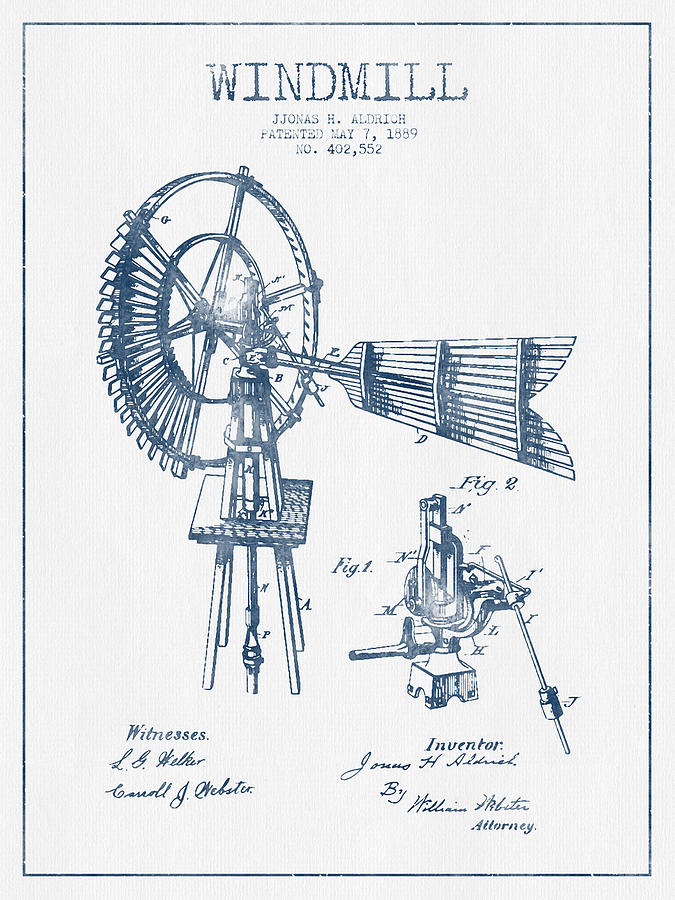
Aldrich windmill patent drawing from 1889

Although multi-bladed windpumps are based on proven technology and are widely used, they have the fundamental problems mentioned above and need a practical variable stroke mechanism.

=== USDA experiments at Texas ===
Between 1988 and 1990, a variable stroke windpump was tested at the USDA-Agriculture Research Center-Texas, based on two patented designs (Don E. Avery Patent #4.392.785, 1983 and Elmo G. Harris Patent #617.877, 1899). Control systems of the variable stroke wind pumps were mechanical and hydraulic; however, those experiments did not attract the attention of any windpump manufacturer. After experiments with this variable stroke windpump, research focused on wind-electric water pumping systems; no commercial variable stroke windpump exists yet.

=== Fluttering windpumps ===
Fluttering windpumps have been developed in Canada with a pump stroke varying strongly with amplitude to absorb all the variable power in the wind and to stop the uniblade from swinging too far beyond horizontal from its vertical mean position. They are much lighter and use less material than multiblade windpumps and can pump effectively in lighter wind regimes.

=== Variable stroke windpump ===
A Turkish engineer re-designed the variable stroke windpump technology by using modern electronic control equipment. Research began in 2004, with governmental R&D support. The first commercial new generation variable stroke wind pumps have been designed after ten years of R&D. The 30 kW variable stroke windpump design includes a Darrieus-type modern wind rotor, counterbalance and regenerative brake technology.

=== Vertical axis wind pump (VAWP) ===
Using a vertical axis wind turbine, the redirection of the turbine torque from horizontal to the vertical axis can be solved, thus creating a basic shaft connection between the turbine and the pump. The direct connection can produce a more efficient wind-pump. For example, combining the VAWP system with a high pressure (HP-VAWP) drip irrigation system can lead, with proper optimization, to two to three times higher efficiency than traditional windpumps.

== Combinations ==
=== Tjasker ===
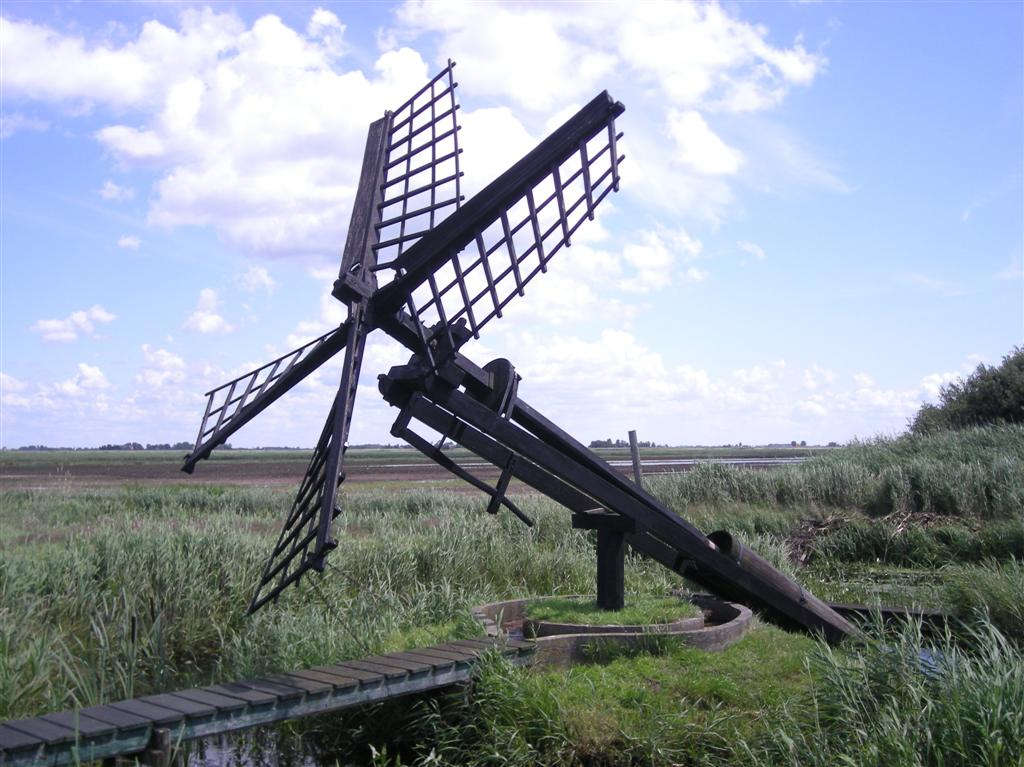
The tjasker

In the Netherlands, the tjasker is a drainage mill with common sails connected to an Archimedean screw. This is used for pumping water in areas where only a small lift is required. The windshaft sits on a tripod which allows it to pivot. The Archimedean screw lifts water into a collecting ring, where it is drawn off into a ditch at a higher level, thus draining the land.

=== Thai windpumps ===
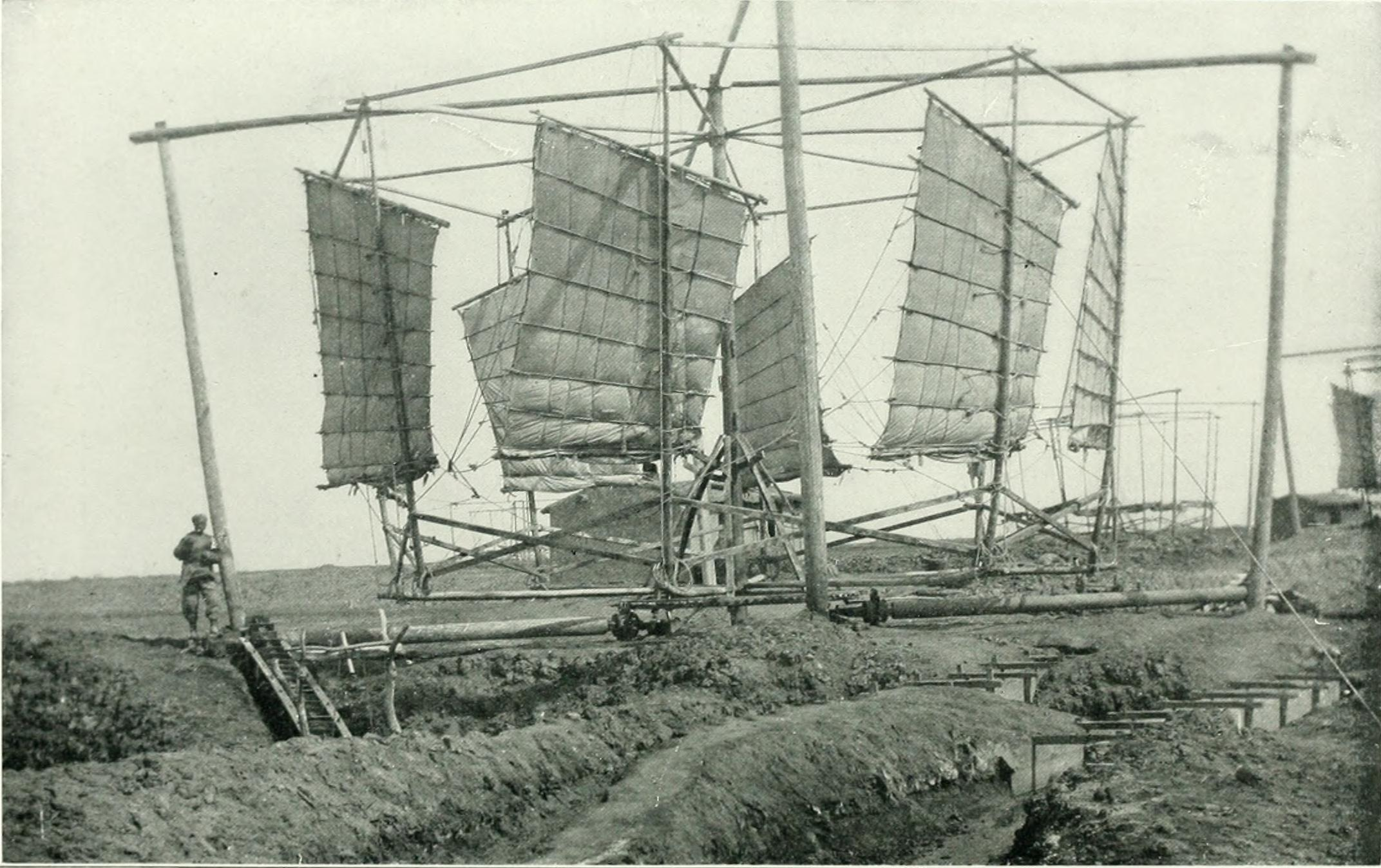
Thai windpump (Similar Chinese example shown)

In Thailand, windpumps are traditionally built on Chinese windpump designs. These pumps are constructed from wire-braced bamboo poles carrying fabric or bamboo-mat sails; a paddle pump or waterladder pump is fixed to a Thai bladed rotor. They are mainly used in salt pans, where the water lift required is typically less than one meter.

== See also ==
- Aermotor Windmill Company, an American windpump manufacturer
- Blade solidity
- Coil pump, another frequently used pump
- Loeriesfontein, Northern Cape, where there is a museum dedicated to water-pumping windmills
- Tjasker on Dutch Wikipedia
- Wind turbine
- Zaanse Schans
