= Louche =

Chinese animal-drawn seed drill

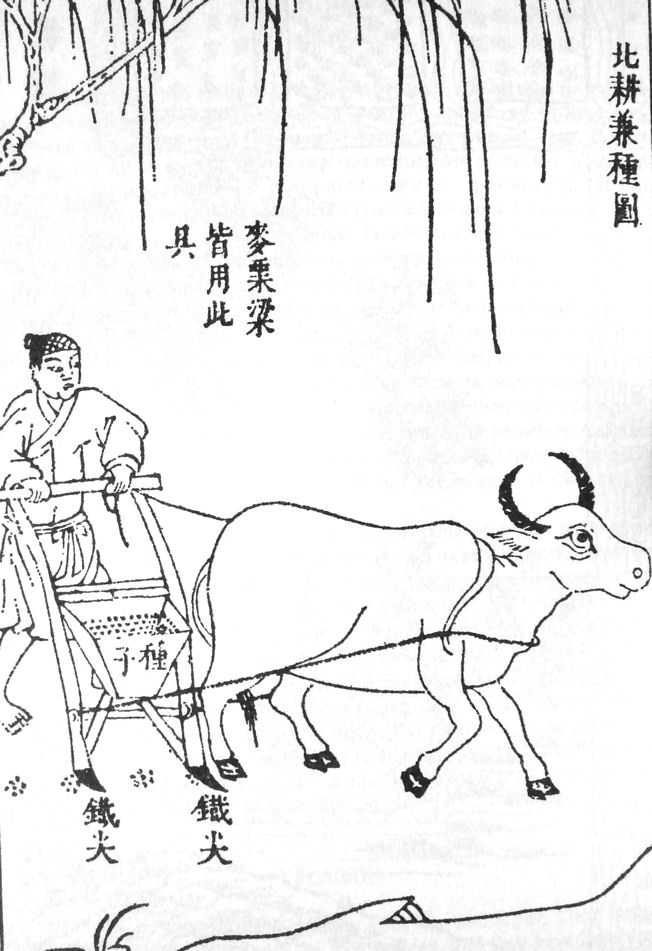
Chinese mobile animal drawn seed drill, published by Song Yingxing in the Tiangong Kaiwu encyclopedia of 1637.

Louche (traditional Chinese: 耬車; simplified Chinese: 耧车; pinyin: lóuche; lit. 'drill sowing vehicle') was a mobile animal-drawn agricultural seed drill invented by the Chinese agronomist Zhao Guo, a Han official in charge of agricultural production during the reign of Han Wudi in the Han dynasty (156 – 29 March 87 BC). According to the records of Political Commentator by the Eastern Han dynasty writer Cui Shi, the Louche consisted of three feet and thus was called three-legged Lou. The three legs had three ditch diggers under it used for sowing. The Louche was animal powered and was pulled by an ox and the leg of the Louche directly dug a ditch in the flattened soil, sowed the seeds, covered the seeds, and pressed the land flat at the same time. The machine was known for its utility and efficiency for serving several agricultural uses at the same time, while saving time and effort.
