= Langweer =

Langweer Langwar
- Village
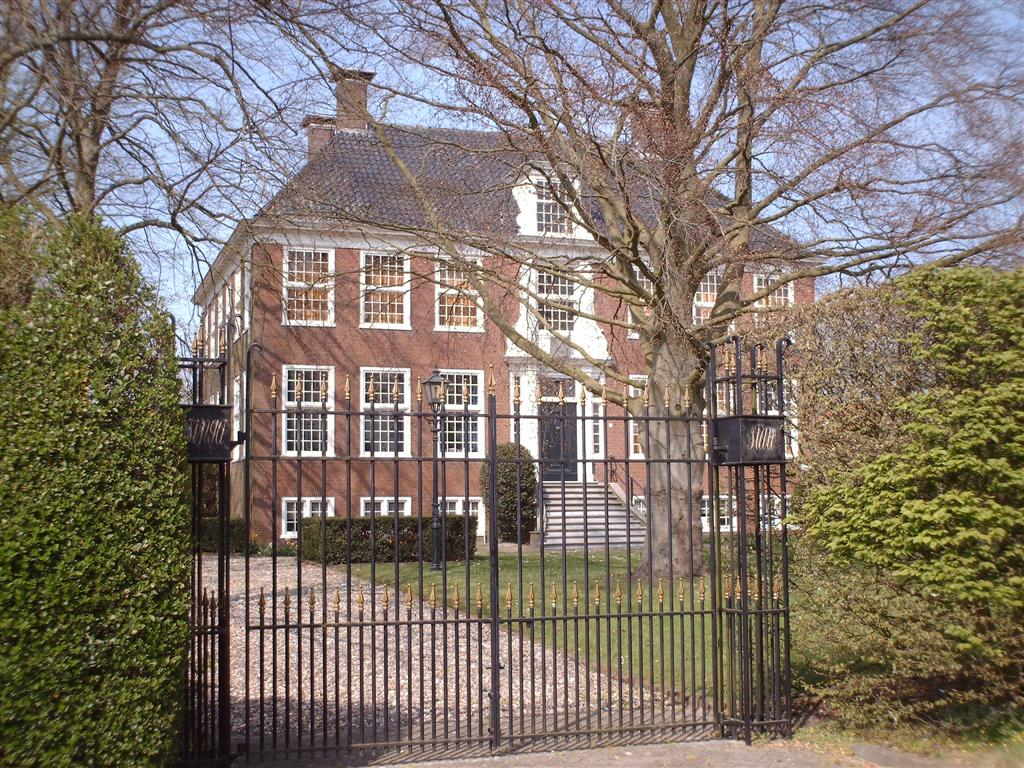
- Osinga State, former Doniawerstal town hall

- Flag Coat of arms

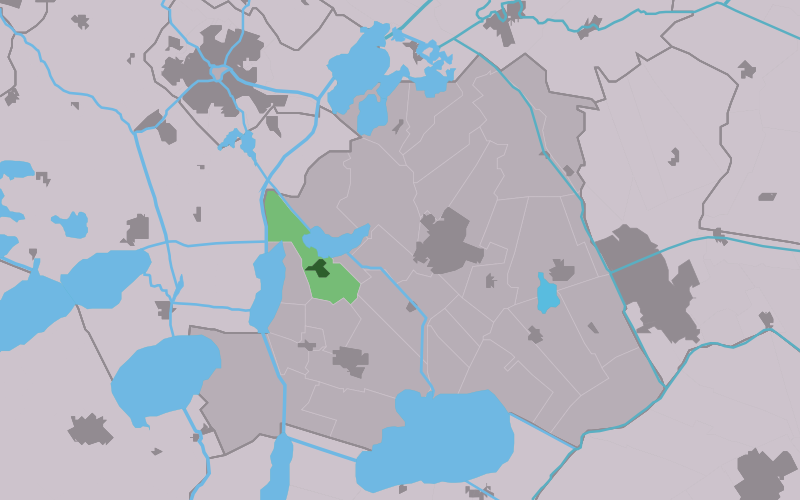
- Location in the former Skarsterlân municipality

- Location in the Netherlands Langweer (Netherlands)
- Country: Netherlands
- Province: Friesland
- Municipality: De Fryske Marren

Population (2017)
  - Total: 1,105
- Time zone: UTC+1 (CET)
  - Summer (DST): UTC+2 (CEST)
- Postal code: 8525
- Telephone area: 0513

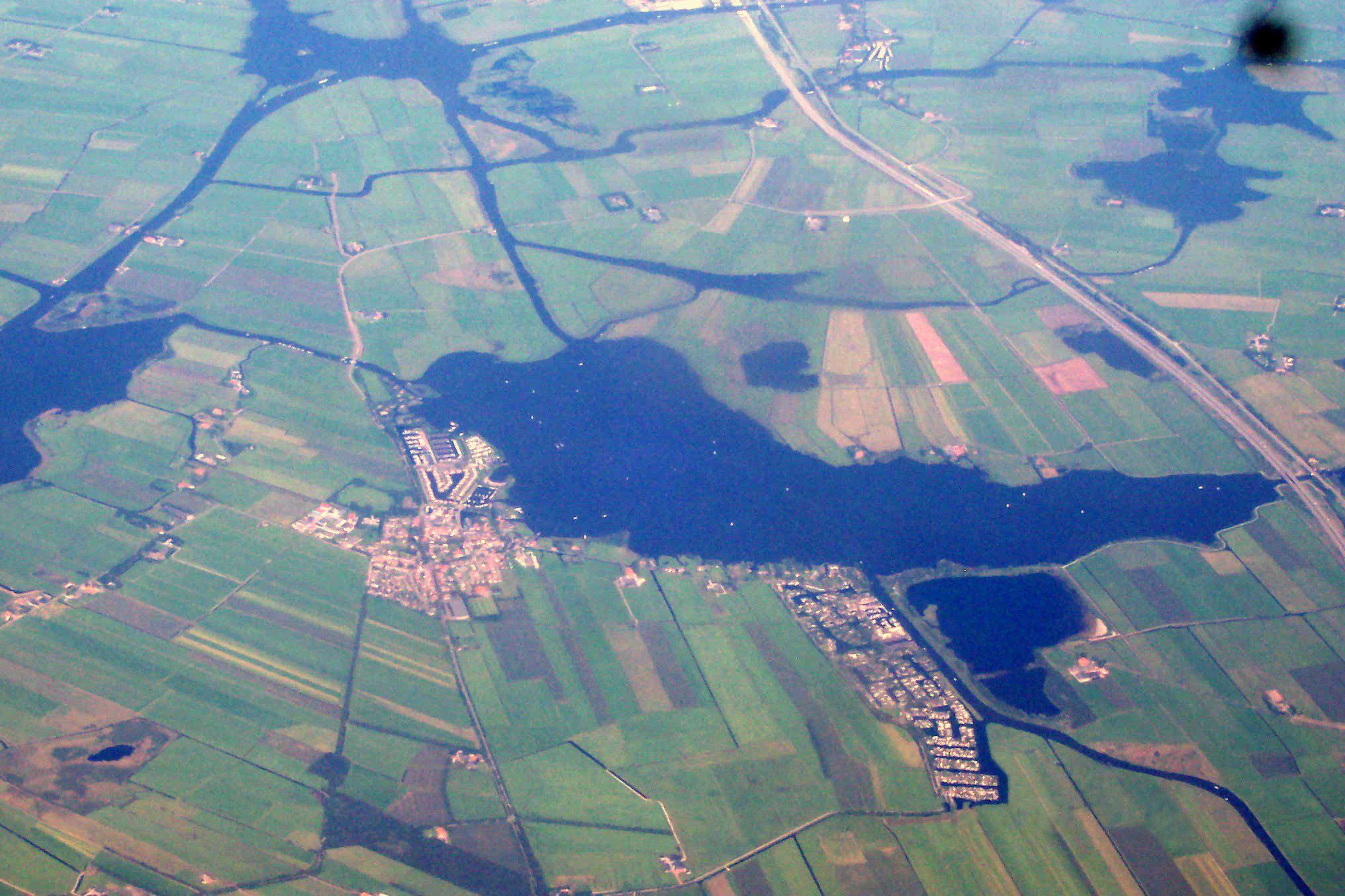

Langweer (West Frisian: Langwar) is a village in Friesland in the municipality De Fryske Marren. The town was established in 1256, and has a population of 1,105 (as of 2017). Langweer has a rich trading history, and it is located at a small lake (Langweerderwielen).

== History ==
Langweer used to only be reached by water. It was backed by swampland. In 1856 it became connected to the outside world by the Brédyk via Sint Nicolaasga. Johan Vegelinsoord of Claerbergen organized this work which involved treeplanting and drainage.

Before 2014, Langweer was part of the Skarsterlân municipality and before 1984 it was the municipal seat of Doniawerstal.

Since the 1990s Langweer has become a favorite town of tourists because of its picturesque streets and watersport opportunities. One of its main events is Skutsjesilen, a sailing race that takes place every summer.

The name Langweer derives from the Frisian name Langwar. War is an old Frisian term for a parcel of land (like English ward) so the name meant long lots, for the shape of the paddocks.

The village symbol which is found on the flag is a swan, possibly derived from the right of farmers to shoot swans.

== Regions ==
The Weversstreek was a street where weavers lived. This is the oldest part of the town. The block between Weversstreek and Stevenshoek used to be full of one room workers cottages.

Between Langweerder Wielen (the lake) and Weversstreek and the Buorren (a street) was a zone called De Greate Gaest. Originally this was a meadow. From 1907 to 1965 the Van Der Leij factory operated, drying grass, and pressing oil. This became the De Greate Gaest cafe, and later a service centre. The buildings were demolished in the 1990s to make way for a waterside housing development.

== Buildings ==
Important buildings include the Hervormde Kerk (Dutch Reformed Church) of Langweer built in 1777 on the site of three earlier churches. This church is unusually decorated compared to others from the 18th century, and has a swan on its spire. Inside is one of the best church organs in Friesland, constructed by Lambertus van Dam in 1784. A five paneled pulpit was preserved from the previous building. This dates from 1684 and made by Benedictus Jans. The earliest church was built around 1200, but deliberately burned down in 1517 by invaders. There was an unsuccessful attempt to rebuild from the remains. A successfully built half sized church appeared in 1663.

The Osinga State was built for Syts van Osinga, grietman of Doniawerstal (Mayor) from 1619 to 1652. It lies to the north of the church. It became the town hall for the municipality. In 1829 the last grietman to live there, Schelte Hessel Roorda of Eysinga locked up the building and left it for thirty years. In 1860 it was found to be untouched with clothes lying on the floor and cups on the table. But was demolished and rebuilt in 1939. Langweer is no longer the municipal capital, so there is no longer a town hall.

The Orangerie was a farm house that featured exotic plants and flowers. It was on the side of the cross town Wymerts canal, which is now filled in.

On the west side of the town was another farmhouse called Douma State. It dates from the sixteenth century. It included another two buildings, the Vechthuis (battle house) and the Douma Stins, which was burned down by Burgundian soldiers in 1517. The farm house was demolished in 1845, but rebuilt in part as an inn called Het Wapen van Friesland. It became a dairy, which was later merged with the milk factory at St. Nicolaasga. The Herberg De Wielen is located here.

De Waag was a weigh house with market that was used up to 1906. Farmers brought cheese and butter to sell. A butter barrel industry and a tannery developed in the town to make money off the farmers. After this it was used as a warehouse and then as a hairdresser.

Regt Huys was a courthouse built around 1600. A judge sat there every Thursday. It was rebuilt in 1766 with original wood used to construct a holding cell in the tower. Later it was used as the town hall for Doniawerstal until 1940. During World War II it was a distribution centre for ration tokens. In the late 2000s the building operated as a library.

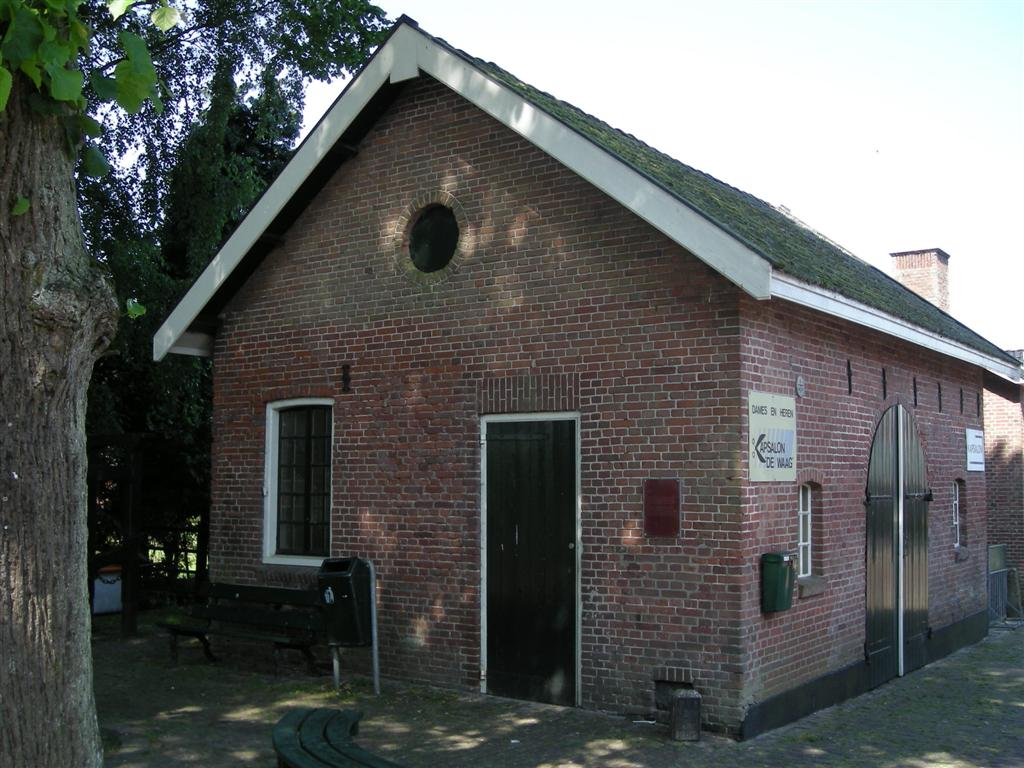
Waag

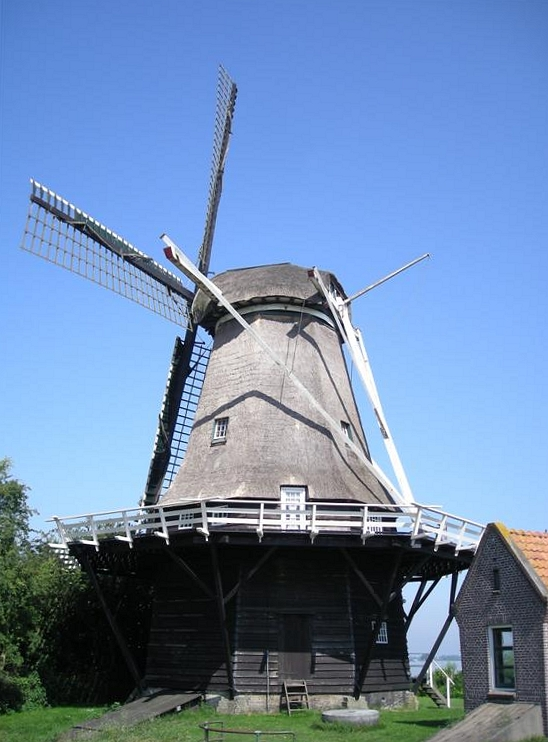
De Sweachmermolen

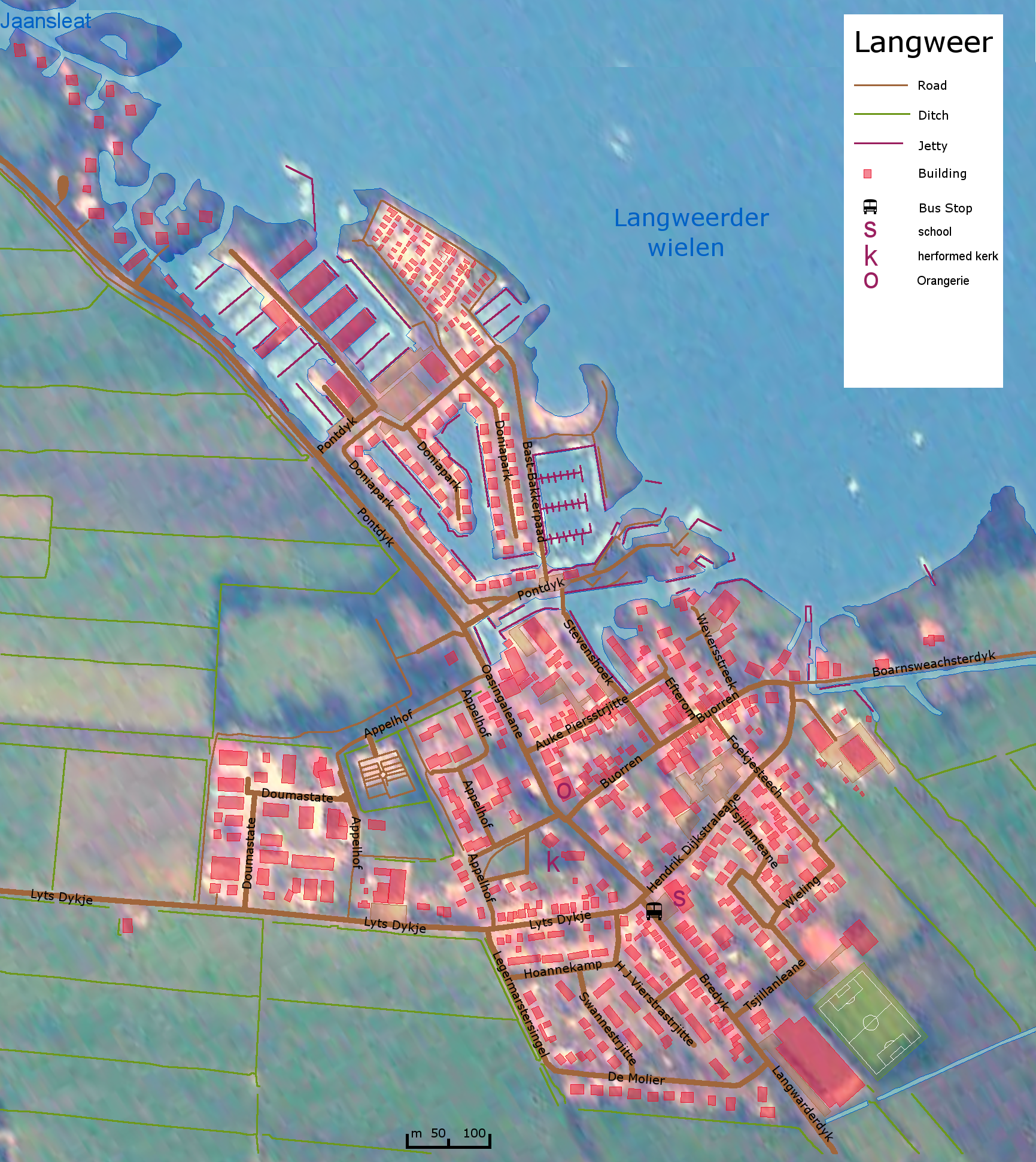
Map

The windmill De Sweachmermolen is a combined corn mill and drainage mill. It has been restored so that it can function as a drainage mill and is held in reserve for use in times of emergency. The mill is also used as a holiday home.

== Amenities ==
The Openbare Basisschool (OBS) t'Swannestee is a public primary school at Bredyk 1.
