= Tiangong Kaiwu plan =

Scientist-proposed Chinese roadmap for Solar System resource utilization to 2100

Tiangong Kaiwu plan (Chinese: 天工开物计划; pinyin: Tiāngōng Kāiwù Jìhuà; lit. "Exploitation of the Works of Nature plan"), also reported as the Solar System resource roadmap, is a concept and long-term roadmap proposed by Chinese space scientists for developing a Solar System-wide space-resources system by around 2100. The vision emphasises in-situ resource utilization (ISRU) of lunar and small-body water ice and strategic minerals, and the use of Lagrange point nodes to build resupply and transport infrastructure. The concept was presented publicly in August 2023 at an academic meeting of the Chinese Society of Astronautics, and was subsequently summarised by China Space News and republished on the CNSA website.

== Background ==
The name draws on the Ming-dynasty encyclopedia Tiangong Kaiwu (The Exploitation of the Works of Nature), signalling a blend of humanistic ethos and engineering practice. Media reports describe the proposal as a scientist-led, long-range concept rather than a formally approved government programme.

== Roadmap proposal ==
Public summaries outline a four-phase, stepwise build-out framed as "prospect–extract–utilise" with milestones around 2035, 2050, 2075 and 2100. The roadmap envisages phased facilities on the lunar south pole, near-Earth asteroids, Mars, main-belt asteroids and the Jovian moons, with logistics nodes at cislunar L1, Sun–Earth L1/L2 and Sun–Mars L1/L2.

- By ~2035 (Exploration/"prospect"): Complete priority resource reconnaissance and on-orbit verifications; begin demonstrators for early resupply nodes.
- By ~2050 (Initial extraction): Demonstrate ISRU of lunar polar water ice and volatile extraction on selected near-Earth asteroids; establish initial resupply stations and transport links.
- By ~2075 (Scaled utilisation): Expand to Mars and main-belt targets; enhance L1/L2 node chains and on-orbit processing; move toward commercial-scale utilisation.
- By ~2100 (System-of-systems): A multi-node resupply and transport network spanning the inner Solar System with capacity for exploration, extraction and integrated utilisation.

== Key technology areas ==
The proposal highlights common enabling technologies across "space access, transportation, resupply, mining, and processing," including low-cost resource return, airline-like transport cadence, resupply stations, and extraterrestrial mining/processing outposts. Science communication pieces and later coverage have discussed related directions such as polar ice prospecting (e.g., Chang'e 7), autonomous extraction, and ISRU for propellants and construction.

== Media coverage and interpretation ==
English- and Chinese-language outlets covered the unveiling as a 2100-oriented space-resources roadmap proposed by scientists, often using Tiangong Kaiwu or "Solar System resource roadmap." Reports typically characterise it as a preliminary concept rather than a government-funded programme.

== See also ==
- Cislunar space
- Artemis program
- In-situ resource utilization
- Space mining
- Lagrange point
