= Boornzwaag =

Boornzwaag Boarnsweach
- Village
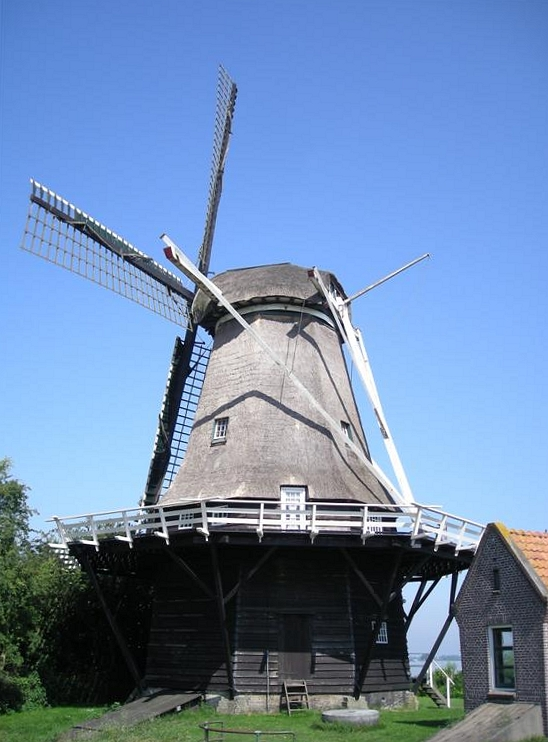
- Sweachmermolen at Boornzwaag

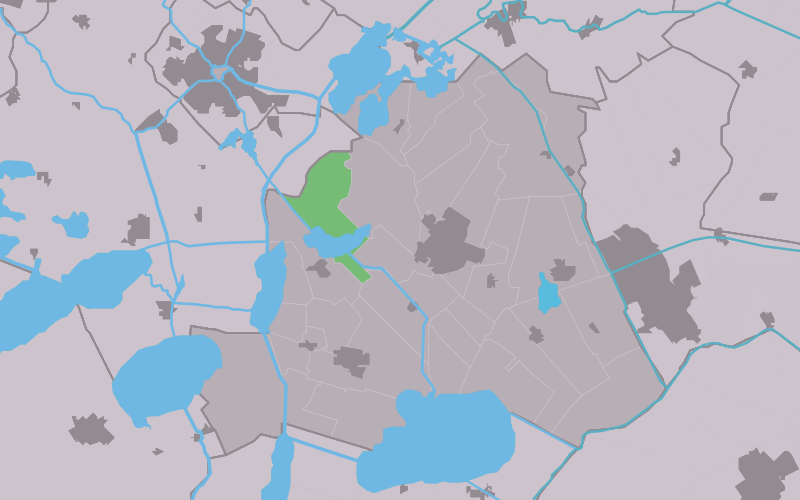
- Location in the former Skarsterlân municipality

- Location in the Netherlands
- Country: Netherlands
- Province: Friesland
- Municipality: De Fryske Marren

Population (2017)
  - Total: 105
- Time zone: UTC+1 (CET)
  - Summer (DST): UTC+2 (CEST)

Boornzwaag (West Frisian: Boarnsweach) is a small village in De Fryske Marren in the province Friesland of the Netherlands and has around 105 citizens (2017). It is located east of Langweer on the south east shore of the lake called Langweerder Wielen. The name is derived from two words, boarn meaning water and sweach meaning pasture.

A canal called Scharsterrijn lies to the north east of the village. A small ferry takes pedestrians and cyclists across the Scharsterrijn. There is a marina. To the south is a canal estate called De Woudfennen bungalowpark. At the furthest south end is the Scharsterrijn caravanpark, which is mostly full of cabins.

== History ==
Over the centuries the Langweerder Wielen has gradually eroded the village. In 1693 the church was demolished, and was followed by the bell tower. Before 2009, Boornzwaag was part of the Skarsterlân municipality and before 1984 it was part of Doniawerstal.

== Windmill ==
The Sweachmermolen was built in 1782. It is located on the west side of Boornzwaag approaching Langmeer. The original owner was the grietman Frans Julius Johan van Eijsinga. It is a Achtkante bovenkruier which means it has an eight sided rotating top on a fixed base. Its function was as a cornmill and water pump. Its polder function was replaced by an electric pump in 1925. After this it was disused. In 1949 a group called "Stichting tot instandhouding van de Langweerder molen" (Foundation for the Conservation of Langweerder mill) was formed.

== Population growth ==
- 1954 - 130
- 1959 - 135
- 1964 - 104
- 1969 - 100
- 1974 - 101
- 2004 - 190

== Streets ==
Aldewei, Boarnsweachsterdyk, Horsewei, Houtfeartwei, Mûzekamp, Pontdyk, Rodenburgwei, Skarsterleane, Wielenleane.
