= Tiangong Kaiwu =

1637 Chinese encyclopedia compiled by Song Yingxing

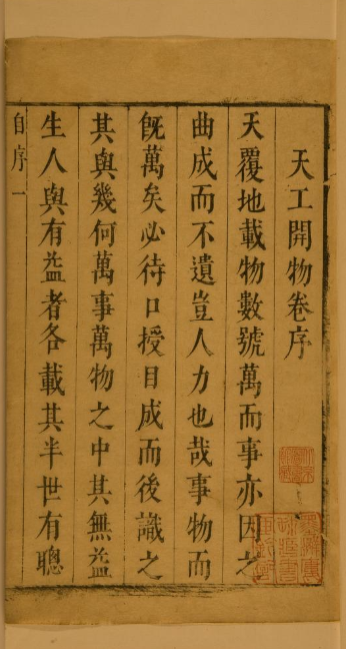
- First page of the original Chinese edition
- Author: Song Yingxing
- Language: Chinese
- Publication date: May 1637

The Tiangong Kaiwu (天工開物), or The Exploitation of the Works of Nature was a Chinese encyclopedia compiled by Song Yingxing. It was published in May 1637 with funding provided by Song's patron Tu Shaokui. The Tiangong Kaiwu is an encyclopedia covering a wide range of technical issues, including the use of various gunpowder weapons. Copies of the book were very scarce in China during the Qing dynasty (1644–1911) (due to the government's establishment of monopolies over certain industries described in the book), but original copies of the book were preserved in Japan.

== Overview ==
It featured detailed illustrations that were valuable for historians in understanding many early Chinese production processes. For example, illustrations for brick-making; one shows a kilnmaster checking the temperature of a furnace while an assistant stands by and douses the kiln to induce superficial glazing; another illustration shows a brick-maker filling a wooden mold with clay while he dresses the brick's surface with a finishing wire strung on a bow.

As historian Joseph Needham has observed, the vast amount of accurately drawn illustrations in this encyclopedia dwarfed the amount provided in previous Chinese encyclopedias, making it a valuable written work in the history of Chinese literature. At the same time, the Tiangong Kaiwu broke from Chinese tradition by rarely referencing previous written work. It is instead written in a style strongly suggestive of first-hand experience. In the preface to the work, Song attributed this deviation from tradition to his poverty and low standing.

It was translated into English by E-tu Zen Sun and Shiou-chuan Sun.

== Agriculture ==
In the first chapter, The Growing of Grains, Song Yingxing wrote about the great necessity of rural farmers in society, and although they were emulated by tradition, were scoffed at by aristocrats throughout time. Song Yingxing began the chapter with the context of this paragraph in mind:

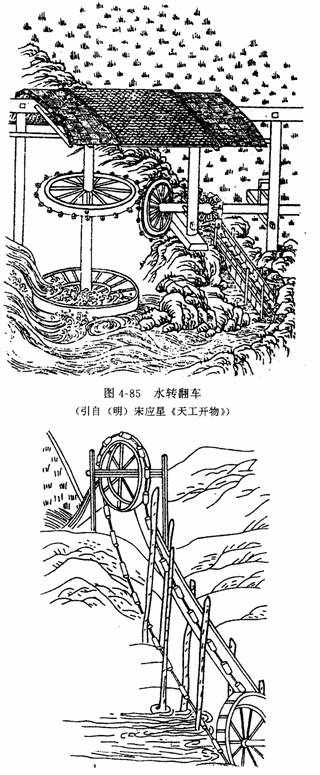
Two types of hydraulic-powered chain pumps from the Tiangong Kaiwu.

Master Song observes that, while the existence of the Divine Agriculturalist of antiquity is an uncertain matter, the truth denoted by the two words of his name has existed down to the present day. Man cannot live long without the sustenance of the five grains; yet the five grains cannot grow of themselves; they must depend on man to cultivate them. The nature of the soil changes with time, and the species and properties [of the plants] differ according to the geographic environment. But why was it that the classification and explanation of the numerous varieties of grain had to await the coming of Houzhi, even though a thousand years had elapsed between the time of the Divine Agriculturalist and the Emperor Taotang, during which interval grain was used as food and the benefits of cultivation had been taught throughout the country? It was because the rich men regarded the [farmer's] straw hat and cape as convicts garb, and in aristocratic households the word "peasant" had come to be used as a curse. Many a man would know the taste of his breakfast and supper, but was ignorant of their sources. That the First Agriculturalist should have been called "Divine" is certainly not the mere outcome of human contrivances.

Song wrote about the general terms used in agriculture, saying that the "hundred grains" referred to crops in general, while the "five grains" were specifically sesamum, legumes, wheat, panicled millet, and glutinous millet (rice was not included in this, says Song, because the ancients were only used to the environment of northern China, which was devoid of rice at the time). He wrote about the meticulous and proper cultivation of each crop, as well as how to avoid agricultural disasters in the process.

In aiding the text, he also provided many different drawn illustrations, including a man loosening the soil by ploughing with an ox, soil broken into fine particles by an ox-drawn harrow, men engaging in foot weeding and hand weeding of rice, a vertical waterwheel with hollow wooden cylinders dipping water into an open woodwork tub feeding an irrigation canal, a cylinder-type chain pump powered by a vertical waterwheel placed in a narrow, low-lying stream with a mounted rotating wheel placed at the top of an elevated plane, whereupon the cylinders fed water into an irrigation canal, a wooden river dam correcting the flow of water around a field of crops, a sluice gate controlling the flow of a water channel, a square-pallet chain pump powered by a horizontal waterwheel, connected by an axle to a gear-tooth wheel above, which in turn engaged a vertical gear-tooth wheel, another square-pallet chain pump employing an ox-drawn set of geared wheels, two different types of foot-treadle operated chain pumps, a counterweighted lever for raising or lowering a bucket, a pulley-wheel for raising or lowering a bucket, an ox-drawn plough-seeder with a cone-shaped filter, an ox-drawn pair of stone rollers, used for pressing seeds into the soil, the simpler process of sewing seeds by hand and pressing them into the dirt by foot, and finally, an illustration of men cultivating wheat with broad-headed hoes.

In another chapter, The Preparation of Grains, he also provided illustrations for rolling rice grains with a wooden ox-drawn roller, a crank-operated rotary-fan winnowing machine that separated husks, a hand-operated wooden hulling mill, a hand-operated earthen hulling machine, a process of sieving to separate husk-free grains, two types of foot-operated trip hammers, a hydraulic-powered trip hammer powered by a waterwheel that rotated an axle of overhead cams, a horse-drawn hulling mill, an oxen-drawn grinding mill, a grinding mill operated by a vertical waterwheel, and a rolling mill operated by a horizontal waterwheel, the waterwheel placed in a rushing current found under a wooden deck that rotated the axle of the stone roller above within the interior of a building.

== Nautics ==
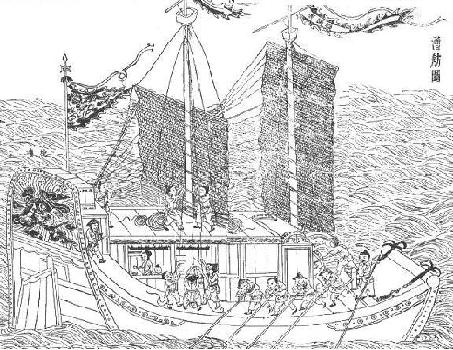
A two-masted Chinese junk ship, from the Tiangong Kaiwu.

The subject of maritime and nautical technology and engineering was discussed extensively by Song Yingxing. Song noted that in northern China the chief means of transportation was by carriage and cart, while in southern China it was by ship and boat. He provided various nuances about nautical matters, such as metal anchors for battleships and seagoing vessels weighing up to 30,000 catties. Song noted that there were thousands of names classifying different boats found in China, which was often named in accordance to their overall shape, cargo capacity, and quality (of material used and construction). For example, he described the layout and construction of the grain tribute boat as a shallow, flat-bottom craft, with the preferred woods of cedar and chestnut being used to construct the bulkhead compartments of the hull. Song also wrote of the methods used by the Chinese in his day for pearl diving in Guangdong. Song wrote that these divers were able to stay underwater for prolonged periods of time since a secure rope was tied around their waists connected to the ship as they breathed through a long curving pipe that led up above the surface of the water. This long breathing tube was strengthened by rings of tin and fastened to a watertight leather face mask. A drawn illustration of this was provided in his book.

In his admiration for the stern-mounted steering rudder (which had been known to the Chinese since at least the 1st century AD), he wrote:

The nature of a ship is to follow water as the grass bends under the wind. Therefore a rudder is constructed to divide and make a barrier to the water, so that it will not itself determine the direction of the vessel's motion. As the rudder is turned, the water turbulently presses on it, and the boat reacts to it. The dimensions of the rudder should be such that its base is level with the bottom of the (inland transport) ship. If it is deeper, even by an inch, a shallow may allow the hull to pass but the stern with its rudder may stick firmly in the mud (thus grounding the vessel); then if the wind is at gale strength that inch of wood will give rise to indescribable difficulties. If the rudder is shorter, even by an inch, it will not have enough turning forces to bring the bows round. The water divided and obstructed by the rudder's strength, is echoed as far as the bows; it is as if there were underneath the hull a swift current carrying the vessel in the very direction desired. So nothing needs to be done at the bows...The rudder is worked by a tiller attached to the top of its post, a 'door-bar' (as the sailors call it). To turn the boat to the north the tiller is thrust to the south, and vice versa...The rudder is made of a straight post of wood [more than 10 ft. long and 3 ft. in circumference for the grain-ships] with the tiller at the top, and an axe-shaped blade of boards fitted into a groove cut at its lower end. This blade is firmly fastened to the post with iron nails, and the whole is fixed (with tackle) to the ship to perform its function. At the end of the stern there is a raised part (for the helmsman) which is also called the 'rudder-house'.

(Note: in this passage he speaks mostly of fresh-water ships at Poyang Lake and the Grand Canal.)

== Sericulture and cotton ==
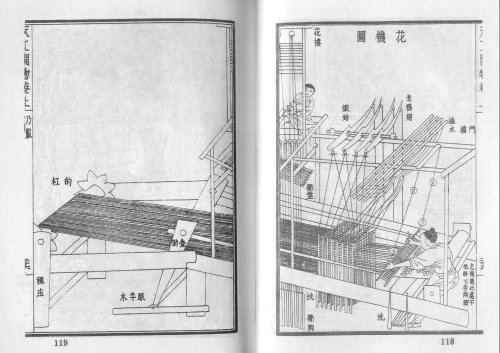
A giant draw loom machine for figure weaving, from the Tiangong Kaiwu.

Song Yingxing opened his chapter on clothing with the aspects of sericulture in producing silk. He gave an accurate description of the raising of silkworms, along with their instinctual mating tradition. Those raising the silkworms had their eggs deposited on sheets of paper or cloth, and stored for use in the following year. He wrote that in some regions a bathing process was used on these sheets, employing rain water, lime water, or brine, and gave specifications on the timing for this during winter, in the 12th month of the year. The reason for this, he said, was so that the inferior eggs would die in the process, hence less mulberry leaves would be consumed needlessly. He also provided specifications on how to avoid damaging the eggs in the long process of preparation before the bathing process in the 12th month. He noted the differences between two general forms of silkworms, late and early, while providing information on a wide variety in different silkworm breeds and cocoons, and even silkworm diseases. After their eventful hatching, he described the proper living conditions and environment that the silkworms should be immersed in, as well as the care that should be given in feeding them. He warned of different sources of foul odors and smoke that had the capability of killing the silkworms if they came into contact. He described the spinning of cocoons, gathering of cocoons, sorting of cocoons, and the different pests such as birds and mosquitoes that should be avoided, He also described the proper planting of mulberry trees and how to harvest them. For the process of making silk, he noted that raw silk could not be reeled into normal silk until a formal wadding process was done. He described the reeling of silk fabric with a reeling machine, the spooling of silk fibers, the spinning of silk fibers into weft yarns, the silken threads drawn into a warp frame for weaving, and the "ingenious" works of figure designing. He also described the proper dimensions of different draw looms,

Song Yingxing wrote that although silk was reserved for those with economic means, both rich and poor used cotton clothing during the winter. In ancient times, he said, cotton was called xima ('nettle-hemp'). He outlined two different types of cotton and their characteristics: tree cotton (Ceiba pentandra) and the cotton plant (Gossypium indicum). He noted their planting in spring and their picking by autumn, as well as use of a cotton gin to separate cotton seeds that are naturally tightly fastened to fiber bolls of cotton. He noted the process of straightening the cotton fibers with wooden boards, which prepared them for the spinning wheel, the "slivers drawn out to desired size and twisted into yarns." After describing the weaving process of cotton and the different patterns used, he also described cotton padding during winter, in ancient times it was hemp padding, and that the rich could afford silk padding in their winter attire. In addition to these he also described different fur, woolen, and felt clothing.

== Metallurgy, casting, and forging ==
Smelting silver ore and the process of removing lead compounds, from the Tiangong Kaiwu.

In China, the 'five metals' were gold, silver, copper, iron, and tin, although the term could be extended in general terms to any sort of metal. He wrote of how gold was held to be the most precious metal of them all, and that it could be obtained in the mountains, panned from river sand, and from underground mining. He also outlined the different grades of gold and its malleable qualities. To eliminate trace elements of other metals found in gold alloys, Song Yingxing outlined the use of a crucible technique.

Song Yingxing wrote that ancient rulers of early China cast inscriptions of writing onto bronze tripods since this was a much more durable method of preserving the written record than using the perishable materials found in books and scrolls. He noted that musical and announcing bells of higher quality were made of different copper alloys, while those of lesser quality were made of iron. He also provided weighted formulas of different metal compositions for certain bells, for example, the casting a large bell in an audience hall or pavilion that required 47,000 catties of copper, 4,000 catties of tin, 50 oz. of gold, and 120 oz. of silver in its composition. In the smelting process, long pits for the liquid metal flow had to be dug, having a drymold construction of lime and mortar that was dried and covered in ox fat and beeswax. Then he noted the following process of pounded earth and charcoal powder that was screened and mixed into a mud paste that would be gradually spread on the surface of the wax several inches thick. When dried and heated so that the melted fat and wax could flow out entirely by means of apertures at the base, the bell or tripod could be cast in the vacated cavity between the core and the mold. With the individual casting process for bells and tripods, Song Yingxing also described the intricate individual casting processes for making cooking pots and pans, metal statues, metal barrels of cannons, metallic mirrors, and different metallic coins of copper or iron. He described the processes of hammer forging with the initial casting of an anvil, and noted that in the heating process of forging, coal accounted for 70% of the fuel, charcoal taking the rest at 30%. He also outlined the quench-hardening process of rapid cooling in clear water immediately after iron and steel products were forged. He outlined the different types of knives, axes, hoes, file tools, awls, saws, wood chisels, anchors, and metal needles that could be forged and produced. For the making of the finest swords, he said, they are coated with steel after "a hundred smeltings," but the core of the sword was still made of wrought iron; this was because a sword made entirely of steel would easily break when making hard strikes.

== Sulfur and saltpetre ==
There were many manufacturing processes described in the Tiangong Kaiwu. For example, for roasting iron pyrite in converting sulphide to oxide in sulfur used in gunpowder compositions, the book illustrated how ore was piled up with coal briquettes in an earthen furnace with a still-head that sent over sulfur as vapor that would solidify and crystallize. For the preparation of saltpetre, Song Yingxing wrote:

Saltpetre (solve-stone) is found both in China and in the lands of neighboring peoples, all have it. In China it is chiefly produced in the north and west. Merchants who sell (saltpetre) in the southern and eastern (parts of the country) without first paying for the official certificate are punished for illegal trading. Natural saltpetre has the same origin as common salt. Subterranean moisture streams up to the surface, and then in places near water (e.g. the sea), and where the earth is thin, it forms common salt, while in places near the mountains, and where the earth is thick, it forms saltpetre. Because it dissolves immediately in water it is called solve-stone. In places north of the Yangtze and the Huai rivers, after the mid-Autumn fortnightly period, (people) just have to be at home and sweep the earthen floors on alternate days to collect a little for purifying. Saltpetre is most abundant in three places. That produced in Sichuan is called chuan xiao; that which comes from Shanxi is commonly called yan xiao; and that found in Shandong is commonly called tu xiao.

After collecting saltpetre by scraping or sweeping the ground (as also from walls) it is immersed in a tub of water for a night, and impurities floating on the surface are skimmed off. The solution is then put into a pan. After boiling until the solution is sufficiently concentrated, it is transferred to a container, and overnight the saltpetre crystallizes out. The prickly crystals floating on the surface are called meng xiao and the longer crystals are maya xiao (the amount of these varies with the places where the raw material has been collected). The coarse (powder or crystals) left at the bottom as a residue is called pu xiao.

For purification the remaining solution is again boiled, together with a few pieces of turnip, until the water has evaporated further. This is then poured into a basin and left overnight so that a mess of snow-white (crystals) is formed, and that is called pen xiao. For making gunpowder this ya xiao and pen xiao have a similar effect. When saltpetre is used for making gunpowder, if in small quantity it has to be dried on new tiles, and if in large quantity it should be dried in earthenware vessels. As soon as any moisture has all gone, the saltpetre is ground to a powder, but one should never use an iron pestle in a stone mortar, because any spark accidentally produced could cause an irretrievable catastrophe. One should measure out the amount of saltpetre to be used in a particular gunpowder formula, and then grind it together with (the right amount of) sulfur. Charcoal is only added later. After saltpetre has been dried, it may become moist again if left over a period of time. Hence when used in large cannons it is usually carried separately, and the gunpowder prepared and mixed on the spot.

== Gunpowder weapons ==
Many of the gunpowder weapons that Song Yingxing described were similar to those in the Chinese Huolongjing of the earlier 14th century, although there are many noted differences between the two. For example, the Huolongjing described a land mine that was triggered by motion of the enemy above, with a pin release that let down falling weights which would use rope and axle to rotate a flint steel-wheel which in turn sent sparks onto a train of fuses for the mines. It also described an explosive naval mine that was timed by a fuse and sent down river to an enemy ship. However, it was the Tiangong Kaiwu of Song Yingxing that outlined the use of a rip-cord pulled from ambushers hidden on a nearby shore that would trigger the steel-wheel mechanism in producing sparks for the naval mine placed in the river or lake. Song Yingxing also outlined the different types of metals that were preferable in casting different types of handguns and cannons.

Song Yingxing described a 'match for ten thousand armies' bomb as follows:

(When attacks are made upon) the walls of small cities in remote prefectures; if the available guns are too weak to repulse the enemy, then bombs should be suspended (i.e. dropped) from the battlements; if the situation continues to worsen, then the 'match for ten thousand armies' bomb should be employed...The saltpetre and sulfur in the bomb, on being ignited (explode), and blow many men and horses to pieces in an instant. The method is to use a dried empty clay ball with a small hole for filling, and in it are put the gunpowder, including sulfur and saltpetre, together with 'poison gunpowder' and 'magic gunpowder'. The relative proportion of the three gunpowders can be varied at will. After the fuse has been fitted, the bomb is enclosed in a wooden frame. Alternatively a wooden tub, coated on the inside with the sort of clay used for image-making, can be used. It is absolutely necessary to use the wooden framework or the tub in order to prevent any premature breakage as the missile falls (until the gunpowder explodes). When a city is under attack by an enemy the defenders on the walls light the fuse and throw the bomb down. The force of the explosion spins the bomb round in all directions, but the city walls protect one's own men from its effects on that side, while the enemy's men and horses are not so fortunate. This is the best of weapons for the defense of cities.

The historian Needham notes that Song Yingxing must not have been much of a military man with extensive knowledge of martial matters, due to his enthusiasm for this archaic type of bomb that had been used by the Chinese since the Song dynasty in the 12th century.

== Gallery ==
A farmer operating a pulley wheel to lift a bucket

Raising brine from the bottom of a salt well

Crushing cane with an ox-powered vertical-toothed roll crusher for extracting cane juice

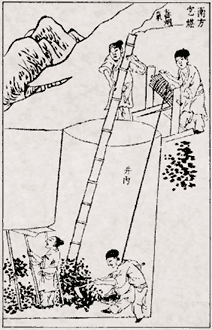
Chinese coal mining

An oxen-driven grinding mill

Foot-treadle operated and ox-driven irrigation chain pumps

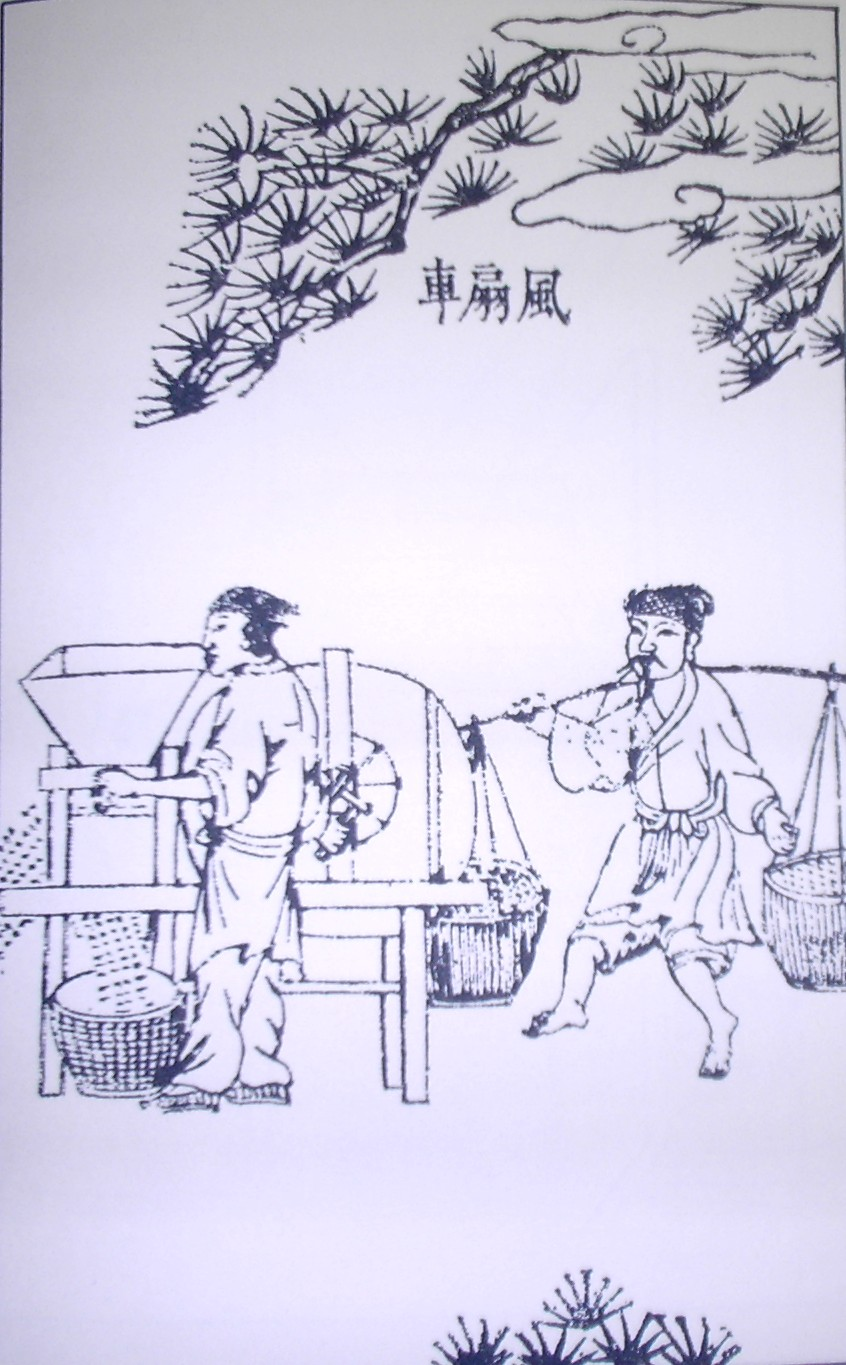
Rotary fan winnowing machine separating husks from the grain

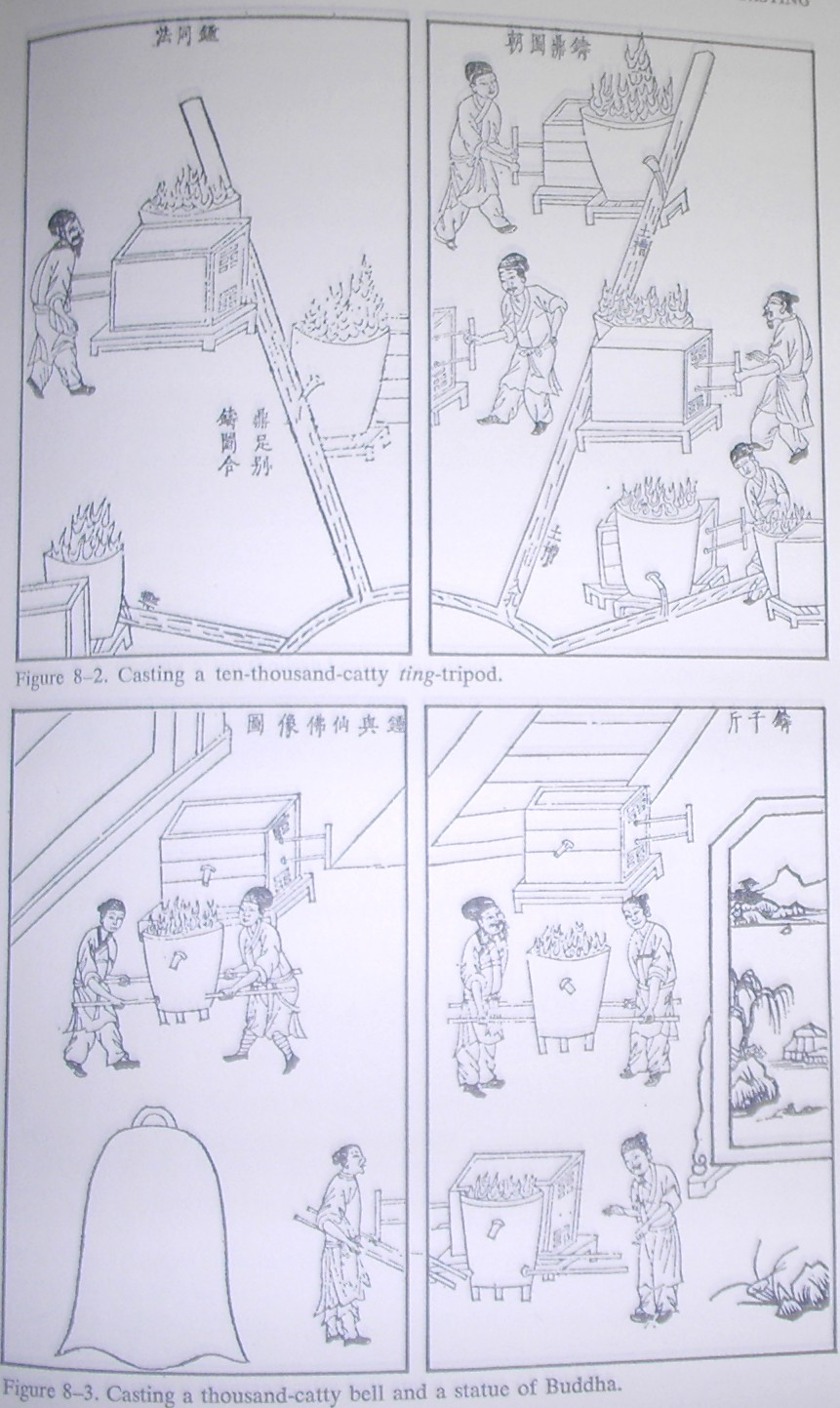
Casting a tripod, bell, and statue

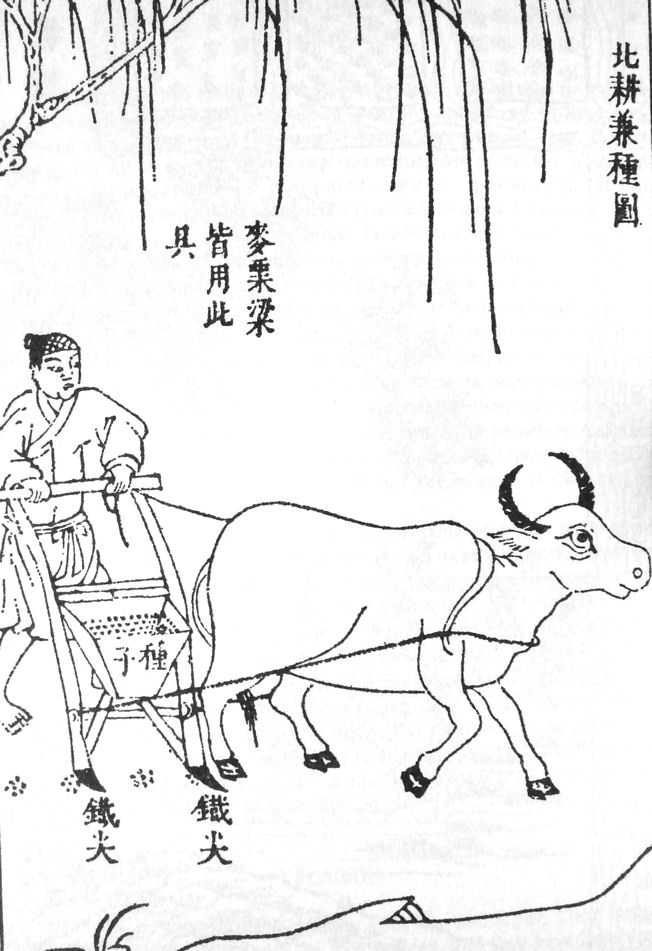
Agricultural seed drill pulled by an ox

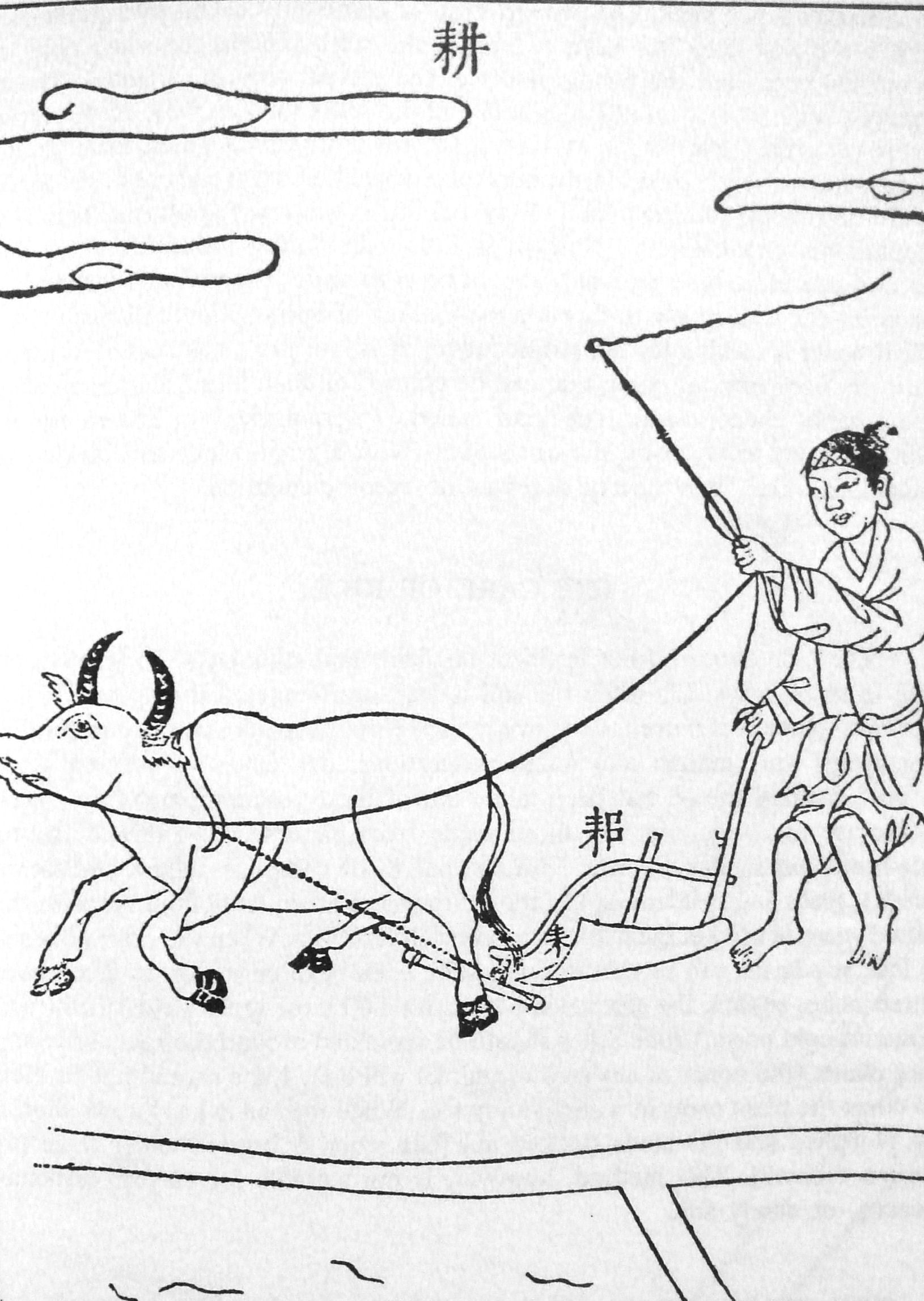
Iron plow

== See also ==
- Tiangong Kaiwu plan
