= Rotor solidity =

Rotor solidity is a dimensionless quantity used in design and analysis of rotorcraft, propellers and wind turbines. Rotor solidity is a function of the aspect ratio and number of blades in the rotor and is widely used as a parameter for ensuring geometric similarity in rotorcraft experiments. It provides a measure of how close a lifting rotor system is to an ideal actuator disk in momentum theory. It also plays an important role in determining the fluid speed across the rotor disk when lift is generated and consequentially the performance of the rotor; amount of downwash around it, and noise levels the rotor generates. It is also used to compare performance characteristics between rotors of different sizes. Typical values of rotor solidity ratio for helicopters fall in the range 0.05 to 0.12.

== Definitions ==
Rotor solidity is the ratio of area of the rotor blades to the area of the rotor disk.

For a rotor with $N$ blades, each of radius $R$ and average chord $c$, rotor solidity $\sigma$ is:

$\sigma \equiv \frac{A_b}{A_d} = \frac{NcR}{\pi R^2} = \frac{Nc}{\pi R}$

where $A_b$ is the blade area and $A_d$ is the disk area.

For blades with a non-rectangular planform, solidity is often computed using an equivalent weighted form as

$\sigma_e\equiv \frac{1}{R}\int_0^R w(r)\ \sigma(r)dr$

where:

- $w$ is a weighting function corresponding to the blade section
- $\sigma$ is solidity corresponding to the blade section
- $r$ is radial length to the blade section

The weighing function is determined by the aerodynamic performance parameter that is assumed to be constant in comparison to an equivalent rotor having a rectangular blade planform. For example, when rotor thrust coefficient is assumed to be constant, the weighing function comes out to be:

$w(r) = 3 r^2$

and the corresponding weighted solidity ratio is known as the thrust-weighted solidity ratio. In dimensional form, this is:

$\sigma_T = \frac{3N}{\pi\, r^4} \int_0^R r^2 c(r) \, dr$

When rotor power or torque coefficient is assumed constant, the weighing function is:

$w(r) = 4 r^3$

and the corresponding weighted solidity ratio is known as the power or torque-weighted solidity ratio. This solidity ratio is analogous to the activity factor used in propeller design and is also used in wind turbine analysis. However, it is rarely used in helicopter design.

== Geometric significance ==
Two rotors illustrating the geometric significance of rotor solidity ratio. The rotor on the right has a larger solidity ratio due to the blades covering a larger fraction of the net rotor disk area.

A crude idea of what a rotor or propeller geometry looks like can be obtained from the rotor solidity ratio. Rotors with stubbier and/or a larger number of blades have a larger solidity ratio since they cover a larger fraction of the rotor disk. Rotorcraft like helicopters typically use blades with very low solidity ratios compared to fixed-wing and marine propellers.
