= Waterladder pump =

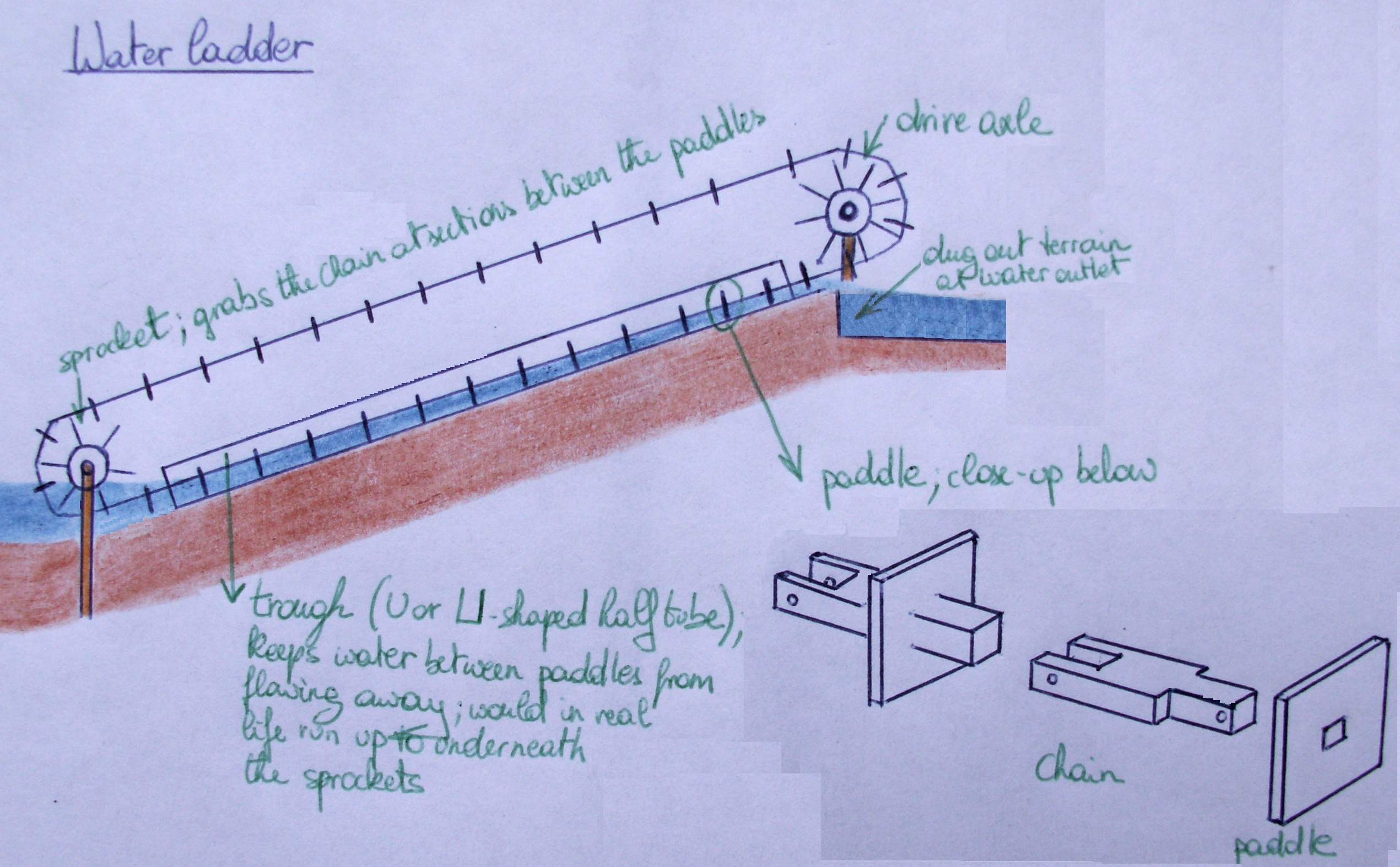
An illustration of a waterladder pump

A waterladder pump, water ladder, dragon spine, dragon wheel or rahad is a low lift pump which is composed of sprockets that move a chain with paddles over a trough. Water is pumped as the paddles push the water up the trough.

== Application ==
The water ladder, as many low lift pumps, is commonly used for irrigation purposes and for drainage of lands. It is currently still used by farmers in south-east Asia.

== Advantages ==
The water ladder was built as an alternative to the paddle wheel to get around the problem that to lift water to a greater height, a bigger wheel is needed. Despite the emergence of new pumps that operate on other principles, the water ladder remains an important tool as some of its other benefits are that they can be built and repaired easily at a very low cost. This is possible as all the components can be built from local resources, such as wood; which can be obtained and shaped into the desired form easily.

== Disadvantages ==
As mentioned before, the pump only allows the lifting of water over a small height. This makes it unsuitable to water drainage or irrigation over larger height differences or many other pumping applications besides drainage and irrigation.

== See also ==
- Rope pump
- Chain pump
