= Chain pump =

Type of water pump

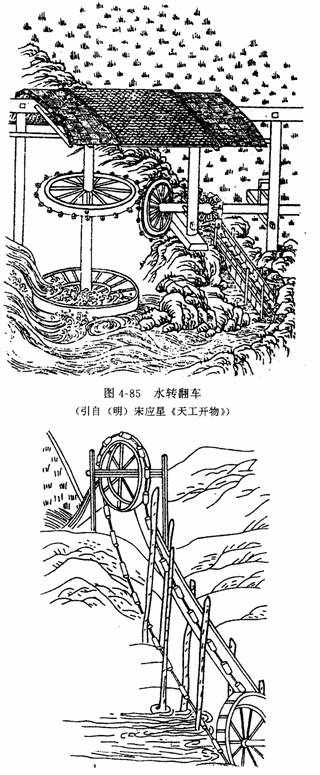
Two types of hydraulic-powered chain pump from the Chinese encyclopedia Tiangong Kaiwu (1637), written by Song Yingxing

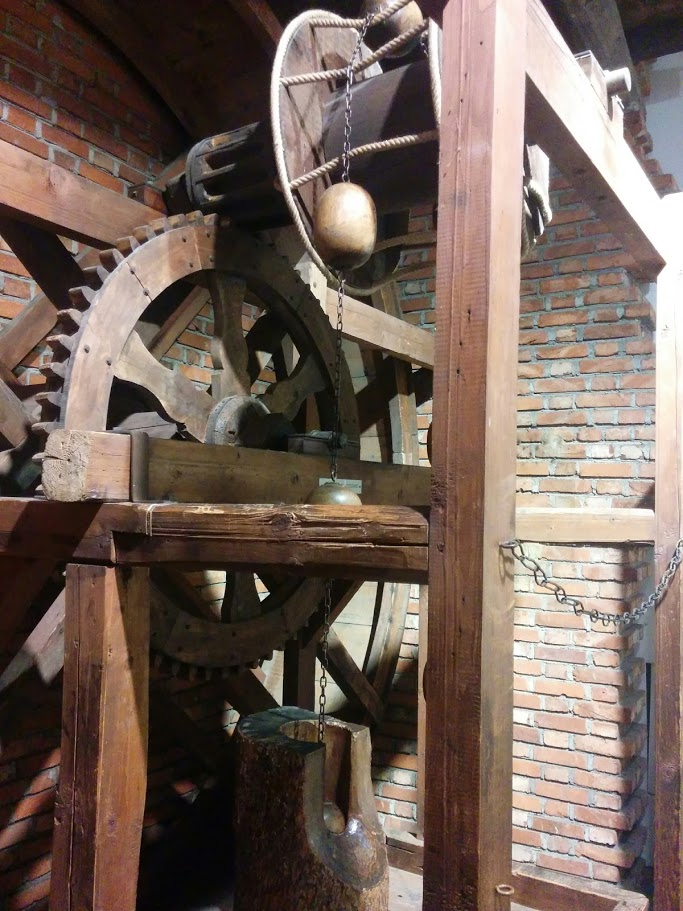
Rope pump in Milan Science Museum

The chain pump is type of a water pump in which several circular discs are positioned on an endless chain. One part of the chain dips into the water, and the chain runs through a tube, slightly bigger than the diameter of the discs. As the chain is drawn up the tube, water becomes trapped between the discs and is lifted to and discharged at the top. Chain pumps were used for centuries in the ancient Middle East, Europe, and China.

A rope pump is similar, with round disks attached to the rope, or knots, matching the diameter of the pipe allow water to be pulled to the surface. The rope pump is commonly used in developing countries for both community water supply and self-supply. It can be installed on boreholes or hand-dug wells, providing an affordable and efficient water-lifting solution.

== History ==
=== Near East and Europe ===
The earliest evidence for this device is in a Babylonian text from about 700 B.C. They were commonly powered by humans or animals. The device then appeared in ancient Egypt from about 200 B.C., featuring a pair of gear-wheels.

A version of the chain pump was used in ancient Greece and Rome, sometimes with pots, or scoops fixed to the chain, which, as they passed over the top pulley, tipped the water out; a 2nd-century example is preserved in London. Philo of Byzantium wrote of such a device in the 2nd century B.C.; the historian Vitruvius mentioned them around 30 B.C. Fragments of the cogs, crank, and discs, of a bilge pump, from a 1st-century Roman barge, were unearthed at Lake Nemi.

Chain pumps were used in European mines during the Renaissance; mineralogist Georg Agricola illustrated them in his De re metallica (1556). Chain pumps were commonly used on naval vessels of the time to pump the bilges, and examples are known in the nineteenth century for low-lift irrigation.

=== China ===
Chain pumps were also used in ancient China from at least the 1st century A.D. In China, they were also called dragon backbones. One of the earliest accounts was a description by the Han dynasty philosopher Wang Chong (A.D. 27–97) around A.D. 80. Unlike those found in the West, chain pumps in China resembled the square-pallet type instead of the pear-shaped bucket. Illustrations of such Chinese chain pumps show them drawing water up a slanted channel. These were sometimes powered by hydraulics of a rushing current against a horizontal water wheel acting against a vertical wheel, and others by a horizontal mechanical wheel acting upon a vertical wheel that was pulled by the labor of oxen. There were also square-pallet chain pumps operated by pedals.

From the 1st century onwards, chain pumps were widespread throughout the Chinese countryside. Chinese square-pallet chain pumps were used mostly for irrigation, though they found use in public works as well. The infamous Eastern Han court eunuch Zhang Rang (d. A.D. 189) once ordered the engineer Bi Lan (畢嵐) to construct a series of square-pallet chain pumps outside the capital city Luoyang. These chain pumps serviced the palaces and living quarters of the Luoyang; the water lifted by the chain pumps was brought in by a pipe system. Ma Jun, the renowned mechanical engineer of the Three Kingdoms era, also constructed a series of chain pumps for watering the palatial gardens of Emperor Ming of Wei (226–239).

Washer or chain pumps were used in China over 1000 years ago. During the period of agricultural expansion in Song China (10th–13th centuries CE), the technology of water-rising devices was improved. For some centuries they had been used for moving water for drainage or irrigation purposes. The simplest design, known as the counterbalanced bucket or 'swape' or 'well-sweep' was in common use at that time. A more complicated design, the 'square-pallet chain pump', was introduced several centuries before the growth in Song technology, but had not seen prior use for farming. They became more common around the end of the first millennium AD.

From the 13th century onwards, the Chinese also used windmills (acquired from the Middle East) to power square-pallet chain pumps. Yet there were other types of chain pumps besides the square-pallet design. In Song Yingxing's (1587–1666) encyclopedic book the Tiangong Kaiwu (1637), there is description and illustration of a cylinder chain pump, powered by waterwheels and leading water up from the river to an elevated plain of agricultural crops.

The contribution of chain pumps to agricultural growth during the Song was extolled by poets such as Li Chuquan (李处权) of the twelfth century. The Song government actively spread the technology, introducing pumping equipment and chain pumps to those areas as yet unfamiliar with the technique.

== Use in developing countries ==
In the 1980s Reinder van Tijen an inventor and grass roots activist, with the support of the Royal Tropical Institute of Amsterdam, created and began instructing various communities around the world how to make a rope pump from simple available parts using PVC pipes and plastic moldings. He began at Burkina Faso in Africa, continued to Tunisia, Thailand and Gambia among others. In Nicaragua, the technology was introduced around 1985 and by 2010 there were an estimated 70,000 pumps installed. An estimated 20,000 were installed on wells for rural communal water supply and over 25% of the rural water supply was with rope pumps. The other 50,000 pumps were installed on private wells of rural families and farmers, partly or completely paid for by families themselves, (so called Self-supply). Many rope pumps are now being replaced by electric pumps so families climb "the water ladder". It is also used in other parts of Central America with over 25,000 pumps installed to date. In Africa the improved model of the rope pump was introduced around 1995 but in many countries failed due to the use of outdated designs and lack of long term follow up on quality in production and installation. By the 2020 an estimated 5 million people in 20 countries worldwide were using rope pumps for domestic uses and small scale irrigation.

== Description ==
Rope pump schematic

A rope pump is a type of pump of which the main or most visible component is a continuous piece of rope, in which the rope is integral in raising water from a well. Rope pumps are often used in developing areas, the most common design of which uses PVC pipe and a rope with flexible or rigid valves. Rope pumps are cheap to build and easy to maintain. One design of rope pump using a solar-powered rope pump can pump 3,000 litres to 15 meters per day using an 80 watt solar panel. Rope pumps can be powered by low speed gasoline/diesel engines, electricity, human energy, wind and solar energy.

== Construction ==
The original rope pumps used knots along the rope length but can be made with flexible or rigid valves on the rope instead of knots. Alternatively they may use only rope, simply relying on the water clinging to the rope as it is quickly pulled to the surface.

=== Flexible valve rope pumps ===
Flexible valves can be made from cut pieces of bicycle wheel tubing. The valves are positioned approximately 20 cm apart on the rope. One disadvantage of flexible valve rope pumps is that they must be appropriately sized and thickness for different types, sizes and length of pipes.

=== Rigid valve rope pump ===
Rigid valves using plastic or metal washers that fit tightly into the PVC pipe as the rope is dragged through are also used. If the fit is tight, the washers can be spaced up to half a meter apart. The deeper the well, the smaller the pipe inner diameter must be, given the available power constraints. These rope pumps are often worked with a hand crank

Valves can also be made from knots in the rope itself.

=== Valveless rope pumps ===
Valveless pumps rely on friction with water clinging to the rope, which is moved at high speed, often using a bicycle to produce the required speed. It is a less efficient design but is simpler to construct than the other rope pumps.

== See also ==
- Airlift pump
- Chain drive
- Sakia
- Waterladder pump
