= Kazo =

Kazo ior KAZO may refer to:

== Places ==
- Kazo, Saitama, a city in Japan
- Kazo, Uganda, a town in Uganda
  - Kazo District
- Kazo, Hama, a neighbourhood in Hama, Syria
- KAZO, the ICAO code for Kalamazoo/Battle Creek International Airport

== Other uses ==
- Kazō Kitamori (1916–1998), Japanese theologian
- KAZO-LP, a television station of Nebraska, United States

== See also ==
- Cazo, a place in Spain
- Kaso (disambiguation)
