= Kaso =

Kaso may refer to:

- KASO, an American radio station broadcasting a Classic Hits format
- Kasō, the twelfth single by L'Arc-en-Ciel
- Kásó, a village and municipality in south-eastern Slovakia

== See also ==
- Kaso River (disambiguation)
- Kasos
- Kazo (disambiguation)
- Caso (disambiguation)
