= Hama =

Hama حَمَاة
- City
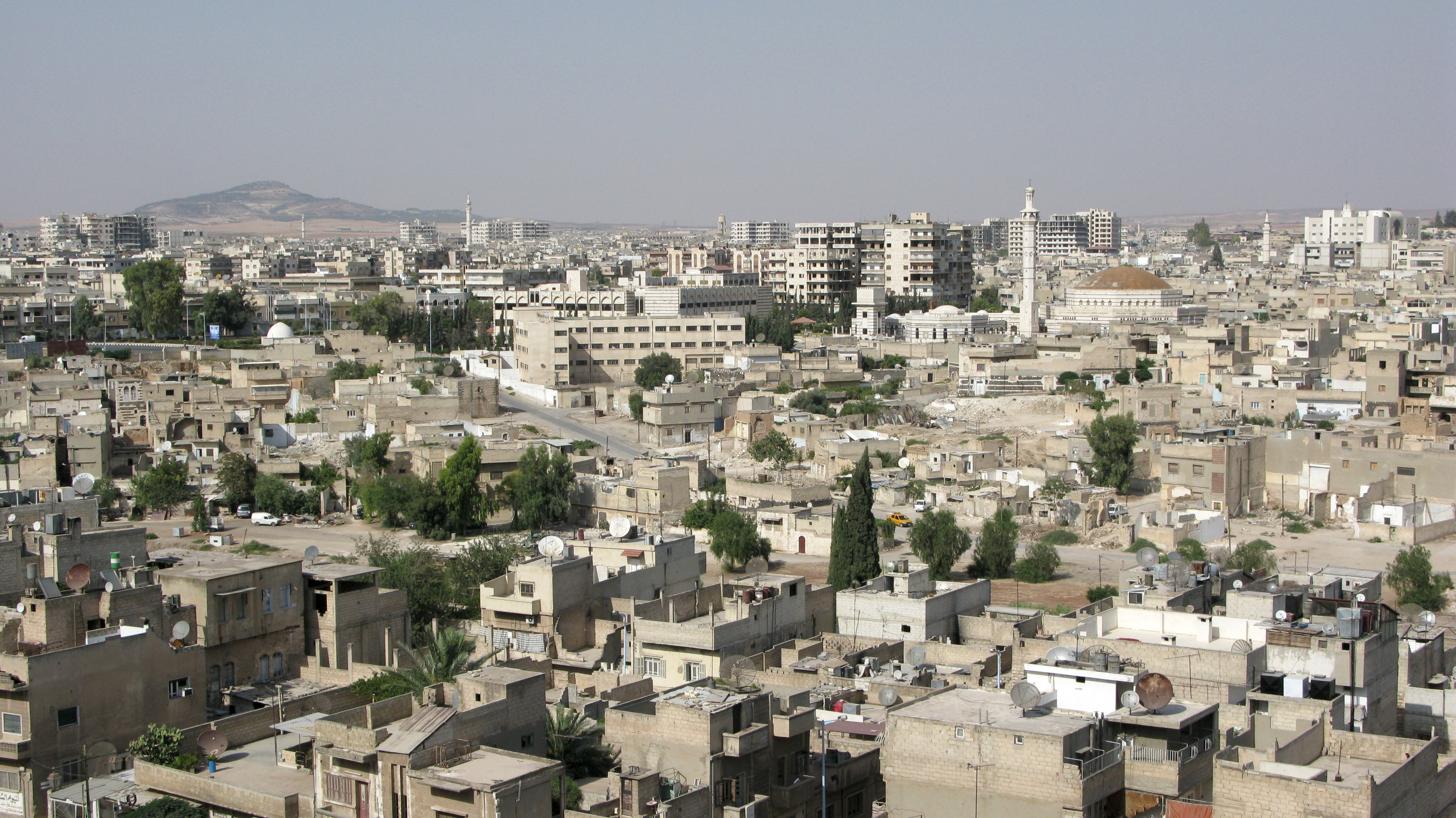
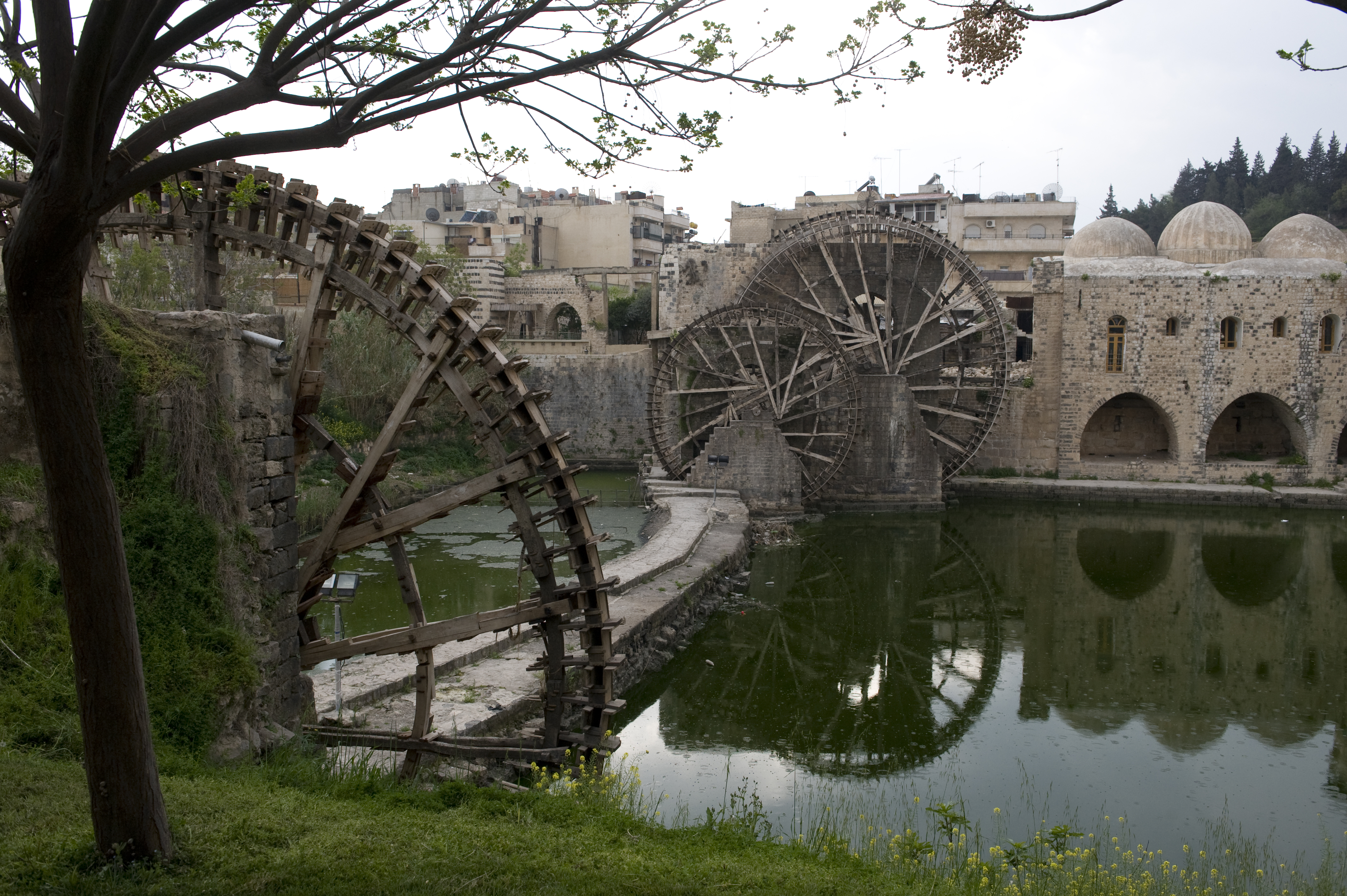
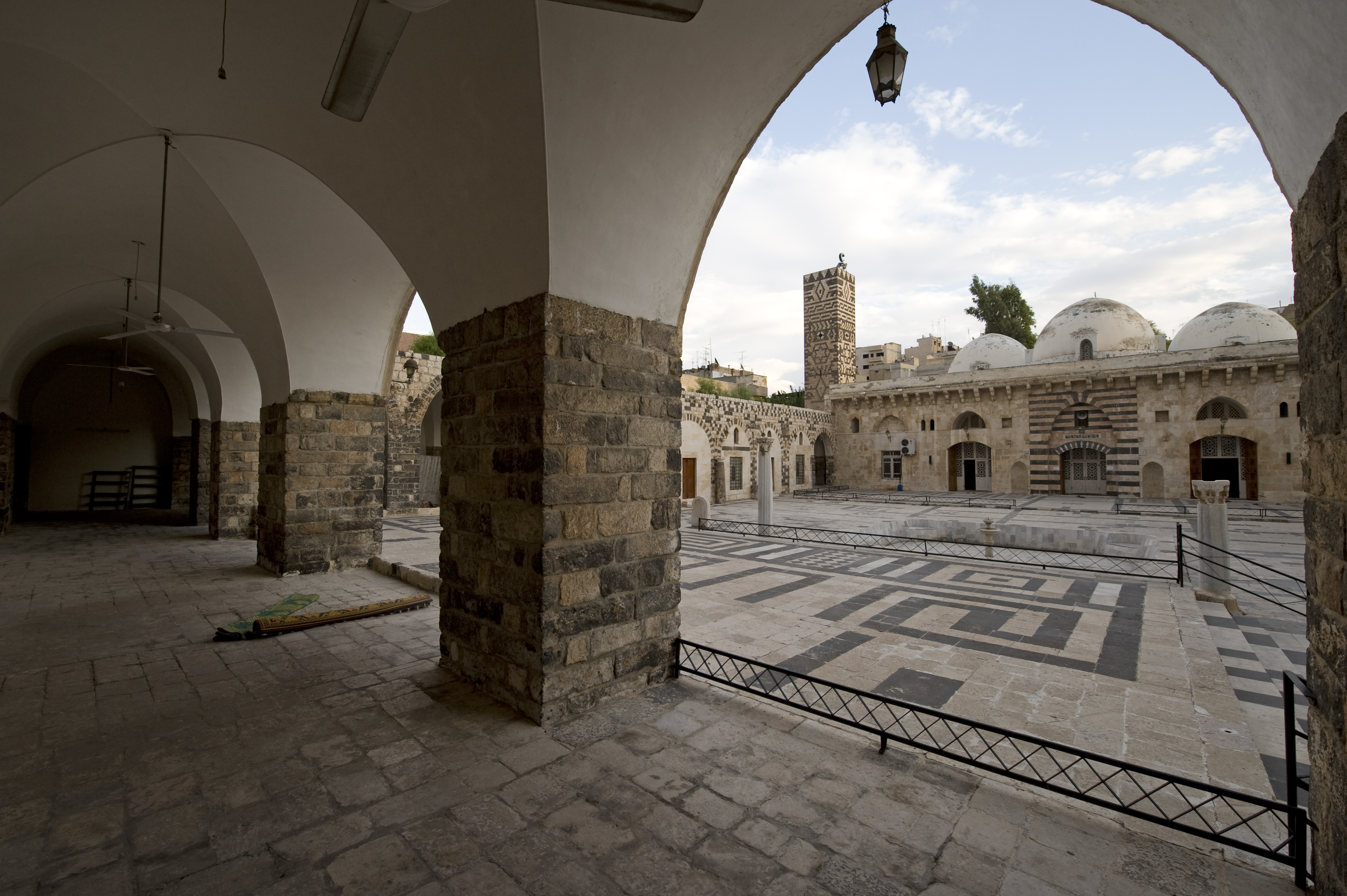
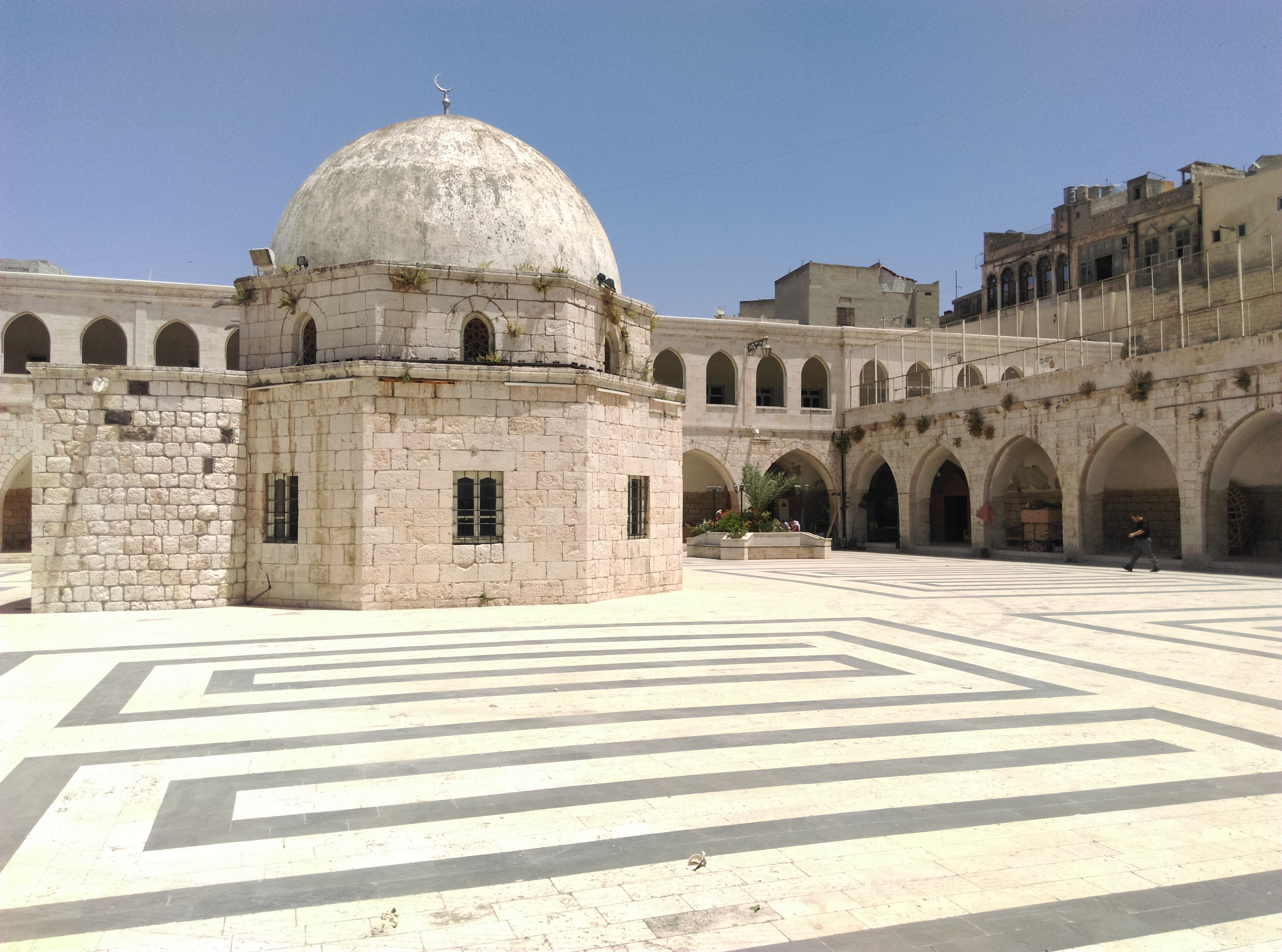
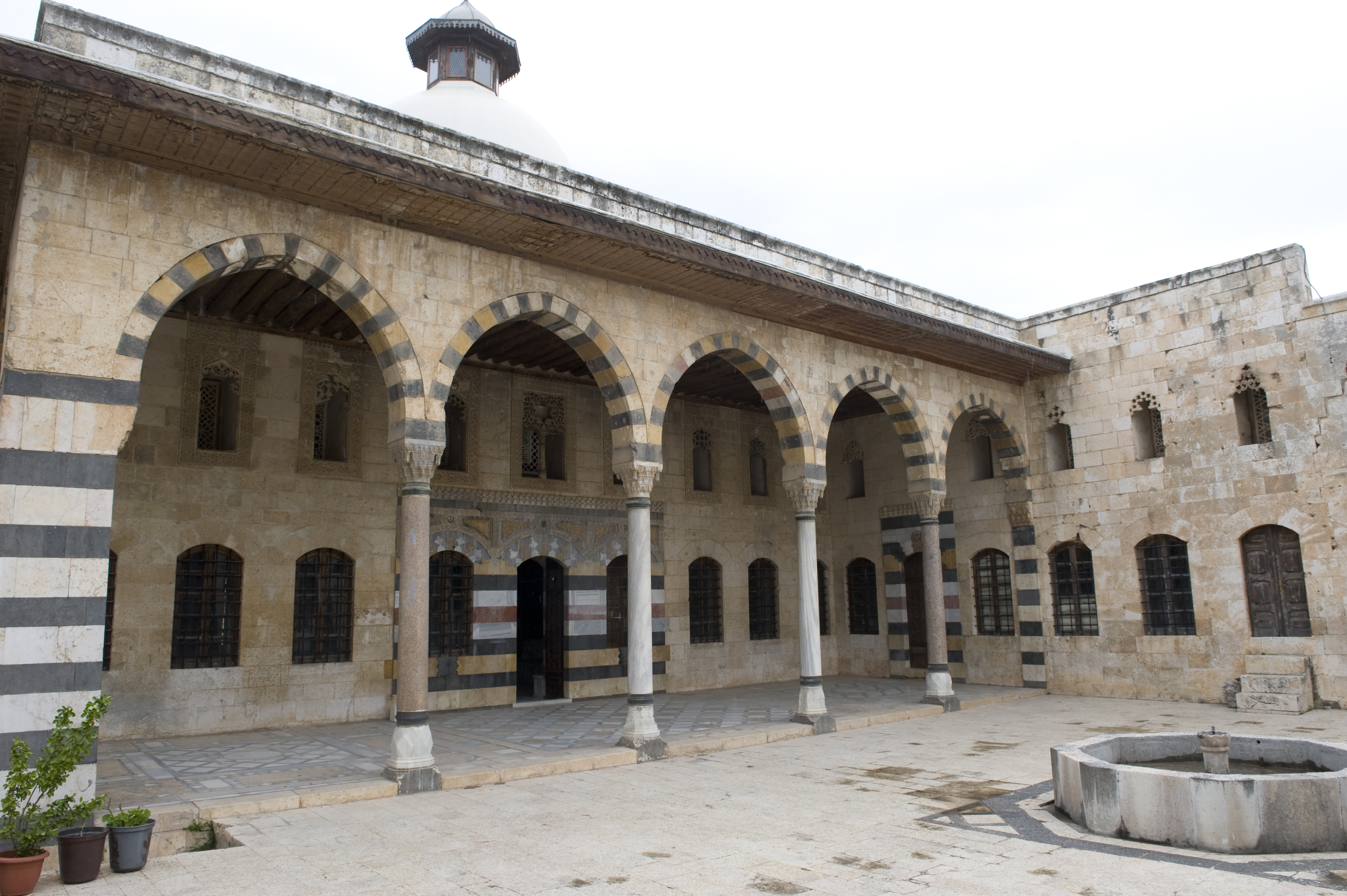
- Hama skyline Norias of Hama Great Mosque of Hama Khan Rustem Pasha Al-Azm Palace
- Nicknames: Mother of Norias (أم النواعير); City of Abulfeda (مدينة أبي الفداء)
- Interactive map of Hama
- Location in Syria Hama (Eastern Mediterranean) Hama (Asia)
- Coordinates: 35°08′06″N 36°45′00″E
- Country: Syria
- Governorate: Hama Governorate
- District: Hama District
- Subdistrict: Hama Subdistrict
- First settled: 15th century BCE
- Elevation: 305 m (1,001 ft)

Population (2010)
  - Total: 546 604
  - Ethnicities: Syrians
  - Religions: Sunni Islam; Syriac Orthodox Church; Greek Orthodox Church
- Demonym(s): Arabic: حموي, romanized: Ḥamawiyy
- Time zone: UTC+3 (AST)
- Area codes: Country code: +963; City code: 33
- Geocode: C2987
- Climate: BSk

Hama (Note: UK: /ˈhæmə/, US: /ˈhɑːmə/; Arabic: حَمَاة, romanized: Ḥamāh, IPA: [ħaˈmaː]) is a city on the banks of the Orontes River in west-central Syria. It is located 213 kilometres (132 mi) north of Damascus and 46 km (29 mi) north of Homs. It is the provincial capital of the Hama Governorate. Hama is one of the four largest cities in Syria, alongside Damascus, Aleppo and Homs. Hama is known for its cheesemaking tradition, notably reflected in a signature local dessert, Halawet el Jibn.

The city is renowned for its seventeen norias, which are claimed to date back to 1100 BC. Though historically used for irrigation, the norias are used purely for show today and function solely as a tourist attraction and a symbol of the city.

== History ==
The ancient settlement of Hamath was occupied from the early Neolithic to the Iron Age.

=== Neolithic ===
The stratigraphy is very generalized, which makes detailed comparison to other sites difficult. Level M (6 m or 20 ft thick) contained both white ware (lime-plaster) and true pottery. It may be contemporary with Ras Shamra V (6000–5000 BC).

=== Chalcolithic ===
Remains from the Chalcolithic period have been uncovered by Danish archaeologists on the mount on which the former citadel once stood. The excavation took place between 1931 and 1938 under the direction of Harald Ingholt. The overlying level L dates to the Chalcolithic Halaf culture.

=== Middle Bronze Age ===
==== Middle Bronze I ====
- Level H5 (MB I)

==== Middle Bronze II ====
Hama is closely associated with the Kingdom of Ebla, a vassal of the Great Kingdom of Yamhad (Aleppo). To the east and south is the rival Kingdom of Qatna.

- Level H4-3 (MB IIA)
- Level H2-1 (MB IIB)

=== Late Bronze Age ===
==== Mitanni period ====
Although the town appears to be unmentioned in cuneiform sources before the first millennium BC, the site appears to have been prosperous around 1500 BC, when it was presumably an Amorite dependency of Mitanni, an empire along the Euphrates in northeastern Syria.

==== Hittite period ====
By around 1350 BC, Mitanni was overthrown by the Hittites, who controlled all of northern Syria.

In the south, the Hittites were in conflict with the Egyptians. Hamath became an important urban centre. The conflict culminated in the famous Battle of Kadesh against Ancient Egypt under Ramesses II near Homs in 1285 BC.

In early 19th century, Johann Ludwig Burckhardt was the first to discover Hittite or Luwian hieroglyphic script at Hama.

=== Iron Age ===
The Fall of the Hittite Empire saw the Neo-Hittite/Aramaean Hama attested as the capital of one of the prosperous Syro-Hittite states known from the Hebrew Bible as Hamath (Aramaic: Ḥmt; Hittite: Amatuwana; Syriac: ܚܡܳܬ, romanized: ħ(ə)mɑθ, lit. 'fortress', Biblical Hebrew: חֲמָת, romanized: Ḥămāṯ), which traded extensively, particularly with Israel and Judah.

==== Assyrian inscriptions ====
When the Assyrian king Shalmaneser III (858–824 BC) conquered the north of Aramea, he reached Hamath (Assyrian: Amat or Hamata) in 853 BC; this marks the beginning of Assyrian inscriptions relating to the kingdom. Irhuleni of Hamath and Hadadezer of Aram-Damascus (biblical "Bar-Hadad") led a coalition of Aramean cities against the encroaching Assyrian armies. According to Assyrian sources, they were confronted by 4,000 chariots, 2,000 horsemen, 62,000-foot-soldiers and 1,000 Arab camel-riders in the Battle of Qarqar. The attested win for the Assyrians seems to have actually been more of a draw, although Shalmaneser III continued on to the shore and even took a ship to open sea. In the following years, Shalmaneser III failed to conquer Hamath or Aram-Damascus. After the death of Shalmaneser III, the former allies Hamath and Aram-Damascus fell out, and Aram-Damascus seems to have taken over some of Hamath's territory.

An Aramaic inscription of Zakkur, dual king of Hamath and Luhuti, tells of an attack by a coalition including Sam'al under Ben-Hadad III, son of Hazael, king of Aram-Damascus. Zakir was besieged in his fortress of Hazrak, but saved by intervention of the God Baalshamin. Later on, the state of Sam'al came to rule both Hamath and Aram.

In 743 BC, Tiglath-Pileser III took a number of towns in the territory of Hamath, distributed the territories among his generals, and forcibly removed 1,223 selected inhabitants to the valley of the Upper Tigris; he exacted tribute from Hamath's king, Eni-Ilu (Eniel).

In 738 BC, Hamath is listed among the cities again conquered by Assyrian troops. Over 30,000 natives were deported to Ullaba (located in Urartu) and replaced with captives from the Zagros Mountains.

==== Destruction under Sargon II ====
After the fall of the northern kingdom of Israel, Hamath's king Ilu-Bi'di (Jau-Bi'di) led a failed revolt of the newly organized Assyrian provinces of Arpad, Simirra, Damascus, and Samara.

Styling himself the "Destroyer of Hamath," Sargon II razed the city c. 720 BC, recolonised it with 6300 Assyrians and removed its king to be flayed alive in Assyria. He also carried off to Nimrud the ivory-adorned furnishings of its kings.

Displaced persons from Hamath subsequently comprised an important part of the multi-ethnic Aramaean community at Elephantine and Syene (now Aswan) in Egypt starting in 700 BC, where alongside similarly displaced Jews they produced a large corpus of materials in Imperial Aramaic known as the Elephantine papyri and ostraca.

=== Persian, Hellenistic and Roman history ===
In 539 BC, Cyrus the Great, King of Achaemenid Empire, took Syria as part of his empire, to be known as Eber-Nari. In July 522 BC, Cambyses II died at a location called Agbatana, which is most likely the modern city of Hama.

In the second half of the 4th century BC the modern region of Syria came under the influence of Greco-Roman culture, following long lasting semitic and Persian cultures. Alexander the Great's campaign from 334 to 323 BC brought Syria under Hellenic rule. Since the country lay on the trade routes from Asia to Greece, Hama and many other Syrian cities again grew rich through trade. After the death of Alexander the Great his Near East conquests were divided between his generals, and Seleucus Nicator became ruler of Syria and the founder of the Seleucid dynasty. Under the Seleucids there was a revival in the fortunes of Hama. The Aramaeans were allowed to return to the city, which was renamed Epiphaneia (Ancient Greek: Ἐπιφάνεια), after the Seleucid Emperor Antiochus IV Epiphanes. Seleucid rule began to decline, however, in the next two centuries, and Arab dynasties began to gain control of cities in this part of Syria, including Hama.

The Romans took over original settlements such as Hama and made them their own. They met little resistance when they invaded Syria under Pompey and annexed it in 64 BC, whereupon Hama became part of the Roman province of Syria, ruled from Rome by a proconsul. Hama was an important city during the Greek and Roman periods, but very little archaeological evidence remains. As Syria became part of the Roman Empire, five hundred Hamian archers, known as "Cohors Prima Hamiorum Sagittaria", were stationed at Magnis on Hadrian's Wall in northern Britain starting from AD 120. The same unit or another one was later renamed to "Numerus Syrorum Saggitariorum" and located at Derventio Brigantum (Malton). The garrison unit was transferred to Bar Hill Fort on the Antonine Wall in Scotland in AD 142–157, then back to Magnis in AD 163–166, during the early reign of Marcus Aurelius. They might have also stationed at Housesteads, as a tombstone of an archer was located there. However, the cohort's presence in Britain was proven by military diplomas, found in Stannington (AD 122) and Ravenglass (AD 124), in addition to altars dedicated to Syrian Goddesses discovered at Catterick.

In AD 330, the capital of the Roman Empire was moved to Byzantium, and the city continued to prosper. In Byzantine days, Hama was known as Emath or Emathoùs (Εμαθούς in Greek). Roman rule from Byzantium meant the Christian religion was strengthened throughout the Near East, and churches were built in Hama and other cities. The Byzantine historian John of Epiphania was born in Hama in the 6th century.

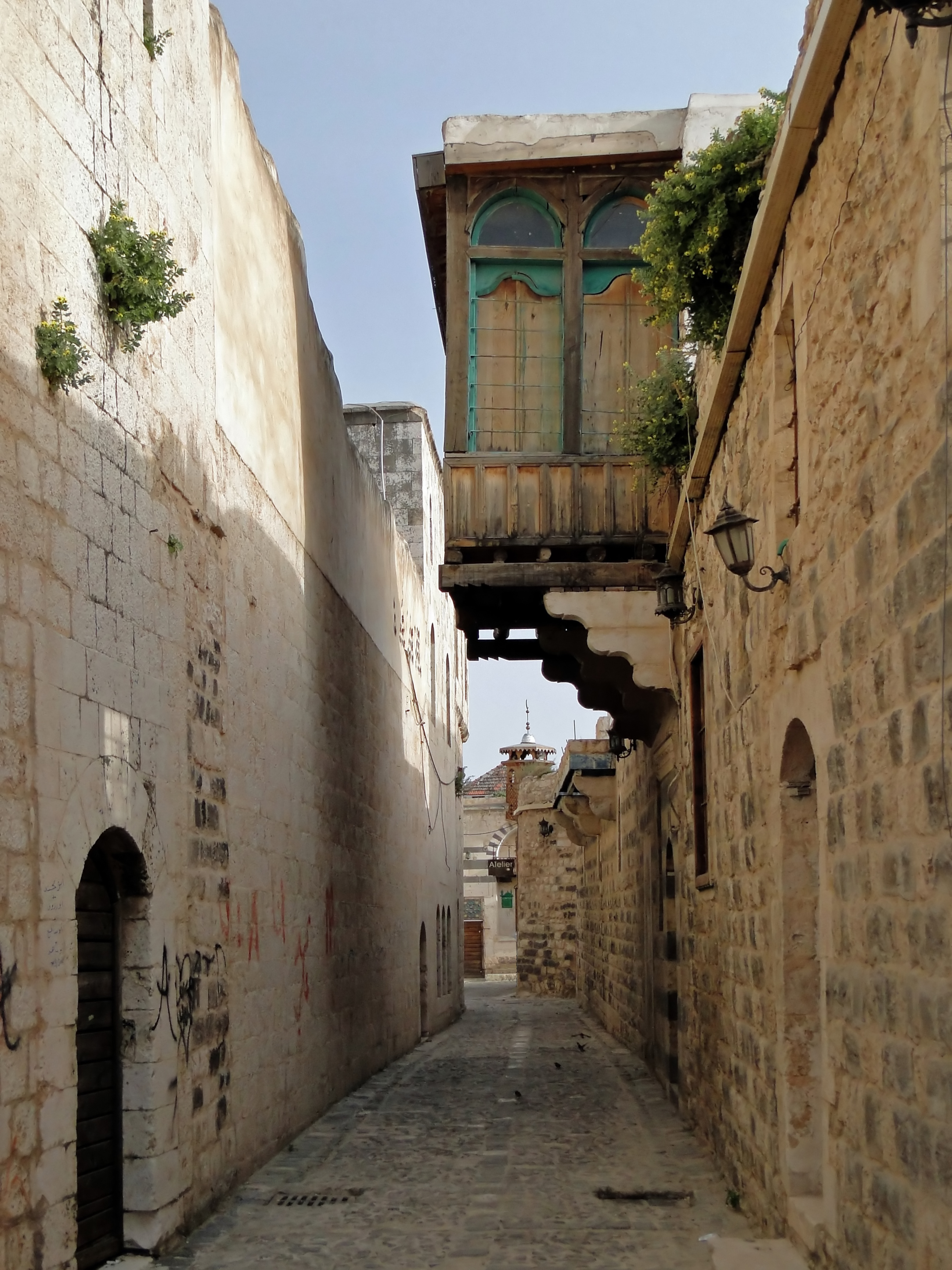
An alley in old Hama

Two main personalities from Hama were documented during Greek-Roman times. The first is Eustathius of Epiphaneia (Ancient Greek: Εὐστάθιος Ἐπιφανεύς), who was a Greek historian but all his works were lost. His most famous work was the "Brief Chronicle" (Ancient Greek: Χρονικὴν ἐπιτομὴν). The second personality is Euphrates the Stoic, who was from Epiphaneia according to Stephanus of Byzantium.

=== Early Islamic period ===
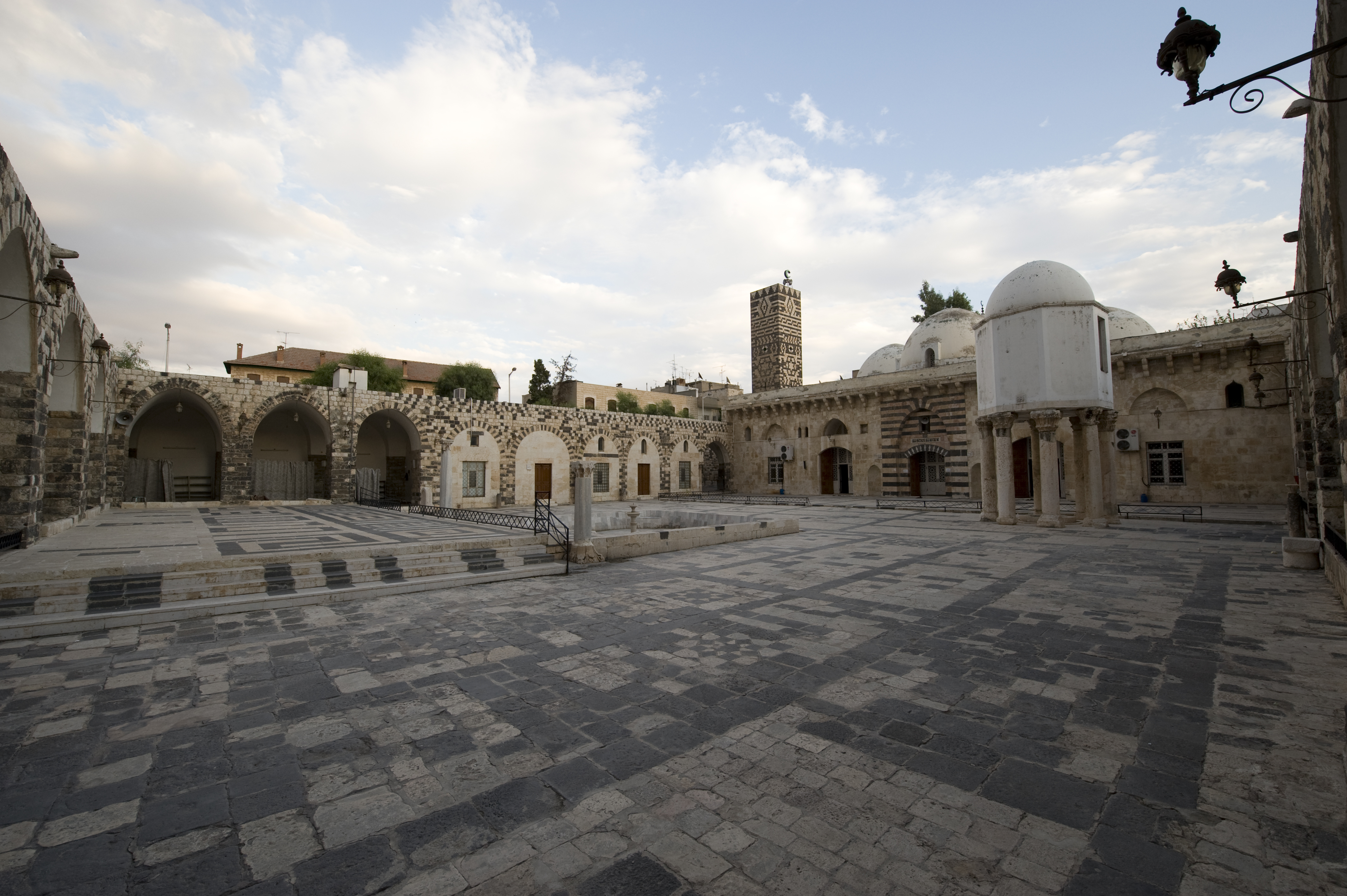
Great Mosque of Hama

Hama was conquered by Muslim forces under Abu Ubayda ibn al-Jarrah in 638 or 639, during the Muslim conquest of Syria. The town thereafter regained its ancient name and has since retained it. Little is known about Hama during the early Muslim period. After its capitulation to the Muslims, it became administratively part of Jund Hims (the military district of Homs), remaining as such through the 10th century. During Umayyad rule (661–750), it contained a congregational mosque, likely erected on the remains of a Byzantine-era church, parts of which were utilized in the mosque's construction.

Under Abbasid rule (750–late 9th century), the caliph al-Mahdi (r. 775–785) restored the mosque. During the reign of Caliph al-Mu'tadid (r. 892–902), Hama was large, walled trading town. On 29 November 903, the army of al-Mu'tadid's successor, Caliph al-Muktafi, defeated the Qarmatians, an Isma'ili Shia movement embraced by many Bedouin in the Syrian Desert, at the Battle of Hama, ending their dominance of the Syrian Desert.

In 944, the Hamdanids under Sayf al-Dawla captured the northern Syrian city of Aleppo and by the following year expanded their control to Jund Hims. Hama was thus incorporated into the Hamdanid emirate of Aleppo. (Writing in 985, the Jerusalemite geographer al-Muqaddasi noted the city had become a part of Jund Qinnasrin (the military district of northern Syria); the junds had become nominal administrative divisions by this point). Hama remained in the orbit of Aleppo until the 12th century. These were considered the 'dark years' of Hama as the local rulers of northern and southern Syria struggled for dominance in the region. The Byzantines under emperor Nicephorus Phocas raided the town in 968 and burned the Great Mosque. By the 11th century, the Fatimids gained suzerainty over northern Syria and during this period, the Aleppo-based Mirdasids sacked Hama. The Persian geographer Nasir Khusraw noted in 1047 that Hama was "well populated" and stood on the banks of the Orontes River.

=== Middle Islamic period ===
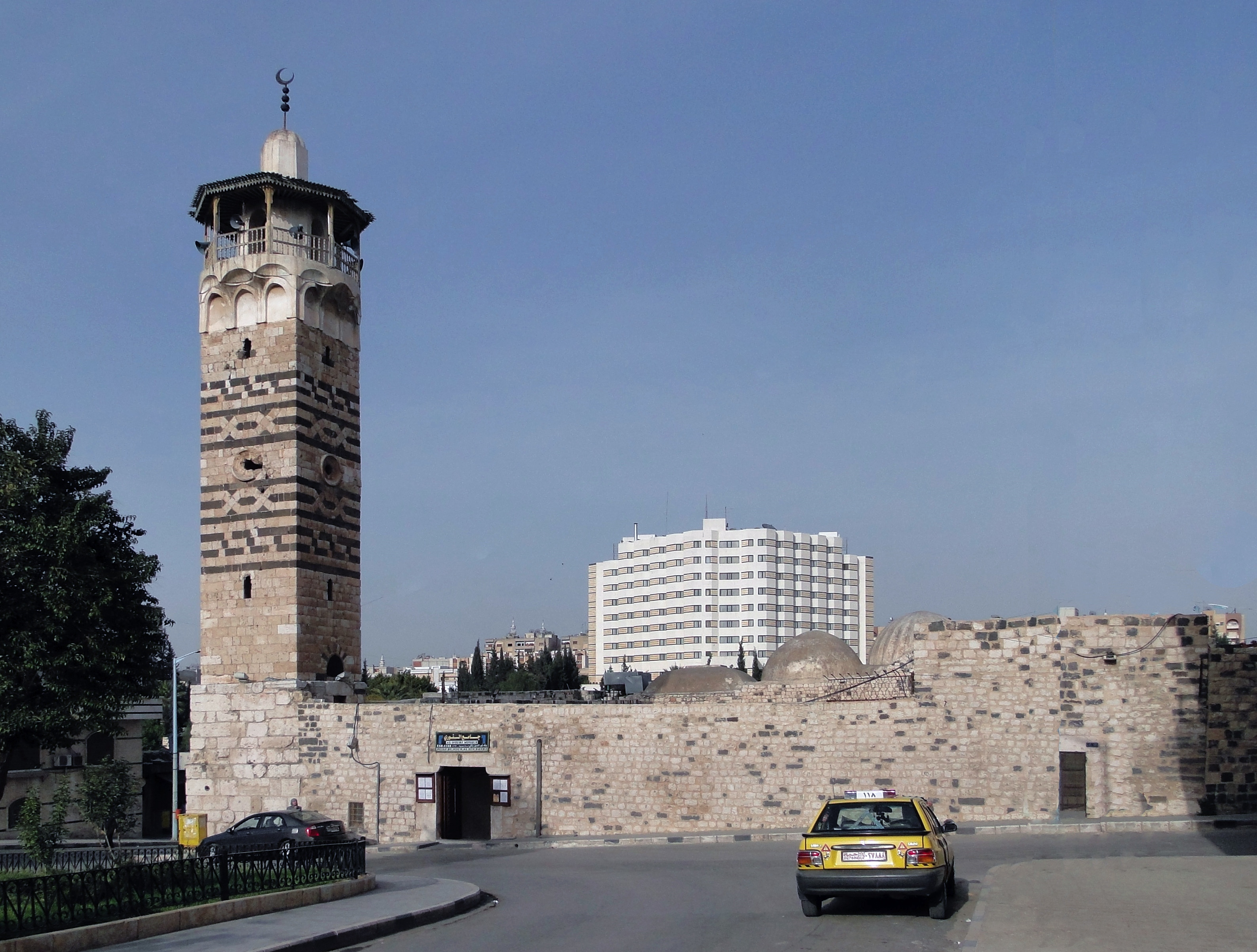
Nur al-Din Mosque

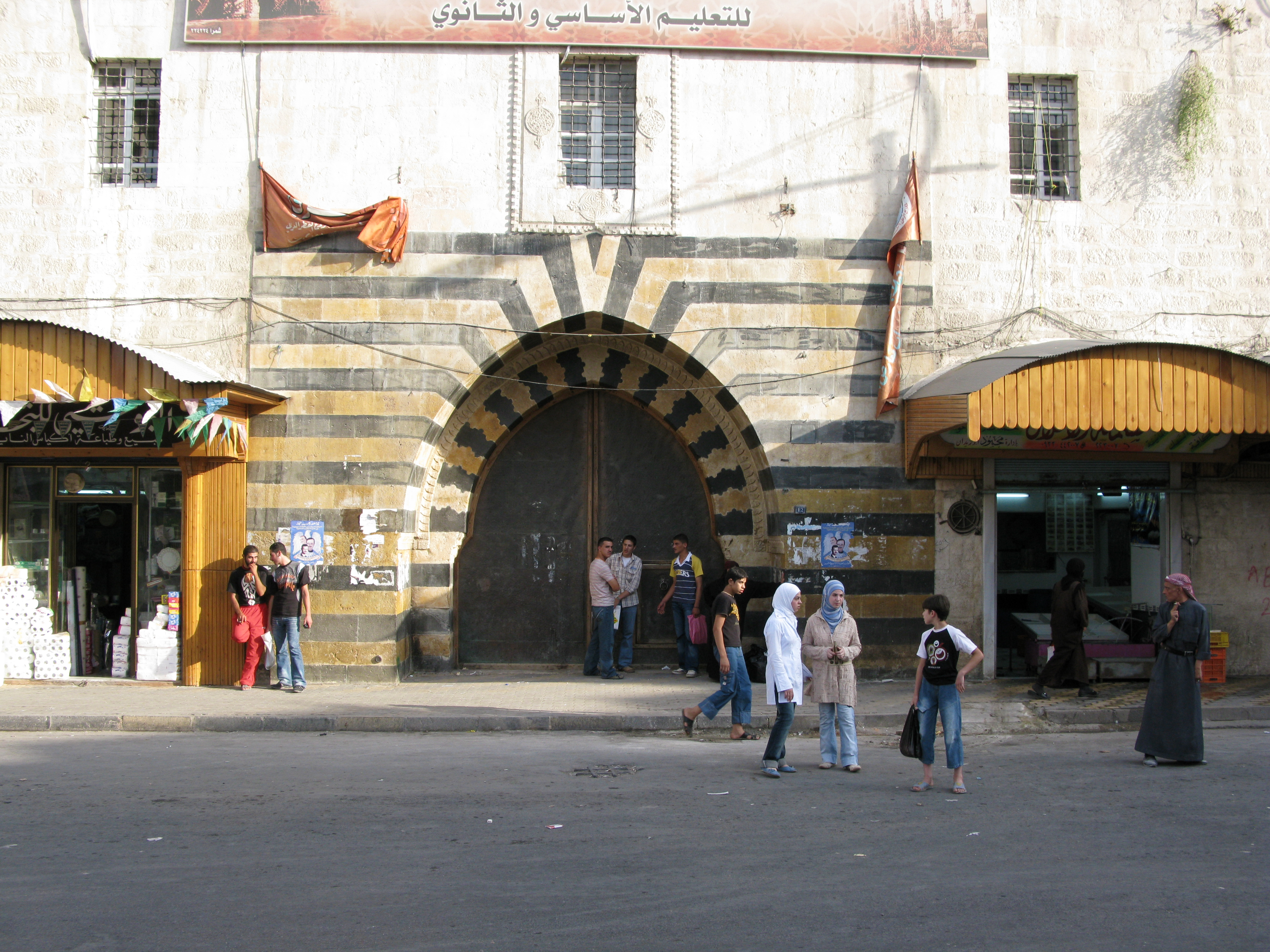
The gate in the old city of Hama, Mamluk architecture

The Crusader Tancred, Prince of Galilee, took Hama in 1108, but in 1114 the Crusaders lost it definitively to the Seljuks, during the reign of Toghtekin, atabeg of Damascus. By 1154, the Zengid ruler of Aleppo, Nur al-Din conquered Damascus and thus brought Muslim Syria, including Hama, under his control (the coastal regions were under Crusader rule). In 1157 two earthquakes cumulatively shattered the city and caused immense damage to the neighboring towns of Maarrat al-Numan, Shaizar and Kafartab. The first earthquake, on 13 July, left Hama partly in ruins and repairs were undertaken by Nur al-Din to the city's walls in early August to prevent Crusader forces from taking advantage of its damaged state. The more severe earthquake, on 12 August, collapsed most of the town, its fortress and citadel, and all its large residences, which were clustered around the Orontes, killing most of Hama's inhabitants. Afterward, the citadel walls and the Hassanayn Mosque were rebuilt; a surviving inscription on a small mosque south of the citadel notes that structure was rebuilt after its destruction in the 1157 earthquake. In 1172, Nur al-Din built the city's current Great Mosque with a tall, square minaret.

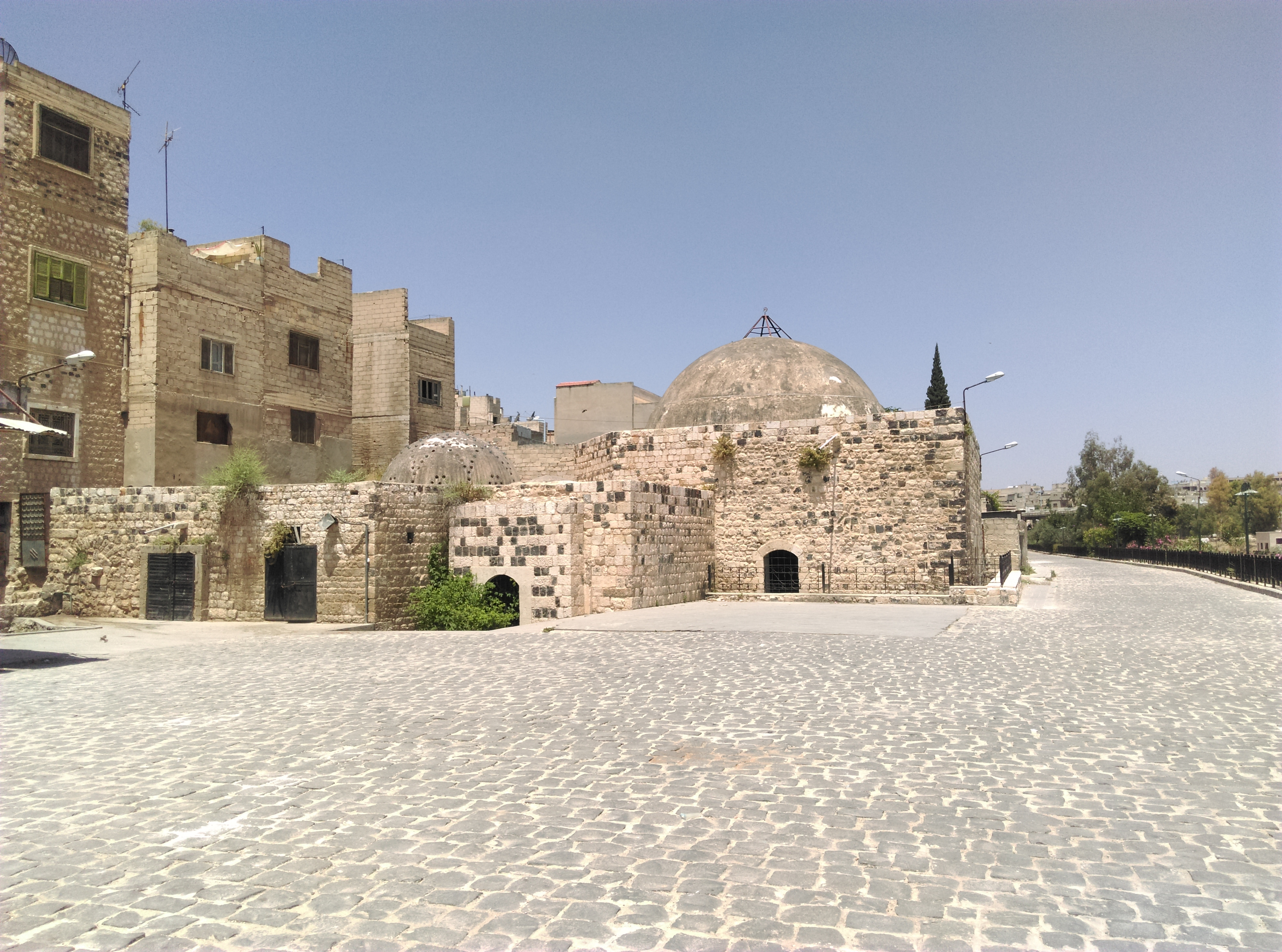
Hammam Al-Sultan

In 1175, Hama was taken from the Zengids by Saladin. He granted the city to his nephew, al-Muzaffar Umar, four years later, putting it under the rule of his Ayyubid family. This ushered in an era of stability and prosperity in Hama as the Ayyubids ruled it almost continuously until 1342. Geographer Yaqut al-Hamawi, who was born in Hama, described it in 1225 as a large town surrounded by a strongly built wall. Hama was sacked by the Mongols in 1260, as were most other Syrian cities, but the Mongols were defeated that same year and then again in 1303 by the Mamluks who succeeded the Ayyubids as rulers of the region. Hama briefly passed to Mamluk control in 1299 after the death of governor al-Mansur Mahmoud II. However, unlike other former Ayyubid cities, the Mamluks reinstated Ayyubid rule in Hama by making Abu al-Fida, the historian and geographer, governor of the city and he reigned from 1310 to 1332. He described his city as "very ancient... mentioned in the book of the Israelites. It is one of the pleasantest places in Syria." After his death, he was succeeded by his son al-Afdal Muhammad who eventually lost Mamluk favor and was deposed. Thus, Hama came under direct Mamluk control.

Hama grew prosperous during the Ayyubid period, as well as the Mamluk period. It gradually expanded to both banks of the Orontes River, with the suburb on the right bank being connected to the town proper by a newly built bridge. The town on the left bank was divided into upper and lower parts, each of which was surrounded by a wall. The city was filled with palaces, markets, mosques, madrasas, and a hospital, and over thirty different sized norias (water-wheels). In addition, there stood a massive citadel in Hama. Moreover, a special aqueduct brought drinking water to Hama from the neighboring town of Salamiyah.

Ibn Battuta visited Hama in 1335 and remarked that the Orontes River made the city "pleasant to live in, with its many gardens full of trees and fruits." He also speaks of a large suburb called al-Mansuriyyah (named after an Ayyubid emir) that contained "a fine market, a mosque, and bathes." In 1400, Timurlane took Hama, along with nearby Homs and Baalbek.

=== Ottoman rule ===
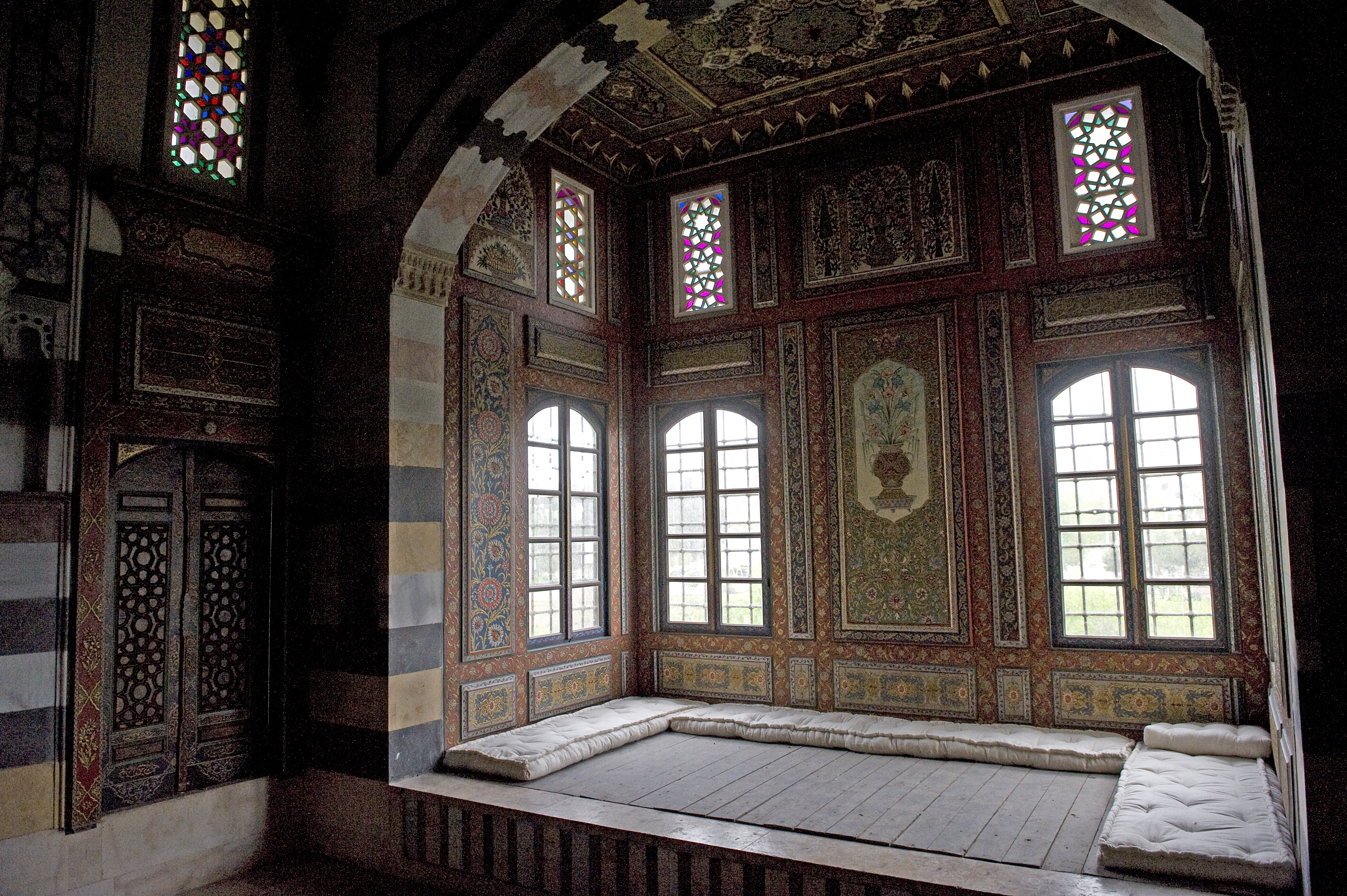
A room in Al-Azm Palace in Hama (1742)

The prosperous period of Mamluk rule came to an end in 1516, when the Ottoman Turks conquered Syria from the Mamluks after defeating them at the Battle of Marj Dabiq near Aleppo. Hama, and the rest of Syria, came under Ottoman rule from Constantinople. Under the Ottomans, Hama gradually became more important in the administrative structure of the region. It was first made capital of one of the liwas ("districts") of the eyalet ("province") of Tripoli. Hama once again became an important center for trade routes running east from the Mediterranean coast into Asia. A number of khans ("caravansaries") were built in the city, like Khan Rustum Pasha which dates from 1556. The governor of Hama was tasked in 1692 with settling Turkoman nomads in the Hama-Homs region under the aegis of the Ottoman Empire's tribal settlement program.

Then in the 18th century, it became a part of the holdings of the governor of Damascus. The governors of Damascus at this time were the Azems, who also ruled other parts of Syria, for the Ottomans. They erected sumptuous residences in Hama, including the Azem Palace and Khan As'ad Pasha which were built by As'ad Pasha al-Azem, who governed Hama for a number of years until 1742. By then, there were 14 caravansaries in the city, mostly used for the storage and distribution of seeds, cotton, wool, and other commodities. After the passing of the Vilayet Law in 1864, Hama became the capital of the Sanjak of Hama (gaining the city more administrative powers), part of the larger vilayet of Sham.

=== Modern history ===
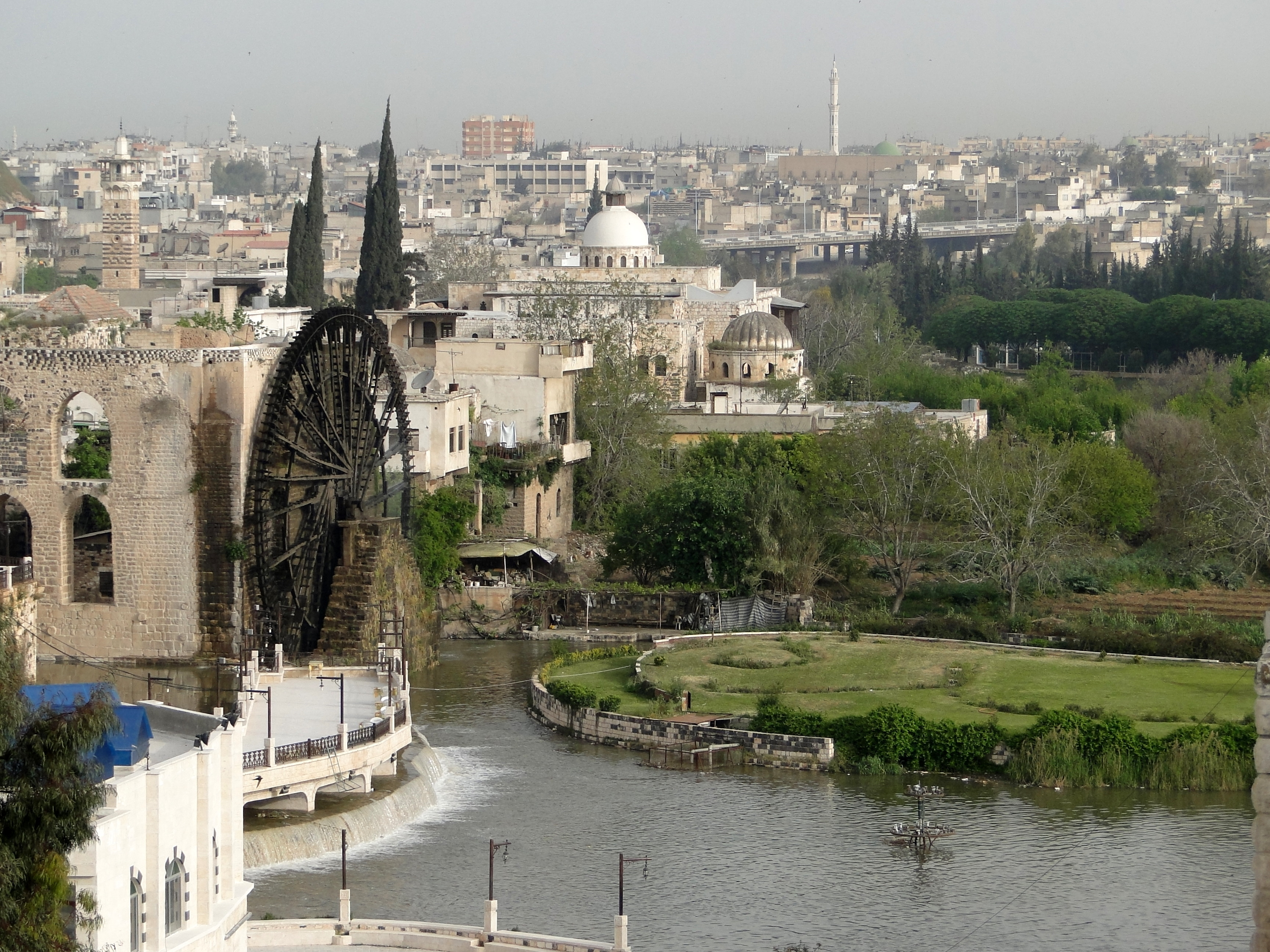
General view

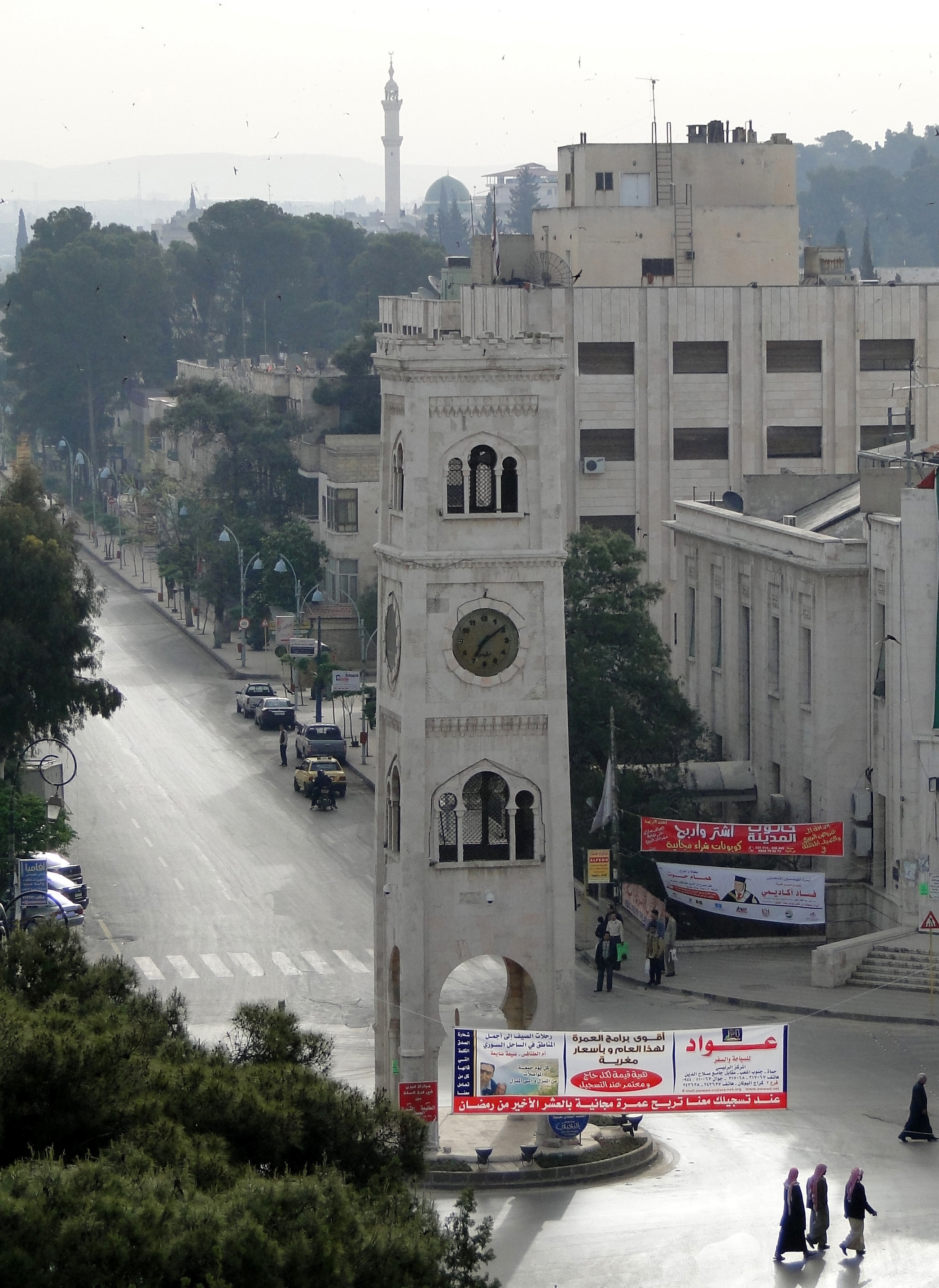
The clock tower of Hama

Ottoman rule ended in 1918, after their defeat in World War I to the Allied Forces. Hama was made part of the French Mandate of Syria. By then, Hama had developed into what it has remained: a medium-sized provincial town, important as the market for an agricultural area abundant in cereals, but also cotton and sugar beets. It gained notoriety as the center of large estates worked by peasants and dominated by a few magnate families. The 1925 Hama uprising occurred in the city during the Great Syrian Revolt against the French.

During the French Mandate, the district of Hama contained within its bounds the municipality of Hama and 114 villages. By an estimate in 1930, only four of these villages were owned outright by local cultivators, while sharing ownership of two villages with a notable family. Thus, the hinterland was owned by landowning elites. Starting in the late 1940s, significant class conflict erupted as agricultural workers sought reform in Hama.

Syria gained full independence from France in 1946. Akram al-Hawrani, a member of an impoverished notable family in Hama, began to agitate for land reform and better social conditions. He made Hama the base of his Arab Socialist Party, which later merged with another socialist party, the Ba'ath. This party's ascent to power in 1963 signalled the end of power for the landowning elite.

The political insurgency by Sunni Islamist groups, particularly the Muslim Brotherhood, occurred in the city, which was reputed as a stronghold of conservative Sunni Islam. As early as the spring of 1964, Hama became the epicentre of an uprising by conservative forces, encouraged by speeches from mosque preachers, denouncing the policies of the Ba'ath. The Syrian government sent tanks and troops into the quarters of Hama's old city to put down the insurrection.

In the early 1980s, Hama had emerged as a major source of opposition to the Ba'ath government during the Sunni armed Islamist uprising, which had begun in 1976. The city was a focal point for bloody events in the 1981 massacre and the most notable 1982 Hama massacre. The most serious insurrection of the Syrian Islamist uprising happened in Hama during February 1982, when Government forces, led by the president's brother, Rifaat al-Assad, quelled the revolt in Hama with very harsh means. Tanks and artillery shelled the neighbourhoods held by the insurgents indiscriminately, which resulted in part of the old city being razed, such as the al kelani neighbourhood which was part of the old city which was flattened completely, massively reducing old Hama to a single street. Government forces are alleged to have executed thousands of prisoners and civilian residents after subduing the revolt, which became known as the Hama massacre. The events were largely unperported and regarded as highly sensitive in Ba'athist Syria. The Hama massacre led to the military term "Hama Rules" meaning the complete large-scale destruction of a military objective or target.

=== Syrian civil war ===
The city was the site of one of the largest protest movements during the Syrian uprising. However, there was minimal armed conflict-mostly in the early stages of armed uprising-and the city remained under the control of the regular army for most of the war.

On 30 November 2024, in the wake of the Battle of Aleppo, Syrian government forces retreated as opposition forces began to push toward the city. A few days later, on 5 December, the Syrian Salvation Government led by Tahrir al-Sham captured the city from the Bashar al-Assad government after taking the control of the city of Aleppo a week before.

== Climate ==
Its climate is classified as semi-arid (BSk) in Köppen-Geiger system. Hama's inland location ensures that it receives no softening coastal influences and breezes from the Mediterranean Sea. As a result, the city has a much hotter and drier climate than nearby Homs.

Climate data for Hama (1991–2020 normals, extremes 1956–2004)
Month	Jan	Feb	Mar	Apr	May	Jun	Jul	Aug	Sep	Oct	Nov	Dec	Year
Record high °C (°F)	20.0 (68.0)	23.1 (73.6)	28.0 (82.4)	36.2 (97.2)	41.0 (105.8)	42.0 (107.6)	45.2 (113.4)	45.0 (113.0)	42.2 (108.0)	37.6 (99.7)	31.0 (87.8)	25.2 (77.4)	45.2 (113.4)
Mean daily maximum °C (°F)	12.3 (54.1)	14.7 (58.5)	18.9 (66.0)	23.6 (74.5)	30.0 (86.0)	34.6 (94.3)	36.6 (97.9)	36.7 (98.1)	33.7 (92.7)	28.4 (83.1)	20.2 (68.4)	14.0 (57.2)	25.3 (77.6)
Daily mean °C (°F)	8.1 (46.6)	9.8 (49.6)	13.0 (55.4)	17.1 (62.8)	22.6 (72.7)	26.9 (80.4)	29.6 (85.3)	29.7 (85.5)	26.7 (80.1)	21.6 (70.9)	14.3 (57.7)	9.6 (49.3)	19.1 (66.4)
Mean daily minimum °C (°F)	3.9 (39.0)	4.8 (40.6)	7.0 (44.6)	10.6 (51.1)	15.2 (59.4)	19.2 (66.6)	22.5 (72.5)	22.6 (72.7)	19.6 (67.3)	14.8 (58.6)	8.4 (47.1)	5.1 (41.2)	12.8 (55.1)
Record low °C (°F)	−8.3 (17.1)	−7.3 (18.9)	−3.0 (26.6)	−0.5 (31.1)	5.9 (42.6)	10.6 (51.1)	14.7 (58.5)	14.0 (57.2)	9.5 (49.1)	2.2 (36.0)	−3.7 (25.3)	−5.5 (22.1)	−8.3 (17.1)
Average precipitation mm (inches)	72.5 (2.85)	54.3 (2.14)	49.3 (1.94)	32.3 (1.27)	10.3 (0.41)	3.8 (0.15)	0.4 (0.02)	0.1 (0.00)	1.8 (0.07)	21.4 (0.84)	40.0 (1.57)	66.5 (2.62)	352.7 (13.89)
Average precipitation days (≥ 1.0 mm)	9.9	8.1	7.4	4.5	1.8	0.3	0.0	0.0	0.3	2.8	5.1	9.0	49.2
Average relative humidity (%)	81	75	69	61	49	40	39	42	43	51	69	83	58
Mean monthly sunshine hours	127.1	151.2	217.0	249.0	325.5	366.0	387.5	356.5	312.0	257.3	192.0	130.2	3,071.3
Mean daily sunshine hours	4.1	5.4	7.0	8.3	10.5	12.2	12.5	11.5	10.4	8.3	6.4	4.2	8.4
Source 1: NOAA (precipitation and sun 1961–1990) Meteostat
Source 2: Deutscher Wetterdienst (extremes 1956–2004, and humidity 1973–1993)

== Demographics ==
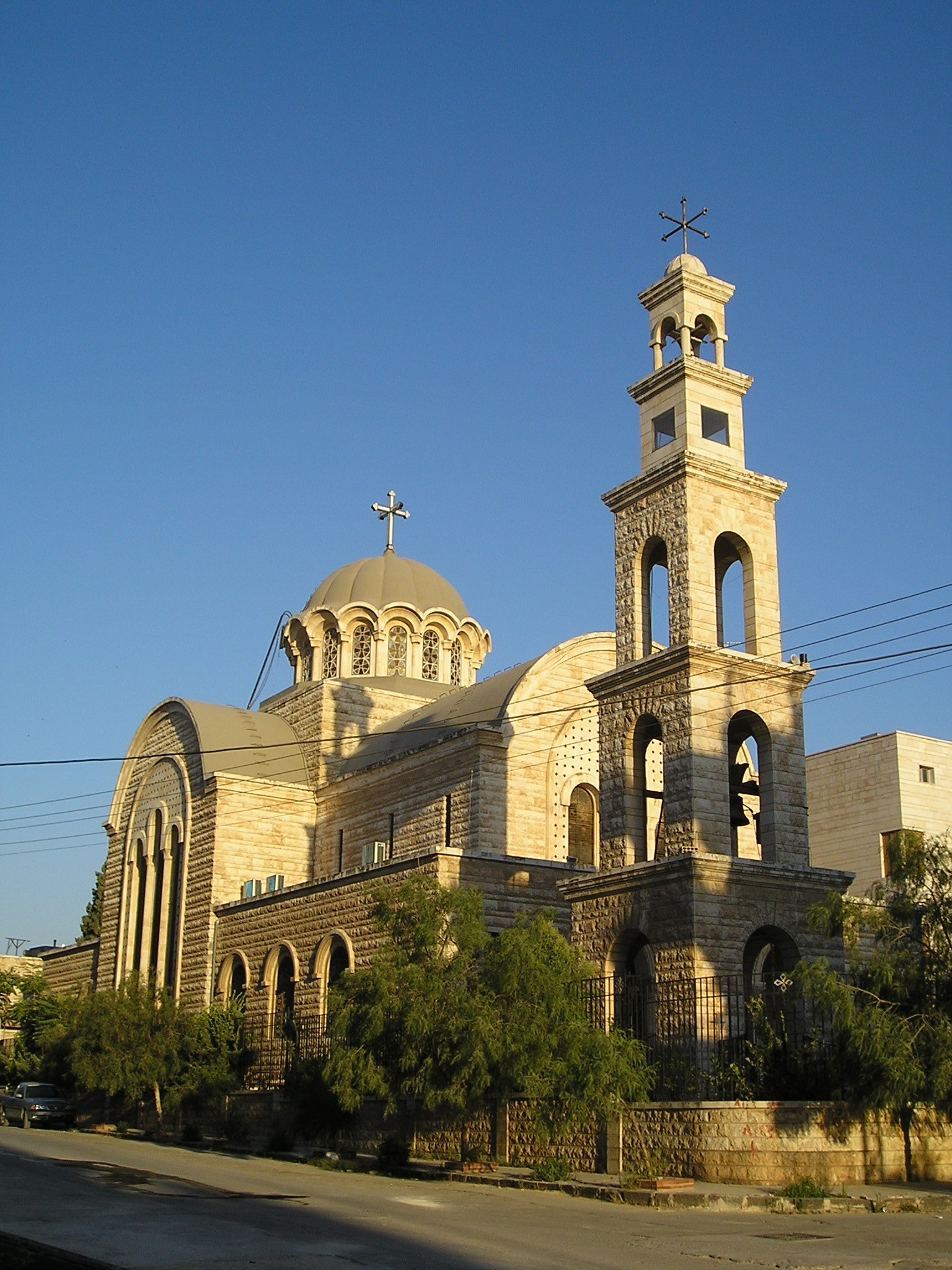
A Greek Orthodox church.

According to Josiah C. Russel, during the 12th century, Hama had a population of 6,750. James Reilly accounts the historical population as: 1812– 30,000 (Burckhardt) 1830– 20,000 (Robinson) 1839– 30–44,000 (Bowring) 1850– 30,000 (Porter) 1862– 10–12,000 (Guys) 1880– 27,656 (Parliamentary Papers) 1901– 60,000 (Parliamentary Papers) 1902–1907 80,000 (Trade Reports) 1906– 40,000 (al-Sabuni) 1909– 60,000 (Trade Reports) In 1932, while Hama was under the French Mandate, there were approximately 50,000 residents. In the 1960 census, there were 110,000 inhabitants. The population continued to rise, reaching 180,000 in 1978 and 273,000 in 1994. The infant mortality rate per 1,000 live births in the Hama Governorate was 99.4. A 2005 estimate had Hama's population at around 325,000 inhabitants.

Most of the residents are Sunni Muslims (including Arabs, Kurds and Turkmen), although some districts of the city are exclusively Christian. The Christian population mostly adheres to the Greek Orthodox Church. Hama is reputed to be the most conservative Sunni Muslim city in Syria going back to French Mandate times. An old saying reflects this characteristic: "In Damascus, it takes only three men to make a political demonstration, while in Hama it takes only three men to get the town to pray."

The city also contains a Palestinian refugee camp, known as Hama camp.

=== Ecclesiastical status ===
The Greek Orthodox Church has a prelacy in Hama under the Patriarch of Antioch. Hama is still a Roman Catholic titular see (referred to as "Hamath" or Amath"), suffragan of Apamea. It is as "Epiphania" that it is best known in ecclesiastical documents. Lequien mentions nine Greek bishops of Epiphania. The first of them, whom he calls Mauritius, is the Manikeios whose signature appears in the First Council of Nicaea. Currently, it has two Catholic archbishops, a Greek Melkite and a Syrian, the former residing at Labroud, the latter at Homs, reuniting the titles of Homs (Emesus) and Hamah.

Titular bishopric of the Roman Church

- Vartan Hunanian (28 Jan 1675 - 24 October 1681)
- Franz Anton von Harrach zu Rorau (21 Nov 1701 - 7 January 1702, bishop of Vienna)
- Giovanni Domenico Xiberras (1 Oct 1727 - 5 October 1751)
- Giovanni Battista Albrici Pellegrini (5 Oct 1751 - 21 July 1760, Bishop of Como)
- Tommaso Vespoli (22 Nov 1762 - 1768 )
- Johann Nepomuk Augustin von Hornstein zu Hohenstoffen (16 May 1768 - 16 December 1805)
- Francis Alphonsus Bourne (23 Mar 1896 - 1 May 1897)
- Pierre Feghali (23 Feb 1919 - 20 July 1944)
- Pietro Sfair (11 Mar 1953 - 11 March 1960)
- Volodymyr Malanczuk (22 Jul 1960 - 29 September 1990)

=== Neighbourhoods ===
- Kazo

== Hamath in the Bible ==
Hamath's few Biblical mentions state that it was the capital of a Canaanite kingdom (Genesis 10:18; 2 Kings 23:33; 25:21) whose king congratulated King David on his defeat of Hadadezer, king of Zobah (2 Samuel 8:9–11; 1 Chronicles 18:9–11). Yahweh specifies to Moses that Hamath will mark the northern border of the Canaanite territory which the Israelites are to occupy, (Numbers 34.1–9) and from which they are to "drive out the Canaanites, Amorites, Hittites, Perizzites, Hivites and Jebusites" with the assistance of an angel (Exodus 33.2). Solomon is said to have taken possession of Hamath and its territory and built store cities (1 Kings 4:21–24; 2 Chronicles 8:4). 1 Kings 8:65 names the "entrance of Hamath", or Lebo-Hamath, as the northern border of Israel at the time of the dedication of the first temple in Jerusalem. The area was subsequently lost to the Syrians, but Jeroboam II, king of Israel, is said to have "restored the territory of Israel from the entrance of Hamath to the Sea of the Arabah (the Dead Sea)".

Assyria's defeat of Hamath made a profound impression on Isaiah (Isaiah 10:9). The prophet Amos also named the town "Hamath the Great" (Amos 6:2).

== Main sights ==
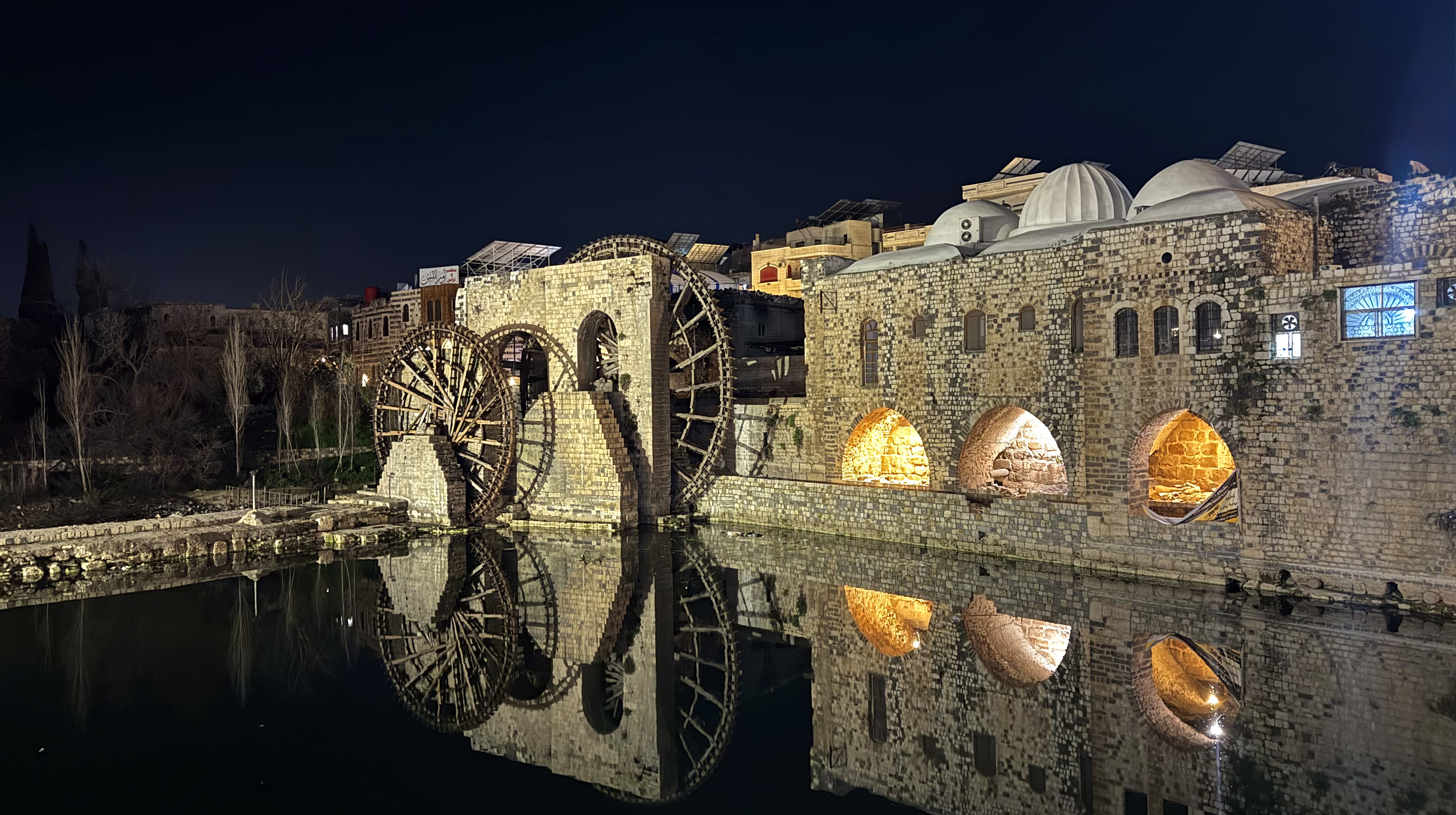
The Orontes River and Norias of Hama

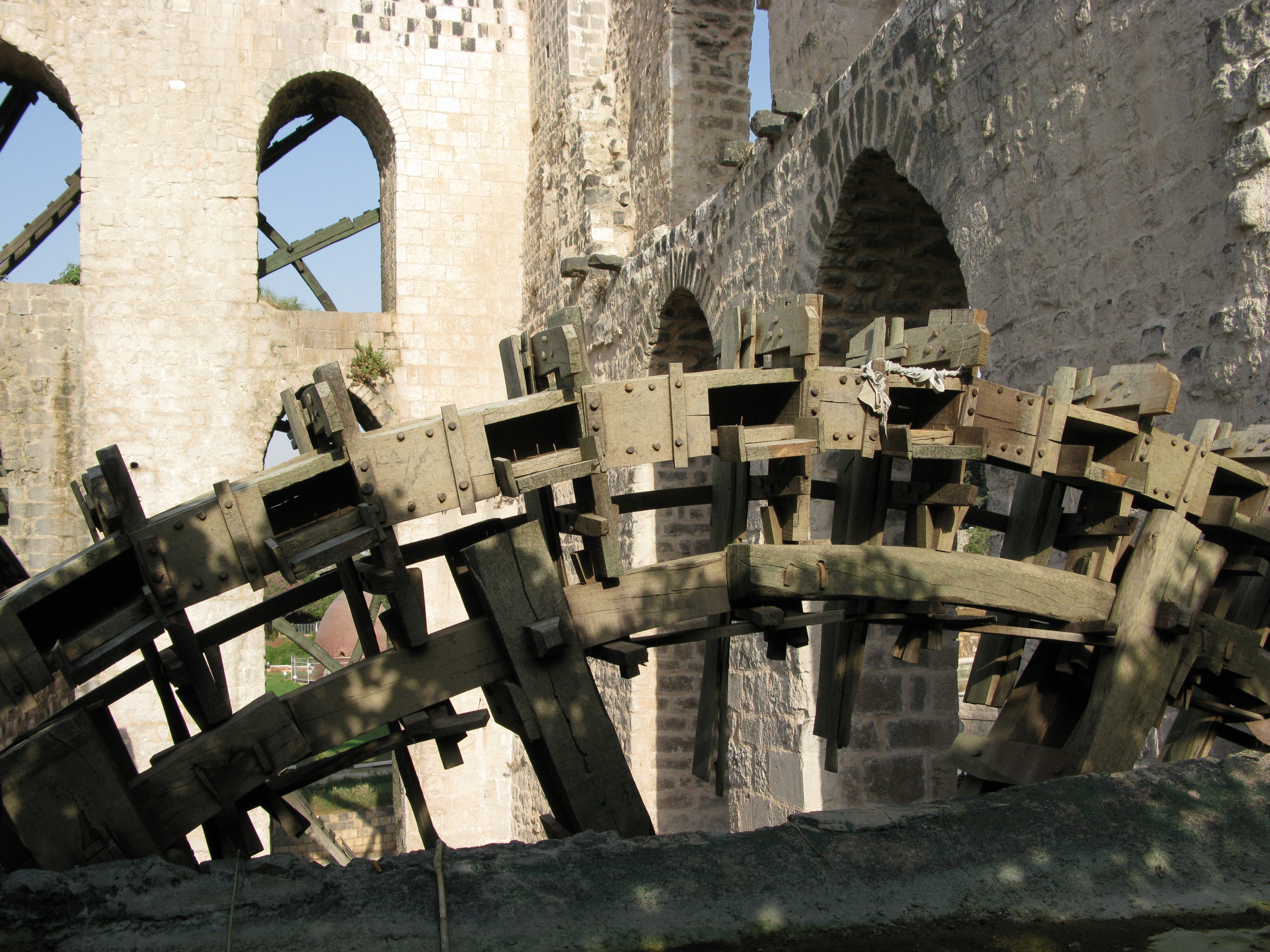
Close-up view of Noria

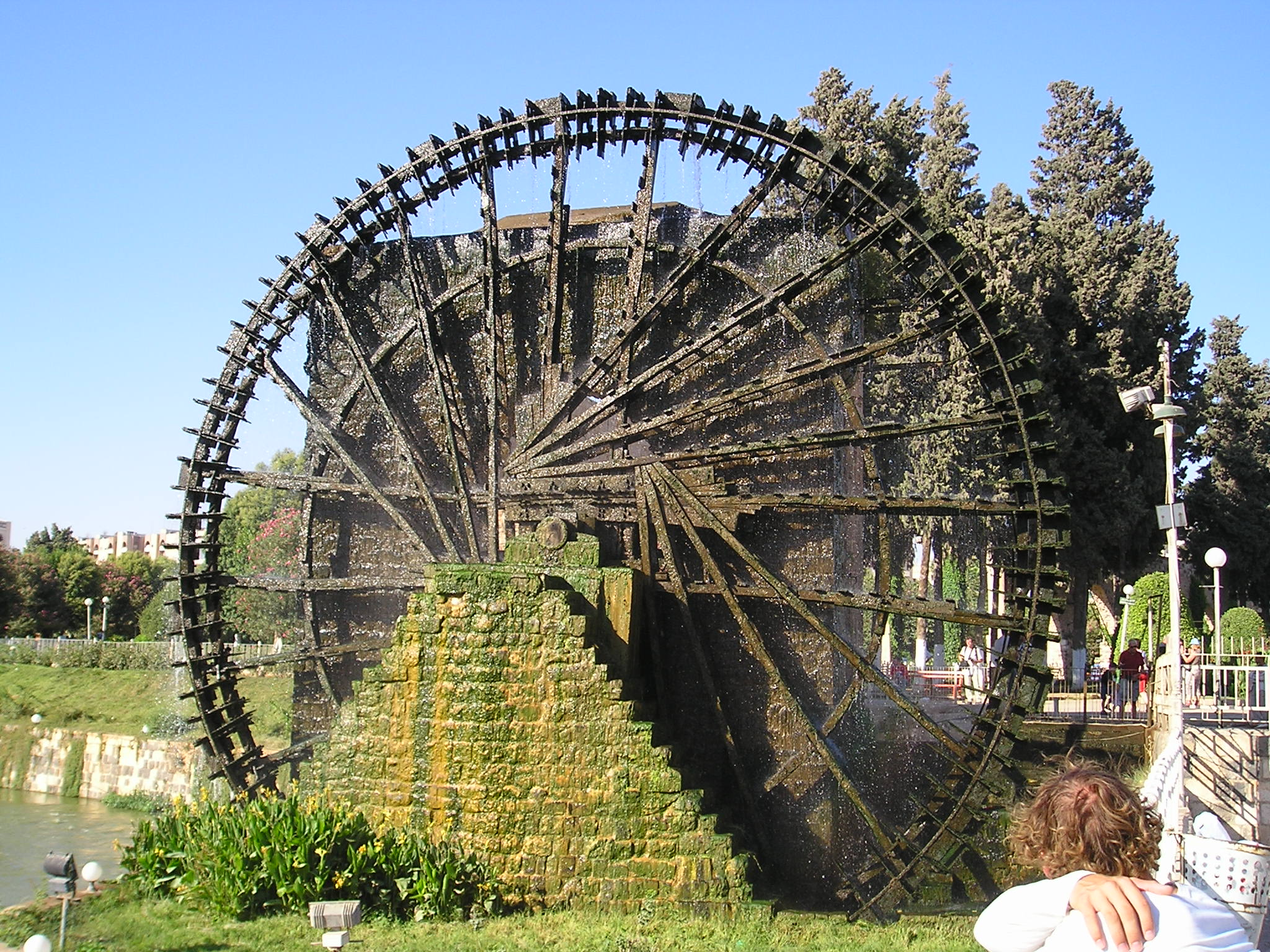
Norias of Hama

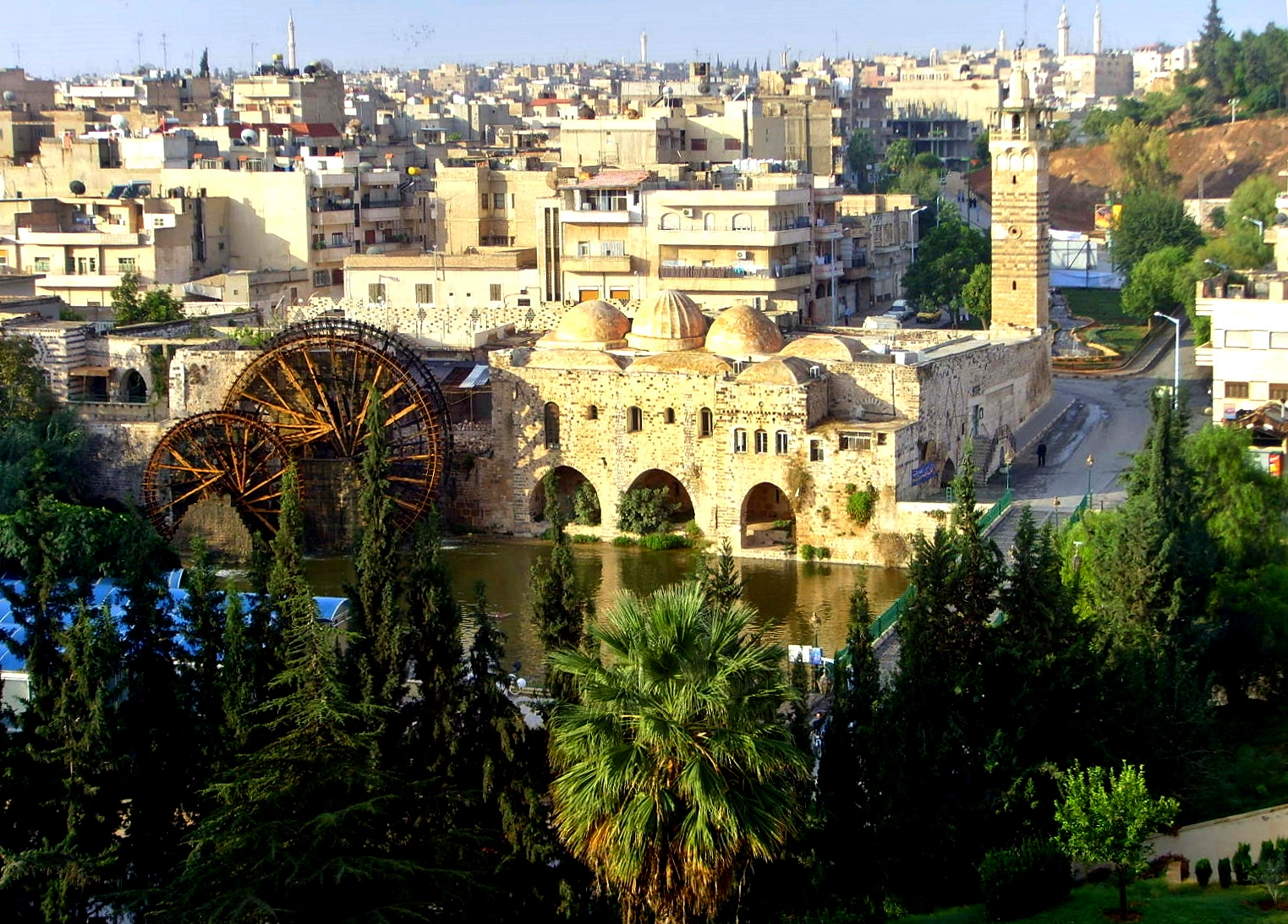
Noria of Hama

Hama's most famous attractions are the 17 Norias of Hama (Arabic: نواعير حماة), dating back to the Byzantine times. Fed by the Orontes river, they are up to 20 metres (66 ft) in diameter. The largest norias are the al-Mamunye (1453) and the al-Muhammediye (14th century). Originally they were used to direct water into aqueducts, which led into the town and the neighbouring agricultural areas.

Other sights include:

- Hama museum, housed in an 18th-century Ottoman governor's residence (Azem Palace), exhibiting remains of a Roman mosaic from Maryamin (4th century AD)
- Hama Apamea, Apamea was an important ancient city located on the Orontes River in western Syria, near modern-day Hama. It was founded around 300 BC by Seleucus I Nicator, one of Alexander the Great’s generals and founder of the Seleucid Empire. The city was named after Seleucus’s wife, Apama. it flourished as a prosperous city known for its grand colonnaded street—one of the longest in the Roman world—stretching nearly 2 kilometers.
- al-Nuri mosque, renovated in 1163 by Nur ad-Din after the earthquake of 1157.
- Mamluk al-Izzi mosque (15th century)
- Mosque and Mausoleum of Abu al-Fida, an Ayyubid historian who was also governor of the city.
- al-Hasanain mosque, also rebuilt by Nur ad-Din after the earthquake
- Great Mosque of Hama, rebuilt after 1982 bombardment, incorporating elements from the ancient and Christian structures upon which it was founded.

== Notable people ==
- Adib Shishakli, President of Syria briefly in 1951 and later from 1953 to 1954.
- Abo Al-fidaa, Kurdish historian, geographer and Ayyubid prince

== See also ==
Sound of a noria
Sound of a noria

- Outline of Syria
- Cities of the ancient Near East
- Hama massacre
- Short chronology timeline
- Shayzar Castle

== Bibliography ==
- This article incorporates text from a publication now in the public domain: Herbermann, Charles, ed. (1913). "Hamatha". Catholic Encyclopedia. New York: Robert Appleton Company. CATHOLIC ENCYCLOPEDIA: Hamatha Archived 4 April 2023 at the Wayback Machine
- Ambraseys, Nicholas N. (2004). "The 12th Century Seismic Paroxysm in the Middle East: A Historical Perspective" (PDF). Annals of Geophysics. 47 (2–3): 733–758.
- Beattie, Andrew (1996). "Hama". In Ring, Trudy; Berney, K.A.; Salkin, Robert M.; La Boda, Sharon; Watson, Noelle; Schellinger, Paul (eds.). International Dictionary of Historic Places: Middle East and Africa. Routledge. pp. 315–318. ISBN 1-884964-03-6.
- Bruce, John Collingwood (1867). The Roman Wall: a historical, topographical, and descriptive account of the barrier of the lower isthmus, extending from the Tyne to the Solway, etc. With plates and maps. Longmans & Company..
- Dandamayev, Muhammad A. (1990). "Cambyses II". Encyclopaedia Iranica, Vol. IV, Fasc. 7. pp. 726–729. Archived from the original on 17 November 2017.
- Grainger, John D. (2016). Syria: An Outline History. Pen and Sword. ISBN 9781473860834.
- Herzog, Johann Jakob; Schaff, Phillip (1911). The New Schaff-Herzog Encyclopedia of Religious Knowledge: Embracing Biblical, Historical, Doctrinal, and Practical Theology and Biblical, Theological, and Ecclesiastical Biography from the Earliest Times to the Present Day. Funk and Wagnalls Company.
- Kennedy, Hugh (2004) [1986]. The Prophet and the Age of the Caliphates: The Islamic Near East from the 6th to the 11th Century (Second ed.). Harlow: Longman. ISBN 978-0-582-40525-7.
- Reilly, James (2002). A Small Town in Syria: Ottoman Hama in the Eighteenth and Nineteenth centuries. P. Lang. ISBN 9783906766904.
- Shatzmiller, Maya (1994). Labour in the Medieval Islamic World. Brill. ISBN 9789004098961.
- Sourdel, D. (1971). "Ḥamāt". In Lewis, B.; Ménage, V. L.; Pellat, Ch. & Schacht, J. (eds.). The Encyclopaedia of Islam, Second Edition. Volume III: H–Iram. Leiden: E. J. Brill. pp. 119–121. OCLC 495469525.
- le Strange, Guy (1890). Palestine Under the Moslems: A Description of Syria and the Holy Land from A.D. 650 to 1500. Committee of the Palestine Exploration Fund.
- Whitaker, J. L. (2007). "Hamah". In Dumper, Michael R.T.; Stanley, Bruce E. (eds.). Cities of the Middle East and North Africa. Santa Barbara: ABC-CLIO. pp. 162–164. ISBN 978-1-57607-919-5.
- Winckler, Onn (1998). Demographic Developments and Population Policies in Ba'athist Syria. Sussex Academic Press. ISBN 1-902210-16-6.
