= Kaso River =

The Kaso River or Cikaso River may refer to:

- Kaso River, Borneo
- Kaso River (Sukabumi), Java. Indonesia.
- Kaso River (Garut), Java, Indonesia.

== See also ==
- Kaso (disambiguation)
