= Great Mosque of Hama =

Mosque in Hama, Syria

- جَامِعُ حَمَاةَ الْكَبِيرُ
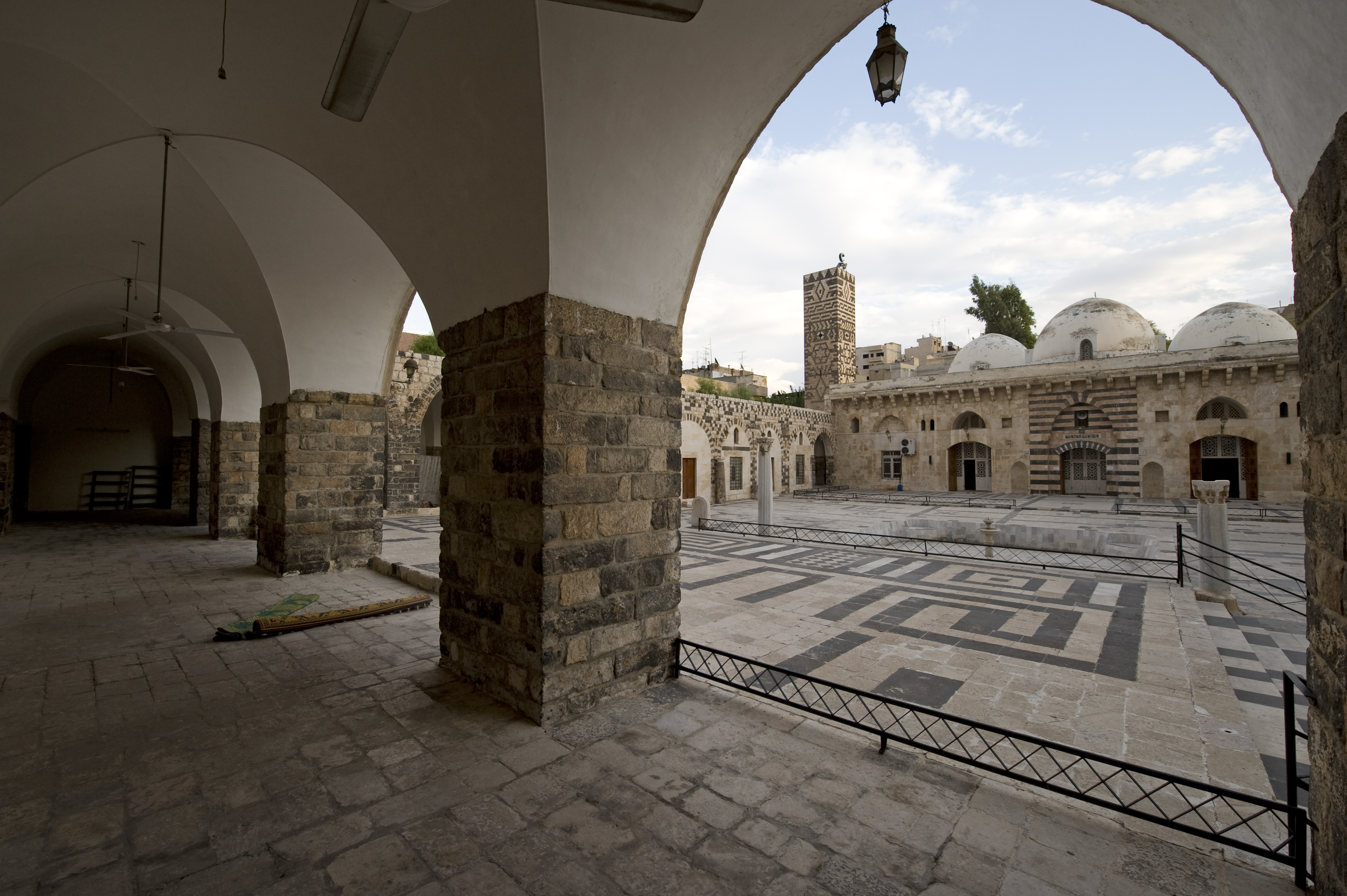
- The rebuilt mosque in 2008

- Location of the mosque in Syria

Religion
- Affiliation: Sunni Islam
- Ecclesiastical or organizational status: Mosque (8th century–1982) (since 2001– )
- Status: Active

Location
- Location: Hama
- Country: Syria
- Interactive map of Great Mosque of Hama
- Coordinates: 35°8′3″N 36°44′43″E

Architecture
- Type: Islamic architecture
- Style: Umayyad
- Completed: 8th century CE (first mosque); 2001 (reconstruction)
- Destroyed: 1982 (during the Hama massacre)

Specifications
- Dome: 5
- Minaret: 2

The Great Mosque of Hama (Arabic: جَامِع حَمَاة ٱلْكَبِير, romanized: Jāmiʿ Ḥamāt al-Kabīr), is a mosque in Hama, Syria. It is located approximately 400 metres (1,300 ft) west of the citadel. Built in the 8th century CE, it was largely destroyed in the 1982 Hama massacre and subsequently rebuilt.

== History ==
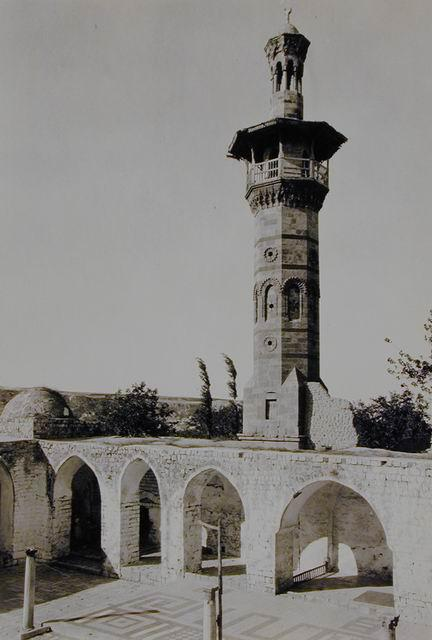
View of the mosque courtyard and its Mamluk minaret (added in 1427), in a 1919 photo by Creswell

The site of the building was originally a Roman temple dating to the 3rd century CE. It was converted into a church during the Byzantine Empire era, probably in the 6th century CE. It was converted into a mosque in the early Islamic era, although the details and dating of this conversion have been the subject of debate by scholars. Prior to its later destruction, the building contained many reused elements dating from the Roman or Christian Byzantine eras. One 14th-century Muslim historian, Abu al-Fida', claimed that the church was converted into a mosque right after the conquest of the city in 636–7 CE, during the time of Caliph Umar, but modern scholars have expressed skepticism about this dating, as it appears to be implausibly early. Some, such as Bernard O'Kane, suggested the conversion took place in the Umayyad period (late 7th or early 8th century), while Maria Guidetti has suggested it could be in the late 8th century during the early Abbasid period. There has also been debate over the dating of physical elements of the mosque: Jean Sauvaget argued that the riwaqs (arcades) in its courtyard and the east and west walls of the prayer hall could be dated to the Umayyad period, whereas K. A. C. Creswell cast doubt on this dating.

The Great Mosque has two minarets; one is a square-based tower adjacent to the prayer hall and from an inscription on its surface, dates from 1124 CE, although some argue that its base is of Umayyad origin, while others say it was constructed in 1153 CE. The second minaret is octagonal in shape and was built by the Mamluks in 1427 CE. At the side of the main northern courtyard is a smaller square courtyard containing the tombs of two 13th-century Ayyubid kings.

The mosque was almost completely destroyed by the Syrian government, along with much of the historic old town, during the civil conflict in Hama in 1982. It was subsequently rebuilt by the Antiquities Department of the Syrian government. By 2001, the reconstruction was complete. The reconstruction followed the design of the historic building, but not all the details of the rebuilt mosque are true to the original.

== Gallery ==
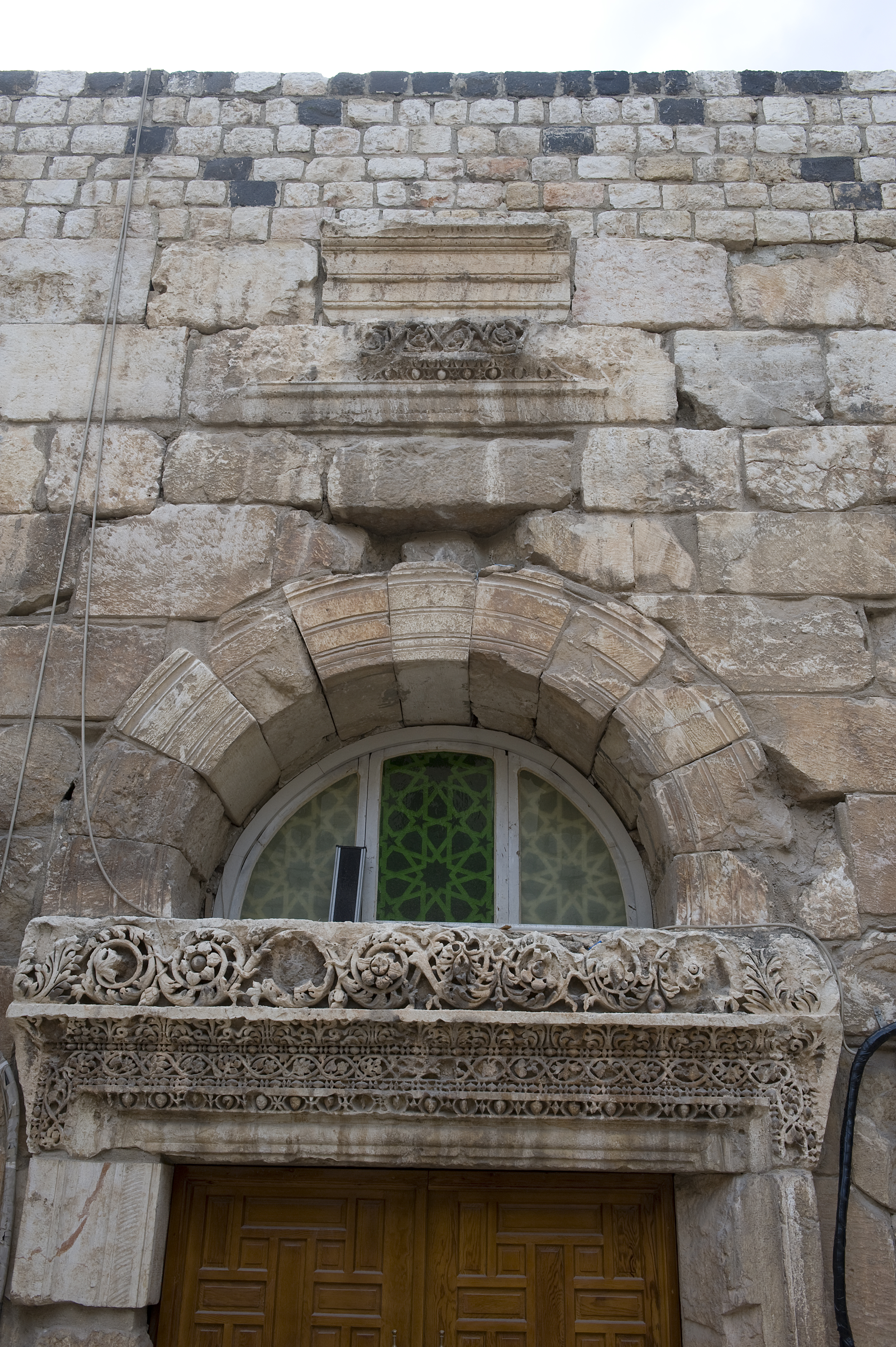
Eastern entrance of the mosque with incorporated spolia

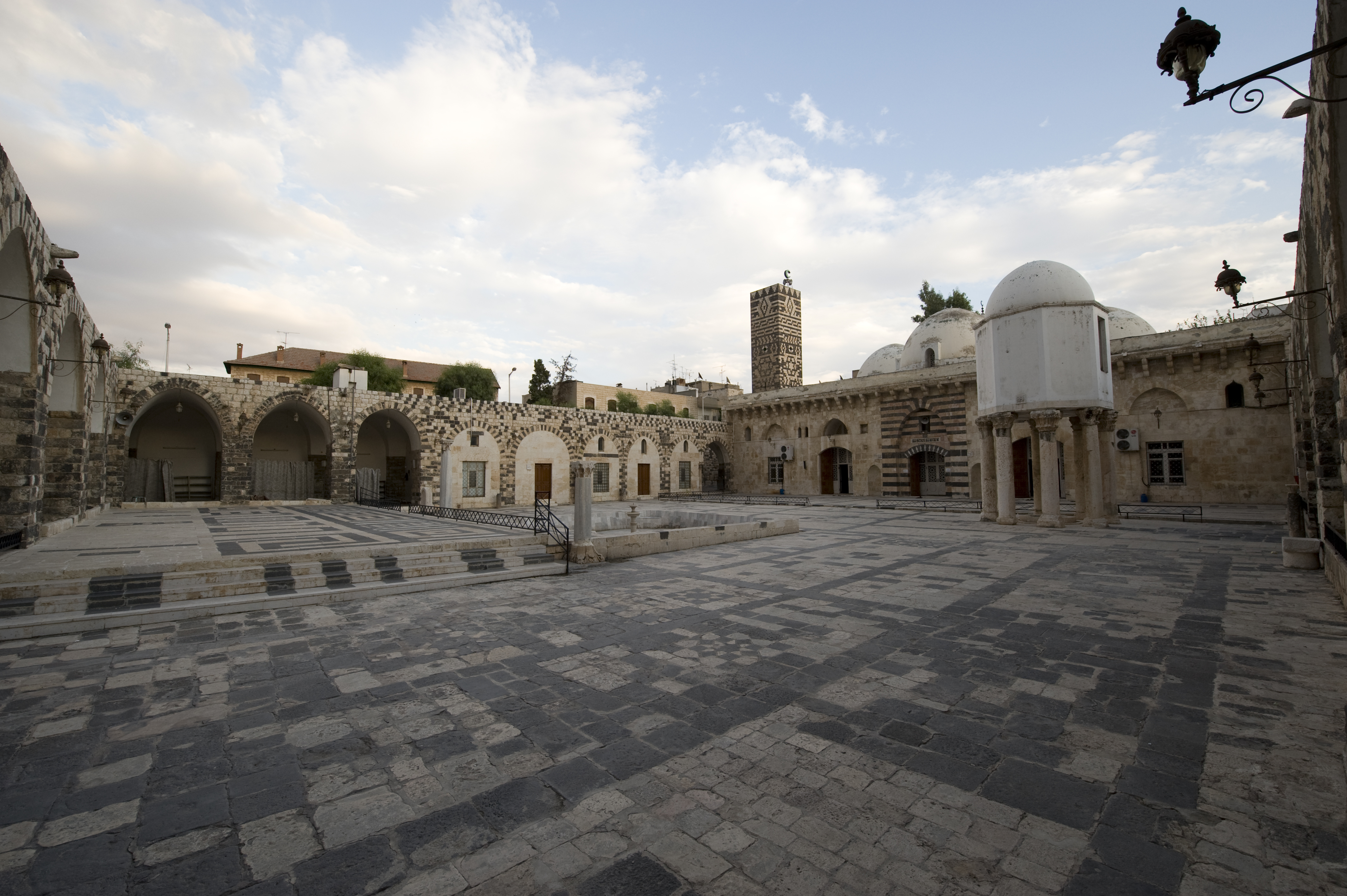
Courtyard of the mosque, with the domed treasury (bayt al-mal) on the right

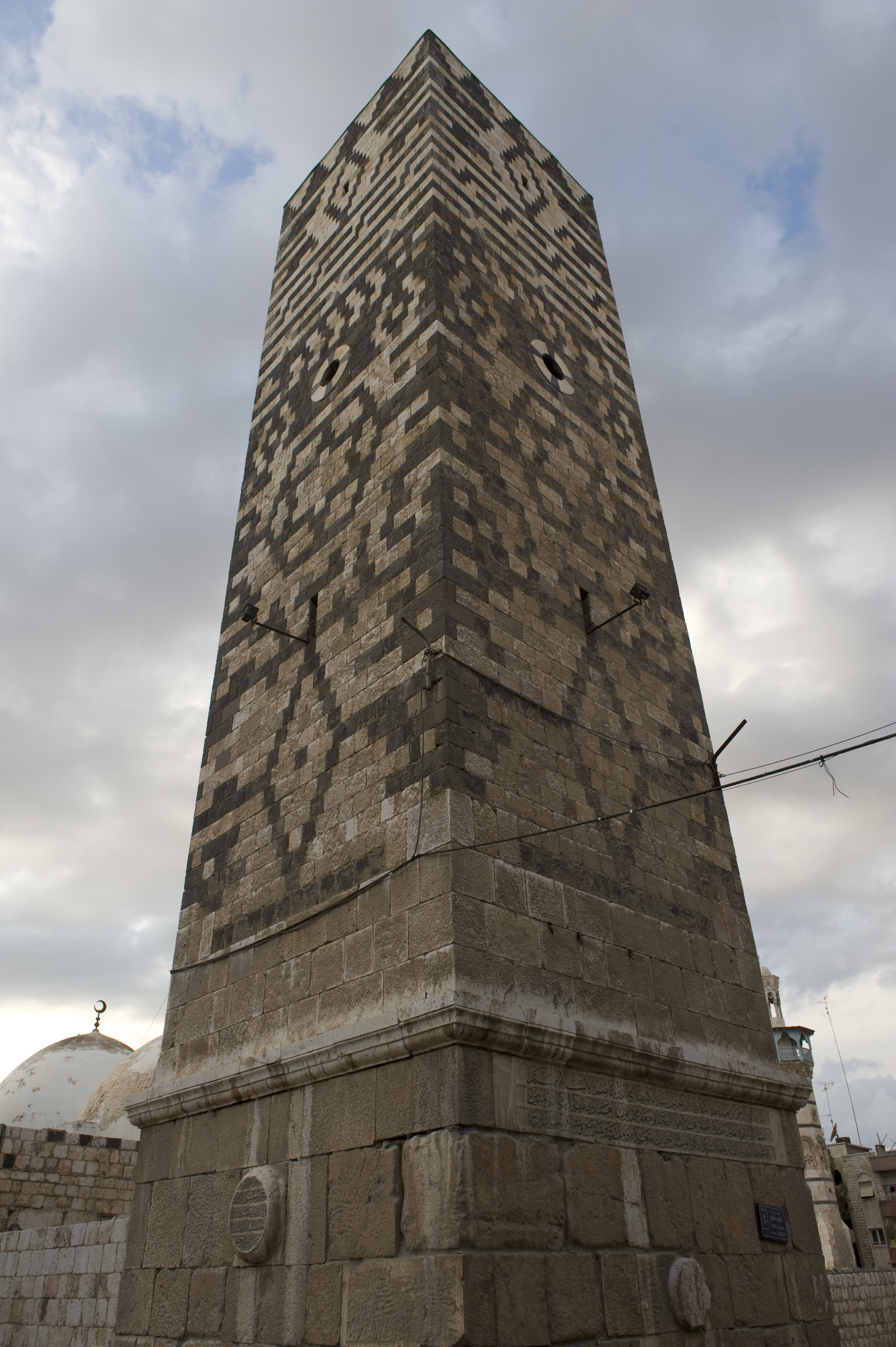
The first minaret, at the southeast corner of the mosque

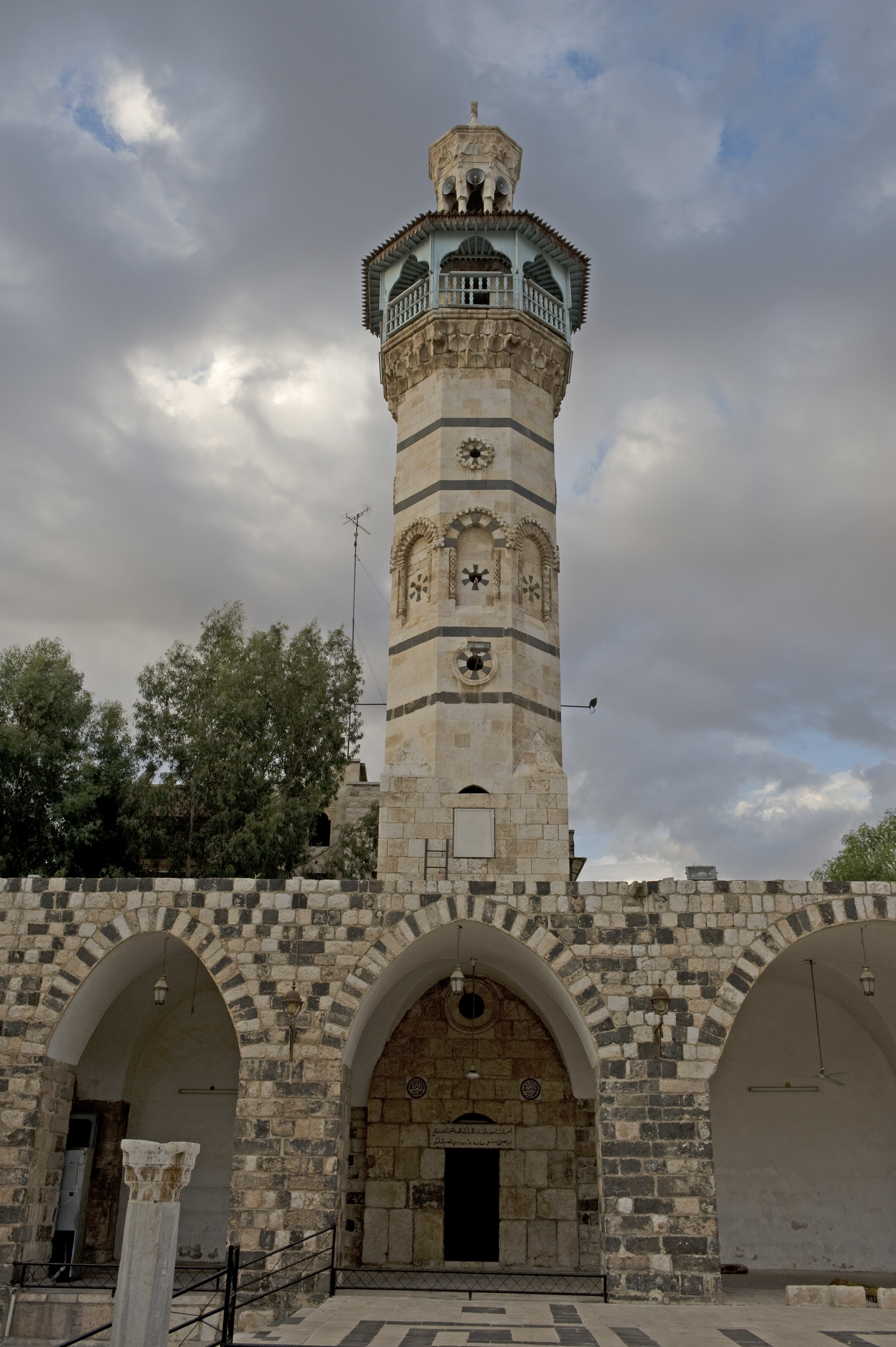
The Mamluk minaret, on the north side of the mosque

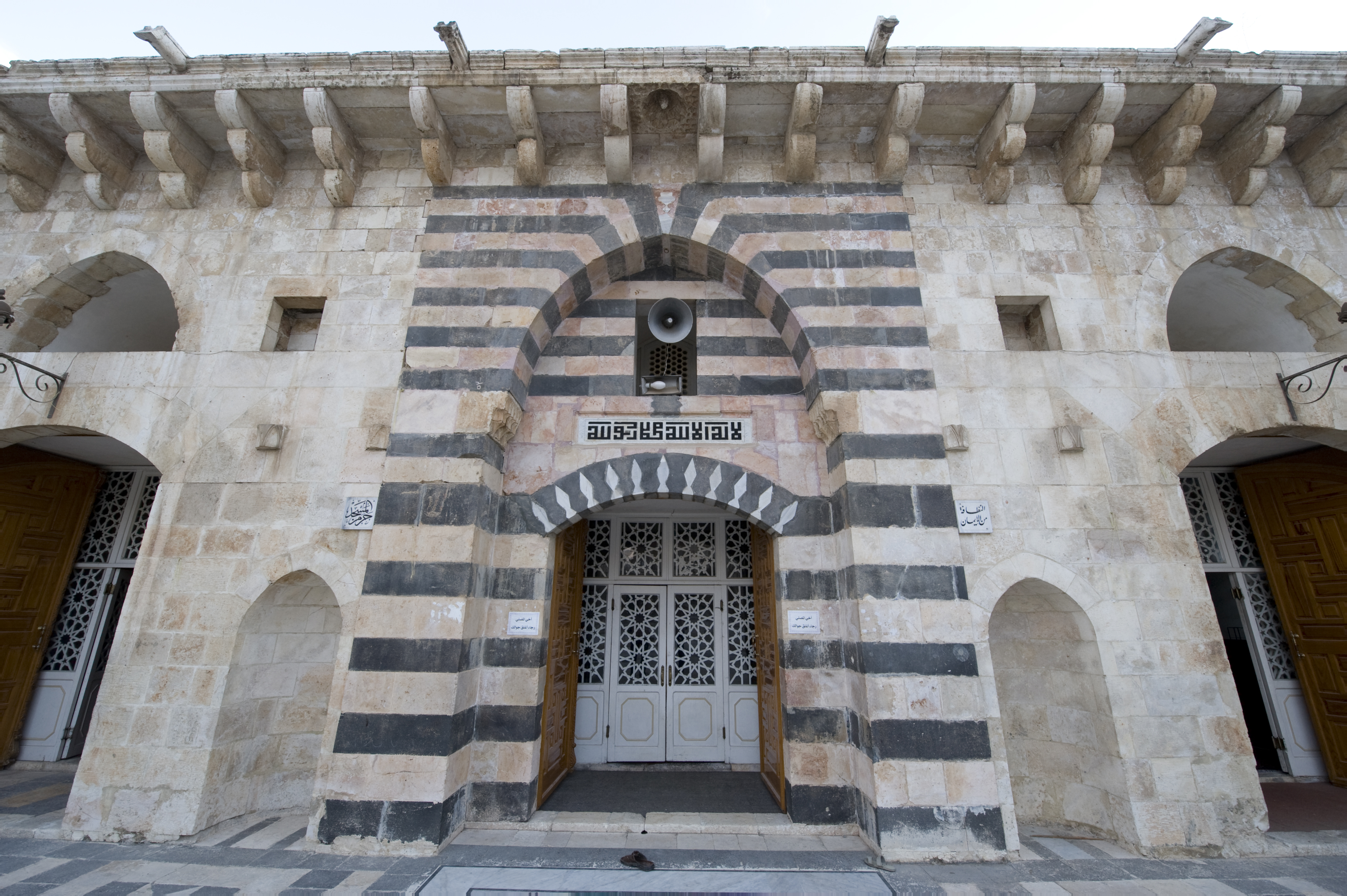
Central entrance from the courtyard into the prayer hall

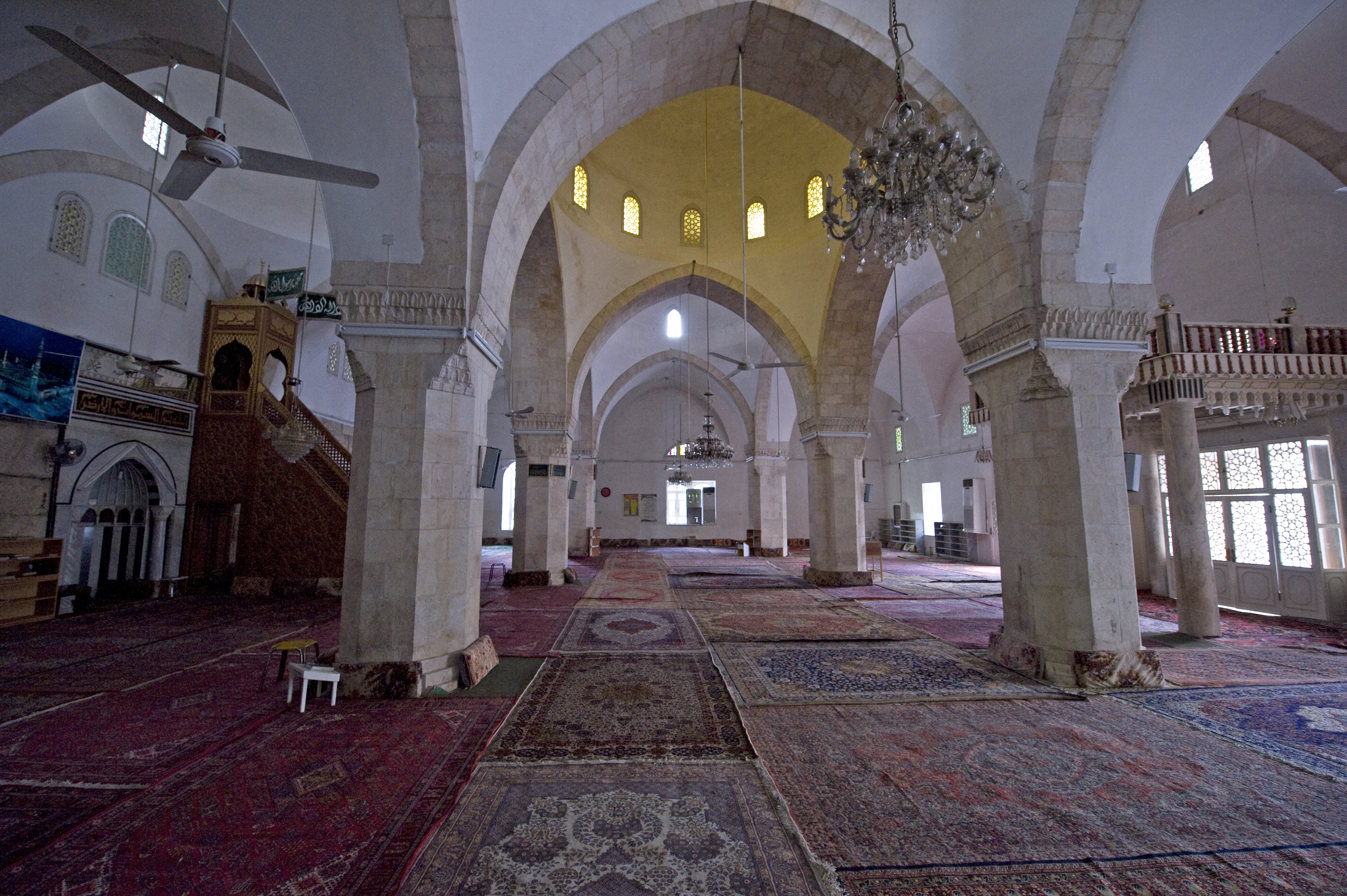
Inside the prayer hall, with mihrab and minbar on the left

== See also ==
- Islam in Syria
- List of mosques in Syria
