= Kazo, Hama =

Kazo كازو
- Neighbourhood
- Kazo, Hama, Syria
- Coordinates: 35°08′55.92″N 36°43′26.50″E
- Country: Syria
- Governorate: Hama
- District: Hama
- City: Hama

Population (2004)
  - Total: 7,937
- Time zone: +2

Kazo (Arabic: كازو), also spelled Kazu, Kâzo, Kazou, Kāzū, is a neighbourhood located in Hama, Syria.

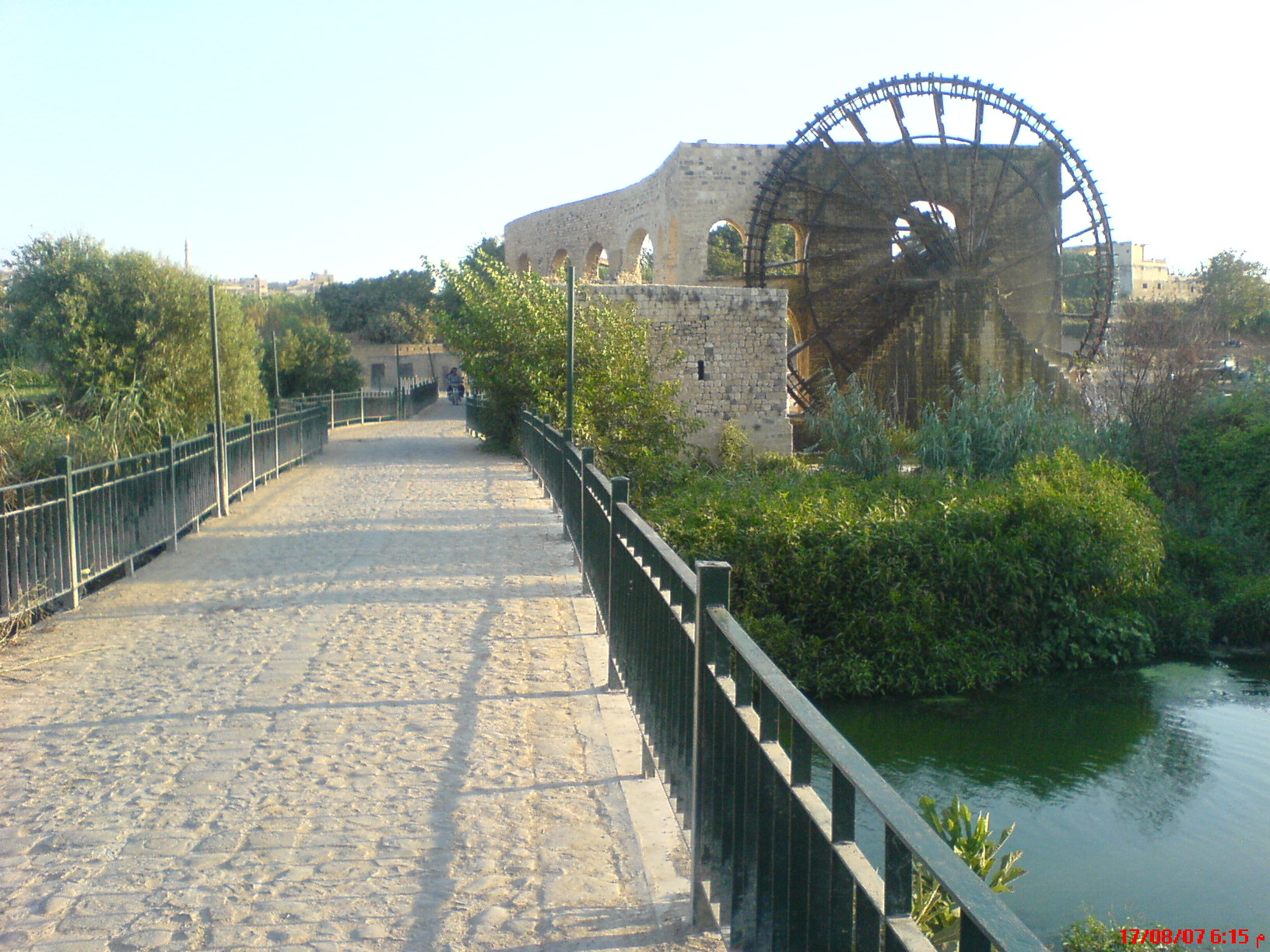
The old bridge and Noria on the Orontes River in Kazo
