= Kašov =

Village and municipality in Slovakia

Kašov Kásó
- Municipality
- Flag

- Location of Kašov in the Košice Region Location of Kašov in Slovakia
- Coordinates: 48.48°N 21.75°E
- Country: Slovakia
- Region: Košice Region
- District: Trebišov District
- First mentioned: 1298

Area
  - Total: 8.88 km^{2} (3.43 sq mi)
- Elevation: 144 m (472 ft)

Population (2025)
  - Total: 293
- Time zone: UTC+1 (CET)
  - Summer (DST): UTC+2 (CEST)
- Postal code: 760 2
- Area code: +421 56
- Vehicle registration plate (until 2022): TV
- Website: obeckasov.sk

Kašov (Hungarian: Kásó) is a village and municipality in the Trebišov District in the Košice Region of south-eastern Slovakia.

== History ==
In historical records the village was first mentioned in 1298.

== Geography ==
The municipality lies at an altitude of 144 metres (472 ft) and covers an area of 8.88 km^{2} (3.43 sq mi) (2025).

== Population ==
Population statistic (10 years)
Year	1995	2005	2015	2025
Count	357	275	284	293
Difference		−22.96%	+3.27%	+3.16%

Population statistic
Year	2024	2025
Count	294	293
Difference		−0.34%

It has a population of 293 people (31 December 2025).

=== Ethnicity ===
Census 2021 (1+ %)
Ethnicity	Number	Fraction
Slovak	287	96.95%
Not found out	6	2.02%
Romani	4	1.35%
Total	296	

In year 2021 was 296 people by ethnicity 287 as Slovak, 6 as Not found out, 4 as Romani, 2 as Rusyn, 2 as Other, 2 as English, 1 as Czech and 1 as Hungarian.

Note on population: The difference values of population numbers in the table "Population statistic" and in the sections "Ethnicity" & "Religion" is caused by the use of various statistical methods.

=== Religion ===
Census 2021 (1+ %)
Religion	Number	Fraction
Roman Catholic Church	142	47.97%
Eastern Orthodox Church	53	17.91%
Greek Catholic Church	42	14.19%
None	39	13.18%
Apostolic Church	6	2.03%
Not found out	5	1.69%
Calvinist Church	4	1.35%
Total	296	

In year 2021 was 296 people by religion 142 from Roman Catholic Church, 53 from Eastern Orthodox Church, 42 from Greek Catholic Church, 39 from None, 6 from Apostolic Church, 5 from Not found out, 4 from Calvinist Church, 2 from Islam, 2 from Evangelical Church and 1 from Jehovah's Witnesses.

== Facilities ==
The village has a public library and a football pitch.

== Genealogical resources ==
The records for genealogical research are available at the state archive "Statny Archiv in Kosice, Slovakia"

- Roman Catholic church records (births/marriages/deaths): 1772-1895 (parish B)
- Greek Catholic church records (births/marriages/deaths): 1773-1926 (parish B)
- Reformated church records (births/marriages/deaths): 1816-1895 (parish B)

== See also ==
- List of municipalities and towns in Slovakia
