= Garfield water wheel =

Historical water wheel in Victoria, Australia

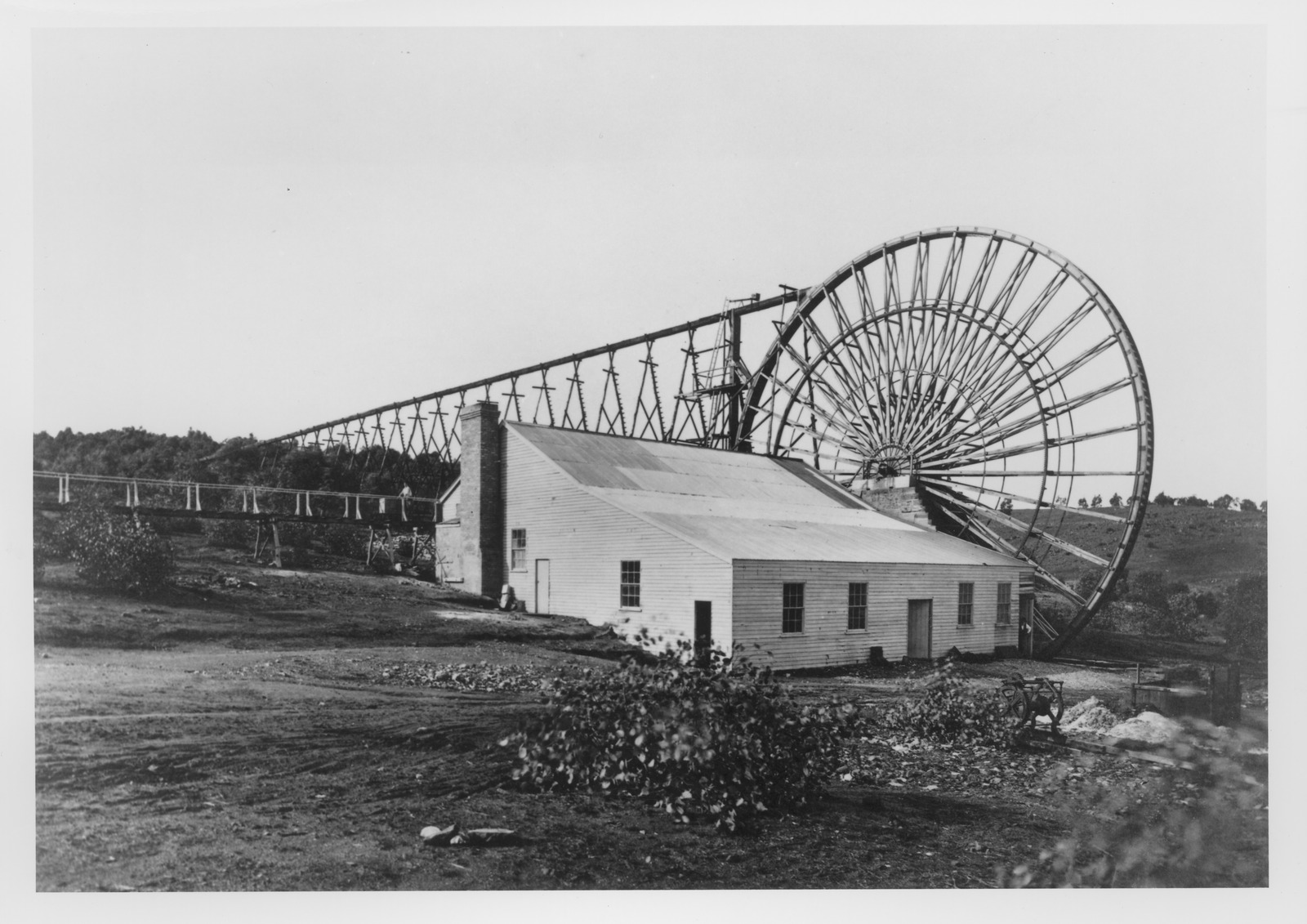
- Garfield water wheel and stamper battery (Source: State Library of Victoria)

- Location in Victoria
- Interactive map of Garfield water wheel
- 37°04′20″S 144°15′34″E
- Location: Chewton, in the North Central region of Victoria, Australia

History
- Built: 1887
- Built for: Coliban Water Supply Scheme
- Demolished: c. 1904

Victorian Heritage Register
- Official name: Garfield Waterwheel Quartz Gold Mining Site
- Type: Registered place
- Designated: 20 August 1982
- Reference no.: H1356
- Category: Mining and Mineral Processing

The Garfield water wheel, sometimes referred to as the Forest Creek Mine water wheel, was a large water wheel used to power a stamper battery at a gold mine near Chewton, in the North Central region of Victoria, Australia. Constructed in 1887, the water wheel was used until 1903 and then was dismantled in 1904.

Some remnants at its location were added to the Victorian Heritage Register on 20 August 1982.

== History ==
There was insufficient water in local streams to power a water wheel. The Garfield mine and others in the area originally relied upon steam engines to power their stamper mills. It was not until the construction of the Coliban System of Waterworks (now Coliban Water) that the gold mining areas had a reliable source of water, diverted from the Coliban River, for both domestic and mining purposes. Eventually, at least seven water wheels were built and operated in the Castlemaine-Chewton area.

Constructed in 1887, the Garfield water wheel was used until 1903 then was dismantled in 1904.

== Technology ==
Water flow to the Garfield wheel was via a 240-metre-long (786 ft) elevated flume—38 centimetres (15 in) wide by 25 centimetres (10 in) deep and mounted on a timber trestle structure—which connected to a branch race of the water supply near the top of an adjacent hill. The flow to the wheel itself was controlled by an arrangement of levers. The tail water from the Garfield wheel powered another water wheel – 12 metres (40 ft) in diameter – belonging to the Manchester mine, approximately 400 metres (1,300 ft) away.

The wheel was stopped, when required, by diverting the water, from the overhead flume directly to the tail race, via a vertical bypass chute that allowed the downstream water wheel to continue working. The wheel was started, by feeding water so as to fill buckets part way up the wheel; once motion was achieved, the water flow was applied to the upper buckets and the wheel could then be run at up to its full power.

The backshot water wheel was 22 metres (72 ft) in diameter, and 64 centimetres (2 ft 1 in) wide. The spokes of the wheel were made of wood, and its structure was strengthened by circular iron bands. It carried 220 galvanised iron buckets of 23 litres (5 imp gal) capacity each. At a flow rate of approximately 6,000 litres (1,300 imp gal)s per minute, the huge waterwheel was capable of 20 kW (27 hp). The wheel rotated once every 45 to 55 seconds, corresponding to 1.33 to 1.09 rpm. Power was transferred via an iron gear wheel, mounted on the wheel at about two-thirds of the distance between its centre and rim. That arrangement reduced the torque applied to the axle of the water wheel, allowing the wheel to be of lighter construction than if power was transferred via its axle. Cogs on the gear wheel engaged with a pinion, which in turn drove a power transfer shaft, at a far higher rotational speed than that of the water wheel. The transfer shaft powered a 15-head stamper battery—probably later extended to 25 heads—via an arrangement of pulleys and flat belts. The battery ran at 78 to 86 falls per minute; there being typically two cam arms per stamper head, the shaft of the battery probably ran at 39 to 43 rpm.

== Remnants ==
The stonework supports of the water wheel and the water races remain at the site, which is now part of the Castlemaine Diggings National Heritage Park. The Garfield ruins are the best preserved of at least seven water wheels that once operated in the Castlemaine-Chewton area and powered stamper batteries.
