= Hydrostatic head =

Hydropower terminology

As shown in this drawing, the hydrostatic head is the vertical distance between the water level in the reservoir and the turbine that is turned by the flowing water.

When generating hydropower, the head is the distance that a given water source has to fall before the point where power is generated. Ultimately the force responsible for hydropower is gravity, so a hydroelectricity plant with a tall/high head can produce more power than a similar plant with a short/low head. In short, for a given water flow, a larger head will be converted into greater kinetic energy. That energy is then harnessed by a water wheel or water turbine to create usable hydropower.

== Fabrics ==
Hydrostatic head is also used as a measure of the waterproofing of a fabric, commonly in clothing and equipment used for outdoor recreation. It is measured as a length (typically millimetres), representing the maximum height of a vertical column of water that could be placed on top of the fabric before water started seeping through the weave. Thus a fabric with a hydrostatic head rating of 5000 mm could hold back a column of water five metres high, but no more.

== See also ==
- Hydraulic head for a more technical description of the physical principle of hydraulics
- Tent and waterproofing, as hydrostatic head is used as a measurement of waterproofness
