= Castlemaine Diggings National Heritage Park =

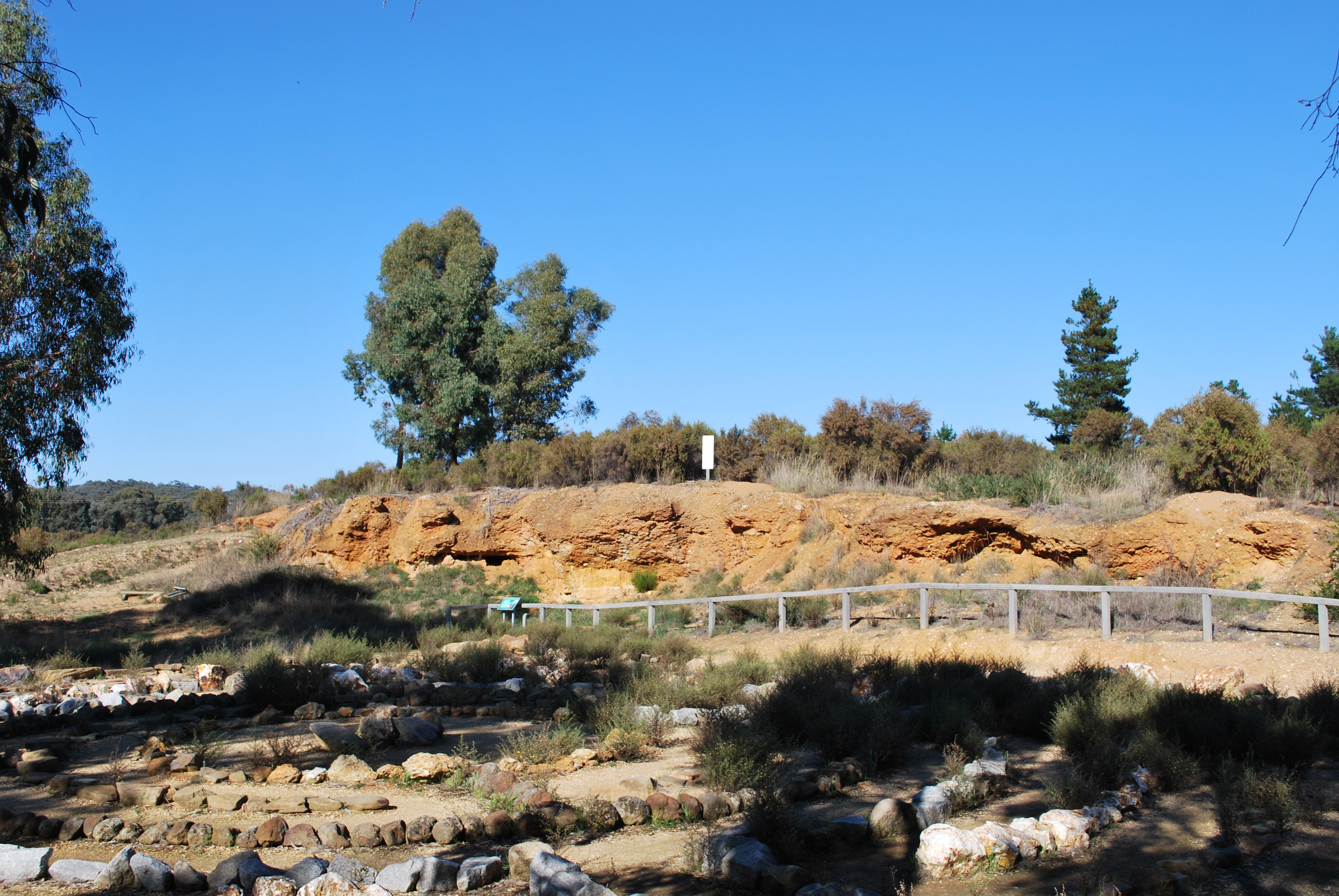
- Castlemaine Diggings in April 2011

- Location within Victoria
- Location: Victoria
- Nearest city: Castlemaine
- Coordinates: 37.1915°S 144.2165°E
- Area: 75.5 km^{2} (29.2 sq mi)
- Established: 2002
- Governing body: Parks Victoria
- Website: www.parks.vic.gov.au/places-to-see/parks/castlemaine-diggings-national-heritage-park

The Castlemaine Diggings National Heritage Park is near the town of Castlemaine, Victoria, Australia. The park protects a nationally significant historic cultural landscape of heritage value and relics of the Victorian gold rush.

The Castlemaine Diggings National Heritage Park was added to the Victorian Heritage Register in December 2003. It is the largest non-indigenous protected cultural landscape in Australia. In January 2005 the park was added to the Australian National Heritage List recognizing its outstanding heritage value and importance in the course of Australia’s migration history.

== See also ==
- Garfield water wheel
