= South Norfolk District Council elections =

Local government elections in Norfolk, England

South Norfolk District Council in Norfolk, England is elected once every four years. Since the last boundary changes in 2007, 46 councillors have been elected from 36 wards.

== Summary ==
The below table outlines the composition of South Norfolk Council from 1973 to 2023.

Year	Conservative	Liberal Democrats (Note: Includes totals for the predecessors of the Liberal Democrats, the Liberal Party and SDP (both of which participated in the Alliance).)	Labour	Green	Independents & Others	Council control after election
Local government reorganisation; council established (47 seats)
1973	6	1	7	–	33	Independent
1976	23	2	0	0	22	No overall control
New ward boundaries (55 seats)
1979	31	2	0	0	22	Conservative
New ward boundaries (47 seats)
1983	34	5	1	0	7	Conservative
1987	23	16	0	0	8	No overall control
1991	22	21	0	0	4	No overall control
1995	12	30	3	0	2	Liberal Democrats
1999	16	27	2	0	2	Liberal Democrats
New ward boundaries (46 seats)
2003	18	28	0	0	0	Liberal Democrats
2007	39	7	0	0	0	Conservative
2011	38	8	0	0	0	Conservative
2015	40	6	0	0	0	Conservative
2019	35	10	1	0	0	Conservative
2023	25	11	9	0	2	Conservative

== Council elections ==
- 1973 South Norfolk District Council election
- 1976 South Norfolk District Council election
- 1979 South Norfolk District Council election (New ward boundaries)
- 1983 South Norfolk District Council election
- 1987 South Norfolk District Council election
- 1991 South Norfolk District Council election
- 1995 South Norfolk District Council election
- 1999 South Norfolk District Council election
- 2003 South Norfolk District Council election (New ward boundaries reduced the number of seats by 1)
- 2007 South Norfolk District Council election (Some new ward boundaries)
- 2011 South Norfolk District Council election
- 2015 South Norfolk District Council election
- 2019 South Norfolk District Council election
- 2023 South Norfolk District Council election

== District result maps ==
1983 results map

1987 results map

1991 results map

1995 results map

1999 results map

2003 results map

2007 results map

2011 results map

2015 results map

2019 results map

2023 results map

== By-election results ==
A by-election occurs when seats become vacant between council elections. Below is a summary of by-elections from 1983 onwards. Full by-election results are listed under the last regular election preceding the by-election and can be found by clicking on the ward name.

=== 1984-1994 ===
Ward	Date	Incumbent party	Winning party
Long Row	7 November 1985	Independent	Conservative
New Costessey	15 September 1988	SLD	Conservative
Ditchingham	4 May 1989	SLD	SLD
Marshland	4 October 1990	Liberal Democrats	Liberal Democrats

=== 1995-2006 ===
Ward	Date	Incumbent party	Winning party
Diss	30 July 1998	Liberal Democrats	Liberal Democrats
Easton	16 September 2004	Conservative	Conservative
Diss	15 June 2006	Liberal Democrats	Conservative

=== 2007-2018 ===
Ward	Date	Incumbent party	Winning party
Diss	27 June 2008	Conservative	Conservative
New Costessey	2 May 2013	Liberal Democrats	Liberal Democrats
Chedgrave & Thurton	24 September 2015	Conservative	Conservative

=== 2019-present ===
Ward	Date	Incumbent party	Winning party
Mulbarton & Stoke; Holy Cross	5 May 2022	Liberal Democrats	Liberal Democrats
Mulbarton & Stoke; Holy Cross	28 September 2023	Liberal Democrats	Liberal Democrats
South Wymondham	28 September 2023	Liberal Democrats	Liberal Democrats
Bunwell	2 May 2024	Conservative	Green
Central Wymondham	22 January 2026	Conservative	Conservative
