= 1999 South Norfolk District Council election =

1999 English local government election

- 6 May 1999

All 47 seats to South Norfolk District Council 24 seats needed for a majority

	First party	Second party
Party	Liberal Democrats	Conservative
Seats won	27	16
Seat change	▼3	▲4
Popular vote	18,455	14,366
Percentage	45.0%	35.0%
Swing	▼1.7%	▲7.4%
	Third party	Fourth party
Party	Labour	Independent
Seats won	2	2
Seat change	▼1	Steady
Popular vote	6,513	1,596
Percentage	15.9%	3.9%
Swing	▼5.5%	▼0.1%
- Winner of each seat at the 1999 South Norfolk District Council election.
Control before election
Liberal Democrats
Control after election
Liberal Democrats

The 1999 South Norfolk District Council election took place on 6 May 1999 to elect members of South Norfolk District Council in Norfolk, England. This was on the same day as other local elections.

== Summary ==
=== Election result ===
1999 South Norfolk District Council election
Party	Candidates	Seats	Gains	Losses	Net gain/loss	Seats %	Votes %	Votes	+/−
Liberal Democrats	45	27	0	3	▼3	57.4	45.0	18,455	–1.7
Conservative	42	16	4	0	▲4	34.0	35.0	14,366	+7.4
Labour	46	2	1	2	▼1	4.3	15.9	6,513	–5.5
Independent	4	2	1	1	Steady	4.3	3.9	1,596	–0.1
Green	3	0	0	0	Steady	0.0	0.3	124	±0.0

== Ward results ==
Incumbent councillors standing for re-election are marked with an asterisk (*). Changes in seats do not take into account by-elections or defections.

=== Abbey ===
Abbey
Party	Candidate	Votes	%	±%
Conservative	P. Stearn	265	41.2	
Independent	K. Body*	211	32.8	
Labour	A. Gallon	167	26.0	
Majority		54	8.4	
Turnout		643	34.5	
Registered electors		1,880		
Conservative gain from Liberal Democrats		Swing		

=== Abbeyfield ===
Abbeyfield
Party	Candidate	Votes	%	±%
Labour	M. Wells	201	33.2	
Conservative	K. Saxton	184	30.4	
Independent	C. Stubbs	166	27.4	
Liberal Democrats	U. Bentley	55	9.1	
Majority		17	2.8	
Turnout		606	45.2	
Registered electors		1,353		
Labour gain from Independent		Swing		

=== Beauchamp ===
Beauchamp
Party	Candidate	Votes	%	±%
Conservative	A. Hawthorne*	379	55.7	
Liberal Democrats	P. Gray	155	22.8	
Labour	G. Brewster	121	17.8	
Green	I. Wagenknecht	26	3.8	
Majority		224	32.9	
Turnout		681	43.0	
Registered electors		1,588		
Conservative hold		Swing		

=== Beck Vale ===
Beck Vale
Party	Candidate	Votes	%	±%
Liberal Democrats	J. Halliday*	430	58.6	
Conservative	J. Tyler	261	35.6	
Labour	B. Ziolkowska	43	5.9	
Majority		169	23.0	
Turnout		734	42.0	
Registered electors		1,753		
Liberal Democrats hold		Swing		

=== Beckhithe ===
Beckhithe (2 seats)
Party	Candidate	Votes	%	±%
Liberal Democrats	J. Sutton	732		
Liberal Democrats	D. Hall*	722		
Conservative	C. Rose	492		
Conservative	B. Carver	465		
Labour	D. Clennell	220		
Labour	T. Clennell	205		
Turnout		~1,457	30.0	
Registered electors		4,855		
Liberal Democrats hold				
Liberal Democrats hold				

=== Berners ===
Berners
Party	Candidate	Votes	%	±%
Liberal Democrats	R. McClenning	387	47.6	
Conservative	W. Pearcy	348	42.8	
Labour	E. Bridgwood	78	9.6	
Majority		39	4.8	
Turnout		813	43.5	
Registered electors		1,882		
Liberal Democrats hold		Swing		

=== Boyland ===
Boyland
Party	Candidate	Votes	%	±%
Conservative	R. Hoare	344	39.5	
Liberal Democrats	A. Ross	277	31.8	
Labour	W. How	250	28.7	
Majority		67	7.7	
Turnout		871	38.9	
Registered electors		2,375		
Conservative hold		Swing		

=== Broads ===
Broads
Party	Candidate	Votes	%	±%
Conservative	S. Knollys*	422	60.4	
Labour	D. Higgins	108	15.5	
Liberal Democrats	E. Green	87	12.4	
Green	S. Wagenknecht	82	11.7	
Majority		314	44.9	
Turnout		699	44.6	
Registered electors		1,573		
Conservative hold		Swing		

=== Brookwood ===
Brookwood
Party	Candidate	Votes	%	±%
Conservative	K. Warman*	567	69.7	
Liberal Democrats	R. Lawes	143	17.6	
Labour	I. Lochhead	103	12.7	
Majority		424	52.2	
Turnout		813	48.9	
Registered electors		1,670		
Conservative hold		Swing		

=== Chet ===
Chet
Party	Candidate	Votes	%	±%
Conservative	C. Gould	584	58.3	
Labour	R. Ford	418	41.7	
Majority		166	16.6	
Turnout		1,002	42.4	
Registered electors		2,373		
Conservative hold		Swing		

=== Clavering ===
Clavering
Party	Candidate	Votes	%	±%
Liberal Democrats	P. Mitchell*	342	57.0	
Conservative	N. Legg	147	24.5	
Labour	S. Pank	111	18.5	
Majority		195	32.5	
Turnout		600	33.4	
Registered electors		1,797		
Liberal Democrats hold		Swing		

=== Cringleford & Colney ===
Cringleford & Colney
Party	Candidate	Votes	%	±%
Conservative	B. Rochfort	603	70.1	
Liberal Democrats	I. Speller	167	19.4	
Labour	M. Ranson	90	10.5	
Majority		436	50.7	
Turnout		860	46.4	
Registered electors		1,853		
Conservative hold		Swing		

=== Cromwells ===
Cromwells
Party	Candidate	Votes	%	±%
Liberal Democrats	F. Ronan	291	56.1	
Conservative	L. Elston	164	31.6	
Labour	J. Thurston	64	12.3	
Majority		127	24.5	
Turnout		519	38.1	
Registered electors		1,421		
Liberal Democrats hold		Swing		

=== Crown Point ===
Crown Point
Party	Candidate	Votes	%	±%
Conservative	R. Smith*	204	52.4	
Labour	J. King	125	32.1	
Liberal Democrats	G. Bradshaw	60	15.4	
Majority		79	20.3	
Turnout		389	43.8	
Registered electors		894		
Conservative hold		Swing		

=== Dickleburgh ===
Dickleburgh
Party	Candidate	Votes	%	±%
Conservative	M. Winridge	311	46.3	
Liberal Democrats	P. Allen*	295	44.0	
Labour	S. Davies	65	9.7	
Majority		16	2.4	
Turnout		671	47.9	
Registered electors		1,400		
Conservative gain from Liberal Democrats		Swing		

=== Diss ===
Diss (3 seats)
Party	Candidate	Votes	%	±%
Liberal Democrats	J. Caldwell*	1,001		
Liberal Democrats	I. Caldwell*	826		
Independent	V. Gregory	783		
Liberal Democrats	D. Cooper*	617		
Conservative	N. Mager	505		
Conservative	J. Savage	416		
Labour	M. Vyrnwy-Pierce	237		
Labour	R. Vyrnwy-Pierce	214		
Labour	J. Philip	166		
Turnout		~1,771	32.3	
Registered electors		5,483		
Liberal Democrats hold				
Liberal Democrats hold				
Independent gain from Liberal Democrats				

=== Ditchingham ===
Ditchingham
Party	Candidate	Votes	%	±%
Liberal Democrats	R. Carden*	435	55.2	
Conservative	T. Jones	238	30.2	
Labour	P. Nicholls	115	14.6	
Majority		197	25.0	
Turnout		788	42.8	
Registered electors		1,851		
Liberal Democrats hold		Swing		

=== Forehoe ===
Forehoe
Party	Candidate	Votes	%	±%
Liberal Democrats	J. Mackie*	360	60.2	
Conservative	S. Orton	238	39.8	
Majority		122	20.4	
Turnout		598	38.8	
Registered electors		1,553		
Liberal Democrats hold		Swing		

=== Harleston ===
Harleston
Party	Candidate	Votes	%	±%
Liberal Democrats	C. Hudson	669	59.4	
Conservative	H. Martin	332	29.5	
Labour	P. O'Connell	126	11.2	
Majority		337	29.9	
Turnout		1,127	34.6	
Registered electors		3,263		
Liberal Democrats hold		Swing		

=== Hempnall ===
Hempnall
Party	Candidate	Votes	%	±%
Liberal Democrats	L. Dye	385	61.8	
Conservative	C. Kemp	198	31.8	
Labour	D. Bulman	40	6.4	
Majority		187	30.0	
Turnout		623	43.8	
Registered electors		1,434		
Liberal Democrats hold		Swing		

=== Hingham ===
Hingham
Party	Candidate	Votes	%	±%
Liberal Democrats	P. Dore*	556	54.8	
Conservative	B. Flaxman	404	39.8	
Labour	P. Eldridge	55	5.4	
Majority		152	15.0	
Turnout		1,015	60.6	
Registered electors		1,694		
Liberal Democrats hold		Swing		

=== Humbleyard ===
Humbleyard
Party	Candidate	Votes	%	±%
Liberal Democrats	D. Pond	341	57.9	
Conservative	P. Hart	197	33.4	
Labour	R. Worf	35	5.9	
Green	R. Walmsley	16	2.7	
Majority		144	24.4	
Turnout		589	46.4	
Registered electors		1,271		
Liberal Democrats hold		Swing		

=== Kidner ===
Kidner
Party	Candidate	Votes	%	±%
Independent	M. Tomlinson*	436	66.2	
Liberal Democrats	A. Bedford	146	22.2	
Labour	K. Chandler	77	11.7	
Majority		290	44.0	
Turnout		659	43.0	
Registered electors		1,538		
Independent hold		Swing		

=== Long Row ===
Long Row
Party	Candidate	Votes	%	±%
Labour	Daniel Zeichner*	355	45.6	
Conservative	J. Tarry	348	44.7	
Liberal Democrats	R. Myall	76	9.8	
Majority		7	0.9	
Turnout		779	51.8	
Registered electors		1,516		
Labour hold		Swing		

=== Marshland ===
Marshland
Party	Candidate	Votes	%	±%
Liberal Democrats	E. Playle*	305	70.4	
Labour	J. Sauverin	128	29.6	
Majority		177	40.9	
Turnout		433	29.3	
Registered electors		1,500		
Liberal Democrats hold		Swing		

=== Mergate ===
Mergate
Party	Candidate	Votes	%	±%
Liberal Democrats	A. Baker*	646	60.4	
Conservative	L. Loveless	289	27.0	
Labour	G. Neatham	134	12.5	
Majority		357	33.4	
Turnout		1,069	37.3	
Registered electors		2,877		
Liberal Democrats hold		Swing		

=== New Costessey ===
New Costessey (2 seats)
Party	Candidate	Votes	%	±%
Liberal Democrats	L. Webster*	563		
Liberal Democrats	W. Dinneen*	553		
Conservative	G. Russell	182		
Labour	I. Button	137		
Labour	S. Button	131		
Turnout		~873	24.7	
Registered electors		3,533		
Liberal Democrats hold				
Liberal Democrats hold				

=== Northfields ===
Northfields
Party	Candidate	Votes	%	±%
Conservative	J. Mooney*	477	62.5	
Labour	J. Shephard	173	22.7	
Liberal Democrats	C. Collyer	113	14.8	
Majority		304	39.8	
Turnout		763	41.3	
Registered electors		1,863		
Conservative hold		Swing		

=== Old Costessey ===
Old Costessey (2 seats)
Party	Candidate	Votes	%	±%
Liberal Democrats	T. East*	826		
Liberal Democrats	R. Smith*	742		
Conservative	E. Senior	306		
Labour	S. Lavall	113		
Labour	B. Stuart	112		
Turnout		~1,196	27.2	
Registered electors		4,399		
Liberal Democrats hold				
Liberal Democrats hold				

=== Poringland With The Framinghams ===
Poringland With The Framinghams (2 seats)
Party	Candidate	Votes	%	±%
Liberal Democrats	J. Walker	699		
Liberal Democrats	D. Gudgeon	675		
Conservative	F. Brown	595		
Conservative	J. Kidner	584		
Labour	T. Sanders	176		
Labour	A. Perkins	174		
Turnout		~1,448	42.2	
Registered electors		3,432		
Liberal Democrats hold				
Liberal Democrats hold				

=== Rustens ===
Rustens
Party	Candidate	Votes	%	±%
Conservative	D. Cox	403	49.0	
Labour	R. Barber*	294	35.8	
Liberal Democrats	T. Ellingworth	125	15.2	
Majority		109	13.3	
Turnout		822	36.5	
Registered electors		2,259		
Conservative gain from Labour		Swing		

=== Scole ===
Scole
Party	Candidate	Votes	%	±%
Conservative	V. Alexander*	415	56.2	
Liberal Democrats	B. Whiting	233	31.5	
Labour	I. Stebbing	91	12.3	
Majority		182	24.6	
Turnout		739	41.4	
Registered electors		1,793		
Conservative hold		Swing		

=== Smockmill ===
Smockmill
Party	Candidate	Votes	%	±%
Liberal Democrats	J. Peterson*	424	56.1	
Conservative	M. Parker	229	30.3	
Labour	E. Brown	103	13.6	
Majority		195	25.8	
Turnout		756	39.3	
Registered electors		1,936		
Liberal Democrats hold		Swing		

=== Springfields ===
Springfields
Party	Candidate	Votes	%	±%
Conservative	B. Spratt	293	50.6	
Liberal Democrats	B. Forrer	223	38.5	
Labour	B. Whall	63	10.9	
Majority		70	12.1	
Turnout		579	45.1	
Registered electors		1,289		
Conservative hold		Swing		

=== Stratton ===
Stratton
Party	Candidate	Votes	%	±%
Liberal Democrats	P. Smith*	478	59.9	
Labour	G. Aitken	190	23.8	
Conservative	P. Carver	130	16.3	
Majority		288	36.1	
Turnout		798	31.2	
Registered electors		2,559		
Liberal Democrats hold		Swing		

=== Tasvale ===
Tasvale
Party	Candidate	Votes	%	±%
Liberal Democrats	P. Bradshaw*	752	81.6	
Conservative	D. Baker	128	13.9	
Labour	R. Cottey	42	4.6	
Majority		624	67.7	
Turnout		922	54.2	
Registered electors		1,706		
Liberal Democrats hold		Swing		

=== Town ===
Town
Party	Candidate	Votes	%	±%
Conservative	M. Wynne	452	51.2	
Liberal Democrats	R. Marchant	237	26.9	
Labour	P. Gregory	193	21.9	
Majority		215	24.4	
Turnout		882	42.8	
Registered electors		2,080		
Conservative gain from Labour		Swing		

=== Valley ===
Valley
Party	Candidate	Votes	%	±%
Liberal Democrats	M. Gray*	596	74.4	
Conservative	P. Leatherbarrow	135	16.9	
Labour	A. Holland	70	8.7	
Majority		461	57.6	
Turnout		801	46.3	
Registered electors		1,738		
Liberal Democrats hold		Swing		

=== Waveney ===
Waveney
Party	Candidate	Votes	%	±%
Liberal Democrats	F. Mitchell*	274	43.2	
Conservative	A. Tomkinson	265	41.8	
Labour	B. Falkner	95	15.0	
Majority		9	1.4	
Turnout		634	42.2	
Registered electors		1,501		
Liberal Democrats hold		Swing		

=== Westwood ===
Westwood
Party	Candidate	Votes	%	±%
Conservative	N. Chapman*	587	57.3	
Liberal Democrats	C. Pitt	222	21.7	
Labour	S. Blaikie	215	21.0	
Majority		365	35.6	
Turnout		1,024	40.9	
Registered electors		2,529		
Conservative hold		Swing		

=== Wodehouse ===
Wodehouse
Party	Candidate	Votes	%	±%
Conservative	H. Egerton-Smith	280	47.9	
Liberal Democrats	J. Cowan	214	36.6	
Labour	K. O'Grady	90	15.4	
Majority		66	11.3	
Turnout		584	44.2	
Registered electors		1,326		
Conservative hold		Swing		
