= 2023 South Norfolk District Council election =

- 4 May 2023

All 46 seats to South Norfolk District Council 24 seats needed for a majority

	First party	Second party
Leader	John Fuller	Chris Brown
Party	Conservative	Liberal Democrats
Last election	35 seats, 47.0%	10 seats, 30.2%
Seats before	32	10
Seats won	24	11
Seat change	▼11	▲1
Popular vote	28,461	15,945
Percentage	39.3%	22.0%
Swing	▼7.7%	▼8.2%
	Third party	Fourth party
Party	Labour	Independent
Last election	1 seat, 17.3%	0 seats, 1.1%
Seats before	1	3
Seats won	9	2
Seat change	▲8	▲2
Popular vote	19,107	1,514
Percentage	26.4%	2.1%
Swing	▲9.1%	▲1.0%
- Winner of each seat at the 2023 South Norfolk District Council election
Leader before election
John Fuller
Conservative
Leader after election
John Fuller
Conservative

The 2023 South Norfolk District Council election took place on 4 May 2023 to elect members of South Norfolk District Council in Norfolk, England. This was on the same day as other local elections across England.

== Summary ==
The Conservatives retained control of the council, but with a reduced majority.

=== Election result ===
2023 South Norfolk District Council election
Party	Candidates	Seats	Gains	Losses	Net gain/loss	Seats %	Votes %	Votes	+/−
Conservative	46	24	0	11	▼11	52.2	39.3	28,461	–7.7
Liberal Democrats	26	11	3	2	▲1	23.9	22.0	15,945	–8.2
Labour	41	9	8	0	▲8	19.6	26.4	19,107	+9.1
Independent	3	2	2	0	▲2	4.3	2.1	1,514	+1.0
Green	24	0	0	0	Steady	0.0	10.0	7,259	+8.6
Reform	1	0	0	0	Steady	0.0	0.2	110	N/A

== Ward results ==
Full election results were released by South Norfolk District Council following the conclusion of the 2023 English local elections on May 4.

=== Beck Vale, Dickleburgh & Scole ===
Beck Vale, Dickleburgh & Scole (2 seats)
Party	Candidate	Votes	%	±%
Independent	Clayton Hudson*	870	45.9	N/A
Conservative	Delme Thompson	570	30.1	–26.6
Conservative	Victoria Tuck	501	26.4	–25.0
Green	Hilary Hardy	485	25.6	N/A
Labour	Pam Reekie	429	22.6	+1.3
Liberal Democrats	Fiona Wenman	269	14.2	–11.4
Green	Ian Boreham	202	10.7	N/A
Turnout		1,895	35.9	–0.4
Registered electors		5,275		
Independent gain from Conservative				
Conservative hold				

=== Bressingham & Burston ===
Bressingham & Burston
Party	Candidate	Votes	%	±%
Conservative	James Easter*	506	50.2	+5.3
Liberal Democrats	Brian Norman	166	16.5	–0.3
Labour	Derek Rocholl	163	16.2	+5.1
Green	David Reynolds	162	16.1	+1.3
Turnout		1,007	36.4	–2.4
Registered electors		2,768		
Conservative hold		Swing	▲2.8	

=== Brooke ===
Brooke
Party	Candidate	Votes	%	±%
Conservative	John Fuller*	609	50.2	–4.8
Green	Jon Treby	295	24.3	N/A
Labour	Tom Fowler	293	24.1	+9.8
Turnout		1,214	44.5	–6.0
Registered electors		2,730		
Conservative hold		Swing	N/A	

=== Bunwell ===
Bunwell
Party	Candidate	Votes	%	±%
Conservative	Stephen Ridley*	418	48.0	–9.7
Labour	John Chapman	197	22.6	+5.2
Liberal Democrats	Bodo Rissmann	157	18.0	–6.9
Green	Mike Gooch	99	11.4	N/A
Turnout		881	35.5	–2.1
Registered electors		2,485		
Conservative hold		Swing	▼7.5	

=== Central Wymondham ===
Central Wymondham (2 seats)
Party	Candidate	Votes	%	±%
Conservative	Kevin Hurn*	697	37.1	–3.8
Conservative	Robert Savage*	659	35.1	–4.6
Green	Joe Barrett	579	30.8	N/A
Labour	Todd Baker	571	30.4	+11.4
Green	Victoria Walters	542	28.8	N/A
Labour	Lowell Doheny	454	24.1	+7.1
Reform	Andrew Pond	110	5.9	N/A
Turnout		1,880	39.2	+1.6
Registered electors		4,799		
Conservative hold				
Conservative hold				

=== Cringleford ===
Cringleford (2 seats)
Party	Candidate	Votes	%	±%
Labour	Deborah Sacks	744	43.2	+10.5
Conservative	Daniel Elmer*	704	40.8	–5.1
Conservative	William Kemp*	694	40.3	–5.3
Labour	David Vail	682	39.6	+11.6
Liberal Democrats	Ed Harris	433	25.1	–3.0
Turnout		1,724	41.3	+2.2
Registered electors		4,177		
Labour gain from Conservative				
Conservative hold				

=== Diss & Roydon ===
Diss & Roydon (3 seats)
Party	Candidate	Votes	%	±%
Conservative	Graham Minshull*	1,056	43.7	–4.4
Conservative	Keith Kiddle*	1,024	42.4	–4.3
Conservative	Kieran Murphy	906	37.5	–5.4
Liberal Democrats	Sonia Browne	598	24.8	–2.1
Liberal Democrats	Trevor Wenman	553	22.9	–1.8
Labour Co-op	Tim Daniel	452	18.7	–1.0
Green	Anne-Marie McGinty	444	18.4	N/A
Labour Co-op	Ann Reeder	438	18.1	+0.2
Liberal Democrats	Andrew Howard	410	17.0	–6.0
Labour	Ian Copple	394	16.3	–1.2
Green	Matthew Roe	262	10.8	N/A
Green	Tom Williamson	253	10.5	N/A
Turnout		2,416	28.3	–1.0
Registered electors		8,534		
Conservative hold				
Conservative hold				
Conservative hold				

=== Ditchingham & Earsham ===
Ditchingham & Earsham (2 seats)
Party	Candidate	Votes	%	±%
Liberal Democrats	Brendon Bernard*	745	40.6	−7.0
Liberal Democrats	Christopher Brown*	641	34.9	−6.8
Conservative	Olly Clitheroe	567	30.9	+1.9
Conservative	Martin Wilby	534	29.1	+0.6
Green	John Connor	407	22.2	N/A
Green	Sally Hobson	337	18.3	N/A
Labour	Colin Kirk	228	12.4	±0.0
Turnout		1,837	35.14	
Liberal Democrats hold				
Liberal Democrats hold				

=== Easton ===
Easton
Party	Candidate	Votes	%	±%
Conservative	Margaret Dewsbury*	304	59.1	−3.3
Labour	Elaine McKinna	206	40.1	+22.7
Turnout		514	32.89	
Conservative hold		Swing		

=== Forncett ===
Forncett
Party	Candidate	Votes	%	±%
Conservative	Kim Carsok	361	37.6	−9.5
Liberal Democrats	Bob McClenning	274	28.5	−7.2
Labour	Peter Reason	168	17.5	+0.4
Green	Carol Sharp	146	15.2	N/A
Turnout		960	34.13	
Conservative hold		Swing		

=== Harleston ===
Harleston (2 seats)
Party	Candidate	Votes	%	±%
Conservative	Trevor Graham	583	38.1	−3.0
Labour	James Eddy	547	35.8	+10.5
Conservative	Ben Potterton	512	33.5	−4.7
Liberal Democrats	Sue Kuzmic	468	30.1	+4.7
Green	Andrew Newby	372	24.3	N/A
Green	Sandra Brown	257	16.8	N/A
Turnout		1,530	31.85	
Conservative hold				
Labour gain from Conservative				

=== Hempnall ===
Hempnall
Party	Candidate	Votes	%	±%
Conservative	Martyn Hooton	508	52.4	+2.5
Labour	Elana Katz	440	45.4	+26.8
Turnout		969	37.14	
Conservative hold		Swing		

=== Hethersett ===
Hethersett (3 seats)
Party	Candidate	Votes	%	±%
Conservative	David Bills*	1,001	41.4	−14.6
Conservative	Kathryn Cross	922	38.2	−11.1
Labour Co-op	John Morland	896	37.1	+6.4
Conservative	Salena Dawson	847	35.1	−12.3
Labour	Jakob Marshall	690	28.6	+6.1
Green	Paul Barrett	643	26.6	N/A
Labour	Steven Palmer	592	24.5	N/A
Liberal Democrats	Paul Balthwayt	584	24.2	−20.1
Independent	Francisco Paco	230	9.5	N/A
Turnout		2,416	34.33	
Conservative hold				
Conservative hold				
Labour gain from Conservative				

=== Hingham & Deopham ===
Hingham & Deopham
Party	Candidate	Votes	%	±%
Conservative	Josh Woolliscoft	451	53.6	−17.2
Labour	Gavin Nobes	223	26.5	N/A
Green	Corrina Willmoth	164	19.5	N/A
Turnout		842	33.20	
Conservative hold		Swing		

=== Loddon & Chedgrave ===
Loddon & Chedgrave (2 seats)
Party	Candidate	Votes	%	±%
Labour	Jeremy Rowe*	1,031	57.0	+18.2
Conservative	Kay Mason Billig*	802	44.4	−0.6
Labour	Carl Brown	422	23.3	N/A
Conservative	Mike Melling	412	22.8	−8.8
Green	Eric Wareham	373	20.6	N/A
Liberal Democrats	Trevor Lewis	192	10.6	−17.5
Turnout		1,808	38.02	
Labour hold				
Conservative hold				

=== Mulbarton & Stoke Holy Cross ===
Mulbarton & Stoke Holy Cross (3 seats)
Party	Candidate	Votes	%	±%
Liberal Democrats	Ian Spratt	1,460	49.8	+19.5
Liberal Democrats	Julian Fulcher	1,342	45.7	+7.9
Liberal Democrats	Jim Webber	1,307	44.5	+17.8
Conservative	Nigel Legg*	1,055	36.0	−13.1
Conservative	John Irving	893	30.4	−9.7
Conservative	Daniel Taylor	819	27.9	−7.4
Labour	Geraldine Smith-Cullen	497	16.9	−1.2
Labour	Michael Cutting	467	15.9	−2.2
Labour	Neil Tracey	399	14.0	+0.1
Turnout		2,934	39.64	
Liberal Democrats gain from Conservative				
Liberal Democrats gain from Conservative				
Liberal Democrats hold				

=== New Costessey ===
New Costessey (2 seats)
Party	Candidate	Votes	%	±%
Liberal Democrats	Gary Blundell	558	41.9	−2.9
Labour	Jenny McCloskey	452	34.0	+16.9
Conservative	Philip Hardy	335	25.2	+3.8
Liberal Democrats	Annette James	308	23.1	−14.7
Conservative	Hilary Gauthier	306	23.0	+2.4
Labour	Graham Shepherd	260	19.5	+6.4
Green	Owen Watkins	234	17.6	N/A
Turnout		1,331	26.75	
Liberal Democrats hold				
Labour gain from Liberal Democrats				

=== Newton Flotman ===
Newton Flotman
Party	Candidate	Votes	%	±%
Independent	John Cook	414	41.1	N/A
Conservative	Laura Webster	335	33.2	−18.6
Labour	Steven Sewell	254	25.2	+6.0
Turnout		1,008	40.22	
Independent gain from Conservative		Swing		

=== North Wymondham ===
North Wymondham (2 seats)
Party	Candidate	Votes	%	±%
Labour Co-op	Michael Rosen	715	48.2	+28.2
Liberal Democrats	Dave Roberts	653	44.0	+16.3
Conservative	Tony Holden*	643	43.4	−3.3
Conservative	Jack Hornby*	510	34.4	−6.6
Turnout		1,483	30.34	
Labour Co-op gain from Conservative				
Liberal Democrats gain from Conservative				

=== Old Costessey ===
Old Costessey (3 seats)
Party	Candidate	Votes	%	±%
Liberal Democrats	Sharon Blundell*	879	47.2	−11.7
Liberal Democrats	Terry Laidlaw*	675	36.2	−8.5
Labour	Justin Cork	565	30.3	+6.7
Labour	Ben Fiaz	557	29.9	N/A
Labour	Clare Mascall	522	28.0	N/A
Liberal Democrats	Dean Toms	426	22.9	−14.3
Conservative	Leslie Dale	399	21.4	−8.0
Conservative	Jamie Mulhall	377	20.2	−6.8
Conservative	Jane Fisher	362	19.4	−2.5
Green	David Evans	288	15.5	N/A
Turnout		1,864	25.13	
Liberal Democrats hold				
Liberal Democrats hold				
Labour gain from Liberal Democrats				

=== Poringland, Framinghams & Trowse ===
Poringland, Framinghams & Trowse (3 seats)
Party	Candidate	Votes	%	±%
Conservative	John Overton*	1,151	48.1	+3.2
Conservative	Lisa Neal*	1,110	46.4	+7.2
Labour	Nicola Fowler	1,082	45.2	+30.0
Conservative	Trevor Spruce*	1,077	45.0	+8.1
Liberal Democrats	David Bingham	1,036	43.3	+10.4
Labour	Anna Knight	949	39.7	+27.0
Turnout		2,393	36.90	
Conservative hold				
Conservative hold				
Labour gain from Conservative				

=== Rockland ===
Rockland
Party	Candidate	Votes	%	±%
Conservative	Vic Thomson*	472	40.3	−0.5
Labour	Martin White	418	35.7	+17.7
Green	Juliette Harkin	270	23.1	+6.2
Turnout		1,170	42.15	
Conservative hold		Swing		

=== South Wymondham ===
South Wymondham (2 seats)
Party	Candidate	Votes	%	±%
Liberal Democrats	Suzanne Nuri-Nixon*	752	48.1	−8.5
Liberal Democrats	Julian Halls*	661	42.2	−8.6
Conservative	Martyn Lemon	443	28.3	−7.3
Labour	Carmel Greene	392	25.0	N/A
Conservative	Andrew Powell	356	22.7	−13.7
Labour	Joe McCarthy	313	20.0	N/A
Turnout		1,565	32.10	
Liberal Democrats hold				
Liberal Democrats hold				

=== Stratton ===
Stratton (2 seats)
Party	Candidate	Votes	%	±%
Labour	Georgina Race	361	43.7	+30.7
Conservative	Jonathan Carver	351	42.4	−10.0
Conservative	Evie Scarborough-Taylor	328	39.7	+1.2
Labour	David Reekie	271	32.8	+19.9
Green	Claire Sparkes	175	21.2	N/A
Turnout		826	24.75	
Labour gain from Conservative				
Conservative hold				

=== Thurlton ===
Thurlton
Party	Candidate	Votes	%	±%
Conservative	Andrew Evans	405	39.4	−6.4
Liberal Democrats	Peter Harrison	398	38.7	+3.5
Labour	Sally Blaikie	210	20.4	+1.4
Turnout		1,028	38.47	
Conservative hold		Swing		

=== Wicklewood ===
Wicklewood
Party	Candidate	Votes	%	±%
Conservative	Richard Elliott*	557	51.1	−6.6
Green	Rachel Barrett	270	24.8	+1.5
Labour	Michael Crouch	259	23.8	N/A
Turnout		1,090	40.10	
Conservative hold		Swing		

== By-elections ==
=== Mulbarton and Stoke Holy Cross ===
Mulbarton and Stoke Holy Cross: 28 September 2023
Party	Candidate	Votes	%	±%
Liberal Democrats	Robert McClenning	667	37.1	–11.4
Conservative	Tony Holden	434	24.2	–10.8
Independent	Nigel Legg	404	22.5	N/A
Labour	Geraldine Smith-Cullen	164	9.1	–7.4
Green	Claire Sparkes	128	7.1	N/A
Majority		233	12.9	N/A
Turnout		1,801	24.5	−15.1
Registered electors		7,365		
Liberal Democrats hold		Swing	▼0.3	

=== South Wymondham ===
South Wymondham: 28 September 2023
Party	Candidate	Votes	%	±%
Liberal Democrats	Carmina McConnell	286	35.0	–12.4
Conservative	Martyn Lemon	268	32.8	+4.9
Labour	Lowell Doheny	173	21.2	–3.5
Green	Victoria Walters	89	10.9	N/A
Majority		18	2.2	N/A
Turnout		822	16.8	−15.3
Registered electors		4,907		
Liberal Democrats hold		Swing	▼8.7	

=== Bunwell ===
Bunwell: 2 May 2024
Party	Candidate	Votes	%	±%
Green	Suzanne Wateridge	404	40.5	+29.1
Conservative	Charles Easton	394	39.5	−9.5
Labour	Michael Crouch	131	13.1	−9.5
Liberal Democrats	Trevor Wenman	68	6.8	−11.2
Majority		10	1.0	N/A
Turnout		997	39.8	+4.3
Registered electors		2,521		
Green gain from Conservative		Swing	+19.3	

=== Central Wymondham ===
Central Wymondham: 22 January 2026
Party	Candidate	Votes	%	±%
Conservative	Jonathan Purle	545	31.0	▼6.5
Green	Paul Barrett	454	25.9	▼4.9
Reform	Anthony Spears	363	20.7	▲14.8
Liberal Democrats	Stephen Witt	211	12.0	N/A
Labour	Lowell Doheny	182	10.4	▼20
Turnout		1,755	37.5	▼1.7
Registered electors		4,682		
Conservative hold				

By-election triggered by death of Conservative councillor Kevin Hurn on October 31st 2025.
