= 1973 South Norfolk District Council election =

1973 English local election

- 10 May 1973

All 47 seats to South Norfolk District Council 24 seats needed for a majority

	First party	Second party
Party	Independent	Labour
Seats won	33	7
Popular vote	17,514	10,856
Percentage	50.7%	31.4%
	Third party	Fourth party
Party	Conservative	Liberal
Seats won	6	1
Popular vote	2,019	3,672
Percentage	5.8%	10.6%
Control after election
Independent

The 1973 South Norfolk District Council election took place on 10 May 1973 to elect members of South Norfolk District Council in Norfolk, England. This was on the same day as other local elections.

This was the inaugural election of the council following its formation by the Local Government Act 1972.

== Summary ==
=== Election result ===
1973 South Norfolk District Council election
Party	Candidates	Seats	Gains	Losses	Net gain/loss	Seats %	Votes %	Votes	+/−
Independent	61	33	N/A	N/A	N/A	70.2	50.7	17,514	N/A
Labour	25	7	N/A	N/A	N/A	14.9	31.4	10,856	N/A
Conservative	7	6	N/A	N/A	N/A	12.8	5.8	2,019	N/A
Liberal	14	1	N/A	N/A	N/A	2.1	10.6	3,672	N/A
Ratepayer	1	0	N/A	N/A	N/A	0.0	1.1	385	N/A
Ind. Conservative	1	0	N/A	N/A	N/A	0.0	0.2	84	N/A

== Ward results ==
Incumbent councillors standing for re-election are marked with an asterisk (*). Changes in seats do not take into account by-elections or defections.

=== Abbeyfield ===
Abbeyfield
Party	Candidate	Votes	%
Labour	F. Warman	166	36.8
Independent	P. Fairhead	108	23.9
Independent	L. Wallis	99	22.0
Independent	R. Ashbee	78	17.3
Majority		58	12.9
Turnout		451	35.1
Registered electors		1,286	
Labour win (new seat)			

=== Beck Vale ===
Beck Vale
Party	Candidate	Votes	%
Independent	P. Smoothy	260	35.4
Labour	R. Leeder	178	24.3
Independent	R. Aldridge	162	22.1
Liberal	J. Knowlden	134	18.3
Majority		82	11.2
Turnout		734	48.5
Registered electors		1,512	
Independent win (new seat)			

=== Beckhithe ===
Beckhithe (2 seats)
Party	Candidate	Votes	%
Independent	H. Back	514	58.1
Independent	K. Wiles	444	50.2
Labour	G. Williams	371	41.9
Labour	E. Parker	368	41.6
Independent	T. Cole	171	19.3
Turnout		~885	31.0
Registered electors		2,855	
Independent win (new seat)			
Independent win (new seat)			

=== Berners ===
Berners
Party	Candidate	Votes	%
Independent	R. Tilbrook	354	62.9
Independent	N. Poll	158	28.1
Liberal	B. Middleton	51	9.1
Majority		196	34.8
Turnout		563	43.4
Registered electors		1,297	
Independent win (new seat)			

=== Boyland ===
Boyland
Party	Candidate	Votes	%
Independent	E. Lines	182	53.1
Independent	W. Gaze	161	46.9
Majority		21	6.1
Turnout		343	24.7
Registered electors		1,390	
Independent win (new seat)			

=== Brookwood ===
Brookwood
Party	Candidate	Votes	%
Conservative	G. Vivian-Neal	Unopposed	
Registered electors		1,377	
Conservative win (new seat)			

=== Chet ===
Chet
Party	Candidate	Votes	%
Independent	W. Hemmant	266	47.4
Labour	R. Garrod	211	37.6
Ind. Conservative	D. Rand	84	15.0
Majority		55	9.8
Turnout		561	39.8
Registered electors		1,410	
Independent win (new seat)			

=== Clavering ===
Clavering
Party	Candidate	Votes	%
Independent	G. Harris	181	57.3
Independent	P. Reynolds	135	42.7
Majority		46	14.6
Turnout		316	22.4
Registered electors		1,411	
Independent win (new seat)			

=== Cringleford & Colney ===
Cringleford & Colney
Party	Candidate	Votes	%
Conservative	J. Aikens	449	60.7
Independent	F. Hinchliffe	210	28.4
Labour	R. James	81	10.9
Majority		239	32.3
Turnout		740	50.8
Registered electors		1,458	
Conservative win (new seat)			

=== Crown Point ===
Crown Point
Party	Candidate	Votes	%
Independent	G. Johnson	Unopposed	
Registered electors		1,049	
Independent win (new seat)			

=== Dickleburgh ===
Dickleburgh
Party	Candidate	Votes	%
Independent	H. Laws	Unopposed	
Registered electors		1,145	
Independent win (new seat)			

=== Diss ===
Diss (3 seats)
Party	Candidate	Votes	%
Independent	J. Speirs	574	35.0
Conservative	J. Scogging	500	30.5
Conservative	D. Bell	490	29.9
Conservative	C. Grace	377	23.0
Labour	J. Davies	292	17.8
Liberal	P. Chamberlain	272	16.6
Turnout		~1,639	47.0
Registered electors		3,485	
Independent win (new seat)			
Conservative win (new seat)			
Conservative win (new seat)			

=== Ditchingham ===
Ditchingham
Party	Candidate	Votes	%
Conservative	M. Hood	203	60.4
Labour	W. Baxter	133	39.6
Majority		70	20.8
Turnout		336	24.5
Registered electors		1,371	
Conservative win (new seat)			

=== Forehoe ===
Forehoe
Party	Candidate	Votes	%
Independent	B. Cook	253	55.0
Independent	R. Hardy	207	45.0
Majority		46	10.0
Turnout		460	33.3
Registered electors		1,383	
Independent win (new seat)			

=== Harleston ===
Harleston
Party	Candidate	Votes	%
Liberal	S. Burton	504	55.6
Independent	W. Farrar	258	28.5
Labour	E. Huxtable	144	15.9
Majority		246	27.2
Turnout		906	47.0
Registered electors		1,926	
Liberal win (new seat)			

=== Hempnall ===
Hempnall
Party	Candidate	Votes	%
Independent	H. Sargent	223	65.0
Labour	A. Johnson	120	35.0
Majority		103	30.0
Turnout		343	31.5
Registered electors		1,088	
Independent win (new seat)			

=== Hingham ===
Hingham
Party	Candidate	Votes	%
Independent	R. Wiltshire	335	56.6
Labour	A. Lord	257	43.4
Majority		78	13.2
Turnout		592	48.6
Registered electors		1,218	
Independent win (new seat)			

=== Humbleyard ===
Humbleyard
Party	Candidate	Votes	%
Independent	V. Bullen	174	58.6
Labour	M. Aldous	123	41.4
Majority		51	17.2
Turnout		297	23.4
Registered electors		1,270	
Independent win (new seat)			

=== Kidner ===
Kidner
Party	Candidate	Votes	%
Independent	S. Peacock	236	54.4
Independent	H. Wyeld	198	45.6
Majority		38	8.8
Turnout		434	34.8
Registered electors		1,248	
Independent win (new seat)			

=== Long Row ===
Long Row
Party	Candidate	Votes	%
Independent	T. Potter	Unopposed	
Registered electors		1,300	
Independent win (new seat)			

=== Marshland ===
Marshland
Party	Candidate	Votes	%
Labour	E. Rochford	345	61.5
Independent	M. Bramley	216	38.5
Majority		129	23.0
Turnout		561	46.1
Registered electors		1,217	
Labour win (new seat)			

=== Mergate ===
Mergate
Party	Candidate	Votes	%
Independent	J. Bond	285	62.2
Labour	M. Huggins	173	37.8
Majority		112	24.5
Turnout		458	30.4
Registered electors		1,509	
Independent win (new seat)			

=== No. 19 (Costessey) ===
No. 19 (Costessey) (4 seats)
Party	Candidate	Votes	%
Labour	A. Christie	760	42.0
Independent	C. Barnes	662	36.6
Labour	R. Johnson	633	35.0
Independent	R. Dawson	630	34.8
Independent	J. Dyer	614	34.0
Labour	F. Merritt	609	33.7
Labour	J. Rackett	595	32.9
Independent	D. Wiskerd	589	32.6
Ratepayer	A. Whitehead	385	21.3
Turnout		~1,808	27.5
Registered electors		6,576	
Labour win (new seat)			
Independent win (new seat)			
Labour win (new seat)			
Independent win (new seat)			

=== No. 2 (Wymondham) ===
No. 2 (Wymondham) (5 seats)
Party	Candidate	Votes	%
Labour	J. Chamberlain	1,185	41.7
Labour	R. Young	1,101	38.7
Labour	F. Fields	951	33.4
Independent	H. Hudson	880	30.9
Independent	E. Capps	863	30.3
Independent	J. Meadows	859	30.2
Labour	R. Cobb	858	30.2
Independent	P. Ford	834	29.3
Liberal	G. Mabbutt	782	27.5
Labour	A. Reilly	757	26.6
Independent	A. Nickalls	624	21.9
Independent	P. Hindley	586	20.6
Independent	A. Taylor	542	19.1
Liberal	D. Moore	351	12.3
Liberal	T. Hickson	322	11.3
Liberal	H. Lawson	318	11.2
Liberal	H. Benham	282	9.9
Turnout		~2,844	42.3
Registered electors		6,723	
Labour win (new seat)			
Labour win (new seat)			
Labour win (new seat)			
Independent win (new seat)			
Independent win (new seat)			

=== No. 28 (Rockland St. Mary) ===
No. 28 (Rockland St. Mary)
Party	Candidate	Votes	%
Independent	C. Sewell	189	39.8
Independent	M. Kimmins	176	37.1
Independent	W. Windsor	71	14.9
Independent	D. Stanway	39	8.2
Majority		13	2.7
Turnout		475	42.0
Registered electors		1,132	
Independent win (new seat)			

=== No. 29 (Thurton) ===
No. 29 (Thurton)
Party	Candidate	Votes	%
Independent	L. Lester	278	51.2
Independent	M. Brown	213	39.2
Independent	J. Chappell	52	9.6
Majority		65	12.0
Turnout		543	41.0
Registered electors		1,324	
Independent win (new seat)			

=== Poringland With The Framinghams ===
Poringland With The Framinghams (2 seats)
Party	Candidate	Votes	%
Conservative	B. Yates	Unopposed	
Independent	R. Sykes	Unopposed	
Registered electors		2,188	
Conservative win (new seat)			
Independent win (new seat)			

=== Scole ===
Scole
Party	Candidate	Votes	%
Independent	H. Young	286	61.9
Independent	M. Philpot	113	24.5
Liberal	R. Cornwell	63	13.6
Majority		173	37.4
Turnout		462	33.8
Registered electors		1,365	
Independent win (new seat)			

=== Smockmill ===
Smockmill
Party	Candidate	Votes	%
Independent	J. Brighton	350	53.3
Labour	C. Dawson	307	46.7
Majority		43	6.5
Turnout		657	43.3
Registered electors		1,517	
Independent win (new seat)			

=== Springfields ===
Springfields
Party	Candidate	Votes	%
Independent	J. Chapman	214	63.1
Liberal	G. Lain	125	36.9
Majority		89	26.3
Turnout		339	33.8
Registered electors		1,004	
Independent win (new seat)			

=== Stratton ===
Stratton
Party	Candidate	Votes	%
Independent	S. Harker	304	54.3
Labour	R. Cooke	138	24.6
Liberal	C. Pursey	118	21.1
Majority		166	29.6
Turnout		560	37.0
Registered electors		1,512	
Independent win (new seat)			

=== Tasvale ===
Tasvale
Party	Candidate	Votes	%
Independent	P. Starling	Unopposed	
Registered electors		1,408	
Independent win (new seat)			

=== Valley ===
Valley
Party	Candidate	Votes	%
Independent	L. England	396	59.0
Liberal	H. Pagan	167	24.9
Independent	B. Palmer	108	16.1
Majority		229	34.1
Turnout		671	45.6
Registered electors		1,473	
Independent win (new seat)			

=== Waveney ===
Waveney
Party	Candidate	Votes	%
Independent	M. Martin	Unopposed	
Registered electors		1,453	
Independent win (new seat)			

=== Westwood ===
Westwood
Party	Candidate	Votes	%
Independent	N. Chapman	484	61.8
Liberal	T. Mayes	183	23.4
Independent	F. Shephard	116	14.8
Majority		301	38.4
Turnout		783	49.8
Registered electors		1,571	
Independent win (new seat)			

=== Wodehouse ===
Wodehouse
Party	Candidate	Votes	%
Independent	A. Cook	Unopposed	
Registered electors		1,092	
Independent win (new seat)			
