= 2007 South Norfolk District Council election =

South Norfolk District Council election

Results of the 2007 South Norfolk District Council election

The 2007 South Norfolk Council election took place on 3 May 2007 to elect members of South Norfolk District Council in England. This was on the same day as other local elections.

== Election result ==
2007 South Norfolk District Council election
Party	Seats	Gains	Losses	Net gain/loss	Seats %	Votes %	Votes	+/−
Conservative	39			▲21	84.8	55.1	31,126	+14.5
Liberal Democrats	7			▼21	15.2	39.2	22,139	-7.8
Green	0			0	0.0	2.7	1,533	+0.2
Labour	0			0	0.0	2.1	1,189	-5.3
Independent	0			0	0.0	0.3	197	-2.2
UKIP	0			0	0.0	0.3	193	New
English Democrat	0			0	0.0	0.2	136	New
