= 2003 South Norfolk District Council election =

South Norfolk District Council election

Results of the 2003 South Norfolk District Council election

The 2003 South Norfolk Council election took place on 1 May 2003 to elect members of South Norfolk District Council in England. This was on the same day as other local elections.

== Election result ==
2003 South Norfolk District Council election
Party	Seats	Gains	Losses	Net gain/loss	Seats %	Votes %	Votes	+/−
Liberal Democrats	28			▲1	60.9	47.0	22,188	+2.0
Conservative	18			▲2	39.1	40.6	19,183	+5.6
Labour	0			▼2	0.0	7.4	3,481	-8.5
Green	0			0	0.0	2.5	1,194	+2.2
Independent	0			▼2	0.0	2.5	1,176	-1.4

== By-elections ==
Easton By-Election 16 September 2004
Party	Candidate	Votes	%	±%
Conservative	Margaret Dewsbury	500	57.1	+3.7
Liberal Democrats	Paul Blathwayt	336	38.4	+10.2
Green	Andrew Brockbank	40	4.6	−2.6
Majority		164	18.7	
Turnout		876	45.9	
Conservative hold		Swing		

Diss By-Election 15 June 2006
Party	Candidate	Votes	%	±%
Conservative	Anthony Palmer	845	50.9	+25.5
Liberal Democrats	Susan Ayres	714	43.0	+2.9
Green	Graham Sessions	102	6.1	+6.1
Majority		131	7.9	
Turnout		1,661	29.6	
Liberal Democrats hold		Swing		
