= 1991 South Norfolk District Council election =

1991 English local government election

- 2 May 1991

All 47 seats to South Norfolk District Council 24 seats needed for a majority

	First party	Second party	Third party
Party	Conservative	Liberal Democrats	Independent
Seats won	23	20	4
Seat change	Steady	▲4	▼4
Popular vote	20,684	22,672	2,747
Percentage	37.8%	41.5%	5.0%
Swing	▲1.5%	▲0.1%	▼7.6%
- Winner of each seat at the 1991 South Norfolk District Council election.
Control before election
No overall control
Control after election
No overall control

The 1991 South Norfolk District Council election took place on 2 May 1991 to elect members of South Norfolk District Council in Norfolk, England. This was on the same day as other local elections.

== Summary ==
=== Election result ===
1991 South Norfolk District Council election
Party	Candidates	Seats	Gains	Losses	Net gain/loss	Seats %	Votes %	Votes	+/−
Conservative	44	23	5	5	Steady	48.9	37.8	20,684	+1.5
Liberal Democrats	43	20	5	1	▲4	42.6	41.5	22,672	+0.1
Independent	5	4	1	5	▼4	8.5	5.0	2,747	–7.6
Labour	47	0	0	0	Steady	0.0	15.4	8,436	+5.7
Green	2	0	0	0	Steady	0.0	0.3	152	N/A

== Ward results ==
Incumbent councillors standing for re-election are marked with an asterisk (*). Changes in seats do not take into account by-elections or defections.

=== Abbey ===
Abbey
Party	Candidate	Votes	%	±%
Liberal Democrats	K. Body	467	51.4	
Conservative	P. Colby	255	28.1	
Labour	A. Clough	186	20.5	
Majority		212	23.3	
Turnout		908	55.0	
Registered electors		1,674		
Liberal Democrats gain from Conservative		Swing		

=== Abbeyfield ===
Abbeyfield
Party	Candidate	Votes	%	±%
Independent	B. Clarke*	516	71.9	
Labour	W. McCloughan	202	28.1	
Majority		314	43.7	
Turnout		718	51.5	
Registered electors		1,399		
Independent hold		Swing		

=== Beauchamp ===
Beauchamp
Party	Candidate	Votes	%	±%
Conservative	A. Hawthorne	432	55.9	
Labour	G. Brewster	171	22.1	
Liberal Democrats	C. Harris	170	22.0	
Majority		261	33.8	
Turnout		773	52.5	
Registered electors		1,476		
Conservative hold		Swing		

=== Beck Vale ===
Beck Vale
Party	Candidate	Votes	%	±%
Liberal Democrats	J. Rawlence*	730	67.4	
Conservative	A. Alexander	280	25.9	
Labour	B. Ziolkowska	73	6.7	
Majority		450	41.6	
Turnout		1,083	66.8	
Registered electors		1,620		
Liberal Democrats hold		Swing		

=== Beckhithe ===
Beckhithe (2 seats)
Party	Candidate	Votes	%	±%
Conservative	P. Bond	973	46.1	
Conservative	J. Jacklin	874	41.4	
Liberal Democrats	F. Watkins	779	36.9	
Liberal Democrats	J. Penn	718	34.0	
Labour	D. Clennell	337	16.0	
Labour	J. Craythorne	310	14.7	
Turnout		~2,112	50.7	
Registered electors		4,166		
Conservative gain from Independent				
Conservative gain from Independent				

=== Berners ===
Berners
Party	Candidate	Votes	%	±%
Conservative	R. Tilbrook*	539	53.7	
Liberal Democrats	C. Savage	378	37.6	
Labour	J. Watt	87	8.7	
Majority		161	16.0	
Turnout		1,004	56.0	
Registered electors		1,786		
Conservative gain from Independent		Swing		

=== Boyland ===
Boyland
Party	Candidate	Votes	%	±%
Conservative	E. Lines*	566	58.6	
Liberal Democrats	G. Green	227	23.5	
Labour	P. Dudley	173	17.9	
Majority		339	35.1	
Turnout		966	48.7	
Registered electors		2,002		
Conservative gain from Independent		Swing		

=== Broads ===
Broads
Party	Candidate	Votes	%	±%
Conservative	S. Knollys*	536	64.0	
Labour	J. Hinchliffe	109	13.0	
Liberal Democrats	P. Newell	100	11.9	
Green	S. Ross-Wagenknecat	93	11.1	
Majority		427	51.0	
Turnout		838	57.5	
Registered electors		1,456		
Conservative hold		Swing		

=== Brookwood ===
Brookwood
Party	Candidate	Votes	%	±%
Conservative	K. Warman*	503	55.6	
Liberal Democrats	M. Last	250	27.7	
Labour	I. Lochhead	151	16.7	
Majority		253	28.0	
Turnout		904	53.6	
Registered electors		1,684		
Conservative hold		Swing		

=== Chet ===
Chet
Party	Candidate	Votes	%	±%
Conservative	A. Young	538	52.9	
Labour	R. Ford	343	33.7	
Liberal Democrats	P. Matthew	136	13.4	
Majority		195	19.2	
Turnout		1,017	52.2	
Registered electors		1,948		
Conservative hold		Swing		

=== Clavering ===
Clavering
Party	Candidate	Votes	%	±%
Independent	K. Morgan*	555	61.4	
Liberal Democrats	M. Cooke	257	28.4	
Labour	R. Kelsey	92	10.2	
Majority		298	33.0	
Turnout		904	51.2	
Registered electors		1,778		
Independent hold		Swing		

=== Cringleford & Colney ===
Cringleford & Colney
Party	Candidate	Votes	%	±%
Conservative	K. Rowe	614	60.4	
Liberal Democrats	W. Smith	345	33.9	
Labour	T. Wilson	58	5.7	
Majority		269	26.5	
Turnout		1,017	57.3	
Registered electors		1,780		
Conservative hold		Swing		

=== Cromwells ===
Cromwells
Party	Candidate	Votes	%	±%
Liberal Democrats	D. Hockaday*	465	60.4	
Conservative	P. Tonkin	165	21.4	
Labour	C. Brett	140	18.2	
Majority		300	39.0	
Turnout		770	56.9	
Registered electors		1,372		
Liberal Democrats hold		Swing		

=== Crown Point ===
Crown Point
Party	Candidate	Votes	%	±%
Conservative	R. Smith	227	44.7	
Labour	H. Bedford	145	28.5	
Liberal Democrats	J. Pitchford	136	26.8	
Majority		82	16.1	
Turnout		508	51.7	
Registered electors		981		
Conservative gain from Liberal Democrats		Swing		

=== Dickleburgh ===
Dickleburgh
Party	Candidate	Votes	%	±%
Conservative	V. Richardson	324	44.3	
Liberal Democrats	P. Rye	278	38.0	
Labour	S. Davies	130	17.8	
Majority		46	6.3	
Turnout		732	55.2	
Registered electors		1,325		
Conservative hold		Swing		

=== Diss ===
Diss (3 seats)
Party	Candidate	Votes	%	±%
Liberal Democrats	I. Jacoby*	1,323	58.9	
Liberal Democrats	J. Caldwell	1,244	55.4	
Independent	R. Hopgood*	898	40.0	
Conservative	J. Leeder	628	28.0	
Conservative	M. O'Connell	491	21.9	
Independent	S. Kitchen	464	20.7	
Labour	L. Bates	261	11.6	
Labour	J. Philip	245	10.9	
Labour	V. Root	199	8.9	
Turnout		~2,246	43.0	
Registered electors		5,223		
Liberal Democrats hold				
Liberal Democrats hold				
Independent hold				

=== Ditchingham ===
Ditchingham
Party	Candidate	Votes	%	±%
Liberal Democrats	R. Hadman	534	49.9	
Conservative	J. Kerr	337	31.5	
Labour	J. McKie	200	18.7	
Majority		197	18.4	
Turnout		1,071	62.0	
Registered electors		1,729		
Liberal Democrats hold		Swing		

=== Forehoe ===
Forehoe
Party	Candidate	Votes	%	±%
Conservative	S. Orton	367	49.5	
Liberal Democrats	F. Barrow	233	31.4	
Labour	L. Coleman	141	19.0	
Majority		134	18.1	
Turnout		741	48.5	
Registered electors		1,545		
Conservative hold		Swing		

=== Harleston ===
Harleston
Party	Candidate	Votes	%	±%
Liberal Democrats	S. Taylor*	956	62.6	
Conservative	M. Turbin	440	28.8	
Labour	M. Flatman	131	8.6	
Majority		516	33.8	
Turnout		1,527	52.7	
Registered electors		2,907		
Liberal Democrats hold		Swing		

=== Hempnall ===
Hempnall
Party	Candidate	Votes	%	±%
Liberal Democrats	S. Beare	557	60.8	
Conservative	A. Latoy	324	35.4	
Labour	J. Holtom	35	3.8	
Majority		233	25.4	
Turnout		916	63.0	
Registered electors		1,458		
Liberal Democrats gain from Conservative		Swing		

=== Hingham ===
Hingham
Party	Candidate	Votes	%	±%
Liberal Democrats	P. Dore*	569	57.4	
Conservative	D. Burt	359	36.2	
Labour	P. Eldridge	63	6.4	
Majority		210	21.2	
Turnout		991	60.6	
Registered electors		1,621		
Liberal Democrats hold		Swing		

=== Humbleyard ===
Humbleyard
Party	Candidate	Votes	%	±%
Independent	D. Lishman	314	47.8	
Conservative	R. Turner*	287	43.7	
Labour	S. Sewell	56	8.5	
Majority		27	4.1	
Turnout		657	52.0	
Registered electors		1,266		
Independent gain from Conservative		Swing		

=== Kidner ===
Kidner
Party	Candidate	Votes	%	±%
Conservative	M. Tomlinson*	469	45.8	
Liberal Democrats	B. Singleton	443	43.3	
Labour	I. Boreham	111	10.9	
Majority		26	2.5	
Turnout		1,023	66.8	
Registered electors		1,532		
Conservative hold		Swing		

=== Long Row ===
Long Row
Party	Candidate	Votes	%	±%
Conservative	D. Mitchell	367	41.8	
Labour	D. Zeichner	292	33.3	
Liberal Democrats	I. Caldwell	219	24.9	
Majority		75	8.5	
Turnout		878	57.7	
Registered electors		1,524		
Conservative hold		Swing		

=== Marshland ===
Marshland
Party	Candidate	Votes	%	±%
Liberal Democrats	E. Playle*	351	44.7	
Labour	E. Rochford	219	27.9	
Conservative	T. Browne	215	27.4	
Majority		132	16.8	
Turnout		785	56.6	
Registered electors		1,394		
Liberal Democrats hold		Swing		

=== Mergate ===
Mergate
Party	Candidate	Votes	%	±%
Conservative	M. Hardy*	695	57.0	
Labour	D. Higgin	524	43.0	
Majority		171	14.0	
Turnout		1,219	43.0	
Registered electors		2,869		
Conservative hold		Swing		

=== New Costessey ===
New Costessey (2 seats)
Party	Candidate	Votes	%	±%
Liberal Democrats	R. Piesse	908	48.8	
Liberal Democrats	W. Dinneen	886	47.6	
Conservative	D. Hill	638	34.3	
Conservative	D. Whiskerd	590	31.7	
Labour	G. Creissen	278	14.9	
Labour	G. Malin	271	14.6	
Turnout		~1,861	51.8	
Registered electors		3,593		
Liberal Democrats hold				
Liberal Democrats hold				

=== Northfields ===
Northfields
Party	Candidate	Votes	%	±%
Conservative	J. Mooney	367	38.2	
Liberal Democrats	K. McClure	302	31.4	
Labour	P. Nicholls	292	30.4	
Majority		65	6.8	
Turnout		961	51.7	
Registered electors		1,897		
Conservative hold		Swing		

=== Old Costessey ===
Old Costessey (2 seats)
Party	Candidate	Votes	%	±%
Liberal Democrats	K. Rogers*	1,267	57.1	
Liberal Democrats	T. East*	1,263	56.9	
Conservative	P. Battley	795	35.8	
Conservative	B. Vail	631	28.4	
Labour	J. Cullum	207	9.3	
Labour	S. Button	203	9.1	
Turnout		~2,219	51.5	
Registered electors		4,308		
Liberal Democrats hold				
Liberal Democrats hold				

=== Poringland With The Framinghams ===
Poringland With The Framinghams (2 seats)
Party	Candidate	Votes	%	±%
Conservative	G. Hemming*	784	44.2	
Conservative	D. Maidstone	702	39.6	
Liberal Democrats	J. Tryggvason	704	39.7	
Liberal Democrats	F. Hurrell	685	38.6	
Labour	J. Huxtable	247	13.9	
Labour	R. Cottey	224	12.6	
Turnout		~1,773	55.9	
Registered electors		3,169		
Conservative hold				
Conservative hold				

=== Rustens ===
Rustens
Party	Candidate	Votes	%	±%
Conservative	J. Barnard*	465	48.9	
Labour	T. Ransom	279	29.3	
Liberal Democrats	D. Fairbairn	207	21.8	
Majority		186	19.6	
Turnout		951	43.4	
Registered electors		2,234		
Conservative hold		Swing		

=== Scole ===
Scole
Party	Candidate	Votes	%	±%
Conservative	V. Alexander*	519	56.0	
Liberal Democrats	L. Sandeman	206	22.2	
Labour	I. Stebbing	142	15.3	
Green	G. Sessions	59	6.4	
Majority		313	33.8	
Turnout		926	52.5	
Registered electors		1,768		
Conservative hold		Swing		

=== Smockmill ===
Smockmill
Party	Candidate	Votes	%	±%
Liberal Democrats	J. Peterson*	672	62.2	
Conservative	P. Howarth	330	30.5	
Labour	T. Sanders	79	7.3	
Majority		342	31.6	
Turnout		1,081	59.9	
Registered electors		1,809		
Liberal Democrats gain from Independent		Swing		

=== Springfields ===
Springfields
Party	Candidate	Votes	%	±%
Conservative	J. Easton*	349	57.0	
Liberal Democrats	C. Bunting	154	25.2	
Labour	J. Chamberlain	109	17.8	
Majority		195	31.9	
Turnout		612	51.0	
Registered electors		1,200		
Conservative hold		Swing		

=== Stratton ===
Stratton
Party	Candidate	Votes	%	±%
Liberal Democrats	P. Smith*	809	67.6	
Conservative	M. Wilson	304	25.4	
Labour	B. Whall	83	6.9	
Majority		505	42.2	
Turnout		1,196	52.6	
Registered electors		2,276		
Liberal Democrats hold		Swing		

=== Tasvale ===
Tasvale
Party	Candidate	Votes	%	±%
Liberal Democrats	P. Bradshaw*	745	65.0	
Conservative	F. Bright	297	25.9	
Labour	J. King	104	9.1	
Majority		448	39.1	
Turnout		1,146	66.4	
Registered electors		1,729		
Liberal Democrats hold		Swing		

=== Town ===
Town
Party	Candidate	Votes	%	±%
Liberal Democrats	A. Cousins	331	41.2	
Conservative	D. Johnson	244	30.4	
Labour	C. Greengrass	228	28.4	
Majority		87	10.8	
Turnout		803	51.5	
Registered electors		1,586		
Liberal Democrats hold		Swing		

=== Valley ===
Valley
Party	Candidate	Votes	%	±%
Liberal Democrats	M. Gray	622	57.1	
Conservative	J. Scott*	384	35.3	
Labour	R. McKie	83	7.6	
Majority		238	21.9	
Turnout		1,089	66.5	
Registered electors		1,641		
Liberal Democrats gain from Conservative		Swing		

=== Waveney ===
Waveney
Party	Candidate	Votes	%	±%
Liberal Democrats	F. Mitchell	435	47.0	
Conservative	J. Ashfield	383	41.4	
Labour	B. Falkner	107	11.6	
Majority		52	5.6	
Turnout		925	61.9	
Registered electors		1,508		
Liberal Democrats gain from Conservative		Swing		

=== Westwood ===
Westwood
Party	Candidate	Votes	%	±%
Conservative	N. Chapman*	722	53.0	
Liberal Democrats	R. McClenning	437	32.1	
Labour	S. Blaikie	202	14.8	
Majority		285	20.9	
Turnout		1,361	57.1	
Registered electors		2,396		
Conservative hold		Swing		

=== Wodehouse ===
Wodehouse
Party	Candidate	Votes	%	±%
Conservative	M. Dewsbury	375	56.6	
Liberal Democrats	P. Blathwayt	174	26.2	
Labour	A. Cordial	114	17.2	
Majority		201	30.3	
Turnout		663	54.0	
Registered electors		1,244		
Conservative hold		Swing		
