= 1983 South Norfolk District Council election =

1983 English local election

- 5 May 1983

All 47 seats to South Norfolk District Council 24 seats needed for a majority

	First party	Second party	Third party
Party	Conservative	Independent	Alliance
Seats won	34	6	5
Seat change	▲3	▼6	▲4
Popular vote	18,910	3,793	12,429
Percentage	45.2%	9.1%	29.7%
Swing	▼0.8%	▼13.5%	▲24.9%
	Fourth party	Fifth party
Party	Labour	Ind. Conservative
Seats won	1	1
Seat change	▼1	Steady
Popular vote	6,226	482
Percentage	14.9%	1.2%
Swing	▼11.7%	N/A
- Winner of each seat at the 1983 South Norfolk District Council election.
Control before election
Conservative
Control after election
Conservative

The 1983 South Norfolk District Council election took place on 5 May 1983 to elect members of South Norfolk District Council in Norfolk, England. This was on the same day as other local elections.

== Summary ==
=== Election result ===
1983 South Norfolk District Council election
Party	Candidates	Seats	Gains	Losses	Net gain/loss	Seats %	Votes %	Votes	+/−
Conservative	41	34	7	4	▲3	72.3	45.2	18,910	–0.8
Independent	6	6	0	6	▼6	12.8	9.1	3,793	–13.5
Alliance	41	5	4	0	▲4	10.6	29.7	12,429	+24.9
Labour	38	1	0	1	▼1	2.1	14.9	6,226	–11.7
Ind. Conservative	1	1	1	1	Steady	2.1	1.2	482	N/A

== Ward results ==
Incumbent councillors standing for re-election are marked with an asterisk (*). Changes in seats do not take into account by-elections or defections.

=== Abbey ===
Abbey
Party	Candidate	Votes	%	±%
Conservative	T. Turner*	343	44.5	
Alliance	D. Cudby	303	39.4	
Labour	J. Drewitt	124	16.1	
Majority		40	5.2	
Turnout		770	57.0	
Registered electors		1,387		
Conservative hold		Swing		

=== Abbeyfield ===
Abbeyfield
Party	Candidate	Votes	%	±%
Independent	J. Birkett-Stubbs*	327	52.9	
Labour	J. Skilleter	188	30.4	
Alliance	G. Southernwood	103	16.7	
Majority		139	22.5	
Turnout		618	46.0	
Registered electors		1,383		
Independent hold		Swing		

=== Beauchamp ===
Beauchamp
Party	Candidate	Votes	%	±%
Conservative	J. Howlett	414	52.5	
Alliance	J. Boardman	292	37.1	
Labour	J. Lester	82	10.4	
Majority		122	15.5	
Turnout		788	59.0	
Registered electors		1,356		
Conservative gain from Independent		Swing		

=== Beck Vale ===
Beck Vale
Party	Candidate	Votes	%	±%
Alliance	J. Rawlence	478	53.4	
Conservative	W. Tyler	417	46.6	
Majority		61	6.8	
Turnout		895	55.0	
Registered electors		1,607		
Alliance gain from Conservative		Swing		

=== Beckhithe ===
Beckhithe (2 seats)
Party	Candidate	Votes	%	±%
Independent	D. Pigg	980	64.0	
Independent	H. Back*	881	57.5	
Alliance	F. Watkins	252	16.4	
Labour	D. Clenell	249	16.3	
Labour	T. Clenell	221	14.4	
Alliance	C. Parker	155	10.1	
Turnout		~1,532	42.0	
Registered electors		3,648		
Independent hold				
Independent hold				

=== Berners ===
Berners
Party	Candidate	Votes	%	±%
Conservative	R. Tilbrook*	667	79.7	
Alliance	R. Buck	170	20.3	
Majority		497	59.4	
Turnout		837	53.0	
Registered electors		1,634		
Conservative gain from Ind. Conservative		Swing		

=== Boyland ===
Boyland
Party	Candidate	Votes	%	±%
Ind. Conservative	E. Lines	482	66.9	
Alliance	A. Ross	238	33.1	
Majority		244	33.9	
Turnout		720	39.0	
Registered electors		1,854		
Ind. Conservative gain from Independent		Swing		

=== Broads ===
Broads
Party	Candidate	Votes	%	±%
Conservative	S. Knollys	479	70.1	
Alliance	T. Howlett	123	18.0	
Labour	R. Kelsey	81	11.9	
Majority		356	52.1	
Turnout		683	49.0	
Registered electors		1,387		
Conservative hold		Swing		

=== Brookwood ===
Brookwood
Party	Candidate	Votes	%	±%
Conservative	K. Warman	606	64.5	
Alliance	S. Revell	173	18.4	
Labour	B. Sanders	160	17.0	
Majority		433	46.1	
Turnout		939	57.0	
Registered electors		1,625		
Conservative hold		Swing		

=== Chet ===
Chet
Party	Candidate	Votes	%	±%
Conservative	W. Hemmant*	434	65.2	
Alliance	T. Wells	117	17.6	
Labour	M. Tabeart	115	17.3	
Majority		317	47.6	
Turnout		666	48.0	
Registered electors		1,622		
Conservative gain from Independent		Swing		

=== Clavering ===
Clavering
Party	Candidate	Votes	%	±%
Conservative	K. Morgan	Unopposed		
Registered electors		1,691		
Conservative hold				

=== Cringleford & Colney ===
Cringleford & Colney
Party	Candidate	Votes	%	±%
Conservative	J. Mackew	720	79.8	
Alliance	P. Bradshaw	127	14.1	
Labour	S. Hatfield	55	6.1	
Majority		593	65.7	
Turnout		902	55.0	
Registered electors		1,672		
Conservative hold		Swing		

=== Cromwells ===
Cromwells
Party	Candidate	Votes	%	±%
Conservative	P. Tonkin	320	41.4	
Labour	B. Francis	239	30.9	
Alliance	P. Smith	214	27.7	
Majority		81	10.5	
Turnout		773	58.0	
Registered electors		1,378		
Conservative gain from Labour		Swing		

=== Crown Point ===
Crown Point
Party	Candidate	Votes	%	±%
Conservative	J. Ridley-Thomas*	244	47.8	
Labour	E. Hale	159	31.2	
Alliance	J. Pitchford	107	21.0	
Majority		85	16.7	
Turnout		510	51.0	
Registered electors		1,000		
Conservative hold		Swing		

=== Dickleburgh ===
Dickleburgh
Party	Candidate	Votes	%	±%
Conservative	F. Clark	455	62.4	
Alliance	P. Withers	274	37.6	
Majority		181	24.8	
Turnout		729	56.0	
Registered electors		1,326		
Conservative hold		Swing		

=== Diss ===
Diss (3 seats)
Party	Candidate	Votes	%	±%
Conservative	S. Kitchen	763	52.4	
Conservative	J. Scoggins*	739	50.8	
Conservative	D. Bell*	734	50.4	
Alliance	P. Norfolk	448	30.8	
Alliance	I. Jacoby	367	25.2	
Labour	J. Davies	290	19.9	
Alliance	D. Cassey	265	18.2	
Labour	F. Davies	252	17.3	
Turnout		~1,456	33.0	
Registered electors		4,413		
Conservative gain from Independent				
Conservative hold				
Conservative hold				

=== Ditchingham ===
Ditchingham
Party	Candidate	Votes	%	±%
Conservative	S. Summerfield*	432	46.3	
Alliance	J. Cooper	398	42.6	
Labour	S. Browne	104	11.1	
Majority		34	3.6	
Turnout		934	62.0	
Registered electors		1,578		
Conservative hold		Swing		

=== Forehoe ===
Forehoe
Party	Candidate	Votes	%	±%
Conservative	B. Cook*	458	68.8	
Labour	G. Williams	106	15.9	
Alliance	A. Prynne	102	15.3	
Majority		352	52.9	
Turnout		666	48.0	
Registered electors		1,473		
Conservative hold		Swing		

=== Harleston ===
Harleston
Party	Candidate	Votes	%	±%
Alliance	S. Burton*	734	53.6	
Conservative	J. Mortimer	536	39.1	
Labour	A. Todd	100	7.3	
Majority		198	14.5	
Turnout		1,370	59.0	
Registered electors		2,376		
Alliance hold		Swing		

=== Hempnall ===
Hempnall
Party	Candidate	Votes	%	±%
Conservative	H. Sargent*	462	73.1	
Alliance	J. Halliday	106	16.8	
Labour	I. Warshaw	64	10.1	
Majority		356	56.3	
Turnout		632	47.0	
Registered electors		1,361		
Conservative hold		Swing		

=== Hingham ===
Hingham
Party	Candidate	Votes	%	±%
Alliance	J. Golden	391	44.4	
Conservative	H. Holman*	368	41.8	
Labour	P. Eldridge	122	13.8	
Majority		23	2.6	
Turnout		881	59.0	
Registered electors		1,521		
Alliance gain from Conservative		Swing		

=== Humbleyard ===
Humbleyard
Party	Candidate	Votes	%	±%
Conservative	R. Turner	374	72.2	
Labour	E. Williams	84	16.2	
Alliance	M. Parkinson	60	11.6	
Majority		290	56.0	
Turnout		518	51.0	
Registered electors		1,029		
Conservative hold		Swing		

=== Kidner ===
Kidner
Party	Candidate	Votes	%	±%
Conservative	A. Gill	406	66.1	
Labour	M. Colk	208	33.9	
Majority		198	32.2	
Turnout		614	43.0	
Registered electors		1,448		
Conservative gain from Independent		Swing		

=== Long Row ===
Long Row
Party	Candidate	Votes	%	±%
Independent	T. Potter*	448	54.6	
Conservative	F. Mullender	372	45.4	
Majority		76	9.3	
Turnout		820	59.0	
Registered electors		1,407		
Independent hold		Swing		

=== Marshland ===
Marshland
Party	Candidate	Votes	%	±%
Labour	E. Rochford*	265	35.9	
Alliance	W. Batten	253	34.3	
Conservative	I. Finch	220	29.8	
Majority		12	1.6	
Turnout		738	55.2	
Registered electors		1,341		
Labour hold		Swing		

=== Mergate ===
Mergate
Party	Candidate	Votes	%	±%
Independent	P. Mickleburgh*	754	78.2	
Labour	W. Niblo	210	21.8	
Majority		544	56.4	
Turnout		964	39.0	
Registered electors		2,476		
Independent hold		Swing		

=== New Costessey ===
New Costessey (2 seats)
Party	Candidate	Votes	%	±%
Conservative	G. Evans*	601	37.5	
Conservative	A. Moorhouse*	578	36.1	
Alliance	R. Piesse	507	31.6	
Alliance	D. Garrod	439	27.4	
Labour	S. Button	328	20.5	
Labour	H. Gascoyne	320	20.0	
Turnout		~1,603	45.0	
Registered electors		3,562		
Conservative hold				
Conservative hold				

=== Northfields ===
Northfields
Party	Candidate	Votes	%	±%
Conservative	B. Partridge*	308	45.2	
Labour	K. Drewitt	236	34.6	
Alliance	W. Macdonald	138	20.2	
Majority		72	10.6	
Turnout		682	46.0	
Registered electors		1,510		
Conservative hold		Swing		

=== Old Costessey ===
Old Costessey (2 seats)
Party	Candidate	Votes	%	±%
Alliance	T. East	1,060	54.2	
Conservative	D. Hill	728	37.2	
Alliance	T. Jones	717	36.7	
Conservative	D. Whiskerd*	623	31.9	
Labour	D. White-Miller	173	8.8	
Labour	I. Button	119	6.1	
Turnout		~1,955	52.0	
Registered electors		3,760		
Alliance gain from Conservative				
Conservative hold				

=== Poringland With The Framinghams ===
Poringland With The Framinghams (2 seats)
Party	Candidate	Votes	%	±%
Conservative	R. Sykes*	911	54.6	
Conservative	R. Overton	745	44.7	
Alliance	J. Pitchford	465	27.9	
Alliance	P. Corney	329	19.7	
Labour	L. Pugh	246	14.8	
Labour	R. Cottey	207	12.4	
Turnout		~1,667	61.0	
Registered electors		2,732		
Conservative hold				
Conservative hold				

=== Rustens ===
Rustens
Party	Candidate	Votes	%	±%
Conservative	L. Storey	492	55.7	
Alliance	R. Edwards	203	23.0	
Labour	A. Morrison	189	21.4	
Majority		289	32.7	
Turnout		884	46.0	
Registered electors		1,976		
Conservative hold		Swing		

=== Scole ===
Scole
Party	Candidate	Votes	%	±%
Conservative	V. Alexander*	502	51.1	
Alliance	D. Caldwell	446	45.4	
Labour	D. Ketteringham	35	3.6	
Majority		56	5.7	
Turnout		983	64.0	
Registered electors		1,537		
Conservative hold		Swing		

=== Smockmill ===
Smockmill
Party	Candidate	Votes	%	±%
Independent	A. King*	403	53.3	
Alliance	W. Bouchard	255	33.7	
Labour	D. Pugh	98	13.0	
Majority		148	19.6	
Turnout		756	43.0	
Registered electors		1,779		
Independent hold		Swing		

=== Springfields ===
Springfields
Party	Candidate	Votes	%	±%
Conservative	J. Easton*	Unopposed		
Registered electors		1,155		
Conservative hold				

=== Stratton ===
Stratton
Party	Candidate	Votes	%	±%
Conservative	P. Phillips*	367	43.8	
Alliance	J. Elsworth	341	40.7	
Labour	E. Parker	130	15.5	
Majority		26	3.1	
Turnout		838	44.0	
Registered electors		1,906		
Conservative hold		Swing		

=== Tasvale ===
Tasvale
Party	Candidate	Votes	%	±%
Conservative	P. Ayers	499	57.8	
Alliance	J. Bullent	214	24.8	
Labour	E. Sabberton	151	17.5	
Majority		285	33.0	
Turnout		864	53.0	
Registered electors		1,646		
Conservative hold		Swing		

=== Town ===
Town
Party	Candidate	Votes	%	±%
Alliance	S. Buckton	333	40.3	
Conservative	E. Capps*	276	33.4	
Labour	J. Chamberlain	218	26.4	
Majority		57	6.9	
Turnout		827	55.0	
Registered electors		1,549		
Alliance gain from Conservative		Swing		

=== Valley ===
Valley
Party	Candidate	Votes	%	±%
Conservative	C. Steel*	399	44.3	
Alliance	H. Pagan	376	41.8	
Labour	C. Todd	125	13.9	
Majority		23	2.6	
Turnout		900	56.0	
Registered electors		1,627		
Conservative hold		Swing		

=== Waveney ===
Waveney
Party	Candidate	Votes	%	±%
Conservative	M. Martin*	491	57.6	
Alliance	A. Spillane	277	32.5	
Labour	H. Kelsey	85	10.0	
Majority		214	25.1	
Turnout		853	59.0	
Registered electors		1,468		
Conservative hold		Swing		

=== Westwood ===
Westwood
Party	Candidate	Votes	%	±%
Conservative	N. Chapman*	Unopposed		
Registered electors		2,107		
Conservative gain from Independent				

=== Wodehouse ===
Wodehouse
Party	Candidate	Votes	%	±%
Conservative	A. Cook*	427	71.9	
Labour	W. Jervis	88	14.8	
Alliance	A. Day	79	13.3	
Majority		339	57.1	
Turnout		594	49.0	
Registered electors		1,218		
Conservative hold		Swing		

== By-elections ==
=== Long Row ===
Long Row by-election: 7 November 1985
Party	Candidate	Votes	%	±%
Conservative		314	41.4	
Liberal		186	24.5	
Labour		156	20.6	
Independent		102	13.5	
Majority		128	16.9	
Turnout		758	52.0	
Registered electors		1,458		
Conservative gain from Independent		Swing		
