= 1979 South Norfolk District Council election =

1979 English UK local government election

- 3 May 1979

All 47 seats to South Norfolk District Council 24 seats needed for a majority

	First party	Second party	Third party
Party	Conservative	Independent	Labour
Seats won	31	12	2
Seat change	▲8	▼9	▲2
Popular vote	21,329	10,477	12,319
Percentage	46.0%	22.6%	26.6%
Swing	▲1.4%	▲1.0%	▼0.3%
	Fourth party	Fifth party
Party	Liberal	Ind. Conservative
Seats won	1	1
Seat change	▼1	Steady
Popular vote	2,231	Unopposed
Percentage	4.8%	Unopposed
Swing	▼0.7%	▼1.0%
Control before election
No overall control
Control after election
Conservative

The 1979 South Norfolk District Council election took place on 3 May 1979 to elect members of South Norfolk District Council in Norfolk, England. This was on the same day as the 1979 general election and other local elections.

The council was contested on new ward boundaries, but the number of seats remained the same.

== Summary ==
=== Election result ===
1979 South Norfolk District Council election
Party	Candidates	Seats	Gains	Losses	Net gain/loss	Seats %	Votes %	Votes	+/−
Conservative	37	31	N/A	N/A	▲8	66.0	46.0	21,329	+1.4
Independent	14	12	N/A	N/A	▼9	25.5	22.6	10,477	+1.0
Labour	25	2	N/A	N/A	▲2	4.3	26.6	12,319	–0.3
Liberal	3	1	N/A	N/A	▼1	2.1	4.8	2,231	–0.7
Ind. Conservative	1	1	N/A	N/A	Steady	1.8	N/A	N/A	–1.0

== Ward results ==
Incumbent councillors standing for re-election are marked with an asterisk (*). Changes in seats do not take into account by-elections or defections.

=== Abbey ===
Abbey
Party	Candidate	Votes	%
Conservative	T. Turner*	676	62.5
Labour	E. Parker	405	37.5
Majority		271	25.1
Turnout		1,081	80.8
Registered electors		1,338	
Conservative win (new seat)			

=== Abbeyfield ===
Abbeyfield
Party	Candidate	Votes	%	±%
Independent	J. Birkett-Stubbs*	544	53.4	
Conservative	F. Halls	475	46.6	
Majority		69	6.8	
Turnout		1,019	75.3	
Registered electors		1,354		
Independent hold		Swing		

=== Beauchamp ===
Beauchamp
Party	Candidate	Votes	%
Independent	L. Lester*	Unopposed	
Registered electors		1,293	
Independent win (new seat)			

=== Beck Vale ===
Beck Vale
Party	Candidate	Votes	%	±%
Conservative	P. Smoothy*	Unopposed		
Registered electors		1,566		
Conservative gain from Independent				

=== Beckhithe ===
Beckhithe (2 seats)
Party	Candidate	Votes	%	±%
Independent	H. Back*	1,805	67.6	
Independent	K. Wiles*	1,117	41.8	
Labour	D. Clennell	865	32.4	
Labour	M. Dicks	815	30.5	
Turnout		~2,671	77.5	
Registered electors		3,447		
Independent hold				
Independent hold				

=== Berners ===
Berners
Party	Candidate	Votes	%	±%
Ind. Conservative	R. Tillbrook*	Unopposed		
Registered electors		1,514		
Ind. Conservative hold				

=== Boyland ===
Boyland
Party	Candidate	Votes	%	±%
Independent	B. Gaze*	Unopposed		
Registered electors		1,787		
Independent hold				

=== Broads ===
Broads
Party	Candidate	Votes	%
Conservative	P. Arnold	Unopposed	
Registered electors		1,326	
Conservative win (new seat)			

=== Brookwood ===
Brookwood
Party	Candidate	Votes	%	±%
Conservative	A. Anderson*	Unopposed		
Registered electors		1,569		
Conservative hold				

=== Chet ===
Chet
Party	Candidate	Votes	%	±%
Independent	W. Hemmant*	Unopposed		
Registered electors		1,509		
Independent hold				

=== Clavering ===
Clavering
Party	Candidate	Votes	%	±%
Conservative	G. Harris*	657	56.3	
Labour	C. Love	510	43.7	
Majority		147	12.6	
Turnout		1,167	74.6	
Registered electors		1,565		
Conservative gain from Independent		Swing		

=== Cringleford & Colney ===
Cringleford & Colney
Party	Candidate	Votes	%	±%
Conservative	J. Aikens*	1,126	87.4	
Labour	R. James	163	12.6	
Majority		963	74.7	
Turnout		1,289	84.5	
Registered electors		1,525		
Conservative gain from Independent		Swing		

=== Cromwells ===
Cromwells
Party	Candidate	Votes	%
Labour	J. Chamberlain	512	50.2
Conservative	P. Ford	508	49.8
Majority		4	0.4
Turnout		1,020	75.2
Registered electors		1,357	
Labour win (new seat)			

=== Crown Point ===
Crown Point
Party	Candidate	Votes	%	±%
Conservative	J. Ridley-Thomas*	Unopposed		
Registered electors		1,002		
Conservative hold				

=== Dickleburgh ===
Dickleburgh
Party	Candidate	Votes	%	±%
Conservative	M. Philpot	Unopposed		
Registered electors		1,202		
Conservative gain from Independent				

=== Diss ===
Diss (3 seats)
Party	Candidate	Votes	%	±%
Conservative	D. Bell*	1,586	70.0	
Conservative	J. Scoggins*	1,537	67.8	
Independent	J. Speirs*	1,476	65.1	
Labour	J. Davies	971	42.8	
Labour	J. Philip	784	34.6	
Labour	R. Willis	447	19.7	
Turnout		~2,267	~56.4	
Registered electors		4,019		
Conservative hold				
Conservative hold				
Independent hold				

=== Ditchingham ===
Ditchingham
Party	Candidate	Votes	%	±%
Conservative	S. Summerfield	Unopposed		
Registered electors		1,367		
Conservative hold				

=== Forehoe ===
Forehoe
Party	Candidate	Votes	%	±%
Conservative	B. Cook*	782	73.1	
Labour	P. Eldridge	288	26.9	
Majority		494	46.2	
Turnout		1,070	73.4	
Registered electors		1,457		
Conservative hold		Swing		

=== Harleston ===
Harleston
Party	Candidate	Votes	%	±%
Liberal	S. Burton*	1,022	57.1	
Conservative	J. Mortimer	584	32.6	
Labour	F. To3	184	10.3	
Majority		438	24.5	
Turnout		1,790	79.2	
Registered electors		2,260		
Liberal hold		Swing		

=== Hempnall ===
Hempnall
Party	Candidate	Votes	%	±%
Conservative	H. Sargent*	700	68.6	
Labour	P. Cross	321	31.4	
Majority		379	37.1	
Turnout		1,021	80.4	
Registered electors		1,270		
Conservative gain from Independent		Swing		

=== Hingham ===
Hingham
Party	Candidate	Votes	%	±%
Conservative	H. Holman*	757	66.1	
Labour	J. Golden	388	33.9	
Majority		369	32.2	
Turnout		1,145	81.0	
Registered electors		1,414		
Conservative hold		Swing		

=== Humbleyard ===
Humbleyard
Party	Candidate	Votes	%	±%
Conservative	V. Bullen*	600	69.6	
Labour	J. Halsey	262	30.4	
Majority		338	39.2	
Turnout		862	72.3	
Registered electors		1,192		
Conservative hold		Swing		

=== Kidner ===
Kidner
Party	Candidate	Votes	%	±%
Independent	S. Peacock*	839	75.2	
Labour	T. O'Hagan	277	24.8	
Majority		562	50.4	
Turnout		1,116	78.9	
Registered electors		1,414		
Independent hold		Swing		

=== Long Row ===
Long Row
Party	Candidate	Votes	%	±%
Independent	T. Potter*	630	58.8	
Conservative	G. Goodall	442	41.2	
Majority		188	17.5	
Turnout		1,072	79.3	
Registered electors		1,352		
Independent hold		Swing		

=== Marshland ===
Marshland
Party	Candidate	Votes	%	±%
Labour	E. Rochford	570	51.2	
Independent	P. Werry	544	48.8	
Majority		26	2.3	
Turnout		1,114	80.5	
Registered electors		1,383		
Labour gain from Conservative		Swing		

=== Mergate ===
Mergate
Party	Candidate	Votes	%	±%
Independent	P. Mickleburgh	877	54.0	
Conservative	M. Loveless	459	28.2	
Labour	H. Phillips	289	17.8	
Majority		418	25.7	
Turnout		1,625	77.0	
Registered electors		2,111		
Independent gain from Conservative		Swing		

=== New Costessey ===
New Costessey (2 seats)
Party	Candidate	Votes	%
Conservative	A. Moorhouse*	Unopposed	
Conservative	G. Evans	Unopposed	
Registered electors		3,447	
Conservative win (new seat)			
Conservative win (new seat)			

=== Northfields ===
Northfields
Party	Candidate	Votes	%
Conservative	B. Partridge	530	51.4
Labour	A. Reilly	501	48.6
Majority		29	2.8
Turnout		1,031	76.0
Registered electors		1,356	
Conservative win (new seat)			

=== Old Costessey ===
Old Costessey (2 seats)
Party	Candidate	Votes	%
Conservative	H. Chapman*	1,568	64.9
Conservative	D. Whiskerd*	1,567	64.9
Labour	M. Manuel	845	35.0
Labour	E. Williams	834	34.5
Turnout		~2,415	68.9
Registered electors		3,504	
Conservative win (new seat)			
Conservative win (new seat)			

=== Poringland With The Framinghams ===
Poringland With The Framinghams (2 seats)
Party	Candidate	Votes	%	±%
Conservative	R. Sykes*	1,182	69.8	
Conservative	C. Whitehead	1,152	68.0	
Labour	T. Clennell	514	30.3	
Turnout		~1,694	66.6	
Registered electors		2,545		
Conservative gain from Independent				
Conservative gain from Independent				

=== Rustens ===
Rustens
Party	Candidate	Votes	%
Conservative	T. Ford*	802	62.6
Labour	G. Williams	480	37.4
Majority		322	25.1
Turnout		1,282	76.6
Registered electors		1,674	
Conservative win (new seat)			

=== Scole ===
Scole
Party	Candidate	Votes	%	±%
Conservative	V. Alexander*	624	52.3	
Liberal	D. Caldwell	569	47.7	
Majority		55	4.6	
Turnout		1,193	77.2	
Registered electors		1,546		
Conservative hold		Swing		

=== Smockmill ===
Smockmill
Party	Candidate	Votes	%	±%
Independent	A. King*	920	75.0	
Labour	T. Phillips	307	25.0	
Majority		613	50.0	
Turnout		1,227	73.1	
Registered electors		1,679		
Independent hold		Swing		

=== Springfields ===
Springfields
Party	Candidate	Votes	%	±%
Conservative	J. Easton*	Unopposed		
Registered electors		1,096		
Conservative hold				

=== Stratton ===
Stratton
Party	Candidate	Votes	%	±%
Conservative	P. Phillips	650	50.3	
Independent	R. Cooke	643	49.7	
Majority		7	0.5	
Turnout		1,293	73.5	
Registered electors		1,760		
Conservative gain from Independent		Swing		

=== Tasvale ===
Tasvale
Party	Candidate	Votes	%	±%
Conservative	P. Starling*	Unopposed		
Registered electors		1,455		
Conservative hold				

=== Town ===
Town
Party	Candidate	Votes	%
Conservative	E. Capps*	618	52.8
Labour	A. Knights	552	47.2
Majority		66	5.6
Turnout		1,170	78.1
Registered electors		1,499	
Conservative win (new seat)			

=== Valley ===
Valley
Party	Candidate	Votes	%	±%
Conservative	G. Steele	647	50.3	
Liberal	M. Pagan*	640	49.7	
Majority		7	0.5	
Turnout		1,287	81.6	
Registered electors		1,577		
Conservative gain from Liberal		Swing		

=== Waveney ===
Waveney
Party	Candidate	Votes	%	±%
Conservative	M. Martin*	Unopposed		
Registered electors		1,430		
Conservative hold				

=== Westwood ===
Westwood
Party	Candidate	Votes	%	±%
Independent	N. Chapman*	1,082	71.8	
Conservative	A. Mitchell	424	28.2	
Majority		658	43.7	
Turnout		1,506	78.0	
Registered electors		1,930		
Independent hold		Swing		

=== Wodehouse ===
Wodehouse
Party	Candidate	Votes	%	±%
Conservative	A. Cook*	676	74.2	
Labour	R. Clegg	235	25.8	
Majority		441	48.4	
Turnout		911	78.9	
Registered electors		1,155		
Conservative hold		Swing		
