= 1995 South Norfolk District Council election =

1995 English local government election

- 4 May 1995

All 47 seats to South Norfolk District Council 24 seats needed for a majority

	First party	Second party
Party	Liberal Democrats	Conservative
Seats won	30	12
Seat change	▲10	▼11
Popular vote	23,698	14,001
Percentage	46.7%	27.6%
Swing	▲5.2%	▼10.2%
	Third party	Fourth party
Party	Labour	Independent
Seats won	3	2
Seat change	▲3	▼2
Popular vote	10,863	2,022
Percentage	21.4%	4.0%
Swing	▲6.0%	▼1.0%
- Winner of each seat at the 1995 South Norfolk District Council election.
Control before election
No overall control
Control after election
Liberal Democrats

The 1995 South Norfolk District Council election took place on 4 May 1995 to elect members of South Norfolk District Council in Norfolk, England. This was on the same day as other local elections.

== Summary ==
=== Election result ===
1995 South Norfolk District Council election
Party	Candidates	Seats	Gains	Losses	Net gain/loss	Seats %	Votes %	Votes	+/−
Liberal Democrats	47	30	11	1	▲10	63.8	46.7	23,698	+5.2
Conservative	44	12	0	11	▼11	25.5	27.6	14,001	–10.2
Labour	47	3	3	0	▲3	6.4	21.4	10,863	+6.0
Independent	8	2	1	3	▼2	4.3	4.0	2,022	–1.0
Green	4	0	0	0	Steady	0.0	0.3	171	±0.0

== Ward results ==
Incumbent councillors standing for re-election are marked with an asterisk (*). Changes in seats do not take into account by-elections or defections.

=== Abbey ===
Abbey
Party	Candidate	Votes	%	±%
Liberal Democrats	K. Body*	444	49.0	
Labour	C. Greengrass	284	31.3	
Conservative	D. Baker	178	19.6	
Majority		160	17.7	
Turnout		906	48.4	
Registered electors		1,881		
Liberal Democrats hold		Swing		

=== Abbeyfield ===
Abbeyfield
Party	Candidate	Votes	%	±%
Independent	B. Clarke*	430	59.5	
Labour	W. McCloughan	239	33.1	
Liberal Democrats	P. Sattin	54	7.5	
Majority		191	26.4	
Turnout		723	53.0	
Registered electors		1,375		
Independent hold		Swing		

=== Beauchamp ===
Beauchamp
Party	Candidate	Votes	%	±%
Conservative	A. Hawthorne*	359	46.2	
Labour	G. Brewster	262	33.7	
Liberal Democrats	C. Harris	156	20.1	
Majority		97	12.5	
Turnout		777	49.2	
Registered electors		1,583		
Conservative hold		Swing		

=== Beck Vale ===
Beck Vale
Party	Candidate	Votes	%	±%
Liberal Democrats	J. Halliday	572	60.9	
Conservative	J. Tyler	240	25.6	
Labour	B. Ziolkowska	127	13.5	
Majority		332	35.4	
Turnout		939	54.4	
Registered electors		1,741		
Liberal Democrats hold		Swing		

=== Beckhithe ===
Beckhithe (2 seats)
Party	Candidate	Votes	%	±%
Liberal Democrats	D. Pond	964	47.7	
Liberal Democrats	D. Hall	940	46.5	
Conservative	P. Bond*	635	31.4	
Conservative	C. Hornsby	518	25.6	
Labour	D. Clennell	409	20.2	
Labour	D. Cowles	332	16.4	
Turnout		~2,023	45.3	
Registered electors		4,466		
Liberal Democrats gain from Conservative				
Liberal Democrats gain from Conservative				

=== Berners ===
Berners
Party	Candidate	Votes	%	±%
Liberal Democrats	R. Percival	548	52.2	
Conservative	R. Tilbrook*	396	37.7	
Labour	J. Watt	106	10.1	
Majority		152	14.5	
Turnout		1,050	57.1	
Registered electors		1,849		
Liberal Democrats gain from Conservative		Swing		

=== Boyland ===
Boyland
Party	Candidate	Votes	%	±%
Conservative	E. Lines*	442	43.5	
Liberal Democrats	I. Caldwell	354	34.8	
Labour	J. Philip	221	21.7	
Majority		88	8.7	
Turnout		1,017	46.7	
Registered electors		2,185		
Conservative hold		Swing		

=== Broads ===
Broads
Party	Candidate	Votes	%	±%
Conservative	S. Knollys*	420	48.0	
Labour	M. Wells	243	27.8	
Liberal Democrats	S. Raddon	122	13.9	
Green	I. Wagenknecht	90	10.3	
Majority		177	20.2	
Turnout		875	56.9	
Registered electors		1,545		
Conservative hold		Swing		

=== Brookwood ===
Brookwood
Party	Candidate	Votes	%	±%
Conservative	K. Warman*	493	49.4	
Liberal Democrats	R. Lawes	329	33.0	
Labour	I. Lochhead	175	17.6	
Majority		164	16.4	
Turnout		997	59.5	
Registered electors		1,682		
Conservative hold		Swing		

=== Chet ===
Chet
Party	Candidate	Votes	%	±%
Conservative	A. Young*	499	44.7	
Labour	R. Ford	445	39.9	
Liberal Democrats	M. McPhee	172	15.4	
Majority		54	4.8	
Turnout		1,116	50.5	
Registered electors		2,214		
Conservative hold		Swing		

=== Clavering ===
Clavering
Party	Candidate	Votes	%	±%
Liberal Democrats	P. Mitchell	484	59.3	
Labour	R. Prosser	183	22.4	
Conservative	D. Watkins	149	18.3	
Majority		301	36.9	
Turnout		816	47.1	
Registered electors		1,731		
Liberal Democrats gain from Independent		Swing		

=== Cringleford & Colney ===
Cringleford & Colney
Party	Candidate	Votes	%	±%
Conservative	K. Rowe*	491	47.4	
Liberal Democrats	P. Hollingham	474	45.8	
Labour	M. Ranson	70	6.8	
Majority		17	1.6	
Turnout		1,035	57.1	
Registered electors		1,819		
Conservative hold		Swing		

=== Cromwells ===
Cromwells
Party	Candidate	Votes	%	±%
Liberal Democrats	D. Hockaday*	317	51.3	
Labour	C. Brett	179	29.0	
Conservative	B. Ford	122	19.7	
Majority		138	22.3	
Turnout		618	46.4	
Registered electors		1,341		
Liberal Democrats hold		Swing		

=== Crown Point ===
Crown Point
Party	Candidate	Votes	%	±%
Conservative	R. Smith*	207	44.1	
Labour	J. King	175	37.3	
Liberal Democrats	G. Bradshaw	87	18.6	
Majority		32	6.8	
Turnout		469	49.3	
Registered electors		953		
Conservative hold		Swing		

=== Dickleburgh ===
Dickleburgh
Party	Candidate	Votes	%	±%
Liberal Democrats	P. Allen	336	48.3	
Conservative	E. Turner	199	28.6	
Labour	S. Davies	160	23.0	
Majority		137	19.7	
Turnout		695	50.2	
Registered electors		1,387		
Liberal Democrats gain from Conservative		Swing		

=== Diss ===
Diss (3 seats)
Party	Candidate	Votes	%	±%
Liberal Democrats	J. Caldwell*	1,215	59.1	
Liberal Democrats	I. Jacoby*	1,215	59.1	
Liberal Democrats	D. Cooper	707	34.4	
Independent	S. Kitchen	401	19.5	
Labour	M. Flatman	366	17.8	
Labour	I. Larkin	355	17.3	
Labour	N. Rozier	325	15.8	
Conservative	P. Carver	292	14.2	
Conservative	J. Savage	280	13.6	
Conservative	J. Matthews	264	12.8	
Turnout		~2,055	37.9	
Registered electors		5,422		
Liberal Democrats hold				
Liberal Democrats hold				
Liberal Democrats gain from Independent				

=== Ditchingham ===
Ditchingham
Party	Candidate	Votes	%	±%
Liberal Democrats	R. Carden	602	62.9	
Labour	S. Pank	191	20.0	
Conservative	P. Barrett-Vane	164	17.1	
Majority		411	42.9	
Turnout		957	52.6	
Registered electors		1,827		
Liberal Democrats hold		Swing		

=== Forehoe ===
Forehoe
Party	Candidate	Votes	%	±%
Liberal Democrats	J. Mackie	290	38.0	
Conservative	S. Orton*	279	36.6	
Labour	L. Coleman	194	25.4	
Majority		11	1.4	
Turnout		763	49.5	
Registered electors		1,541		
Liberal Democrats gain from Conservative		Swing		

=== Harleston ===
Harleston
Party	Candidate	Votes	%	±%
Liberal Democrats	S. Taylor*	947	65.3	
Conservative	M. Turbin	285	19.7	
Labour	L. Larkin	218	15.0	
Majority		662	45.7	
Turnout		1,450	47.6	
Registered electors		3,055		
Liberal Democrats hold		Swing		

=== Hempnall ===
Hempnall
Party	Candidate	Votes	%	±%
Liberal Democrats	S. Beare*	518	60.0	
Conservative	J. Ellis	278	32.2	
Labour	J. Holtom	67	7.8	
Majority		240	27.8	
Turnout		863	59.5	
Registered electors		1,455		
Liberal Democrats hold		Swing		

=== Hingham ===
Hingham
Party	Candidate	Votes	%	±%
Liberal Democrats	P. Dore*	519	60.2	
Conservative	A. Lys	220	25.5	
Labour	A. Rutherford	123	14.3	
Majority		299	34.7	
Turnout		862	53.3	
Registered electors		1,622		
Liberal Democrats hold		Swing		

=== Humbleyard ===
Humbleyard
Party	Candidate	Votes	%	±%
Liberal Democrats	D. Lishman*	327	51.0	
Independent	S. Lacey	227	35.4	
Labour	S. Sewell	87	13.6	
Majority		100	15.6	
Turnout		641	49.4	
Registered electors		1,298		
Liberal Democrats gain from Independent		Swing		

=== Kidner ===
Kidner
Party	Candidate	Votes	%	±%
Independent	M. Tomlinson*	489	60.4	
Labour	E. Bellamy	166	20.5	
Liberal Democrats	D. Fairbairn	128	15.8	
Green	S. Ross-Wagenknecht	27	3.3	
Majority		323	39.9	
Turnout		810	53.7	
Registered electors		1,512		
Independent gain from Conservative		Swing		

=== Long Row ===
Long Row
Party	Candidate	Votes	%	±%
Labour	Daniel Zeichner	377	46.7	
Conservative	D. Mitchell*	277	34.3	
Liberal Democrats	A. Nursey	125	15.5	
Green	M. Harmer	28	3.5	
Majority		100	12.4	
Turnout		807	53.0	
Registered electors		1,524		
Labour gain from Conservative		Swing		

=== Marshland ===
Marshland
Party	Candidate	Votes	%	±%
Liberal Democrats	E. Playle*	344	50.2	
Labour	H. Kelsey	207	30.2	
Conservative	M. Bailey	134	19.6	
Majority		137	20.0	
Turnout		685	47.2	
Registered electors		1,452		
Liberal Democrats hold		Swing		

=== Mergate ===
Mergate
Party	Candidate	Votes	%	±%
Liberal Democrats	A. Baker	705	46.4	
Conservative	N. Legg	296	19.5	
Independent	P. Mickleburgh	263	17.3	
Labour	D. Higgin	243	16.0	
Independent	J. Myhill	13	0.9	
Majority		409	26.9	
Turnout		1,520	53.1	
Registered electors		2,878		
Liberal Democrats gain from Conservative		Swing		

=== New Costessey ===
New Costessey (2 seats)
Party	Candidate	Votes	%	±%
Liberal Democrats	W. Dinneen*	744	51.8	
Liberal Democrats	L. Webster	705	49.1	
Labour	I. Button	355	24.7	
Labour	I. Boreham	341	23.7	
Conservative	R. Thompson	338	23.5	
Conservative	L. Loveless	302	21.0	
Turnout		~1,436	40.0	
Registered electors		3,590		
Liberal Democrats hold				
Liberal Democrats hold				

=== Northfields ===
Northfields
Party	Candidate	Votes	%	±%
Conservative	J. Mooney*	432	42.0	
Labour	P. Nicholls	379	36.9	
Liberal Democrats	K. McClure	217	21.1	
Majority		53	5.2	
Turnout		1,028	52.9	
Registered electors		1,960		
Conservative hold		Swing		

=== Old Costessey ===
Old Costessey (2 seats)
Party	Candidate	Votes	%	±%
Liberal Democrats	T. East*	994	59.9	
Liberal Democrats	R. Smith	838	50.5	
Conservative	K. Bingham	400	24.1	
Conservative	E. Senior	338	20.4	
Labour	R. Barker	302	18.2	
Labour	D. Vaughan	216	13.0	
Turnout		~1,659	38.5	
Registered electors		4,310		
Liberal Democrats hold				
Liberal Democrats hold				

=== Poringland With The Framinghams ===
Poringland With The Framinghams (2 seats)
Party	Candidate	Votes	%	±%
Liberal Democrats	J. Tryggvason*	868	49.0	
Liberal Democrats	S. Lawes	776	43.8	
Conservative	J. Overton	686	38.7	
Conservative	W. Kidner	610	34.4	
Labour	P. Bonnick	221	12.5	
Labour	T. Sanders	207	11.7	
Turnout		~1,772	53.9	
Registered electors		3,289		
Liberal Democrats gain from Conservative				
Liberal Democrats gain from Conservative				

=== Rustens ===
Rustens
Party	Candidate	Votes	%	±%
Labour	T. Ransom	488	47.3	
Conservative	J. Barnard*	360	34.9	
Liberal Democrats	T. Ellingworth	184	17.8	
Majority		128	12.4	
Turnout		1,032	45.5	
Registered electors		2,305		
Labour gain from Conservative		Swing		

=== Scole ===
Scole
Party	Candidate	Votes	%	±%
Conservative	V. Alexander*	395	42.5	
Liberal Democrats	P. Harris	322	34.6	
Labour	I. Stebbing	187	20.1	
Green	G. Sessions	26	2.8	
Majority		73	7.8	
Turnout		930	52.6	
Registered electors		1,772		
Conservative hold		Swing		

=== Smockmill ===
Smockmill
Party	Candidate	Votes	%	±%
Liberal Democrats	J. Peterson*	514	58.7	
Conservative	P. Howarth	223	25.5	
Labour	A. Haywood	139	15.9	
Majority		291	33.2	
Turnout		876	45.9	
Registered electors		1,917		
Liberal Democrats hold		Swing		

=== Springfields ===
Springfields
Party	Candidate	Votes	%	±%
Conservative	V. Richardson	210	36.8	
Liberal Democrats	P. Bunting	188	32.9	
Labour	P. Neale	173	30.3	
Majority		22	3.9	
Turnout		571	45.8	
Registered electors		1,250		
Conservative hold		Swing		

=== Stratton ===
Stratton
Party	Candidate	Votes	%	±%
Liberal Democrats	P. Smith*	661	59.8	
Labour	G. Aitken	213	19.3	
Independent	R. Turner	134	12.1	
Conservative	S. Barrett-Vane	97	8.8	
Majority		448	40.5	
Turnout		1,105	45.3	
Registered electors		2,449		
Liberal Democrats hold		Swing		

=== Tasvale ===
Tasvale
Party	Candidate	Votes	%	±%
Liberal Democrats	P. Bradshaw*	749	73.7	
Conservative	J. Bailey	154	15.2	
Labour	R. Cottey	113	11.1	
Majority		595	58.6	
Turnout		1,016	60.3	
Registered electors		1,690		
Liberal Democrats hold		Swing		

=== Town ===
Town
Party	Candidate	Votes	%	±%
Labour	R. Barber	310	39.3	
Liberal Democrats	J. Wood	248	31.5	
Conservative	L. Elston	230	29.2	
Majority		62	7.9	
Turnout		788	50.9	
Registered electors		1,552		
Labour gain from Liberal Democrats		Swing		

=== Valley ===
Valley
Party	Candidate	Votes	%	±%
Liberal Democrats	M. Gray*	694	73.1	
Conservative	C. Kemp	158	16.6	
Labour	R. McKie	98	10.3	
Majority		536	56.4	
Turnout		950	55.5	
Registered electors		1,717		
Liberal Democrats hold		Swing		

=== Waveney ===
Waveney
Party	Candidate	Votes	%	±%
Liberal Democrats	F. Mitchell*	449	59.3	
Conservative	S. Foster	159	21.0	
Labour	B. Falkner	149	19.7	
Majority		290	38.3	
Turnout		757	50.2	
Registered electors		1,511		
Liberal Democrats hold		Swing		

=== Westwood ===
Westwood
Party	Candidate	Votes	%	±%
Conservative	N. Chapman*	520	42.9	
Liberal Democrats	R. McClenning	349	28.8	
Labour	S. Blaikie	278	22.9	
Independent	H. Jeffs	65	5.4	
Majority		171	14.1	
Turnout		1,212	49.0	
Registered electors		2,477		
Conservative hold		Swing		

=== Wodehouse ===
Wodehouse
Party	Candidate	Votes	%	±%
Conservative	M. Dewsbury*	272	42.5	
Liberal Democrats	P. Blathwayt	203	31.7	
Labour	S. Urquhart	165	25.8	
Majority		69	10.8	
Turnout		640	49.2	
Registered electors		1,304		
Conservative hold		Swing		

== By-elections ==
=== Diss ===
Diss by-election: 30 July 1998
Party	Candidate	Votes	%	±%
Liberal Democrats		731	48.5	
Conservative		271	18.0	
Labour		257	17.0	
Independent		249	16.5	
Majority		460	30.5	
Turnout		1,508	27.6	
Registered electors		5,464		
Liberal Democrats hold		Swing		
