= 1987 South Norfolk District Council election =

1987 English local election

- 7 May 1987

All 47 seats to South Norfolk District Council 24 seats needed for a majority

	First party	Second party
Party	Conservative	Alliance
Seats won	23	16
Seat change	▼11	▲11
Popular vote	20,639	23,522
Percentage	36.3%	41.4%
Swing	▼8.9%	▲11.7%
	Third party	Fourth party
Party	Independent	Labour
Seats won	8	0
Seat change	▲1	▼1
Popular vote	7,141	5,534
Percentage	12.6%	9.7%
Swing	▲3.5%	▼5.2%
- Winner of each seat at the 1987 South Norfolk District Council election.
Control before election
Conservative
Control after election
No overall control

The 1987 South Norfolk District Council election took place on 7 May 1987 to elect members of South Norfolk District Council in Norfolk, England. This was on the same day as other local elections.

== Summary ==
=== Election result ===
1987 South Norfolk District Council election
Party	Candidates	Seats	Gains	Losses	Net gain/loss	Seats %	Votes %	Votes	+/−
Conservative	39	23	2	13	▼11	48.9	36.3	20,639	–8.9
Alliance	47	16	11	0	▲11	34.0	41.4	23,522	+11.7
Independent	13	8	3	2	▲1	17.0	12.6	7,141	+3.5
Labour	37	0	0	1	▼1	0.0	9.7	5,534	–5.2

== Ward results ==
Incumbent councillors standing for re-election are marked with an asterisk (*). Changes in seats do not take into account by-elections or defections.

=== Abbey ===
Abbey
Party	Candidate	Votes	%	±%
Conservative	L. Storey	351	41.6	
Alliance	J. Cousins	330	39.1	
Labour	P. Davies	163	19.3	
Majority		21	2.5	
Turnout		844	61.3	
Registered electors		1,393		
Conservative hold		Swing		

=== Abbeyfield ===
Abbeyfield
Party	Candidate	Votes	%	±%
Independent	B. Clarke	390	48.3	
Alliance	J. Skilliter	297	36.8	
Independent	M. Cooke	121	15.0	
Majority		93	11.5	
Turnout		808	56.6	
Registered electors		1,427		
Independent hold		Swing		

=== Beauchamp ===
Beauchamp
Party	Candidate	Votes	%	±%
Conservative	A. Hood	510	57.4	
Alliance	J. Hansen	320	36.0	
Labour	R. Kelsey	58	6.5	
Majority		190	21.4	
Turnout		888	60.3	
Registered electors		1,430		
Conservative hold		Swing		

=== Beck Vale ===
Beck Vale
Party	Candidate	Votes	%	±%
Alliance	J. Rawlence*	600	58.5	
Conservative	J. Tyler	377	36.8	
Labour	P. Smee	48	4.7	
Majority		223	21.8	
Turnout		1,025	64.4	
Registered electors		1,599		
Alliance hold		Swing		

=== Beckhithe ===
Beckhithe (2 seats)
Party	Candidate	Votes	%	±%
Independent	D. Pigg*	1,075	55.8	
Independent	J. Howard	904	46.9	
Alliance	J. Scarfe	649	33.7	
Alliance	F. Watkins	578	30.0	
Labour	D. Clennell	237	12.3	
Labour	E. Parker	209	10.8	
Turnout		~1,928	50.7	
Registered electors		3,801		
Independent hold				
Independent hold				

=== Berners ===
Berners
Party	Candidate	Votes	%	±%
Independent	R. Tilbrook*	596	57.1	
Alliance	D. Piercy	398	38.2	
Labour	A. Clough	49	4.7	
Majority		198	19.0	
Turnout		1,043	59.0	
Registered electors		1,787		
Independent gain from Conservative		Swing		

=== Boyland ===
Boyland
Party	Candidate	Votes	%	±%
Independent	E. Lines*	404	35.2	
Alliance	A. Ross	334	29.1	
Conservative	D. Bevan	313	27.2	
Labour	V. Root	98	8.5	
Majority		70	6.1	
Turnout		1,149	56.7	
Registered electors		2,033		
Independent gain from Ind. Conservative		Swing		

=== Broads ===
Broads
Party	Candidate	Votes	%	±%
Conservative	S. Knollys*	540	58.8	
Alliance	E. Green	378	41.2	
Majority		162	17.6	
Turnout		918	66.7	
Registered electors		1,384		
Conservative hold		Swing		

=== Brookwood ===
Brookwood
Party	Candidate	Votes	%	±%
Conservative	K. Warman*	647	63.7	
Alliance	R. Johnson	270	26.6	
Labour	T. Sanders	99	9.7	
Majority		377	37.1	
Turnout		1,016	59.0	
Registered electors		1,731		
Conservative hold		Swing		

=== Chet ===
Chet
Party	Candidate	Votes	%	±%
Conservative	W. Hemmant*	462	54.1	
Labour	R. Ford	205	24.0	
Alliance	T. Wells	187	21.9	
Majority		257	30.1	
Turnout		854	46.8	
Registered electors		1,829		
Conservative hold		Swing		

=== Clavering ===
Clavering
Party	Candidate	Votes	%	±%
Independent	K. Morgan*	682	84.5	
Labour	L. Hannant	125	15.5	
Majority		557	69.0	
Turnout		807	46.2	
Registered electors		1,760		
Independent hold		Swing		

=== Cringleford & Colney ===
Cringleford & Colney
Party	Candidate	Votes	%	±%
Conservative	J. Mackew*	778	64.1	
Alliance	M. Glavert	435	35.9	
Majority		343	28.3	
Turnout		1,213	67.2	
Registered electors		1,805		
Conservative hold		Swing		

=== Cromwells ===
Cromwells
Party	Candidate	Votes	%	±%
Alliance	D. Hockaday	381	46.1	
Conservative	P. Tonkin*	265	32.1	
Labour	C. Brett	180	21.8	
Majority		116	14.0	
Turnout		826	57.7	
Registered electors		1,374		
Alliance gain from Conservative		Swing		

=== Crown Point ===
Crown Point
Party	Candidate	Votes	%	±%
Alliance	T. Lewis	319	53.2	
Independent	J. Hewitt	281	46.8	
Majority		38	6.3	
Turnout		600	59.4	
Registered electors		1,013		
Alliance gain from Conservative		Swing		

=== Dickleburgh ===
Dickleburgh
Party	Candidate	Votes	%	±%
Conservative	F. Clark*	451	55.7	
Alliance	G. Artis	280	34.6	
Labour	S. Davies	78	9.6	
Majority		171	21.1	
Turnout		809	60.6	
Registered electors		1,342		
Conservative hold		Swing		

=== Diss ===
Diss (3 seats)
Party	Candidate	Votes	%	±%
Alliance	I. Jacoby	881	40.2	
Independent	R. Hopgood	768	35.0	
Alliance	J. Caldwell	745	34.0	
Conservative	S. Kitchen*	721	32.9	
Alliance	P. Norfolk	689	31.4	
Conservative	D. Bell*	659	30.1	
Conservative	B. Ogle	603	27.5	
Labour	B. Willis	272	12.4	
Labour	M. Flatman	242	11.0	
Labour	D. Ziechner	184	8.4	
Turnout		~2,193	45.6	
Registered electors		4,809		
Alliance gain from Conservative				
Independent gain from Conservative				
Alliance gain from Conservative				

=== Ditchingham ===
Ditchingham
Party	Candidate	Votes	%	±%
Alliance	D. Kerridge	599	55.6	
Conservative	E. Neil	478	44.4	
Majority		121	11.2	
Turnout		1,077	64.7	
Registered electors		1,671		
Alliance gain from Conservative		Swing		

=== Forehoe ===
Forehoe
Party	Candidate	Votes	%	±%
Conservative	B. Cook*	448	57.8	
Alliance	F. Barrow	327	42.2	
Majority		121	15.6	
Turnout		775	51.2	
Registered electors		1,513		
Conservative hold		Swing		

=== Harleston ===
Harleston
Party	Candidate	Votes	%	±%
Alliance	S. Taylor	893	57.8	
Independent	J. Wilkinson	504	32.6	
Labour	B. Warshaw	147	9.5	
Majority		389	25.2	
Turnout		1,544	58.4	
Registered electors		2,656		
Alliance hold		Swing		

=== Hempnall ===
Hempnall
Party	Candidate	Votes	%	±%
Conservative	H. Sargent*	401	47.4	
Alliance	G. Davey	391	46.2	
Labour	I. Warshaw	54	6.4	
Majority		10	1.2	
Turnout		846	58.3	
Registered electors		1,453		
Conservative hold		Swing		

=== Hingham ===
Hingham
Party	Candidate	Votes	%	±%
Alliance	P. Dore	460	47.6	
Independent	D. Boyce	420	43.4	
Labour	P. Eldridge	87	9.0	
Majority		40	4.1	
Turnout		967	61.6	
Registered electors		1,580		
Alliance hold		Swing		

=== Humbleyard ===
Humbleyard
Party	Candidate	Votes	%	±%
Conservative	R. Turner*	356	57.6	
Alliance	A. Pond	197	31.9	
Labour	J. Halsey	65	10.5	
Majority		159	25.7	
Turnout		618	57.3	
Registered electors		1,062		
Conservative hold		Swing		

=== Kidner ===
Kidner
Party	Candidate	Votes	%	±%
Conservative	M. Tomlinson	384	45.1	
Alliance	P. Blathwayt	334	39.2	
Labour	J. Cox	134	15.7	
Majority		50	5.9	
Turnout		852	57.6	
Registered electors		1,483		
Conservative hold		Swing		

=== Long Row ===
Long Row
Party	Candidate	Votes	%	±%
Conservative	P. Mullender	503	61.7	
Alliance	I. Caldwell	173	21.2	
Labour	J. Philip	139	17.1	
Majority		330	40.5	
Turnout		815	55.2	
Registered electors		1,477		
Conservative gain from Independent		Swing		

=== Marshland ===
Marshland
Party	Candidate	Votes	%	±%
Alliance	P. Arnold	386	42.9	
Conservative	T. Browne	321	35.7	
Labour	E. Rochford*	192	21.4	
Majority		65	7.2	
Turnout		899	67.1	
Registered electors		1,350		
Alliance gain from Labour		Swing		

=== Mergate ===
Mergate
Party	Candidate	Votes	%	±%
Conservative	M. Hardy	712	46.4	
Alliance	R. McClenning	624	40.6	
Labour	S. Sewell	200	13.0	
Majority		88	5.7	
Turnout		1,536	52.2	
Registered electors		2,926		
Conservative gain from Independent		Swing		

=== New Costessey ===
New Costessey (2 seats)
Party	Candidate	Votes	%	±%
Alliance	K. Rogers	866	48.0	
Alliance	P. Wheeldon	814	45.1	
Conservative	G. Evans*	683	37.8	
Conservative	A. Moorhouse*	656	36.3	
Labour	I. Button	298	16.5	
Turnout		~1,806	48.9	
Registered electors		3,689		
Alliance gain from Conservative				
Alliance gain from Conservative				

=== Northfields ===
Northfields
Party	Candidate	Votes	%	±%
Conservative	S. Barrett	365	43.4	
Alliance	R. Briggs	251	29.8	
Labour	K. Drewitt	225	26.8	
Majority		114	13.6	
Turnout		841	52.6	
Registered electors		1,638		
Conservative hold		Swing		

=== Old Costessey ===
Old Costessey (2 seats)
Party	Candidate	Votes	%	±%
Alliance	T. East*	1,237	68.5	
Alliance	K. Rogers	978	54.2	
Conservative	D. Hill*	806	44.6	
Conservative	D. Whiskerd	743	41.1	
Labour	S. Button	219	12.1	
Turnout		~2,148	51.4	
Registered electors		4,178		
Alliance hold				
Alliance gain from Conservative				

=== Poringland With The Framinghams ===
Poringland With The Framinghams (2 seats)
Party	Candidate	Votes	%	±%
Conservative	R. Sykes*	908	54.1	
Conservative	G. Hemming	785	46.8	
Alliance	M. Latten	480	28.6	
Alliance	F. Seelhof	450	26.8	
Labour	A. Haywood	227	13.5	
Labour	F. Huxtable	208	12.4	
Turnout		~1,677	54.1	
Registered electors		3,101		
Conservative hold				
Conservative hold				

=== Rustens ===
Rustens
Party	Candidate	Votes	%	±%
Conservative	J. Barnard	567	50.6	
Alliance	E. Annison	392	35.0	
Labour	T. Austin	162	14.5	
Majority		175	15.6	
Turnout		1,121	51.2	
Registered electors		2,218		
Conservative hold		Swing		

=== Scole ===
Scole
Party	Candidate	Votes	%	±%
Conservative	V. Alexander*	637	58.8	
Alliance	G. Sarbutt	374	34.5	
Labour	C. Catt	73	6.7	
Majority		263	24.3	
Turnout		1,084	62.5	
Registered electors		1,740		
Conservative hold		Swing		

=== Smockmill ===
Smockmill
Party	Candidate	Votes	%	±%
Independent	J. Peterson	628	63.1	
Independent	A. King*	368	36.9	
Majority		260	26.1	
Turnout		996	57.4	
Registered electors		1,745		
Independent hold		Swing		

=== Springfields ===
Springfields
Party	Candidate	Votes	%	±%
Conservative	J. Easton*	460	60.8	
Alliance	C. Bunting	297	39.2	
Majority		163	21.5	
Turnout		757	63.2	
Registered electors		1,206		
Conservative hold		Swing		

=== Stratton ===
Stratton
Party	Candidate	Votes	%	±%
Alliance	P. Smith	664	57.2	
Conservative	P. Phillips*	424	36.5	
Labour	S. Blaikie	73	6.3	
Majority		240	20.7	
Turnout		1,161	54.7	
Registered electors		2,148		
Alliance gain from Conservative		Swing		

=== Tasvale ===
Tasvale
Party	Candidate	Votes	%	±%
Alliance	P. Bradshaw	523	49.5	
Conservative	P. Ayers*	450	42.6	
Labour	J. King	83	7.9	
Majority		73	6.9	
Turnout		1,056	63.5	
Registered electors		1,667		
Alliance gain from Conservative		Swing		

=== Town ===
Town
Party	Candidate	Votes	%	±%
Alliance	S. Buckton*	452	52.7	
Conservative	S. Orton	261	30.4	
Labour	J. Drewitt	145	16.9	
Majority		191	22.3	
Turnout		858	55.4	
Registered electors		1,570		
Alliance hold		Swing		

=== Valley ===
Valley
Party	Candidate	Votes	%	±%
Conservative	J. Scott	538	49.6	
Alliance	J. Gray	429	39.5	
Labour	A. Todd	118	10.9	
Majority		109	10.0	
Turnout		1,085	67.9	
Registered electors		1,614		
Conservative hold		Swing		

=== Waveney ===
Waveney
Party	Candidate	Votes	%	±%
Conservative	A. Shannon	491	49.9	
Alliance	F. Mitchell	414	42.1	
Labour	P. Jackson	78	7.9	
Majority		77	7.8	
Turnout		983	64.2	
Registered electors		1,543		
Conservative hold		Swing		

=== Westwood ===
Westwood
Party	Candidate	Votes	%	±%
Conservative	N. Chapman*	792	58.3	
Alliance	F. Baldwin	566	41.7	
Majority		226	16.6	
Turnout		1,358	58.0	
Registered electors		2,361		
Conservative hold		Swing		

=== Wodehouse ===
Wodehouse
Party	Candidate	Votes	%	±%
Conservative	A. Cook*	428	62.0	
Alliance	O. Wheeldon	200	29.0	
Labour	T. Clennell	62	9.0	
Majority		228	33.0	
Turnout		690	55.3	
Registered electors		1,253		
Conservative hold		Swing		

== By-elections ==
=== New Costessey ===
New Costessey by-election: 15 September 1988
Party	Candidate	Votes	%	±%
Conservative		571	41.5	
SLD		537	39.0	
Labour		268	19.5	
Majority		34	2.5	
Turnout		1,376	38.3	
Registered electors		3,593		
Conservative gain from SLD		Swing		

=== Ditchingham ===
Ditchingham by-election: 4 May 1989
Party	Candidate	Votes	%	±%
SLD		447	45.8	
Conservative		398	40.8	
Labour		130	13.3	
Majority		49	5.0	
Turnout		975	58.3	
Registered electors		1,672		
SLD hold		Swing		

=== Marshland ===
Marshland by-election: 4 October 1990
Party	Candidate	Votes	%	±%
Liberal Democrats		263	38.6	
Labour		235	34.5	
Conservative		184	27.0	
Majority		28	4.1	
Turnout		682	50.0	
Registered electors		1,364		
Liberal Democrats hold		Swing		
