= 1976 South Norfolk District Council election =

1976 English local election

- 6 May 1976

All 47 seats to South Norfolk District Council 24 seats needed for a majority

	First party	Second party	Third party
Party	Conservative	Independent	Liberal
Seats won	23	21	2
Seat change	▲17	▼12	▲1
Popular vote	16,405	7,964	2,011
Percentage	44.6%	21.6%	5.5%
Swing	▲38.8%	▼29.1%	▼5.1%
	Fourth party	Fifth party
Party	Ind. Conservative	Labour
Seats won	1	0
Seat change	▲1	▼7
Popular vote	352	9,899
Percentage	1.0%	26.9%
Swing	▲0.8%	▼4.5%
Control before election
Independent
Control after election
No overall control

The 1976 South Norfolk District Council election took place on 6 May 1976 to elect members of South Norfolk District Council in Norfolk, England. This was on the same day as other local elections.

== Summary ==
=== Election result ===
1976 South Norfolk District Council election
Party	Candidates	Seats	Gains	Losses	Net gain/loss	Seats %	Votes %	Votes	+/−
Conservative	26	23	19	2	▲17	48.9	44.6	16,405	+38.8
Independent	32	21	3	15	▼12	44.7	21.6	7,964	–29.1
Liberal	4	2	1	0	▲1	4.3	5.5	2,011	–5.1
Ind. Conservative	2	1	1	0	▲1	2.1	1.0	352	+0.8
Labour	19	0	0	7	▼7	0.0	26.9	9,899	–4.5
Ind. Socialist	1	0	0	0	Steady	0.0	0.5	183	N/A

== Ward results ==
Incumbent councillors standing for re-election are marked with an asterisk (*). Changes in seats do not take into account by-elections or defections.

=== Abbeyfield ===
Abbeyfield
Party	Candidate	Votes	%	±%
Independent	J. Birkett-Stubbs	244	55.2	
Conservative	M. Sewell	198	44.8	
Majority		46	10.4	
Turnout		447	33.5	
Registered electors		1,335		
Independent gain from Labour		Swing		

=== Beck Vale ===
Beck Vale
Party	Candidate	Votes	%	±%
Independent	P. Smoothy*	Unopposed		
Registered electors		1,464		
Independent hold				

=== Beckhithe ===
Beckhithe (2 seats)
Party	Candidate	Votes	%	±%
Independent	H. Back*	926		
Independent	K. Wiles*	844		
Labour	G. Williams	280		
Labour	E. Parker	266		
Turnout		~1,225	39.0	
Registered electors		3,140		
Independent hold				
Independent hold				

=== Berners ===
Berners
Party	Candidate	Votes	%	±%
Ind. Conservative	R. Tilbrook*	Unopposed		
Registered electors		1,330		
Ind. Conservative gain from Independent				

=== Boyland ===
Boyland
Party	Candidate	Votes	%	±%
Independent	B. Gaze	449	61.3	
Independent	E. Lines*	283	38.7	
Majority		166	22.7	
Turnout		739	49.1	
Registered electors		1,504		
Independent hold		Swing		

=== Brookwood ===
Brookwood
Party	Candidate	Votes	%	±%
Conservative	A. Anderson	Unopposed		
Registered electors		1,462		
Conservative hold				

=== Chet ===
Chet
Party	Candidate	Votes	%	±%
Independent	W. Hemmant*	Unopposed		
Registered electors		1,466		
Independent hold				

=== Clavering ===
Clavering
Party	Candidate	Votes	%	±%
Independent	G. Harris*	Unopposed		
Registered electors		1,475		
Independent hold				

=== Cringleford & Colney ===
Cringleford & Colney
Party	Candidate	Votes	%	±%
Independent	J. Aikens*	Unopposed		
Registered electors		1,458		
Independent gain from Conservative				

=== Crown Point ===
Crown Point
Party	Candidate	Votes	%	±%
Conservative	J. Bidley-Thomas	156	39.5	
Labour	G. Williams	152	38.5	
Independent	N. Agar	87	22.0	
Majority		4	1.0	
Turnout		395	38.8	
Registered electors		1,020		
Conservative gain from Independent		Swing		

=== Dickleburgh ===
Dickleburgh
Party	Candidate	Votes	%	±%
Independent	H. Laws*	Unopposed		
Registered electors		1,132		
Independent hold				

=== Diss ===
Diss (3 seats)
Party	Candidate	Votes	%	±%
Independent	J. Speirs*	780		
Conservative	J. Scoggins*	662		
Conservative	D. Bell*	657		
Labour	J. Philip	495		
Turnout		~1,263	33.9	
Registered electors		3,723		
Independent hold				
Conservative hold				
Conservative hold				

=== Ditchingham ===
Ditchingham
Party	Candidate	Votes	%	±%
Conservative	N. Hood*	369	79.7	
Independent	C. Fairhead	94	20.3	
Majority		275	59.4	
Turnout		463	35.0	
Registered electors		1,353		
Conservative hold		Swing		

=== Forehoe ===
Forehoe
Party	Candidate	Votes	%	±%
Conservative	B. Cook*	Unopposed		
Registered electors		1,487		
Conservative gain from Independent				

=== Harleston ===
Harleston
Party	Candidate	Votes	%	±%
Liberal	S. Burton*	806	69.6	
Ind. Conservative	J. Mortimer	352	30.4	
Majority		454	39.2	
Turnout		1,158	54.7	
Registered electors		2,117		
Liberal hold		Swing		

=== Hempnall ===
Hempnall
Party	Candidate	Votes	%	±%
Independent	H. Sargent*	Unopposed		
Registered electors		1,198		
Independent hold				

=== Hingham ===
Hingham
Party	Candidate	Votes	%	±%
Conservative	H. Holman	458	59.1	
Labour	A. Lord	317	40.9	
Majority		141	18.2	
Turnout		781	59.6	
Registered electors		1,311		
Conservative gain from Independent		Swing		

=== Humbleyard ===
Humbleyard
Party	Candidate	Votes	%	±%
Conservative	V. Bullen*	338	76.1	
Labour	J. Halsey	106	23.9	
Majority		232	52.3	
Turnout		444	36.3	
Registered electors		1,238		
Conservative gain from Independent		Swing		

=== Kidner ===
Kidner
Party	Candidate	Votes	%	±%
Independent	S. Peacock*	Unopposed		
Registered electors		1,311		
Independent hold				

=== Long Row ===
Long Row
Party	Candidate	Votes	%	±%
Independent	T. Potter*	393	64.6	
Conservative	G. Goodall	215	35.4	
Majority		178	29.3	
Turnout		608	47.5	
Registered electors		1,281		
Independent hold		Swing		

=== Marshland ===
Marshland
Party	Candidate	Votes	%	±%
Conservative	P. Werry	347	50.2	
Labour	E. Rochford*	344	49.8	
Majority		3	0.4	
Turnout		691	50.5	
Registered electors		1,369		
Conservative gain from Labour		Swing		

=== Mergate ===
Mergate
Party	Candidate	Votes	%	±%
Conservative	G. Burdick	330	45.5	
Labour	H. Phillips	176	24.3	
Independent	P. Mickleburgh	171	23.6	
Independent	K. Hanton	48	6.6	
Majority		154	21.2	
Turnout		725	43.0	
Registered electors		1,695		
Conservative gain from Independent		Swing		

=== No. 19 (Costessey) ===
No. 19 (Costessey) (4 seats)
Party	Candidate	Votes	%	±%
Conservative	D. Whiskerd	1,363		
Conservative	H. Chapman	1,199		
Conservative	A. Moorhouse	1,168		
Independent	R. Dawson*	1,098		
Labour	A. Christie*	764		
Labour	J. Newman	709		
Independent	J. Briggs	690		
Labour	P. Bales	617		
Labour	J. Rackett	529		
Turnout		~2,269	34.0	
Registered electors		6,674		
Conservative gain from Labour				
Conservative gain from Independent				
Conservative gain from Labour				
Independent hold				

=== No. 2 (Wymondham) ===
No. 2 (Wymondham) (5 seats)
Party	Candidate	Votes	%	±%
Conservative	T. Turner	1,856		
Conservative	P. Hawkins	1,670		
Conservative	J. Davies	1,659		
Conservative	P. Ford	1,588		
Conservative	E. Capps*	1,526		
Labour	J. Chamberlain*	1,372		
Labour	R. Young*	966		
Labour	F. Fields*	927		
Labour	J. Muir	911		
Labour	R. Cobb	808		
Independent	A. Nickalls	465		
Liberal	D. Moore	426		
Liberal	R. King	379		
Independent	A. Wileman	222		
Turnout		~3,048	43.9	
Registered electors		6,942		
Conservative gain from Labour				
Conservative gain from Labour				
Conservative gain from Labour				
Conservative gain from Independent				
Conservative gain from Independent				

=== No. 28 (Rockland St. Mary) ===
No. 28 (Rockland St. Mary)
Party	Candidate	Votes	%	±%
Independent	C. Sewell*	Unopposed		
Registered electors		1,203		
Independent hold				

=== No. 29 (Thurton) ===
No. 29 (Thurton)
Party	Candidate	Votes	%	±%
Independent	L. Lester*	419	67.4	
Independent	M. Brown	203	32.6	
Majority		216	34.7	
Turnout		622	46.4	
Registered electors		1,346		
Independent hold		Swing		

=== Poringland With The Framinghams ===
Poringland With The Framinghams (2 seats)
Party	Candidate	Votes	%	±%
Independent	R. Sykes*	Unopposed		
Independent	T. Neil	Unopposed		
Registered electors		2,329		
Independent hold				
Independent gain from Conservative				

=== Scole ===
Scole
Party	Candidate	Votes	%	±%
Conservative	V. Alexander	Unopposed		
Registered electors		1,421		
Conservative gain from Independent				

=== Smockmill ===
Smockmill
Party	Candidate	Votes	%	±%
Independent	A. King	465	56.5	
Labour	J. Seddon	189	23.0	
Independent	M. Green	169	20.5	
Majority		276	33.5	
Turnout		823	50.3	
Registered electors		1,644		
Independent hold		Swing		

=== Springfields ===
Springfields
Party	Candidate	Votes	%	±%
Conservative	J. Easton	313	64.1	
Independent	J. Chapman*	104	21.3	
Labour	W. Carpenter	71	14.5	
Majority		209	42.8	
Turnout		488	47.8	
Registered electors		1,026		
Conservative gain from Independent		Swing		

=== Stratton ===
Stratton
Party	Candidate	Votes	%	±%
Independent	S. Harker*	432	70.2	
Ind. Socialist	R. Cooke	183	29.8	
Majority		249	40.5	
Turnout		615	37.5	
Registered electors		1,649		
Independent hold		Swing		

=== Tasvale ===
Tasvale
Party	Candidate	Votes	%	±%
Conservative	P. Starling*	Unopposed		
Registered electors		1,437		
Conservative gain from Independent				

=== Valley ===
Valley
Party	Candidate	Votes	%	±%
Liberal	H. Pagan	400	54.6	
Conservative	J. Orange-Bromehead	333	45.4	
Majority		67	9.1	
Turnout		733	49.2	
Registered electors		1,491		
Liberal gain from Independent		Swing		

=== Waveney ===
Waveney
Party	Candidate	Votes	%	±%
Conservative	M. Martin*	Unopposed		
Registered electors		1,454		
Conservative gain from Independent				

=== Westwood ===
Westwood
Party	Candidate	Votes	%	±%
Independent	N. Chapman*	Unopposed		
Registered electors		1,804		
Independent hold				

=== Wodehouse ===
Wodehouse
Party	Candidate	Votes	%	±%
Conservative	A. Cook*	Unopposed		
Registered electors		1,141		
Conservative gain from Independent				
