= 2015 South Norfolk District Council election =

2015 UK local government election

- 7 May 2015

All 46 seats to South Norfolk District Council 24 seats needed for a majority
| | First party | Second party |
|---|---|---|
| Party | Conservative | Liberal Democrats |
| Last election | 38; 57.2% | 8; 29.3% |
| Seats won | 40 | 6 |
| Seat change | ▲2 | ▼2 |
| Popular vote | 50,249 | 15,536 |
| Percentage | 54.2% | 16.8% |
| Swing | ▼3.0% | ▼12.5% |
- Map of the 2015 results in South Norfolk.
Party before election
Conservative
Elected Party
Conservative

The 2015 South Norfolk District Council election was held on Thursday 7 May 2015 to elect the whole council as part of 2015 United Kingdom local elections coinciding with the general election. The council continued to consist of 46 councillors and as immediately after the previous election, the council was controlled by local Conservatives, with local Liberal Democrats being the only opposition. The governing group's numbers were augmented by two councillors at the expense of that opposition group. Three defecting-from-majority independent councillors lost their council seats.

== Composition of council seats before election ==
After the 2011 election, 38 councillors were Conservatives and 8 were Liberal Democrats. Since then, three Conservative councillors had left the party's grouping. Two of them (Keith Weeks, Bressingham and Burston ward, and Jon Herbert, Mulbarton ward) now formed the South Norfolk Independent Group, while the third (Terry Blowfield, Stratton ward) sat as an independent.

| Party | Seats (2011 election) | Seats (19/03/15) |
|---|---|---|
| Conservative | 38 | 35 |
| Liberal Democrats | 8 | 8 |
| Independent | - | 3 |

== Candidates by party ==
44 / 46
39 / 46
35 / 46
13 / 46
12 / 46
1 / 46

South Norfolk had 36 wards, providing for 46 candidates. In this election, there were a total of 144 candidates standing (an increase of 23% from the 117 in the last election in 2011).

The two parties with incumbent councillors were the Conservatives and the Liberal Democrats. The Conservatives were standing in all wards, with a total of 44 candidates. The Liberal Democrats were standing 35 candidates in 32 wards.

Out of the other parties standing, Labour had 39 candidates in 32 wards, UKIP had 13 candidates in 13 wards, and the Green Party had 12 candidates in 12 wards. There was one independent candidate, Jackie Bircham, standing in Chedgrave and Thurton ward.

== Election results ==
South Norfolk local election result 2015
| Party | Seats | Gains | Losses | Net gain/loss | Seats % | Votes % | Votes | +/− |
|---|---|---|---|---|---|---|---|---|
| Conservative | 40 | 2 | 0 | +2 | 87.0 | 54.2 | 50,249 | -3.0 |
| Liberal Democrats | 6 | 0 | 2 | -2 | 13.0 | 16.8 | 15,536 | -12.5 |
| Labour | 0 | 0 | 0 | +/-0 | 0.0 | 19.4 | 17,993 | +11.5 |
| UKIP | 0 | 0 | 0 | +/-0 | 0.0 | 5.2 | 4,788 | +3.8 |
| Green | 0 | 0 | 0 | +/-0 | 0.0 | 4.3 | 3,982 | +0.4 |
| Independent | 0 | 0 | 0 | +/-0 | 0.0 | 0.2 | 144 | -0.1 |
| Total | 46 | | | | | | 92,692 | |

== Candidates by ward ==
South Norfolk council is made up of 46 councillors elected in 36 different wards. 27 wards elect one councillor, 8 wards elect two councillors, and one ward (Diss) elects three councillors.

29 incumbent councillors are re-standing in the wards they represented before this election (denoted by a *).

=== Abbey ward ===
South Norfolk District Council Elections 2015: Abbey ward
| Party | Candidate | Votes | % | ±% |
|---|---|---|---|---|
| Conservative | Robert James Savage* | 857 | 54.3 | −13.1 |
| Labour | Kevin Patrick O'Grady | 464 | 29.4 | +29.4 |
| Liberal Democrats | Patricia Margaret Dore | 258 | 16.3 | −16.3 |
| Majority | | 393 | 24.9 | −9.9 |
| Turnout | | 1579 | 69.09 | |
| Conservative hold | | Swing | | |

=== Beck Vale ward ===
South Norfolk District Council Elections 2015: Beck Vale ward
| Party | Candidate | Votes | % | ±% |
|---|---|---|---|---|
| Conservative | Clayton Hudson | 767 | 58.7 | +6.0 |
| Labour | Peter David Holmes | 198 | 15.2 | +15.2 |
| Green | Jillian Christine Callaghan | 172 | 13.2 | +13.2 |
| Liberal Democrats | Kerri Sheila Worrall | 169 | 12.9 | −34.4 |
| Majority | | 569 | 43.6 | +38.2 |
| Turnout | | 1306 | 69.91 | |
| Conservative hold | | Swing | | |

=== Bressingham and Burston ward ===
South Norfolk District Council Elections 2015: Bressingham and Burston ward
| Party | Candidate | Votes | % | ±% |
|---|---|---|---|---|
| Conservative | Barry Michael Stone | 863 | 51.2 | −21.9 |
| UKIP | Paul William Chambers | 326 | 19.3 | +19.3 |
| Labour | Jon Chambers | 286 | 17.0 | +17.0 |
| Green | David John Reynolds | 212 | 12.6 | +12.6 |
| Majority | | 537 | 31.8 | −14.3 |
| Turnout | | 1687 | 73.23 | |
| Conservative hold | | Swing | | |

=== Brooke ward ===
South Norfolk District Council Elections 2015: Brooke ward
| Party | Candidate | Votes | % | ±% |
|---|---|---|---|---|
| Conservative | John Charles Fuller* | 1104 | 68.4 | −5.7 |
| Labour | David Peter Andrew Boyce | 278 | 17.2 | +17.2 |
| Liberal Democrats | Judith Ann Tryggvason | 233 | 14.4 | −11.5 |
| Majority | | 826 | 51.1 | +2.9 |
| Turnout | | 1615 | 76.79 | |
| Conservative hold | | Swing | | |

=== Bunwell ward ===
South Norfolk District Council Elections 2015: Bunwell ward
| Party | Candidate | Votes | % | ±% |
|---|---|---|---|---|
| Conservative | Charles Henry Easton | 903 | 55.4 | −6.0 |
| Labour | Nigel Collingwood Crouch | 362 | 22.2 | −5.6 |
| UKIP | Frederick Joseph [sic] Page | 225 | 13.8 | +13.8 |
| Liberal Democrats | Ian Victor Spratt | 141 | 8.6 | −2.3 |
| Majority | | 541 | 33.2 | −0.5 |
| Turnout | | 1631 | 74.36 | |
| Conservative hold | | Swing | | |

=== Chedgrave and Thurton ward ===
South Norfolk District Council Elections 2015: Chedgrave and Thurton ward
| Party | Candidate | Votes | % | ±% |
|---|---|---|---|---|
| Conservative | Derek John Blake* | 688 | 45.8 | −11.6 |
| Labour | Harriet Ann Wells | 299 | 19.9 | +19.9 |
| UKIP | Ron Murphy | 243 | 16.2 | −3.1 |
| Independent | Jackie Bircham | 144 | 9.6 | +9.6 |
| Liberal Democrats | Christopher John Brown | 129 | 8.6 | −14.7 |
| Majority | | 389 | 25.9 | −8.1 |
| Turnout | | 1503 | 69.45 | |
| Conservative hold | | Swing | | |

=== Cringleford ward ===
South Norfolk District Council Elections 2015: Cringleford ward (2 seats)
| Party | Candidate | Votes | % | ±% |
|---|---|---|---|---|
| Conservative | Christopher John Kemp* | 1983 | 35.1 | +3.3 |
| Conservative | Garry Samuel Wheatley* | 1749 | 31.0 | +0.7 |
| Liberal Democrats | Paul Wynter Blathwayt | 981 | 17.4 | +8.0 |
| Labour | Peter James Reason | 937 | 16.6 | +6.0 |
| Majority | | 768 | 12.6 | |
| Turnout | | 5650 | 75.14 | |
| Conservative hold | | Swing | | |
| Conservative hold | | Swing | | |

=== Cromwells ward ===
South Norfolk District Council Elections 2015: Cromwells ward
| Party | Candidate | Votes | % | ±% |
|---|---|---|---|---|
| Conservative | Jack Henry Hornby | 713 | 51.3 | −3.1 |
| Liberal Democrats | Julian Lawrence Halls | 676 | 48.7 | +3.1 |
| Majority | | 37 | 2.7 | −6.0 |
| Turnout | | 1389 | 67.66 | |
| Conservative hold | | Swing | | |

=== Dickleburgh ward ===
South Norfolk District Council Elections 2015: Dickleburgh ward
| Party | Candidate | Votes | % | ±% |
|---|---|---|---|---|
| Conservative | Martin James Wilby* | 1043 | 68.5 | −5.6 |
| Labour | Pam Reekie | 223 | 14.7 | +0.7 |
| Green | Sam Morgan | 156 | 10.2 | +10.2 |
| Liberal Democrats | Anne Phebe Clifford John | 100 | 6.6 | −5.3 |
| Majority | | 820 | 53.9 | −6.2 |
| Turnout | | 1522 | 69.03 | |
| Conservative hold | | Swing | | |

=== Diss ward ===
South Norfolk District Council Elections 2015: Diss ward (3 seats)
| Party | Candidate | Votes | % | ±% |
|---|---|---|---|---|
| Conservative | Keith Walter Kiddie* | 1806 | 19.3 | +0.5 |
| Conservative | Graham Minshull | 1711 | 18.3 | −3.5 |
| Conservative | Tony Palmer* | 1692 | 18.1 | −3.1 |
| Labour | Chris Davison | 748 | 8.0 | +8.0 |
| Labour | Trevor James Clark | 729 | 7.8 | −2.2 |
| Green | Anthony David Milton | 646 | 6.9 | +6.9 |
| Labour | Scott Francis Huggins | 638 | 6.8 | +6.8 |
| Liberal Democrats | Fiona Jane Wenman | 570 | 6.1 | −5.5 |
| Liberal Democrats | David John Traube | 426 | 4.5 | +4.5 |
| Liberal Democrats | Trevor Leonard Wenman | 402 | 4.3 | −5.5 |
| Majority | | 944 | 10.1 | |
| Turnout | | 9368 | 61.50 | |
| Conservative hold | | Swing | | |
| Conservative hold | | Swing | | |
| Conservative hold | | Swing | | |

=== Ditchingham and Broome ward ===
South Norfolk District Council Elections 2015: Ditchingham and Broome ward
| Party | Candidate | Votes | % | ±% |
|---|---|---|---|---|
| Liberal Democrats | Brendon Bernard | 555 | 39.1 | −21.7 |
| Conservative | Keith Tilcock | 464 | 32.7 | −6.5 |
| UKIP | Tim Spurrier | 228 | 16.1 | +16.1 |
| Labour | Steve Pank | 172 | 12.1 | +12.1 |
| Majority | | 91 | 6.4 | −15.3 |
| Turnout | | 1419 | 71.3 | |
| Liberal Democrats hold | | Swing | | |

=== Earsham ward ===
South Norfolk District Council Elections 2015: Earsham ward
| Party | Candidate | Votes | % | ±% |
|---|---|---|---|---|
| Liberal Democrats | Murray Gray* | 720 | 48.4 | −17.9 |
| Conservative | Daniel Richard Cox | 521 | 35.0 | +1.3 |
| Labour | Geraldine Smith-Cullen | 248 | 16.7 | +16.7 |
| Majority | | 199 | 13.4 | −19.2 |
| Turnout | | 1489 | 72.67 | |
| Liberal Democrats hold | | Swing | | |

=== Easton ward ===
South Norfolk District Council Elections 2015: Easton ward
| Party | Candidate | Votes | % | ±% |
|---|---|---|---|---|
| Conservative | Margaret Dewsbury* | 943 | 60.2 | −18.2 |
| UKIP | Arthur Burkard | 239 | 15.3 | +15.3 |
| Labour | Sylvia Driver | 205 | 13.1 | +13.1 |
| Liberal Democrats | Anthony Lloyd Sumner | 179 | 11.4 | −10.2 |
| Majority | | 704 | 45.0 | −11.8 |
| Turnout | | 1566 | 74.28 | |
| Conservative hold | | Swing | | |

=== Forncett ward ===
South Norfolk District Council Elections 2015: Forncett ward
| Party | Candidate | Votes | % | ±% |
|---|---|---|---|---|
| Conservative | Barry Christopher Duffin | 702 | 42.5 | −2.3 |
| Liberal Democrats | Bob McClenning* | 555 | 33.6 | −21.6 |
| UKIP | Sharon Wentworth | 213 | 12.9 | +12.9 |
| Labour | Maisie Patricia Bellingham | 183 | 11.1 | +11.1 |
| Majority | | 147 | 8.9 | |
| Turnout | | 1653 | 75.12 | |
| Conservative gain from Liberal Democrats | | Swing | | |

=== Gillingham ward ===
South Norfolk District Council Elections 2015: Gillingham ward
| Party | Candidate | Votes | % | ±% |
|---|---|---|---|---|
| Conservative | Kay Mason Billig* | 790 | 48.6 | −9.7 |
| UKIP | Chris Capocci | 299 | 18.4 | +18.4 |
| Labour | Bethan Sian Gulliver | 297 | 18.3 | +18.3 |
| Liberal Democrats | Andrew Paul Barber | 238 | 14.7 | −27.0 |
| Majority | | 491 | 30.2 | +13.5 |
| Turnout | | 1624 | 70.31 | |
| Conservative hold | | Swing | | |

=== Harleston ward ===
South Norfolk District Council Elections 2015: Harleston ward (2 seats)
| Party | Candidate | Votes | % | ±% |
|---|---|---|---|---|
| Conservative | Brian Maurice Riches* | 1501 | 36.0 | +8.6 |
| Conservative | Jeremy Philip Savage* | 1106 | 26.5 | +3.0 |
| Labour | James Eddy | 672 | 16.1 | +16.1 |
| Liberal Democrats | Susan Evelyn Kuzmic | 509 | 12.2 | −5.7 |
| Labour | David Reekie | 380 | 9.1 | −1.2 |
| Majority | | 434 | 10.4 | |
| Turnout | | 4168 | 62.28 | |
| Conservative hold | | Swing | | |
| Conservative hold | | Swing | | |

=== Hempnall ward ===
South Norfolk District Council Elections 2015: Hempnall ward
| Party | Candidate | Votes | % | ±% |
|---|---|---|---|---|
| Conservative | Alison Mary Thomas | 1155 | 75.4 | +6.8 |
| Labour | Janet Susan King | 376 | 24.6 | +24.6 |
| Majority | | 779 | 50.9 | −13.7 |
| Turnout | | 1531 | 72.92 | |
| Conservative hold | | Swing | | |

=== Hethersett ward ===
Jacky Sutton stood as the Liberal Democrat candidate in Hethersett in 2011. Her vote-share here is compared with the performance of the Labour candidate in 2011.

South Norfolk District Council Elections 2015: Hethersett ward (2 seats)
| Party | Candidate | Votes | % | ±% |
|---|---|---|---|---|
| Conservative | David Bills* | 1878 | 32.2 | +0.2 |
| Conservative | Leslie George Poingdestre Dale* | 1671 | 28.7 | −0.1 |
| Labour | Jacky Sutton | 913 | 15.7 | −0.6 |
| Labour | Andy Pearson | 720 | 12.3 | +12.3 |
| Liberal Democrats | Colin Goodchild | 648 | 11.1 | 11.8 |
| Majority | | 758 | 13.0 | |
| Turnout | | 5830 | 43.53 | |
| Conservative hold | | Swing | | |
| Conservative hold | | Swing | | |

=== Hingham and Deopham ward ===
South Norfolk District Council Elections 2015: Hingham and Deopham ward
| Party | Candidate | Votes | % | ±% |
|---|---|---|---|---|
| Conservative | Yvonne Bendle* | 1049 | 63.2 | +0.6 |
| Liberal Democrats | Jeremy Dore | 326 | 19.6 | +6.4 |
| Labour | James Edward George Leman | 286 | 17.2 | +17.2 |
| Majority | | 723 | 43.5 | +5.0 |
| Turnout | | 1661 | 72.02 | |
| Conservative hold | | Swing | | |

=== Loddon ward ===
South Norfolk District Council Elections 2015: Loddon ward
| Party | Candidate | Votes | % | ±% |
|---|---|---|---|---|
| Conservative | Colin Leslie Gould* | 810 | 54.6 | −18.7 |
| Labour | David George Bissonnet | 322 | 21.7 | +21.7 |
| UKIP | Alan Baugh | 210 | 14.2 | +14.2 |
| Liberal Democrats | Peter John Arnold | 142 | 9.6 | −17.1 |
| Majority | | 488 | 32.9 | −13.8 |
| Turnout | | 1484 | 67.13 | |
| Conservative hold | | Swing | | |

=== Mulbarton ward ===
South Norfolk District Council Elections 2015: Mulbarton ward (2 seats)
| Party | Candidate | Votes | % | ±% |
|---|---|---|---|---|
| Conservative | Nigel Gordon Macdonald Legg* | 1650 | 31.9 | +0.9 |
| Conservative | Colin Wayne Foulger | 1502 | 29.0 | −2.5 |
| Labour | Elaine McKinna | 613 | 11.8 | +11.8 |
| Labour | Steve Sewell | 543 | 10.5 | +10.5 |
| Liberal Democrats | Margaret Grimmer Pitcher | 462 | 8.9 | −3.7 |
| Green | Roy Arthur Walmsley | 408 | 7.9 | −5.7 |
| Majority | | 889 | 17.2 | |
| Turnout | | 5178 | 73.13 | |
| Conservative hold | | Swing | | |
| Conservative hold | | Swing | | |

=== New Costessey ward ===
South Norfolk District Council Elections 2015: New Costessey ward (2 seats)
| Party | Candidate | Votes | % | ±% |
|---|---|---|---|---|
| Liberal Democrats | John Amis | 1137 | 26.5 | +4.3 |
| Liberal Democrats | Vivienne Bell | 1006 | 23.4 | +1.3 |
| Conservative | James Edward Burgess | 982 | 22.9 | +7.2 |
| UKIP | Michelle Paula Newton | 624 | 14.5 | +14.5 |
| Labour | Sarah Samantha Langton | 545 | 12.7 | +0.2 |
| Majority | | 24 | 0.5 | |
| Turnout | | 4294 | 67.40 | |
| Liberal Democrats hold | | Swing | | |
| Liberal Democrats hold | | Swing | | |

=== Newton Flotman ward ===
South Norfolk District Council Elections 2015: Newton Flotman ward
| Party | Candidate | Votes | % | ±% |
|---|---|---|---|---|
| Conservative | Phil Hardy | 722 | 48.8 | −6.8 |
| Labour | Jackie Brown | 316 | 21.4 | +21.4 |
| UKIP | Gillian Page | 254 | 17.2 | 17.2 |
| Liberal Democrats | Patricia Margaret McClenning | 188 | 12.7 | −31.7 |
| Majority | | 406 | 27.4 | +16.2 |
| Turnout | | 1480 | 68.89 | |
| Conservative hold | | Swing | | |

=== Northfields ward ===
South Norfolk District Council Elections 2015: Northfields ward
| Party | Candidate | Votes | % | ±% |
|---|---|---|---|---|
| Conservative | Joe Mooney* | 934 | 62.4 | −3.0 |
| Labour | Doug Underwood | 361 | 24.1 | −2.0 |
| Green | Gordon John Beckett | 202 | 13.5 | +13.5 |
| Majority | | 573 | 38.3 | −1.0 |
| Turnout | | 1497 | 66.64 | |
| Conservative hold | | Swing | | |

=== Old Costessey ward ===
South Norfolk District Council Elections 2015: Old Costessey ward (2 seats)
| Party | Candidate | Votes | % | ±% |
|---|---|---|---|---|
| Conservative | Andrew David Pond | 1606 | 26.0 | +9.2 |
| Liberal Democrats | Sharon Blundell | 1087 | 17.6 | −16.0 |
| Liberal Democrats | Libby Glover | 1019 | 16.5 | −16.3 |
| UKIP | Tom Burkard | 947 | 15.3 | +15.3 |
| Labour | Cliff Francis | 785 | 12.7 | +12.7 |
| Labour | Enid Williams | 740 | 12.0 | +12.0 |
| Majority | | 68 | 1.1 | |
| Turnout | | 6184 | 63.01 | |
| Liberal Democrats hold | | Swing | | |
| Conservative gain from Liberal Democrats | | Swing | | |

=== Poringland with the Framinghams ward ===
South Norfolk District Council Elections 2015: Poringland with the Framinghams ward (2 seats)
| Party | Candidate | Votes | % | ±% |
|---|---|---|---|---|
| Conservative | John Overton* | 1907 | 36.6 | −1.1 |
| Conservative | Lisa Sharon Neal* | 1763 | 33.8 | +0.2 |
| Labour | Nicola Jeannette | 790 | 15.2 | +1.1 |
| Liberal Democrats | Philippa Kathleen Grant | 753 | 14.4 | −0.1 |
| Majority | | 978 | 18.6 | |
| Turnout | | 5213 | 74.05 | |
| Conservative hold | | Swing | | |
| Conservative hold | | Swing | | |

=== Rockland ward ===
South Norfolk District Council Elections 2015: Rockland ward
| Party | Candidate | Votes | % | ±% |
|---|---|---|---|---|
| Conservative | Vic Thomson | 994 | 56.9 | −0.8 |
| Labour | Jo Bissonnet | 425 | 24.3 | +3.5 |
| Liberal Democrats | Ernest Joseph Green | 329 | 18.8 | +5.0 |
| Majority | | 569 | 32.6 | −4.3 |
| Turnout | | 1748 | 74.30 | |
| Conservative hold | | Swing | | |

=== Roydon ward ===
South Norfolk District Council Elections 2015: Roydon ward
| Party | Candidate | Votes | % | ±% |
|---|---|---|---|---|
| Conservative | David Goldson* | 869 | 67.9 | +1.8 |
| Labour | Elana Katz | 283 | 22.1 | +22.1 |
| Liberal Democrats | Bodo Ulrich David Rissmann | 127 | 9.9 | −24.0 |
| Majority | | 586 | 45.8 | +13.5 |
| Turnout | | 1279 | 68.15 | |
| Conservative hold | | Swing | | |

=== Rustens ward ===
South Norfolk District Council Elections 2015: Rustens ward
| Party | Candidate | Votes | % | ±% |
|---|---|---|---|---|
| Conservative | Peter Noel Broome | 1118 | 63.2 | +10.0 |
| Green | Katherine Jenkins | 651 | 36.8 | +23.4 |
| Majority | | 467 | 26.4 | −4.2 |
| Turnout | | 1769 | 65.58 | |
| Conservative hold | | Swing | | |

=== Scole ward ===
South Norfolk District Council Elections 2015: Scole ward
| Party | Candidate | Votes | % | ±% |
|---|---|---|---|---|
| Conservative | Jenny Wilby* | 900 | 66.5 | −1.5 |
| Labour | Andy Driver | 194 | 14.3 | +14.3 |
| Green | John David Seddon | 150 | 11.1 | +11.1 |
| Liberal Democrats | Brian Anthony Fookes | 110 | 8.1 | −6.5 |
| Majority | | 706 | 52.1 | +1.5 |
| Turnout | | 1354 | 70.02 | |
| Conservative hold | | Swing | | |

=== Stoke Holy Cross ward ===
South Norfolk District Council Elections 2015: Stoke Holy Cross ward
| Party | Candidate | Votes | % | ±% |
|---|---|---|---|---|
| Liberal Democrats | Trevor Lewis* | 757 | 43.7 | −6.6 |
| Conservative | Lizzie Meadows | 610 | 35.2 | +3.3 |
| Green | Julie Anna Young | 184 | 10.6 | −1.4 |
| Labour | Carol Ann Crouch | 182 | 10.5 | +10.5 |
| Majority | | 147 | 8.5 | −9.9 |
| Turnout | | 1733 | 75.69 | |
| Liberal Democrats hold | | Swing | | |

=== Stratton ward ===
Linden Parker stood as a Liberal Democrat candidate in Stratton in 2011.

South Norfolk District Council Elections 2015: Stratton ward (2 seats)
| Party | Candidate | Votes | % | ±% |
|---|---|---|---|---|
| Conservative | Des Fulcher | 1341 | 27.7 | −5.8 |
| Conservative | Kevin James Worsley | 1023 | 21.1 | −3.6 |
| UKIP | David Thornton | 750 | 15.5 | +15.5 |
| Labour | Lesley Jean Neave | 529 | 10.9 | −2.1 |
| Labour | Deborah Helen Sacks | 485 | 10.0 | +10.0 |
| Liberal Democrats | Shirley Ann Hagger | 371 | 7.7 | −9.0 |
| Green | Linden Parker | 343 | 7.1 | +7.1 |
| Majority | | 273 | 5.6 | |
| Turnout | | 4842 | 45.18 | |
| Conservative hold | | Swing | | |
| Conservative hold | | Swing | | |

=== Tasburgh ward ===
South Norfolk District Council Elections 2015: Tasburgh ward
| Party | Candidate | Votes | % | ±% |
|---|---|---|---|---|
| Conservative | Florence Ellis* | 921 | 61.6 | +1.8 |
| Labour | Michael Douglas Dawson | 318 | 21.3 | +21.3 |
| Liberal Democrats | Roger Neil Percival | 257 | 17.2 | −23.0 |
| Majority | | 603 | 40.3 | +20.8 |
| Turnout | | 1496 | 76.58 | 20.8 |
| Conservative hold | | Swing | | |

=== Thurlton ward ===
South Norfolk District Council Elections 2015: Thurlton ward
| Party | Candidate | Votes | % | ±% |
|---|---|---|---|---|
| Conservative | William Lewis Wilson Kemp* | 948 | 58.1 | +7.4 |
| Labour | Sally Laura Blaikie | 367 | 22.5 | +22.5 |
| Liberal Democrats | Claire Elizabeth Jackson | 316 | 19.4 | −4.5 |
| Majority | | 581 | 35.6 | +10.4 |
| Turnout | | 1631 | 72.27 | |
| Conservative hold | | Swing | | |

=== Town ward ===
South Norfolk District Council Elections 2015: Town ward
| Party | Candidate | Votes | % | ±% |
|---|---|---|---|---|
| Conservative | Lee Henry Hornby* | 1121 | 64.6 | +1.9 |
| Green | Jo Hardy | 615 | 35.4 | +35.4 |
| Majority | | 506 | 29.1 | −9.3 |
| Turnout | | 1736 | 69.39 | |
| Conservative hold | | Swing | | |

=== Wicklewood ward ===
South Norfolk District Council Elections 2015: Wicklewood ward
| Party | Candidate | Votes | % | ±% |
|---|---|---|---|---|
| Conservative | Michael Edney* | 869 | 54.9 | −4.7 |
| Green | Quentin John Logan | 243 | 15.4 | +15.4 |
| Liberal Democrats | Philip John Abbott | 241 | 15.2 | +1.8 |
| UKIP | Lesley Carruthers | 230 | 14.5 | +14.5 |
| Majority | | 626 | 39.5 | +0.8 |
| Turnout | | 1583 | 72.95 | |
| Conservative hold | | Swing | | |

== By-elections ==
Chedgrave and Thurton By-Election 24 September 2015
| Party | Candidate | Votes | % | ±% |
|---|---|---|---|---|
| Conservative | Jaan Larner | 260 | 53.5 | |
| Labour | Sarah Langton | 93 | 19.1 | |
| Liberal Democrats | Ernest Green | 69 | 14.2 | |
| UKIP | Ron Murphy | 64 | 13.2 | |
| Majority | | 167 | | |
| Turnout | | | | |
| Conservative hold | | Swing | | |
