= 2011 South Norfolk District Council election =

2011 UK local government election

- 5 May 2011

All 46 seats up for election 24 seats needed for a majority
	First party	Second party
Party	Conservative	Liberal Democrats
Last election	39; 56.0%	7; 37.0%
Seats won	38	8
Seat change	▼1	▲1
Percentage	57.2%	29.3%
Swing	▲2.1%	▼9.9%
- Map showing the winning party in each ward
Party before election
Conservative
Elected Party
Conservative

The 2011 elections to South Norfolk District Council were held on Thursday 5 May 2011 along with various other local elections around England, elections to the Scottish Parliament, National Assembly of Wales and Northern Ireland Assembly, and a referendum on whether to adopt the Alternative Vote electoral system for elections to the House of Commons. All 46 council seats were up for election. The previous council was controlled by the Conservatives, with the Liberal Democrats being the only opposition.

Both main parties had websites detailing their local manifesto pledges: Conservative pledges and record; Liberal Democrat manifesto and candidates.

== Composition of council seats before election ==
Party	Seats (2007 election)	Seats (March 2011)
Conservative	39	37
Liberal Democrats	7	7
Vacant	-	2

== Candidates by party ==
46 / 46 14 / 46 4 / 46	42 / 46 9 / 46 2 / 46

In this election, there were a total of 117 candidates contesting the 46 council seats. 25 Conservative councillors and 6 Liberal Democrat councillors were standing in the seats they held before the election. Both the Conservatives and Liberal Democrats fielded candidates in every ward, but the Liberal Democrats were unable to nominate candidates for every vacancy – a total of 46 Conservatives and 42 Liberal Democrats.

Out of the parties which are not represented on the district council, Labour stood 14 candidates, the Green Party 9 and UKIP 4. There were two independent candidates: Ingo Wagenknecht in Rockland ward and Jessica Austin in Wicklewood ward.

In 17 seats there was a straight fight between the Conservatives and Liberal Democrats.

== Election results: overview ==
South Norfolk local election result 2011
Party	Seats	Gains	Losses	Net gain/loss	Seats %	Votes %	Votes	+/−
Conservative	38	0	1	-1	82.6	57.2	33,647	+2.1
Liberal Democrats	8	1	0	+1	17.4	29.3	17,223	-9.9
Labour	0	0	0	0	0.0	7.9	4,672	+5.8
Green	0	0	0	0	0.0	3.9	2,313	+1.2
UKIP	0	0	0	0	0.0	1.4	823	+1.1
Independent	0	0	0	0	0.0	0.3	159	-0.1
Total	46						58,837	

The election saw 38 seats won by the Conservatives and 8 won by the Liberal Democrats – a gain of one seat for the Liberal Democrats. They won the seat for Forncett Ward, which had been vacant since the death of the Conservative councillor Hedley Smith in January 2011. The successful Liberal Democrat was previously the member for the ward from 2003 to 2007 defeated in 2007. Overall the Liberal Democrats polled a lower vote-share in South Norfolk overall. Their vote-share dropped by almost 10%, with half of the votes going to Labour and the rest to the Conservatives, the Green Party and UKIP.

Labour and the Greens attained a higher vote-share, with Labour overtaking the Greens as the third-largest party in terms of votes, but were unable to win any seats. Labour became the second-largest party in 8 wards: Bunwell, Cringleford, Dickleburgh, Rockland, Wymondham Northfields, Wymondham Rustens and Wymondham Town and Wicklewood – their best performance being 27.7% in Bunwell. The Greens came second in three wards Mulbarton, Hingham & Deopham and Thurlton pushing the Lib Dems into third place in those wards (all wards held by the Lib Dems in 2003). In Cringleford and Wymondham Rustens the Lib Dems finished in 4th place behind Labour and the Greens. UKIP managed to come second in Scole ward, with 17.41%.

== Results by ward ==
Candidates in bold were elected. Candidates marked with an asterisk were councillors in the same ward from 2007 to 2011.

=== Abbey ward ===
South Norfolk District Council Elections 2011: Abbey ward
Party	Candidate	Votes	%	±%
Conservative	**Robert Savage***	678	67.4	
Liberal Democrats	Peter Smith	328	32.6	
Majority		350	34.8	
Turnout		1006	45.69	
Conservative **hold**		Swing		

=== Beck Vale ward ===
South Norfolk District Council Elections 2011: Beck Vale ward
Party	Candidate	Votes	%	±%
Conservative	**Keith Tilcock***	491	52.7	
Liberal Democrats	Kerri Worral	441	47.3	
Majority		50	5.4	
Turnout		932	53.90	
Conservative **hold**		Swing		

=== Bressingham and Burston ward ===
South Norfolk District Council Elections 2011: Bressingham and Burston ward
Party	Candidate	Votes	%	±%
Conservative	**Keith Weeks***	787	73.1	
Liberal Democrats	Ashley Camm	290	26.9	
Majority		497	46.2	
Turnout		1077	49.6	
Conservative **hold**		Swing		

=== Brooke ward ===
South Norfolk District Council Elections 2011: Brooke ward
Party	Candidate	Votes	%	±%
Conservative	**John Fuller***	855	74.1	
Liberal Democrats	Judith Tryggvason	299	25.9	
Majority		556	48.2	
Turnout		1154	55.52	
Conservative **hold**		Swing		

=== Bunwell ward ===
South Norfolk District Council Elections 2011: Bunwell ward
Party	Candidate	Votes	%	±%
Conservative	**Beverley Spratt***	691	61.4	
Labour	Nigel Crouch	312	27.7	
Liberal Democrats	Rodney Myall	123	10.9	
Majority		379	33.7	
Turnout		1126	53.18	
Conservative **hold**		Swing		

=== Chedgrave and Thurton ward ===
South Norfolk District Council Elections 2011: Chedgrave and Thurton ward
Party	Candidate	Votes	%	±%
Conservative	**Derek Blake***	600	57.4	
Liberal Democrats	Peter Arnold	244	23.3	
UKIP	Ronald Murphy	202	19.3	
Majority		356	34.1	
Turnout		1046	50.49	
Conservative **hold**		Swing		

=== Cringleford ward ===
South Norfolk District Council Elections 2011: Cringleford ward (2 seats)
Party	Candidate	Votes	%	±%
Conservative	**Christopher Kemp***	1089	31.8	
Conservative	**Garry Wheatley***	1036	30.3	
Labour	Victoria Smillie	362	10.6	
Green	Jan Kitchener	359	10.5	
Liberal Democrats	John Peterson	323	9.4	
Green	Robert Pell	253	7.4	
Turnout		3422	51.1	
Conservative **hold**		Swing		
Conservative **hold**		Swing		

=== Cromwells ward ===
South Norfolk District Council Elections 2011: Cromwells ward
Party	Candidate	Votes	%	±%
Conservative	**Neil Ward***	461	54.4	
Liberal Democrats	Melvyn Elias	387	45.6	
Majority		74	8.8	
Turnout		848	44.25	
Conservative **hold**		Swing		

=== Dickleburgh ward ===
South Norfolk District Council Elections 2011: Dickleburgh ward
Party	Candidate	Votes	%	±%
Conservative	**Martin Wilby***	762	74.1	
Labour	Pamela Reekie	144	14.0	
Liberal Democrats	Paul Seeman	122	11.9	
Majority		618	60.1	
Turnout		1028	46.35	
Conservative **hold**		Swing		

=== Diss ward ===
South Norfolk District Council Elections 2011: Diss ward (3 seats)
Party	Candidate	Votes	%	±%
Conservative	**Glyn Walden***	1251	21.8	
Conservative	**Tony Palmer***	1220	21.2	
Conservative	**Keith Kiddie**	1078	18.8	
Liberal Democrats	Fiona Wenman	669	11.6	
Labour	Trevor Clark	574	10.0	
Liberal Democrats	Trevor Wenman	563	9.8	
UKIP	Evan Heasley	391	6.8	
Turnout		5746	39.57	
Conservative **hold**		Swing		
Conservative **hold**		Swing		
Conservative **hold**		Swing		

=== Ditchingham and Broome ward ===
South Norfolk District Council Elections 2011: Ditchingham and Broome ward
Party	Candidate	Votes	%	±%
Liberal Democrats	**Pauline Allen***	561	60.8	
Conservative	Sam Carter	361	39.2	
Majority		200	21.6	
Turnout		922	49.9	
Liberal Democrats **hold**		Swing		

=== Earsham ward ===
South Norfolk District Council Elections 2011: Earsham ward
Party	Candidate	Votes	%	±%
Liberal Democrats	**Murray Gray***	623	66.3	
Conservative	Jethro Elsden	317	33.7	
Majority		306	32.6	
Turnout		940	47.95	
Liberal Democrats **hold**		Swing		

=== Easton ward ===
South Norfolk District Council Elections 2011: Easton ward
Party	Candidate	Votes	%	±%
Conservative	**Margaret Dewsbury***	791	78.4	
Liberal Democrats	Allan Bedford	218	21.6	
Majority		573	56.8	
Turnout		1009	49.48	
Conservative **hold**		Swing		

=== Forncett ward ===
South Norfolk District Council Elections 2011: Forncett ward
Party	Candidate	Votes	%	±%
Liberal Democrats	**Bob McClenning**	664	55.2	
Conservative	Barry Duffin	539	44.8	
Majority		125	10.4	
Turnout		1203	56.18	
Liberal Democrats **gain** from Conservative		Swing		

=== Gillingham ward ===
South Norfolk District Council Elections 2011: Gillingham ward
Party	Candidate	Votes	%	±%
Conservative	**Kay Billig**	613	58.3	
Liberal Democrats	Mandy Smith	438	41.7	
Majority		175	16.6	
Turnout		1051	47.17	
Conservative **hold**		Swing		

=== Harleston ward ===
South Norfolk District Council Elections 2011: Harleston ward (2 seats)
Party	Candidate	Votes	%	±%
Conservative	**Brian Riches**	775	27.4	
Conservative	**Jeremy Savage***	666	23.5	
Liberal Democrats	Fran Pitt-Pladdy	589	20.8	
Liberal Democrats	Susan Kuzmic	508	17.9	
Labour	David Reekie	293	10.3	
Turnout		2831	42.23	
Conservative **hold**		Swing		
Conservative **hold**		Swing		

=== Hempnall ward ===
South Norfolk District Council Elections 2011: Hempnall ward
Party	Candidate	Votes	%	±%
Conservative	**Michael Windrige***	719	68.6	
Liberal Democrats	Fiona McDonald Clarke	329	31.4	
Majority		390	37.2	
Turnout		1048	52.00	
Conservative **hold**		Swing		

=== Hethersett ward ===
South Norfolk District Council Elections 2011: Hethersett ward (2 seats)
Party	Candidate	Votes	%	±%
Conservative	**David Bills***	1092	32.0	
Conservative	**Leslie Dale***	983	28.8	
Liberal Democrats	Jacky Sutton	781	22.9	
Labour	Laura Green	555	16.3	
Majority		202	5.9	
Turnout		3411	46.35	
Conservative **hold**		Swing		
Conservative **hold**		Swing		

=== Hingham and Deopham ward ===
South Norfolk District Council Elections 2011: Hingham and Deopham ward
Party	Candidate	Votes	%	±%
Conservative	**Yvonne Bendle**	729	62.6	
Green	Peter Eldridge	281	24.1	
Liberal Democrats	Lindsey Wright	154	13.2	
Majority		448	38.5	
Turnout		1164	50.19	
Conservative **hold**		Swing		

=== Loddon ward ===
South Norfolk District Council Elections 2011: Loddon ward
Party	Candidate	Votes	%	±%
Conservative	**Colin Gould***	649	73.3	
Liberal Democrats	Mary Quarmby	236	26.7	
Majority		413	46.6	
Turnout		885	44.47	
Conservative **hold**		Swing		

=== Mulbarton ward ===
South Norfolk District Council Elections 2011: Mulbarton ward (2 seats)
Party	Candidate	Votes	%	±%
Conservative	**Jon Herbert***	1018	31.5	
Conservative	**Nigel Legg***	1002	31.0	
Green	Roy Walmsley	441	13.6	
Liberal Democrats	Shirley Hagger	407	12.6	
Liberal Democrats	Margaret Pitcher	367	11.3	
Turnout		3235	46.59	
Conservative **hold**		Swing		
Conservative **hold**		Swing		

=== New Costessey ward ===
South Norfolk District Council Elections 2011: New Costessey ward (2 seats)
Party	Candidate	Votes	%	±%
Liberal Democrats	**Gerard Watt***	636	22.2	
Liberal Democrats	**Jan Hardinge**	633	22.1	
Conservative	Oliver Taylor	451	15.7	
Labour	Cid Gibbs	359	12.5	
Conservative	Vivienne Weeks	343	12.0	
Green	Ian Boreham	299	10.4	
Green	David Seddon	148	5.2	
Turnout		2869	39.29	
Liberal Democrats **hold**		Swing		
Liberal Democrats **hold**		Swing		

=== Newton Flotman ward ===
South Norfolk District Council Elections 2011: Newton Flotman ward
Party	Candidate	Votes	%	±%
Conservative	**Laura Webster**	536	55.6	
Liberal Democrats	Eve Domeyer	428	44.4	
Majority		108	11.2	
Turnout		964	47.93	
Conservative **hold**		Swing		

=== Northfields ward ===
South Norfolk District Council Elections 2011: Northfields ward
Party	Candidate	Votes	%	±%
Conservative	**Joe Mooney***	716	65.4	
Labour	Douglas Underwood	286	26.1	
Liberal Democrats	Pat Dore	93	8.5	
Majority		430	39.3	
Turnout		1095	47.56	
Conservative **hold**		Swing		

=== Old Costessey ward ===
South Norfolk District Council Elections 2011: Old Costessey ward (2 seats)
Party	Candidate	Votes	%	±%
Liberal Democrats	**Tim East***	1116	33.6	
Liberal Democrats	**Vivienne Bell***	1090	32.8	
Conservative	Caroline Savage	560	16.8	
Conservative	Ronald Smith	558	16.8	
Turnout		3324	36.37	
Liberal Democrats **hold**		Swing		
Liberal Democrats **hold**		Swing		

=== Poringland with the Framlinghams ward ===
South Norfolk District Council Elections 2011: Poringland with the Framlinghams ward (2 seats)
Party	Candidate	Votes	%	±%
Conservative	**John Overton***	1244	37.7	
Conservative	**Lisa Neal***	1110	33.6	
Liberal Democrats	Oliver Best	480	14.5	
Labour	Nicola Fowler	467	14.1	
Turnout		3301	50.22	
Conservative **hold**		Swing		
Conservative **hold**		Swing		

=== Rockland ward ===
South Norfolk District Council Elections 2011: Rockland ward
Party	Candidate	Votes	%	±%
Conservative	**Sue Thomson***	693	57.7	
Labour	Joanne Bissonnet	250	20.8	
Liberal Democrats	Daniel Scott	166	13.8	
Independent	Ingo Wagenknecht	92	7.7	
Majority		443	36.9	
Turnout		1201	52.10	
Conservative **hold**		Swing		

=== Roydon ward ===
South Norfolk District Council Elections 2011: Roydon ward
Party	Candidate	Votes	%	±%
Conservative	**David Goldson***	508	66.1	
Liberal Democrats	Paul Howling	260	33.9	
Majority		248	32.2	
Turnout		768	42.26	
Conservative **hold**		Swing		

=== Rustens ward ===
South Norfolk District Council Elections 2011: Rustens ward
Party	Candidate	Votes	%	±%
Conservative	**Colin Foulger**	436	53.2	
Labour	Sandra Underwood	185	22.6	
Green	Jo Hardy	110	13.4	
Liberal Democrats	Jerry Dore	88	10.7	
Majority		251	30.6	
Turnout		819	41.21	
Conservative **hold**		Swing		

=== Scole ward ===
South Norfolk District Council Elections 2011: Scole ward
Party	Candidate	Votes	%	±%
Conservative	**Jenny Wilby***	609	68.0	
UKIP	Roy Philpot	156	17.4	
Liberal Democrats	Brian Fookes	131	14.6	
Majority		453	50.6	
Turnout		896	47.50	
Conservative **hold**		Swing		

=== Stoke Holy Cross ward ===
South Norfolk District Council Elections 2011: Stoke Holy Cross ward
Party	Candidate	Votes	%	±%
Liberal Democrats	**Trevor Lewis***	635	50.3	
Conservative	Stella Rice	403	31.9	
Green	Jane Hutchings	151	12.0	
UKIP	Jeremy Kent	74	5.9	
Majority		232	18.4	
Turnout		1263	55.13	
Liberal Democrats **hold**		Swing		

=== Stratton ward ===
South Norfolk District Council Elections 2011: Stratton ward (2 seats)
Party	Candidate	Votes	%	±%
Conservative	**Terry Blowfield**	962	33.5	
Conservative	**Andrew Pond**	709	24.7	
Liberal Democrats	Alistair Miller	479	16.7	
Labour	Janet King	374	13.0	
Liberal Democrats	Linden Parker	344	12.0	
Turnout		2868	40.84	
Conservative **hold**		Swing		
Conservative **hold**		Swing		

=== Tasburgh ward ===
South Norfolk District Council Elections 2011: Tasburgh ward
Party	Candidate	Votes	%	±%
Conservative	**Florence Ellis**	636	59.8	
Liberal Democrats	Philippa Grant	428	40.2	
Majority		208	19.6	
Turnout		1064	55.91	
Conservative **hold**		Swing		

=== Thurlton ward ===
South Norfolk District Council Elections 2011: Thurlton ward
Party	Candidate	Votes	%	±%
Conservative	**William Kemp***	540	50.7	
Green	Derek West	271	25.4	
Liberal Democrats	Claire Jackson	255	23.9	
Majority		269	25.3	
Turnout		1066	46.87	
Conservative **hold**		Swing		

=== Town ward ===
South Norfolk District Council Elections 2011: Town ward
Party	Candidate	Votes	%	±%
Conservative	**Lee Hornby**	715	62.7	
Labour	Michael Crouch	277	24.3	
Liberal Democrats	Jane Walker	148	13.0	
Majority		438	38.4	
Turnout		1140	46.43	
Conservative **hold**		Swing		

=== Wicklewood ward ===
South Norfolk District Council Elections 2011: Wicklewood ward
Party	Candidate	Votes	%	±%
Conservative	Michael Edney	665	59.6	
Labour	Dominic Roskrow	234	21.0	
Liberal Democrats	Paul Blathwayt	149	13.4	
Independent	Jessica Austin	67	6.0	
Majority		431	38.6	
Turnout		1115	52.05	
Conservative **hold**		Swing		

== By-elections ==
New Costessey By-Election 2 May 2013
Party	Candidate	Votes	%	±%
Liberal Democrats	Katy Smith	659	52.8	
Labour	Cyril Gibbs	312	25	
Green	Ian Boreham	277	22.2	
Majority		347		
Turnout				
Liberal Democrats hold		Swing		
