= Architecture of the medieval cathedrals of England =

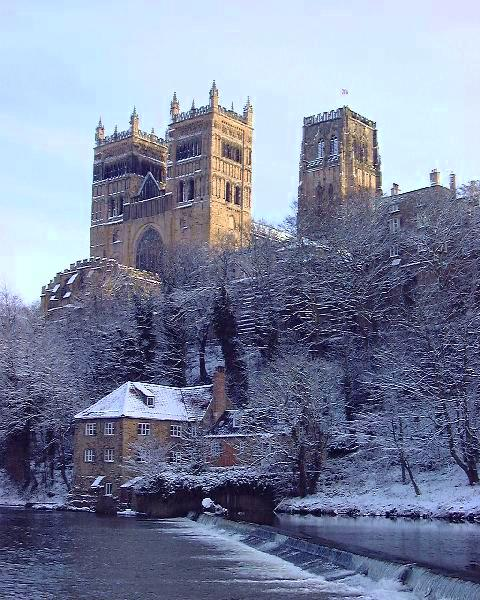
Durham Cathedral, above the River Wear.

The medieval cathedrals of England, which date from between approximately 1070 and 1540, are a group of twenty-six buildings that constitute a major aspect of the country's artistic heritage and are among the most significant material symbols of Christianity. Though diverse in style, they are united by a common function. As cathedrals, each of these buildings serves as central church for an administrative region (or diocese) and houses the throne of a bishop (Late Latin ecclēsia cathedrālis, from the Greek, καθέδρα). Each cathedral also serves as a regional centre and a focus of regional pride and affection.

Only sixteen of these buildings had been cathedrals at the time of the Reformation: eight that were served by secular canons, and eight that were monastic. A further five cathedrals are former abbey churches which were reconstituted with secular canons as cathedrals of new dioceses by Henry VIII following the dissolution of the monasteries and which comprise, together with the former monastic cathedrals, the "Cathedrals of the New Foundation". Two further pre-Reformation monastic churches, which had survived as ordinary parish churches for 350 years, became cathedrals in the 19th and 20th centuries, as did the three medieval collegiate churches that retained their foundations for choral worship.

While there are characteristics of each building that are distinctly English, these cathedrals are marked by their architectural diversity, both from one to another and also within each individual building. This is much more the case than in the medieval cathedrals of Northern France, for example, where the cathedrals and large abbeys form a relatively homogenous group and the architectural development can easily be traced from building to building.

One of the points of interest of the English cathedrals is the way in which much of the history of medieval architecture can be demonstrated within a single building, which typically has important parts constructed in several different centuries with no attempt whatsoever to make the later work match or follow through on an earlier plan. For this reason a comprehensive architectural chronology must jump backwards and forwards from one building to another. Only at one building, Salisbury Cathedral, is stylistic unity demonstrated.

== Background ==
=== Historical ===
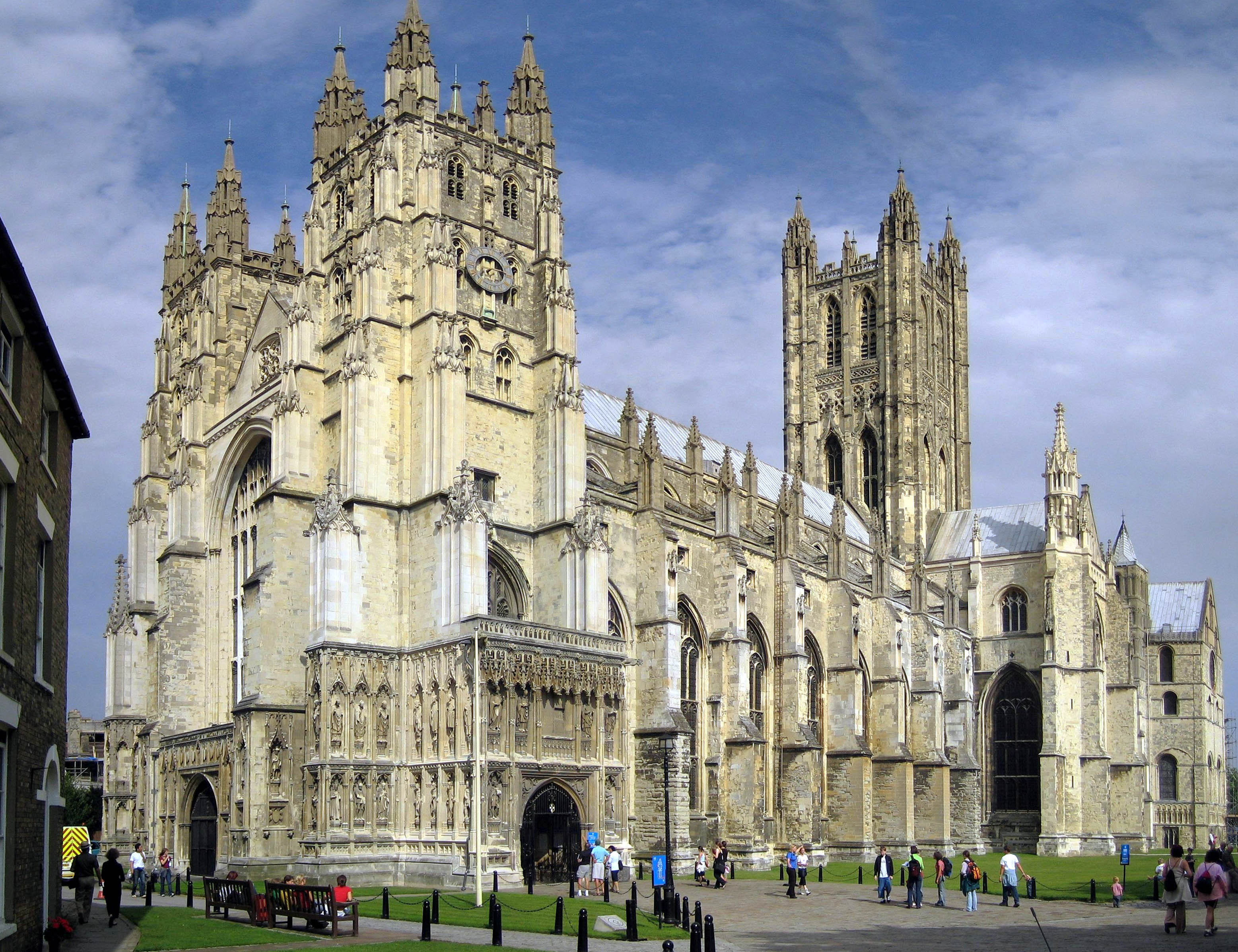
The See of Canterbury was founded in 597 by St. Augustine.

Christianity was carried to England by the Romans and spread throughout Britain, until the 5th century, when it waned through the departure of the Romans and the invasion by Saxons. In 597 Pope Gregory sent Augustine as a missionary from Rome to Canterbury where a church was established and run initially by secular canons, then Benedictine monks from the late Saxon period until 1540. The present cathedral church at Canterbury is the seat of the Archbishop of Canterbury, Primate of All England.

As begun by Alfred the Great in 871 and consolidated under William the Conqueror in 1066, England became a politically unified entity at an earlier date than other European countries. One of the effects was that the units of government, both of church and state, were comparatively large. England was divided into the See of Canterbury and the See of York under two archbishops. During the medieval period there were no more than 17 bishops, far fewer than the numbers in France and Italy.

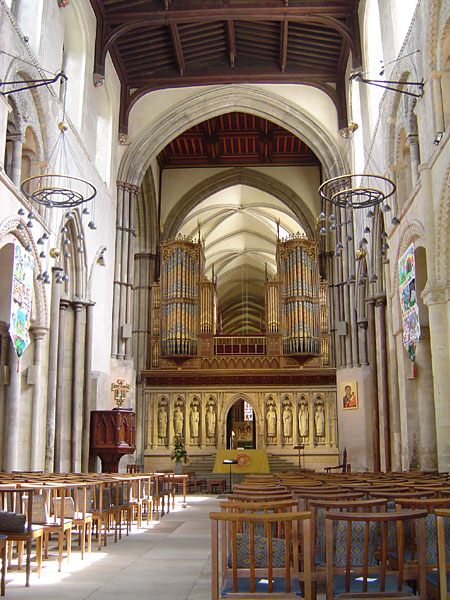
Rochester Cathedral was a foundation of secular canons from 604 to 1076, then Benedictine until 1540 when it reverted to a secular chapter.

Benedictine monasticism, present in England from the 6th century, was greatly extended after the Norman Invasion in 1066. There were also a number of Cistercian abbeys, but these were often in remote areas and not destined to become cathedrals. The Romanesque architecture of Normandy replaced that of Saxon England, the buildings being generally larger and more spacious, the general arrangement of monastic buildings following those of the great Abbey of Cluny. The Romanesque style, of which the English form is often known as Norman architecture, developed local characteristics.

At the Norman conquest, most English cathedrals were already richly endowed, and as major centres of Norman power they were then able to acquire further lands formerly held by dispossessed English landowners. Furthermore, the development of tithe as a compulsory tax on agricultural production resulted in greatly increased incomes for incumbent clergy. Although all cathedrals gathered donations from worshippers and pilgrims; in practice major building campaigns were largely, or entirely, funded from the accumulated wealth of the bishop and the chapter clergy. The availability of finance largely determined the speed of construction for major projects. When money was readily available, cathedral works could proceed with great speed. At Winchester, during the Norman period, an entire cathedral of unprecedented size begun in 1079 was built from scratch in less than 20 years (although the foundations were skimped, and the tower collapsed in 1107).

An important aspect in the practice of medieval Christianity was the veneration of saints, and the associated pilgrimages to places where particular saint's relics were interred and their tradition honoured. The possession of the relics of a popular saint was a source of funds to the individual church as the faithful made donations and benefices in the hope that they might receive spiritual aid, a blessing or a healing from the presence of the physical remains of the holy person. Among those churches to benefit in particular were St. Alban's Abbey (now cathedral), which contained the relics of England's first Christian martyr, Ripon with the shrine of its founder St. Wilfrid; Durham, which was built to house the body of Saints Cuthbert of Lindisfarne; and Aidan, Ely with the shrine of St. Ethelreda, Westminster Abbey with the magnificent shrine of its founder St. Edward the Confessor, at Chichester, the remains of St. Richard and at Winchester, those of St. Swithun.

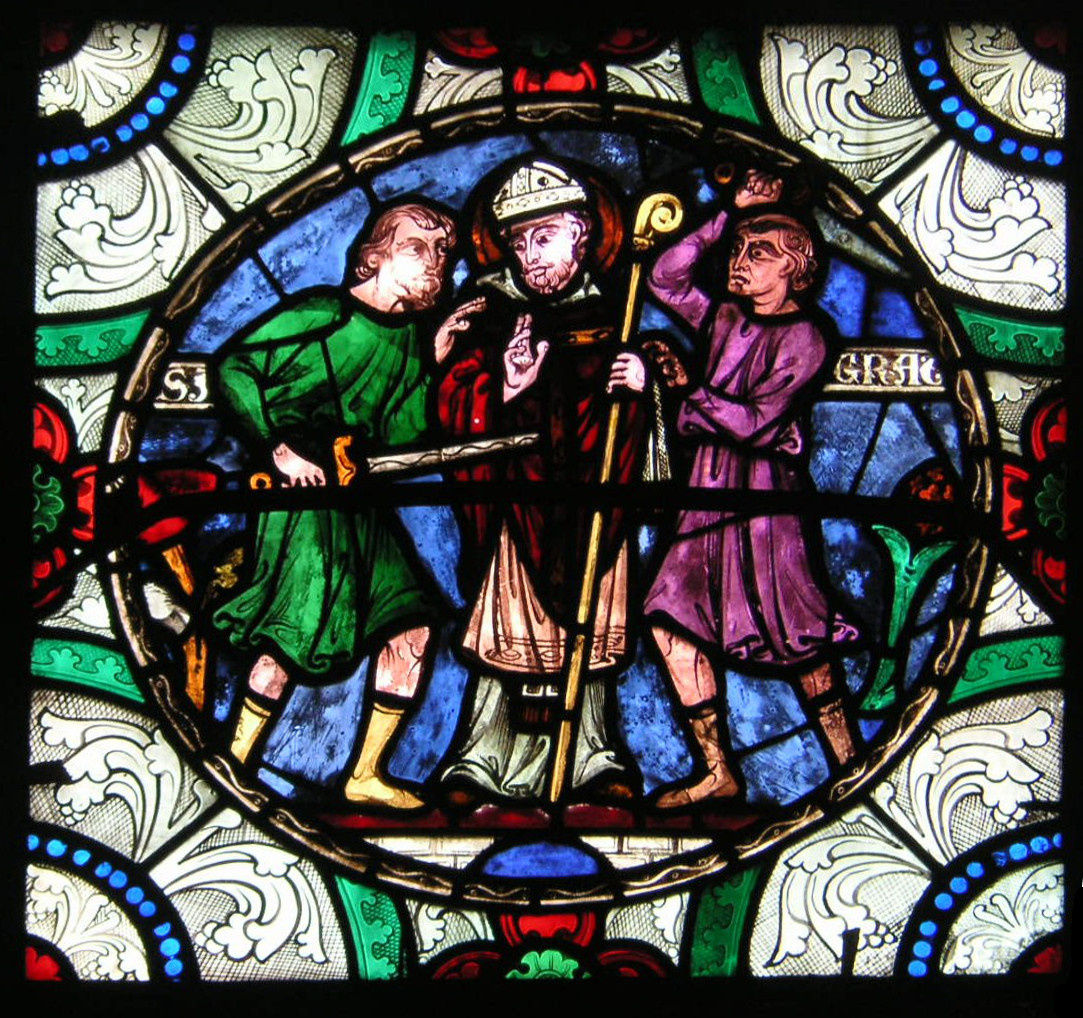
The relics of the murdered archbishop, Thomas Becket, brought great wealth to Canterbury Cathedral.

All these saints brought pilgrims to their churches, but among them the most renowned was Thomas Becket, the late archbishop of Canterbury, assassinated by henchmen of King Henry II in 1170. As a place of pilgrimage Canterbury was, in the 13th century, second only to Santiago de Compostela, and Canterbury's "pilgrim income was believed to be second only to Rome's".

In the 1170s Gothic architecture was introduced from France at Canterbury and Westminster Abbey. Over the next 400 years it developed in England, sometimes in parallel with and influenced by Continental forms, but generally with great local diversity and originality.

In the 16th century the Reformation brought about changes in the governance of the cathedrals as discussed below. Some existent buildings became cathedrals at this time. Several of the buildings were structurally damaged or left incomplete because of the Dissolution of the Monasteries, 1537–40. Many of the large abbey churches, particularly those outside the towns, were robbed, burnt out and abandoned. The late 16th and early 17th centuries saw repairs to the fabric of many cathedrals and some new building and stained glass as well as many new fittings.

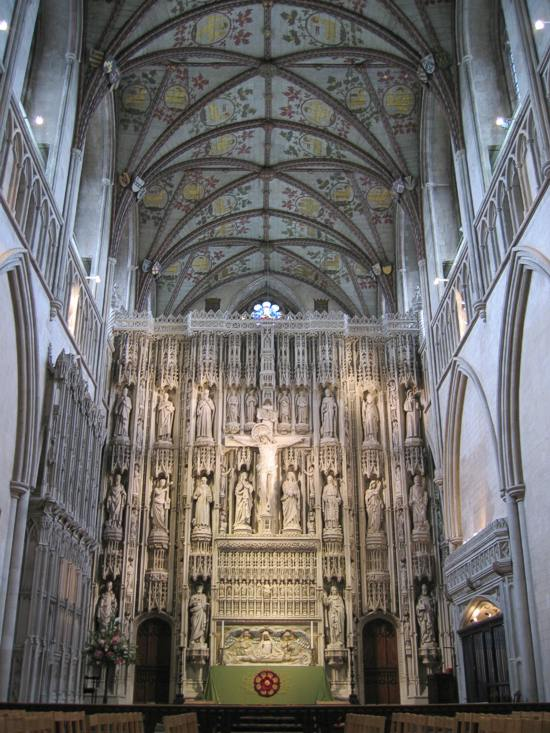
The reredos in St. Alban's Cathedral was severely damaged in the Dissolution of the Monasteries. It was reconstructed with new statues in 1888.

During the period of the Commonwealth, 1649–60, wholesale iconoclasm was wrought on all the pictorial elements of Christian buildings. Most of England's medieval stained glass was smashed. The majority of England's medieval statues were smashed or defaced leaving only a few isolated examples intact. Medieval paintings almost disappeared. Vestments embroidered in the famous style known as Opus Anglicanum were burnt. Those medieval Communion vessels that had escaped the Dissolution were melted down so that only about 50 items of pre-Reformation church plate remain.

The Restoration of the Monarchy in 1660 also brought about some restoration of churches and cathedrals such as that at Lichfield by Sir William Wilson, and their enrichment with new fittings, new church plate and many elaborate memorials. The loss of the ancient St. Paul's Cathedral in the Great Fire of London in 1666 meant that an entirely new cathedral, the present St Paul's, was built on its site to a design in the Baroque style by Sir Christopher Wren.

In general, from the time of the Reformation onwards, apart from necessary repairs so that buildings might remain in use, and the internal adornments of successive generations who wished to be commemorated, there was little building work and only piecemeal restoration. This situation lasted for about 250 years with the fabric of many major cathedrals suffering from neglect. The severity of the problem was demonstrated by the spectacular collapse of the spire of Chichester Cathedral, which suddenly telescoped in on itself in 1861.

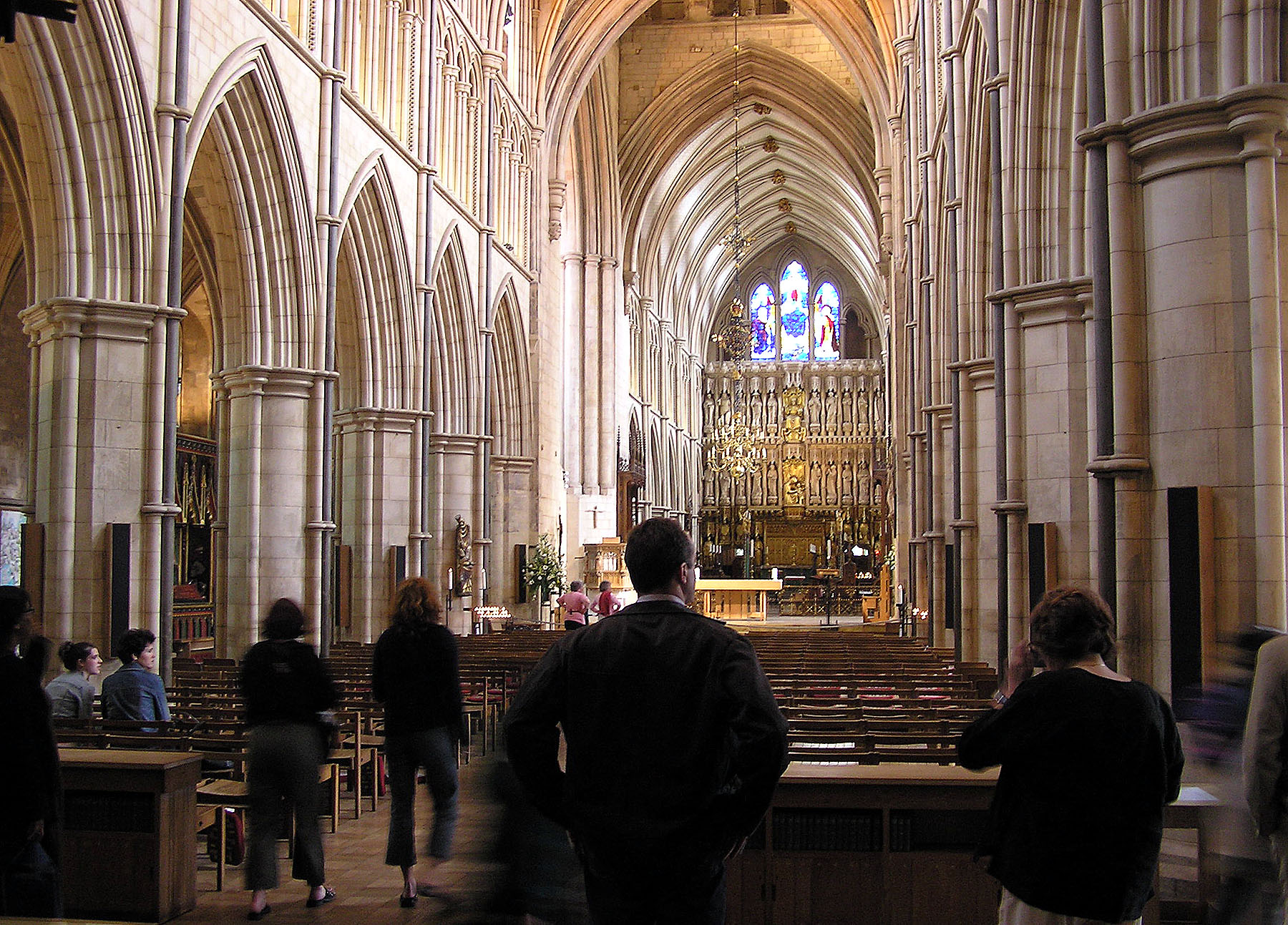
The nave of Southwark Cathedral was built by Arthur Blomfield in the 1890s.

By this date medieval architecture was back in fashion. A growing awareness of the value of England's medieval heritage had begun in the late 18th century, leading to some work on a number of the cathedrals by the architect James Wyatt. The consciousness accelerated until in the 1840s two academic groups, the Oxford Society and the Cambridge Camden Society both pronounced that the only suitable style in which to design a church was Gothic. The critic John Ruskin was an ardent advocate of all things medieval and popularised these ideas. The architect Augustus Welby Pugin, who designed mainly for the growing Roman Catholic Church, set himself to recreate not only the structural appearance of medieval churches, but also the richly decorated and colourful interiors that had been almost entirely lost, existing only as a painted screen here and there, a few tiled floors such as those at Winchester and Canterbury and the intricate painted wooden ceiling of Peterborough Cathedral.

The Victorian era saw the restoration of all of England's cathedrals and remaining major abbey churches. Some buildings left incomplete were completed at this time and the greater part of existent church furniture, fittings and stained glass dates from this period. The architects included George Gilbert Scott, John Loughborough Pearson, George Frederick Bodley, Arthur Blomfield and George Edmund Street.

=== Scope ===
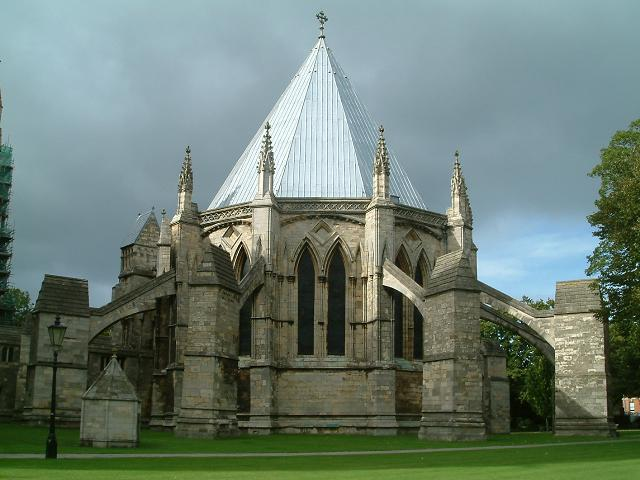
Lincoln Cathedral had a chapter of secular canons, for whom the earliest polygonal chapter house was built.

The 26 cathedrals described in this article are those of Bristol, Canterbury, Carlisle, Chester, Chichester, Durham, Ely, Exeter, Gloucester, Hereford, Lichfield, Lincoln, Manchester, Norwich, Oxford, Peterborough, Ripon, Rochester, St. Alban's, Salisbury, Southwark, Southwell, Wells, Winchester, Worcester and York with reference also to Westminster Abbey and the ancient cathedral of London generally known as Old St. Paul's.

All the medieval buildings that are now cathedrals of England were Roman Catholic in origin, as they predate the Reformation. All these buildings now serve the Church of England as a result of the change to the official religion of the country, which occurred in 1534 during the reign of Henry VIII.

The cathedrals fall into three distinct groups, depending on their earlier organisational structure. Firstly, there are those that, during the medieval period as now, were governed by a body of secular clergy or chapter, presided over by a dean. These cathedrals are Chichester, Exeter, Hereford, Lichfield, Lincoln, London, Salisbury, Wells, and York, all of which built specifically to serve as cathedral churches.

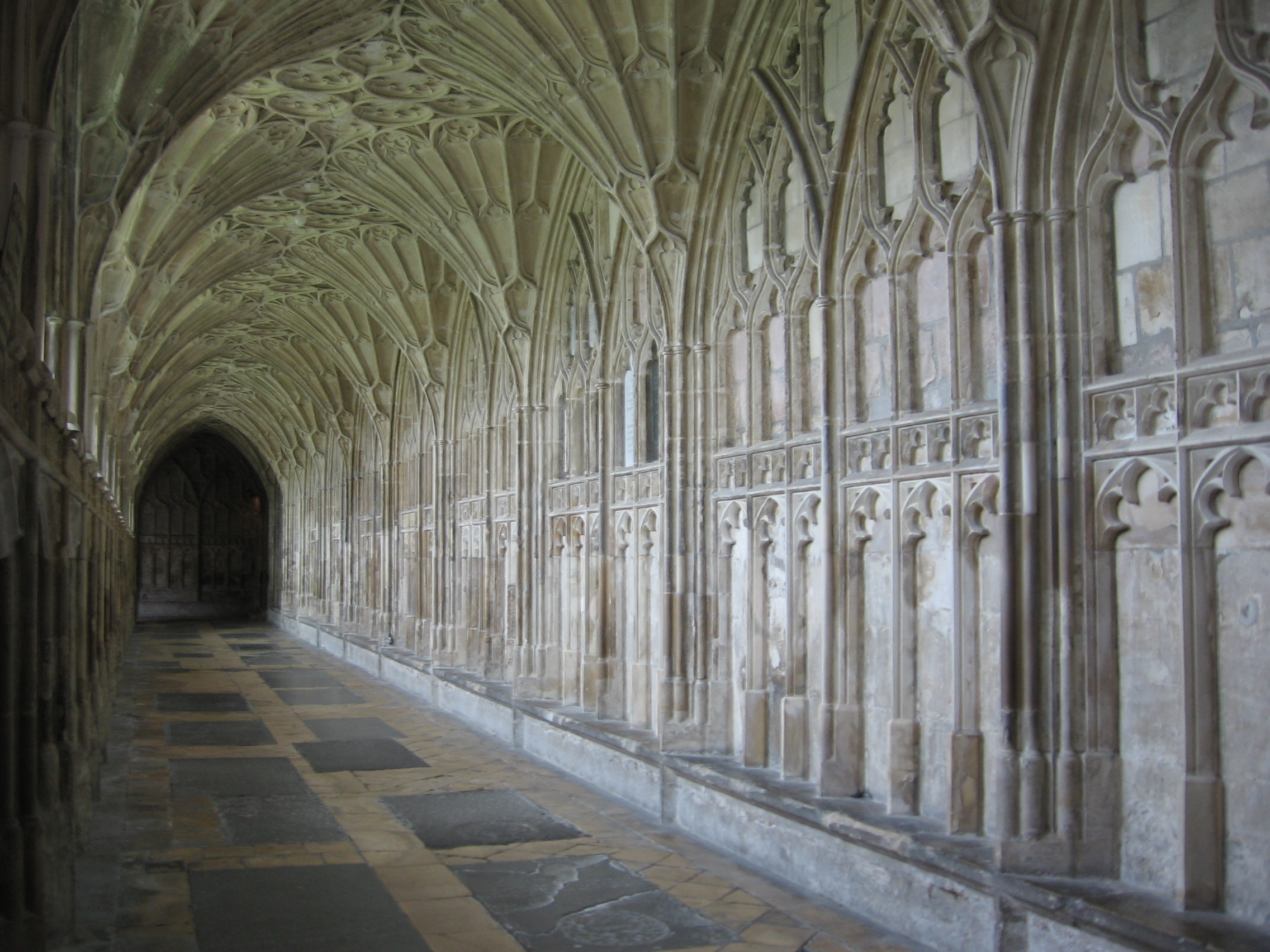
The fan-vaulted south range of the cloister at Gloucester Cathedral, which was a Benedictine Abbey from 1022 to 1539.

Secondly, there was a group of monastic cathedrals in which the bishop was titular abbot. These cathedrals are Canterbury, Carlisle, Durham, Ely, Norwich, Rochester, Winchester and Worcester. These monasteries were Benedictine except in the case of Carlisle, which was Augustinian. Six of these churches were built from the start as cathedrals. Carlisle and Ely are purely monastic churches, which then became the seat of a bishop during the course of construction. At the Dissolution of the Monasteries under Henry VIII, all the previously monastic cathedrals became governed by secular canons like the first group.

The third group are those churches established as new cathedrals since the Reformation. They include five great medieval abbey churches established as new cathedrals under Henry VIII: Bristol, Chester, Gloucester, Oxford, and Peterborough. Five further large churches later became cathedrals: St Albans and Southwark, which were of monastic foundation, and Manchester, Ripon, and Southwell, which were collegiate churches (and all of which consequently combine the functions of cathedral and parish church). Westminster Abbey was a Benedictine monastery that became a cathedral after the Dissolution of the Monasteries, but only for ten years.

Four other churches are associated with this tradition: St John the Baptist's Church, Chester, Old St. Paul's Cathedral, London, Bath Abbey and the destroyed Benedictine Abbey of Coventry. The collegiate church of St John in Chester was raised to cathedral status in 1075, but became a co-cathedral in 1102, when the see was removed to Coventry. The current building was probably begun around the time of the see's removal. St. Paul's, a cathedral with a secular chapter, was destroyed in the Great Fire of London in 1666 and was replaced by the present cathedral in the Baroque style designed by Christopher Wren. Bath Abbey was co-cathedral of the Diocese of Bath and Wells, along with Wells Cathedral. Although a large church, architecturally it does not fit the cathedral tradition, but has much in common with King's College Chapel, Cambridge and St. George's Chapel, Windsor. The abbey church at Coventry, was co-cathedral with Lichfield and St John Chester in the Diocese of Lichfield, but was destroyed at the Dissolution. The large parish church of St. Michael's, Coventry, became Coventry Cathedral in 1918. It was bombed during World War II, leaving intact only its spire, regarded as one of the finest in England. The new Coventry Cathedral designed by Sir Basil Spence was consecrated in 1962 and adjoins the shell of the ancient church.

=== Liturgical and organisational ===
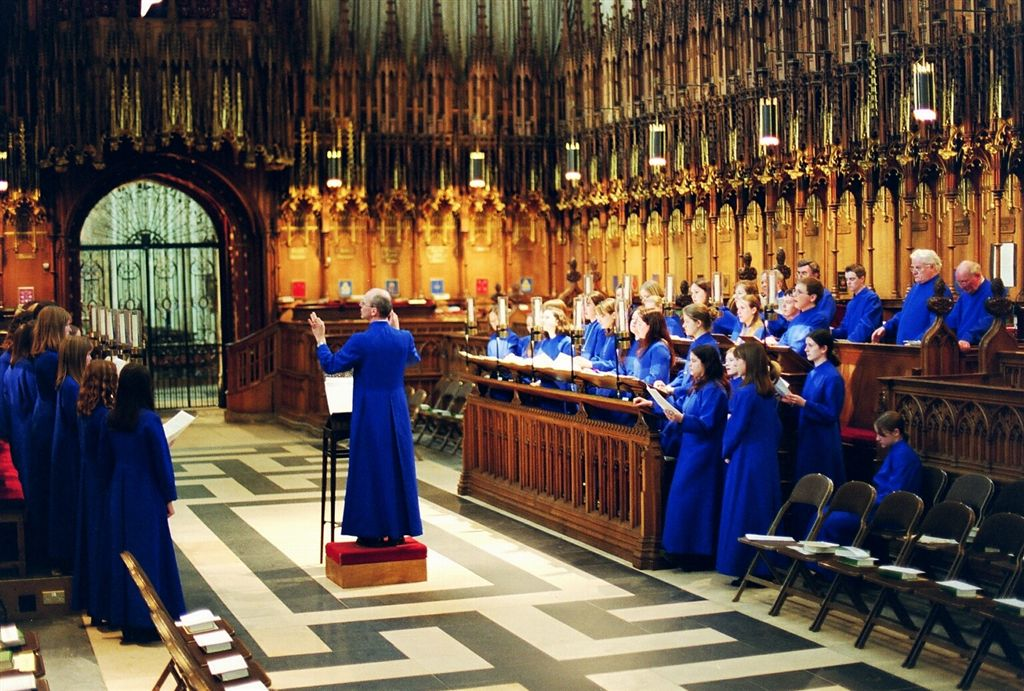
Choir practice at York Minster.

Cathedrals are places where the Christian rituals particular to a bishop, especially ordination and enthronement, can be performed, and are structured and furnished for these purposes. Each cathedral contains the seat of the local bishop, often literally a large throne. The bishop's throne is located towards the eastern end of the cathedral, near the high altar, which is main focus of worship. On the altar is served the Eucharist, a symbolic meal of bread and wine in memory of Jesus' Last Supper with his disciples. In the early medieval period, the altar always contained, or was associated with, the relics of a saint. Sometimes the relics were held in a separate shrine, near the high altar. In this part of the church are often located the tombs of former bishops, typically arranged either side of the major shrine, so the worshipping congregation symbolically comprised the whole body of clergy of the diocese, both living and dead, in communion with their patron saint. Seats are provided for the other significant clergy of the cathedral: the dean who is the foremost priest at the cathedral, the precentor, sacristan, archdeacon and canons.

Each of these priests, either as secular clergy, or as previously, members of a religious order, is obligated to say the "Holy Office" every day. To this end, cathedrals normally have a number of small chapels used for private devotion or for small groups. In England there is a strong tradition that each chapel should face the east. For this reason the transepts of English cathedrals are longer than those in most other countries, and there is often a second transept, as at Salisbury. This arrangement permits a greater number of eastward-facing chapels. That part of the main interior which is furthest to the east and reserved for the prayers of the clergy is the presbytery.

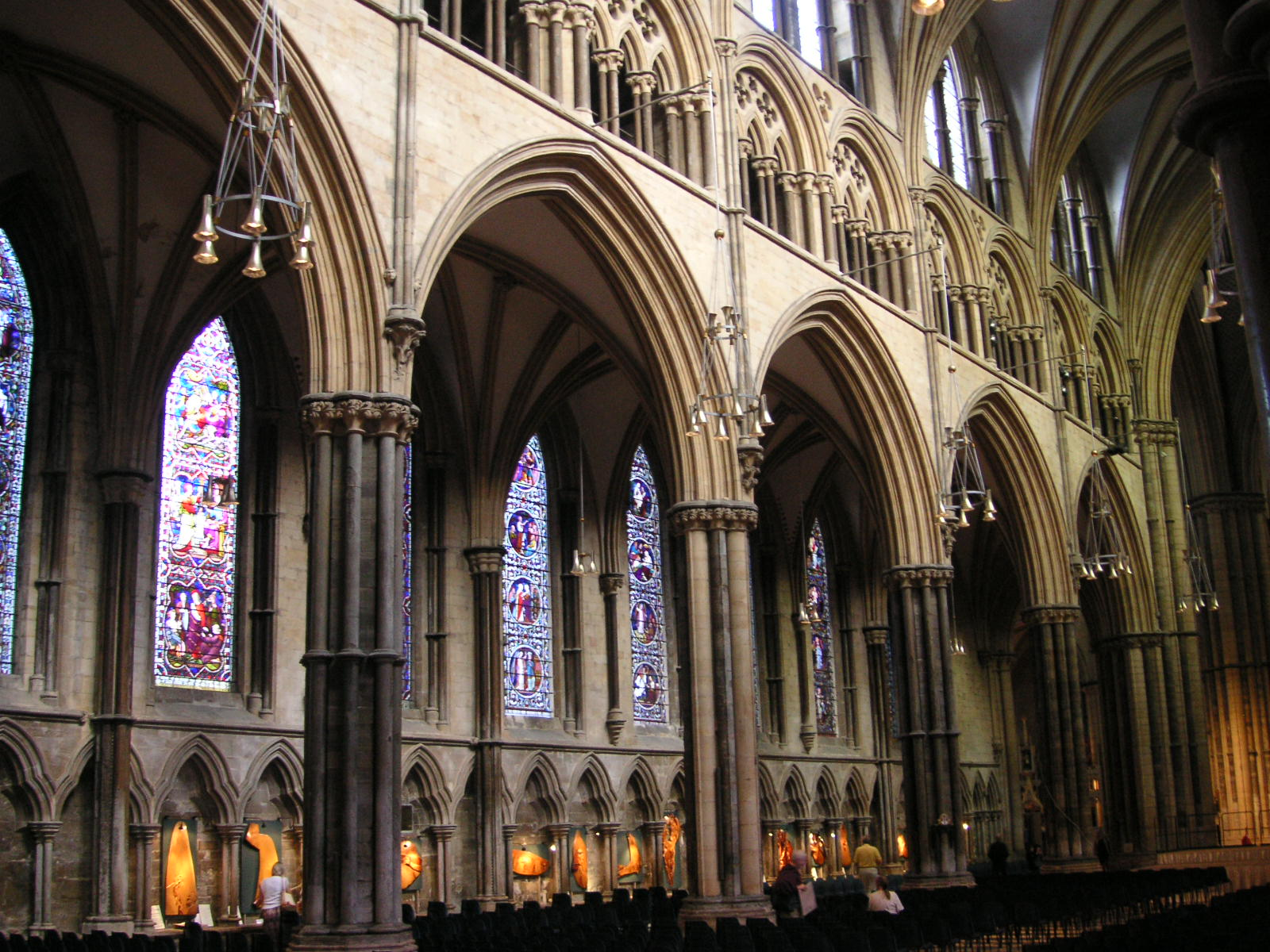
The nave of Lincoln Cathedral

English cathedrals maintain a traditional form of church service, of which canticles, the set psalm of the day, responses, and an anthem are sung by a choir traditionally composed of about thirty men and boys. (Many cathedrals now also have a girls choir, and a lay choir). Because of this tradition, that part of the building that contains the stalls, usually to the east of the central tower but sometimes extending under it, is called the choir or quire. The choir is sometimes divided from the nave of the cathedral by a wide late medieval pulpitum screen constructed of stone and in some instances carrying a large pipe organ, notably at Exeter, Gloucester, Lincoln, Norwich, Rochester, St Albans, Southwell, Wells and York. This screen traditionally separated the quire from the nave and the clergy from the laity, who except on special occasions were expected to worship at parish churches, rather than at the cathedral. The nave of the cathedral, in medieval times, was used primarily for processions. At its western end it contains the font for the ritual washing service of Baptism, at which a person, most often an infant, is symbolically accepted into the church. The font is usually made of stone and is usually the oldest fitting in the cathedral, many of them being Norman. The elaborate wooden font-covers, raised by ropes and pulleys when the font was needed, that most acquired in the later Middle Ages were a favourite target of Protestant iconoclasts, and rarely survive.

Since the Reformation, the nave is that part of the building which is usually open to and most used by the congregation and general public. There is also, usually in the nave, a raised pulpit from which the dean or other clergy can expound the scriptures. In the late 20th century it became customary in some cathedrals for an hourly prayer to be said, for the benefit of visitors, and this is often presented from the nave pulpit. In a large cathedral, particularly in those where the building is divided by a screen, as at Canterbury, a modern altar may be set at the eastern end of the nave so that services might be held there for large congregations. At each place where services are held there is a lectern on which rests a Bible.

== General characteristics of English cathedrals ==
Note: all the dimensions are those given by John Harvey unless otherwise cited. The periods and style names are those used by Banister Fletcher and others, based on Rickman and Sharpe.

=== Plan and section ===
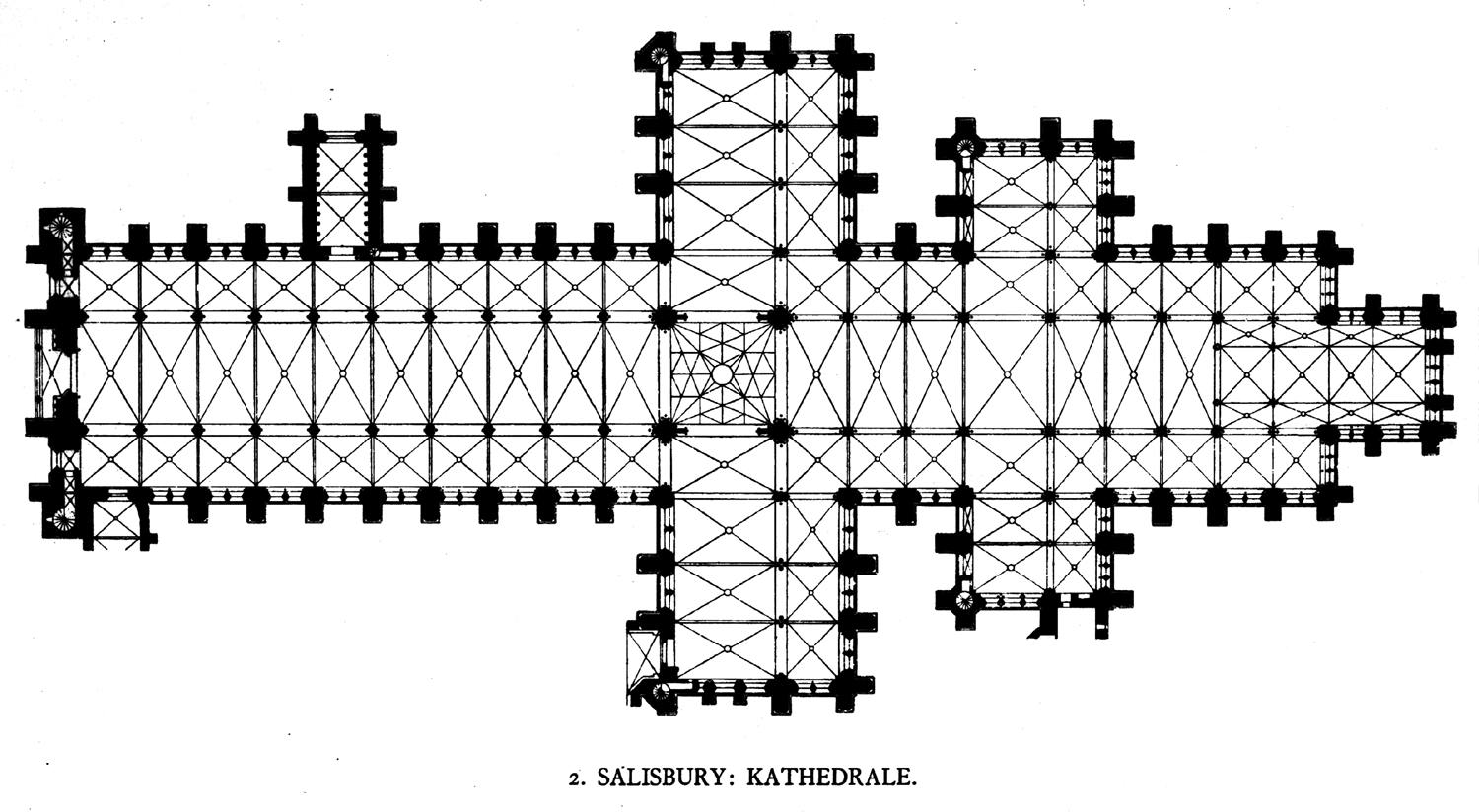
The plan of Salisbury Cathedral shows many features that are typically English.

Like the majority of medieval cathedrals, those of England are cruciform. While most are of the Latin Cross shape with a single transept, several including Salisbury, Lincoln, Wells and Canterbury have two transepts, which is a distinctly English characteristic. The transepts, unlike those of many French cathedrals, always project strongly. The cathedral, whether of monastic or secular foundation, often has several clearly defined subsidiary buildings, in particular the chapter house and cloister.

With two exceptions, the naves and eastern arms of the cathedrals have single lower aisles on either side with a clerestory that illuminates the central space. At Bristol the aisles are at the same height as the medieval choir like some German cathedrals, and at Chichester there are two aisles on either side of the nave like some French cathedrals. At a number of the cathedrals where the transepts are large they also have aisles, either on the eastern side as at Peterborough, Durham, Lincoln and Salisbury or both, as at Wells, Winchester, Ely and York. Winchester and Ely additionally have a third aisle at the end of both transepts.

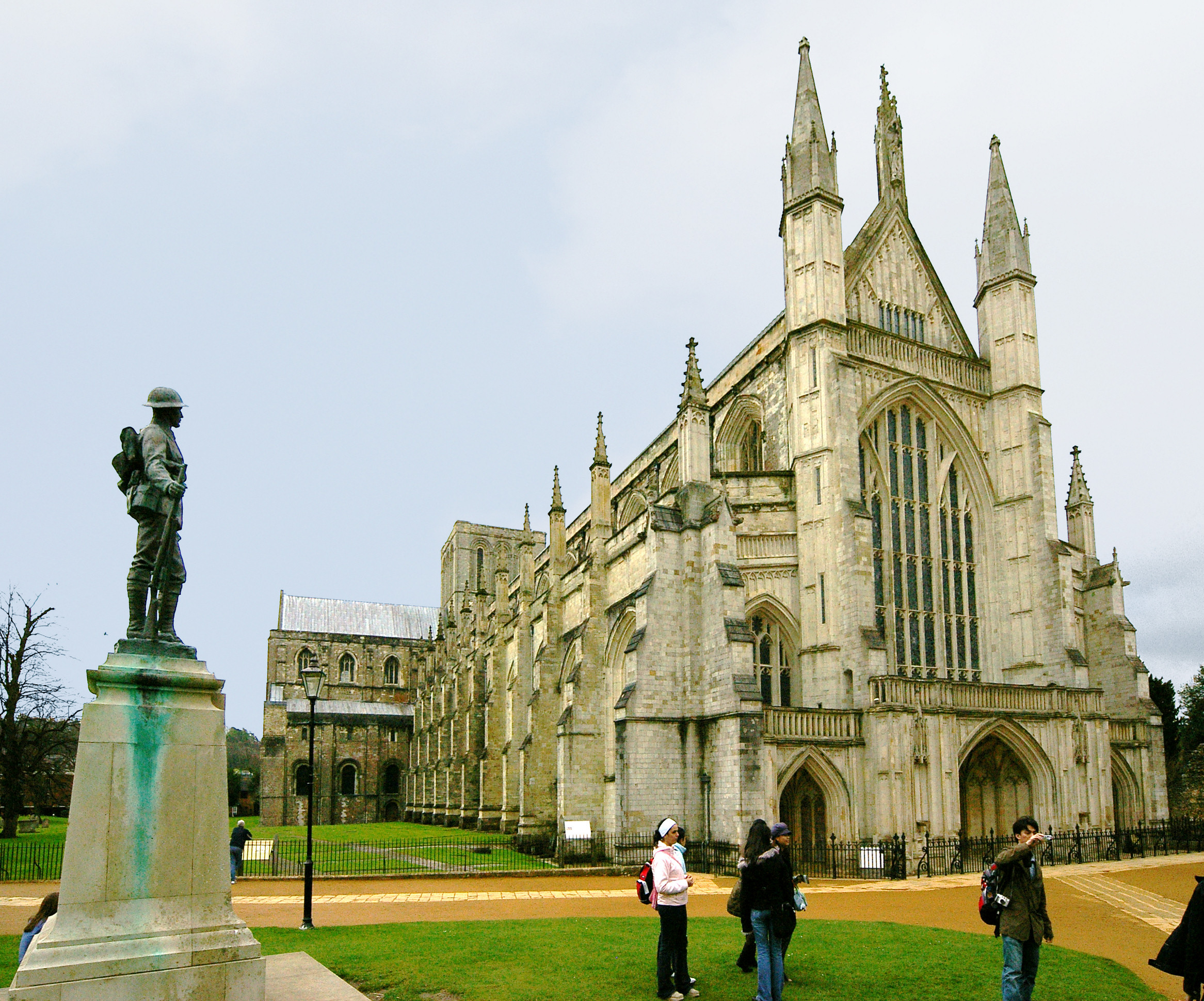
Winchester Cathedral is the longest medieval church in the world, at 169 metres (554 ft).

=== Length ===
The nave and sometimes the eastern arm are often of great length by comparison with the medieval cathedrals of other countries. Seven of the twenty-five English cathedrals—Canterbury, Durham, Ely, Lincoln, St Albans, Winchester and York—exceed 150 metres (being between 509 and 554 feet (155 and 169 m)), and are only equalled by the cathedrals of Milan and Florence. Another nine of the cathedrals—Norwich, Peterborough, Salisbury, Worcester, Gloucester, Wells, Exeter, Chichester, and Lichfield—are between 397 and 481 feet (121 and 147 m) long. By comparison, the largest cathedrals of Northern France, Notre Dame de Paris, Amiens, Rouen, Reims and Chartres, are all about 135–140 metres in length, as is Cologne in Germany. The longest cathedrals of Spain, including Seville, which has the largest floor area of any medieval church, are about 120 metres. Five English cathedrals: Chester, Hereford, Rochester, Southwell, and Ripon are between 318 and 371 feet (97 and 113 m) in length. The last four cathedrals all, for various reasons, either have no medieval nave or only a few remaining bays. At Bristol and Southwark the naves were built in the Victorian era, leaving Carlisle and Oxford, with naves of only two and four bays respectively, as the smallest of England's ancient cathedrals at 73 metres (240 ft) and 57 metres (187 ft).

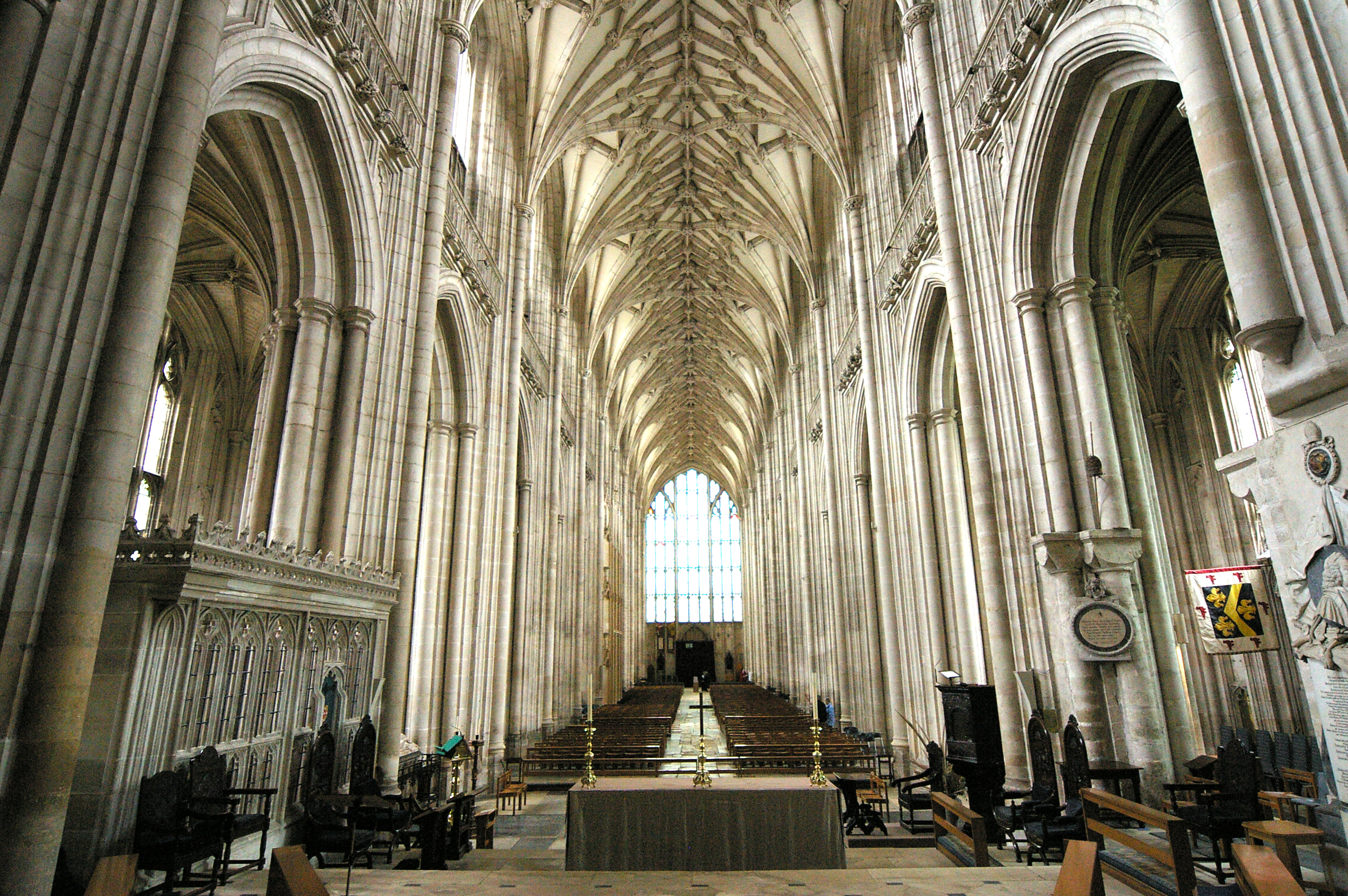
The nave of Winchester, gives an impression of height as well as length, but at 24 metres (78 ft) it is half the height of Beauvais Cathedral in northern France.

=== Height ===
By contrast with their tendency towards extreme length, the vaults of English cathedrals are low compared with many of those found in other countries. The highest medieval stone vault in England is at Westminster Abbey at 102 feet (31 m), that at York Minster being of the same height but despite its appearance, not actually of stone, but wood. The majority of English cathedrals have vaults ranging in height from 20 to 26 metres (66 to 85 ft). These contrast with cathedrals such as Beauvais, Amiens and Cologne with internal heights of over 42 metres (138 ft).

=== Towers ===
An important feature of English cathedrals, uncommon elsewhere except in Normandy, is the large and often elaborate square central tower over the crossing. The larger of these towers range from 55 metres (180 ft) at Wells to 83 metres (271 ft) at Lincoln. The central tower may exist as a single feature as at Salisbury, Gloucester, Worcester, Norwich and Chichester or in combination with paired towers at the west front as at York, Lincoln, Canterbury, Durham and Wells. Among the cathedrals that have three towers, the central tower is usually the tallest. At Southwell the two western towers are capped by pyramidal spires sheathed in lead.

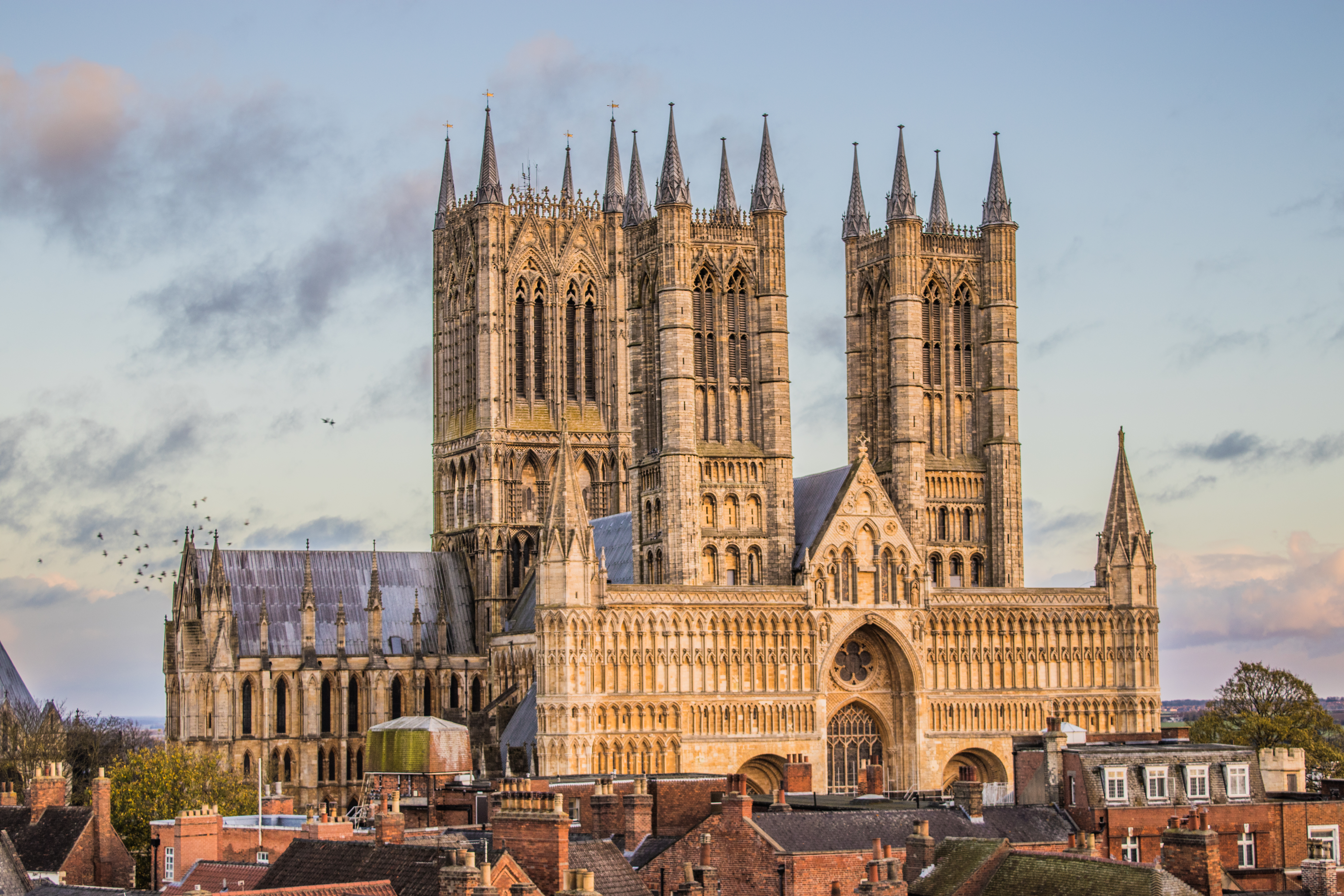
Lincoln Cathedral has three towers, with the central tower 83 metres (272 ft).

Tall Gothic central spires remain at Salisbury and Norwich, that at Chichester having been rebuilt in the 19th century after its collapse. The spire of Salisbury at 404 feet (123 m) is the tallest in Britain. It is also the tallest 14th-century spire and the tallest ashlar masonry spire (in contrast to the openwork spires of Germany and France). However, it was greatly surpassed in height by the spires of Lincoln and Old St. Paul's. At Lincoln, between the early 14th century and 1548, the central tower was surmounted by the tallest spire in the world at about 170 metres (557 ft) but this fell in a storm in 1547. At Lichfield Cathedral, uniquely among English cathedrals, three medieval masonry spires have all survived.

Although single western towers are common in English parish churches, only one medieval cathedral, Ely, retains a centrally placed western tower, and in that case, it was framed by two lower lateral towers, one of which has since fallen down. (Note: Hereford Cathedral also had a single western tower, as well as its central tower. The western tower fell in 1786.) Ely, alone among England's cathedrals, has a central feature over the crossing that somewhat resembles the polygonal vaulted lantern towers of Spain. This elaborate lantern-like structure known as "The Octagon" spans both the nave and aisles, and is thus said to have inspired Christopher Wren's design for the dome of St. Paul's Cathedral. Its upper parts are supported by hidden wooden hammer-beams, an architectural device unique to English Gothic.

=== West fronts ===
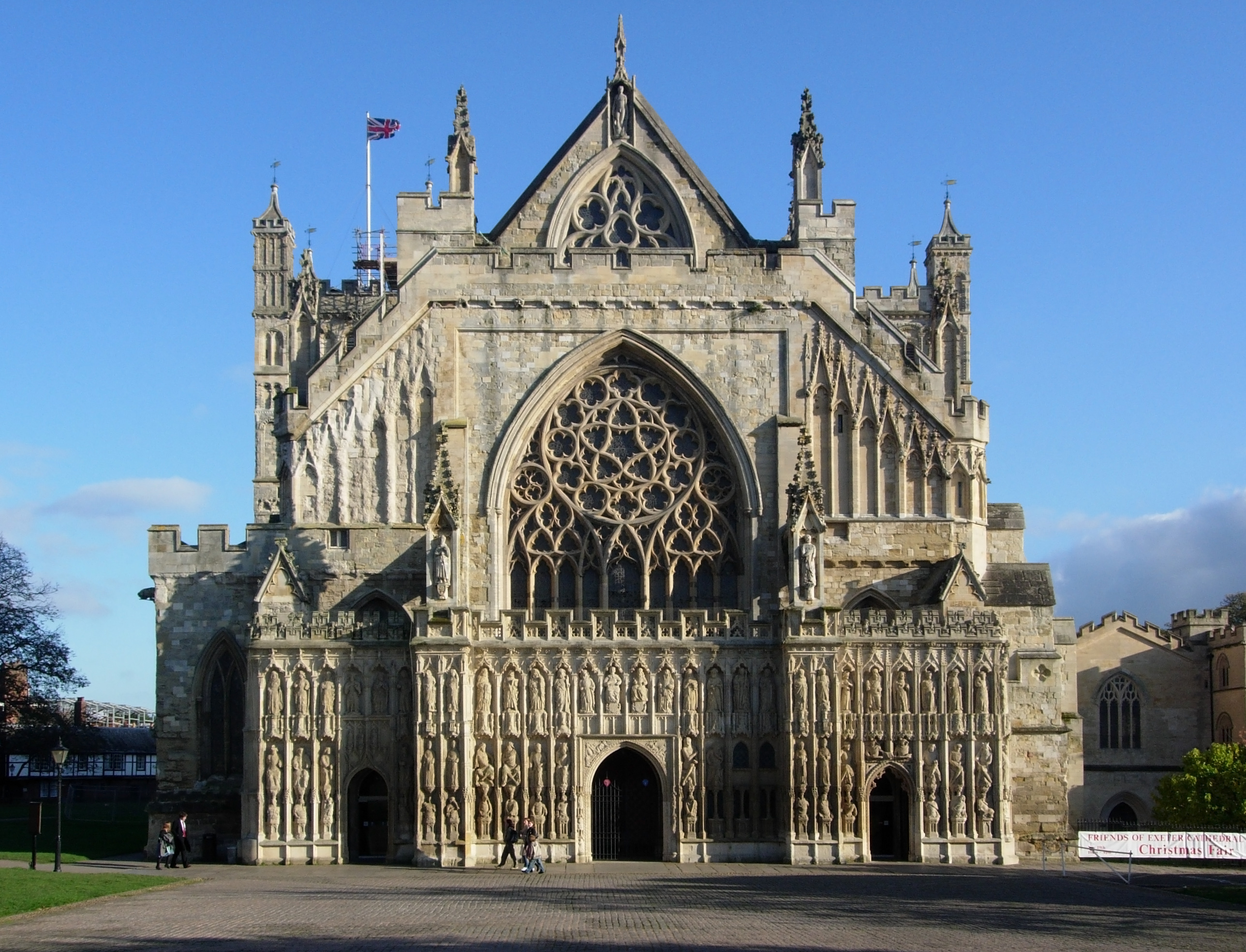
Exeter Cathedral has a screen with much original sculpture.

The West fronts of English cathedrals show a considerable diversity, rather than a consistent progression, as is the case in Northern France and other cathedrals influenced by the French Gothic style. In many cases, regardless of the architectural form, the English façade was treated as a decorative screen with many niches occupied by statues. A great number of these were toppled or defaced during the 17th century, however a "Gallery of Kings" remains high on the façade of Lincoln, and many of the original weather-worn figures remain at Exeter.

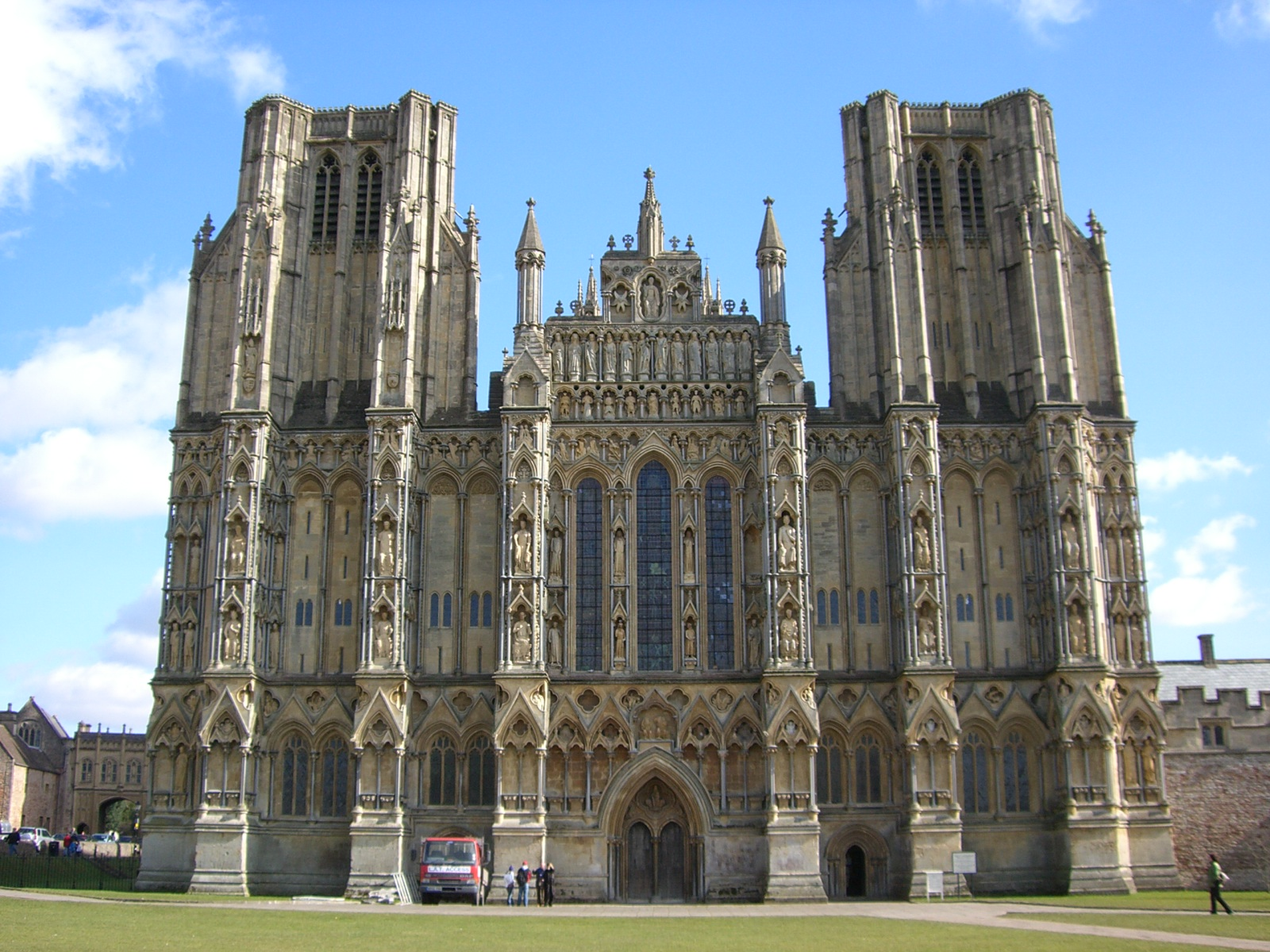
Wells Cathedral has towers, a sculpture gallery and lancet windows.

Most English cathedral facades fall into two basic types, with several variations. The most typical cathedrals are those that have large paired towers at their western end, as at Canterbury, Durham, Southwell, Wells, Ripon and York. These towers were mostly topped by wooden spires with a lead covering, but most of these were removed, many in the 18th century; only the medieval stone spires at Lichfield have survived intact. Between the towers is either a single large traceried window, as at York and Canterbury, or an arrangement of untraceried lancets, as at Ripon and Wells, rather than the rose windows typical of French facades. There are usually three doors but unlike those of French cathedrals, they are rarely highly elaborate and far more emphasis is placed on the central door than those to either side. The entrance in most common use in modern times is sometimes located in a porch at one side of the nave.

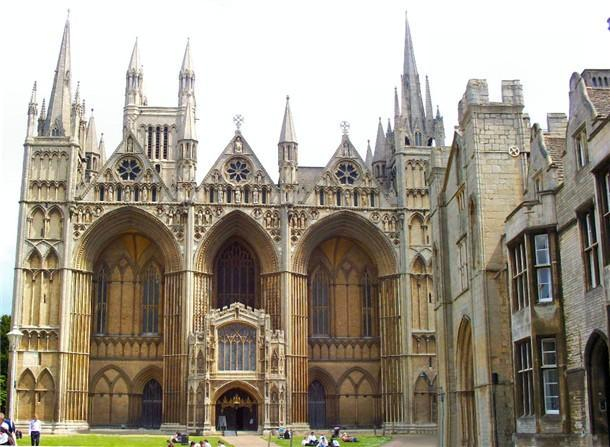
The Early English facade of Peterborough Cathedral is unique.

Where there are not two large towers at the west front, there are generally two pinnacled turrets that frame the façade or the central nave much in the nature of very large buttresses. This arrangement may be seen at Salisbury, Winchester and Rochester. At Lincoln a vast Gothic screen with similar buttress-like terminals was built across the front of the cathedral, incorporating the Norman portals, but hiding the Norman towers. The towers were then greatly heightened to be visible above the screen.

A Gothic screen was also added to the Norman nave at Peterborough, but this is an architectural oddity with no precedent or successor. The screen is composed of three enormous open arches, the two outer ones being much wider than that which frames the central door. The overwhelming composition is somewhat spoilt by the later porch and the fact that two towers of very different height pop up from behind the screen. Despite this, it is regarded as one of the supreme masterpieces of Gothic, revealing the enormous diversity and imagination of English medieval architects.

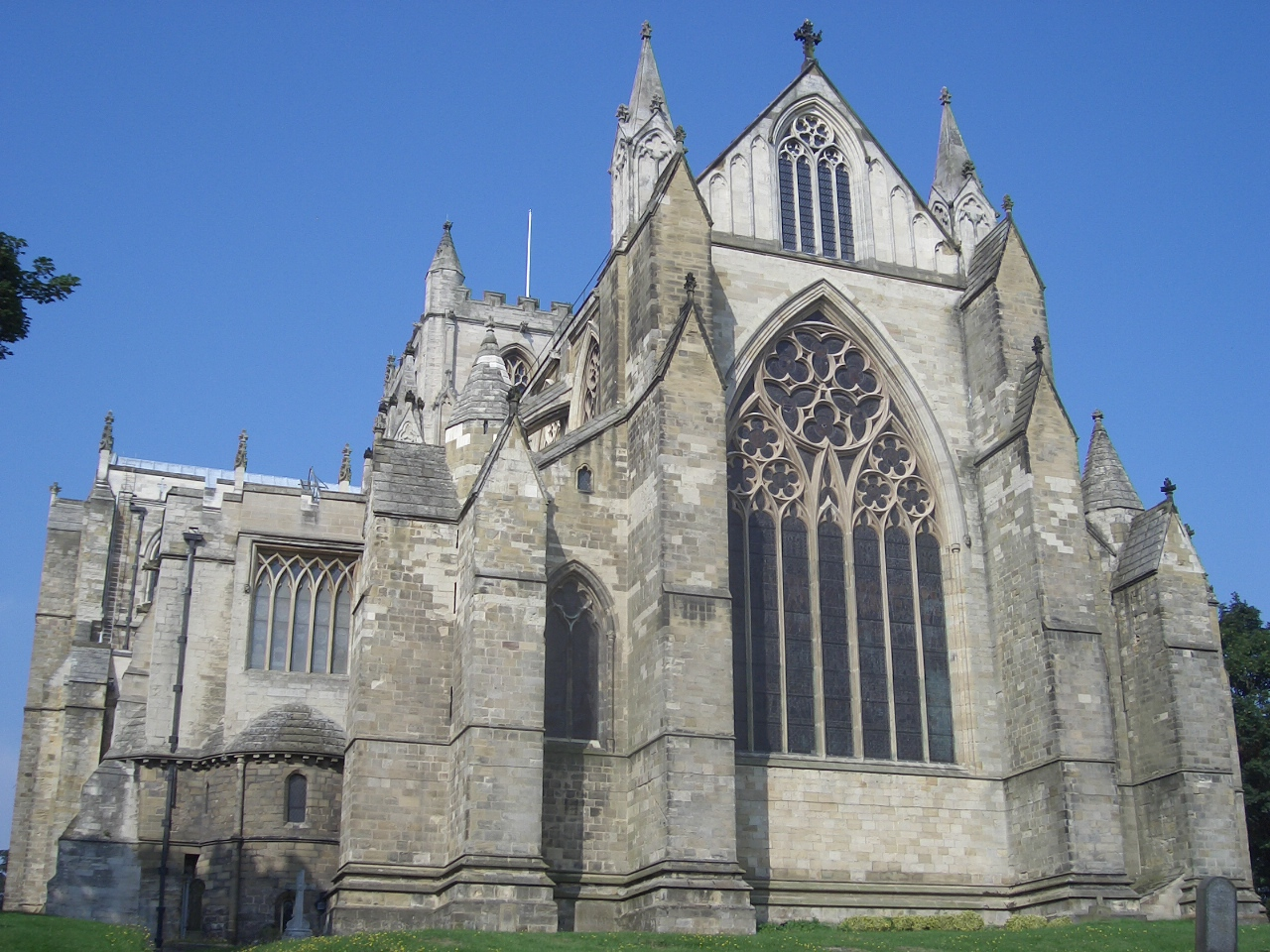
Ripon Cathedral has a "cliff-like" east end typical of English Gothic.

=== Eastern end ===
The eastern ends of English cathedrals show a greater diversity than those of any other country. Those built in the Norman era had high apsidal ends surrounded by a lower ambulatory, as is typical of Northern France. This arrangement still exists at Norwich and in part at Peterborough and also, with variation, in the Early English Gothic east end at Canterbury, but in every other case has been modified.

The typical arrangement for an English Gothic east end is square, and may be an unbroken cliff-like design as at York, Lincoln, Ripon, Ely and Carlisle or may have a projecting Lady Chapel of which there is a great diversity as at Salisbury, Lichfield, Hereford, Exeter and Chichester.

The ends of Norwich and Canterbury also have projecting chapels, that at Norwich being a Gothic addition to the Norman east end, while that at Canterbury, known as the Corona, being designed as part of the Early English plan, specifically to enshrine the relic of the crown of Thomas Becket's skull, sliced off at the time of his assassination. The east ends of a number of other cathedrals, such as Durham, Peterborough and Gloucester, have been modified in various ways and do not fit any particular model. If there is a polygonal chapter house, a distinctive English feature, it will be in this area.

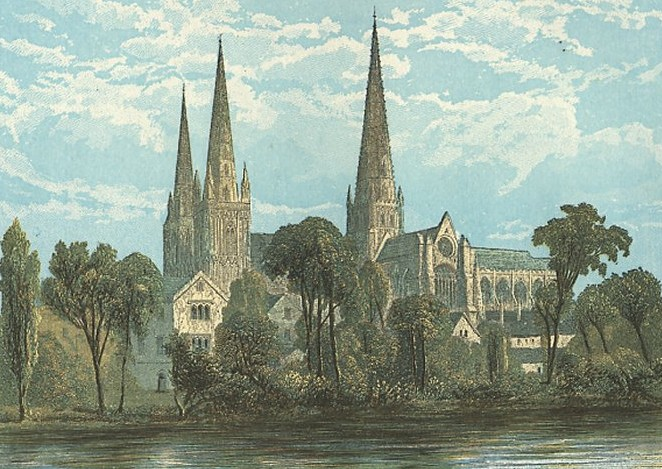
Lichfield Cathedral, postcard, 1888.

=== External appearance ===
As English cathedrals are often surrounded by an expanse of green lawn, the plan is usually clearly visible at ground level, which is not the case with the many European cathedrals that are closely surrounded by town or monastic buildings. The general impression is that the English cathedral sprawls across its site with many projecting limbs. These horizontal projections are visibly balanced by the strong verticals of the massive towers, which may be one, two or three in number. Many of the cathedrals, particularly those like Winchester, St. Albans and Peterborough where the towers are not particularly high, give an impression of tremendous length.

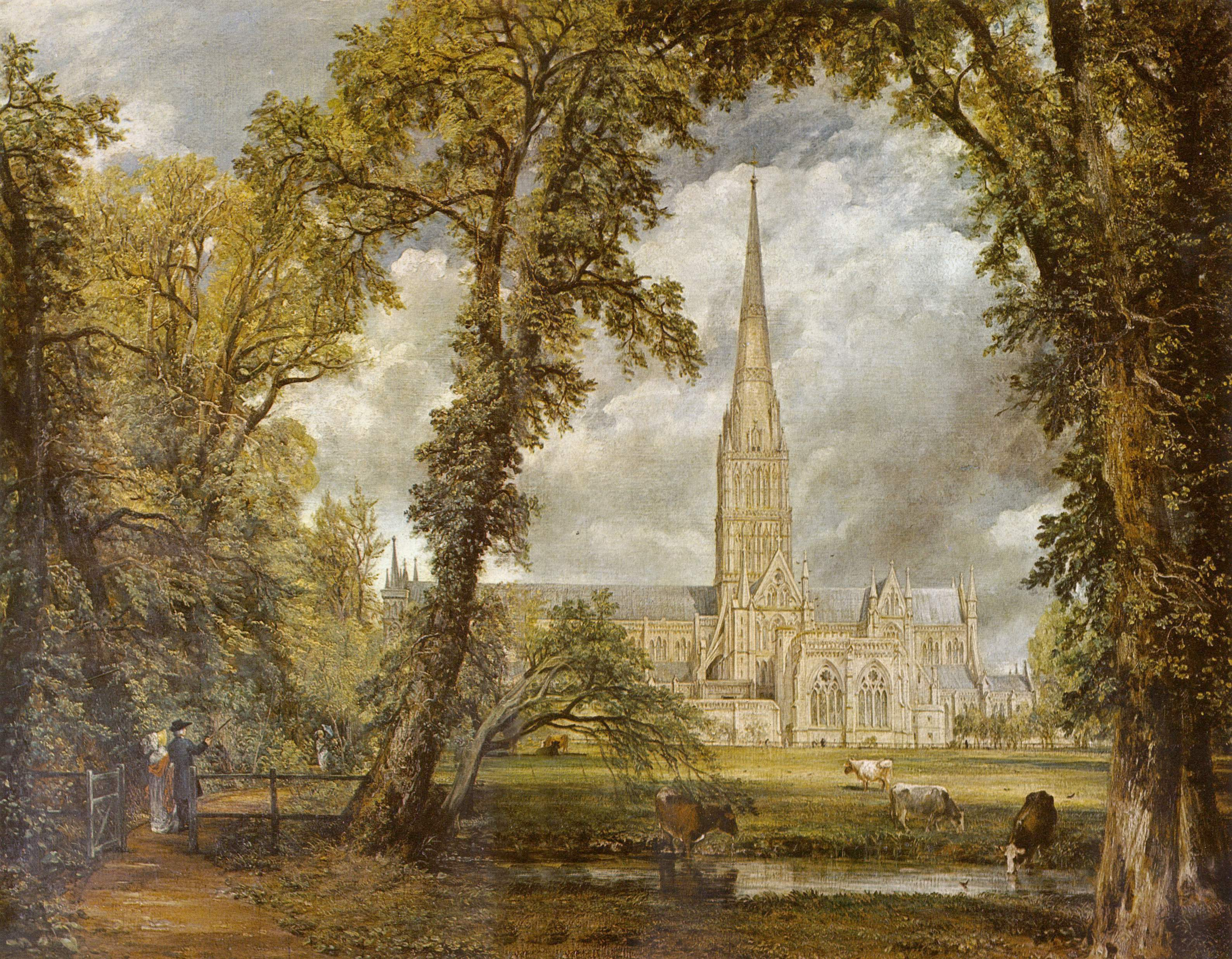
Salisbury Cathedral, oil painting, John Constable, 1820s.

While all the cathedrals are impressive, some, because of their location, are highly significant landmarks and landscape elements. Among these is Chichester, which can be seen for many miles across a landscape of open fields and is the only one of England's cathedrals that is visible from the sea. The grey spire of Norwich rises serenely from its surrounding city, to be a focus of the Norwich School of landscape painters. Ely, on a small hill, dominates the rural countryside and its appearance in times of flood causes it to be known as The Ship of the Fens. The three spires of Lichfield are known as The Ladies of the Vale. The "exquisite tower" of Worcester is seen best across the River Severn. Lincoln with its vast façade and three towers, the tallest being over 80 metres (270 ft), rises majestically from a steep hill above the town. Salisbury Cathedral with its "faultless spire" constitutes one of the iconic views of England, made famous by the landscape painter John Constable. In the north of England, Durham makes a "spectacular" view as it sits dramatically on its steep rocky peninsula above the River Wear, "half Church of God, half castle 'gainst the Scots".

=== Internal appearance ===
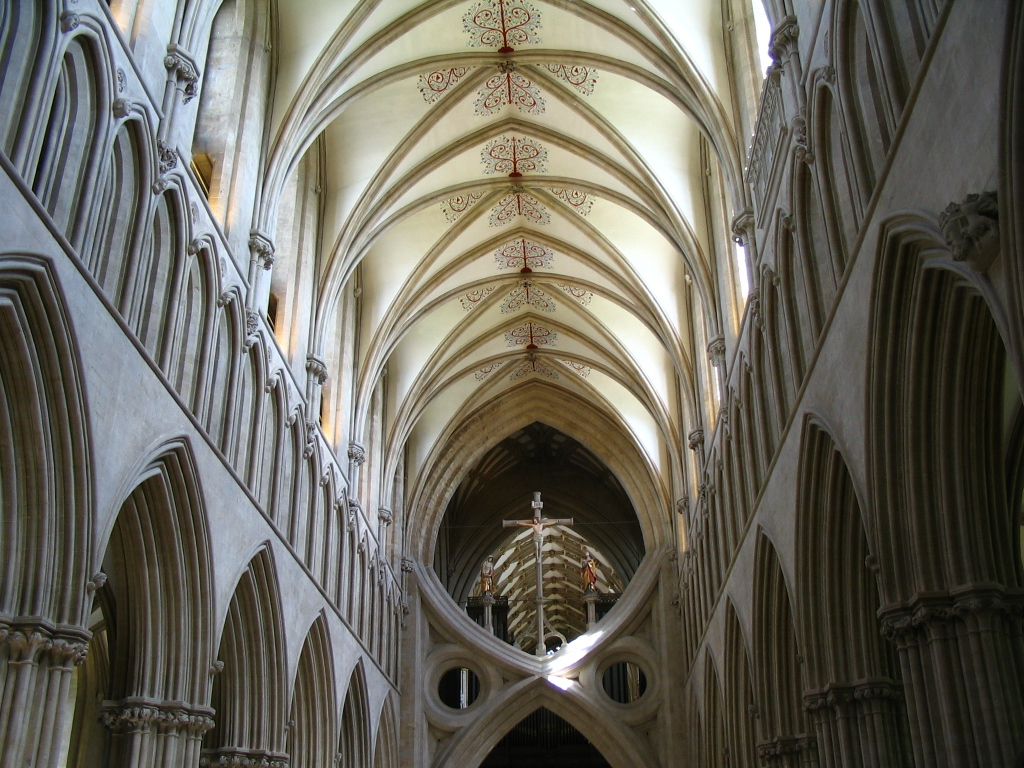
In Wells Cathedral the horizontal is emphasised, rather than the vertical.

==== Horizontal emphasis ====
Because the architecture of English cathedrals is so diverse and inventive, the internal appearances differ a great deal. However, in general, English cathedral interiors tend to give an impression of length. This is in part because many of the buildings are actually very long, but also because more than in the medieval architecture of any other country, the horizontal direction is given as much visual emphasis as the vertical. This is particularly the case at Wells where, unlike most Gothic buildings, there are no vertical shafts that continue from the arcade to the vault and there is a very strong emphasis on the triforium gallery with its seemingly endless and undifferentiated row of narrow arches. Salisbury has a similar lack of verticals while the course below the triforium and the undecorated capitals of Purbeck stone create strong visual horizontals. In the cases of Winchester, Norwich and Exeter the horizontal effect is created by the emphasis on the ridge rib of the elaborate vaults.

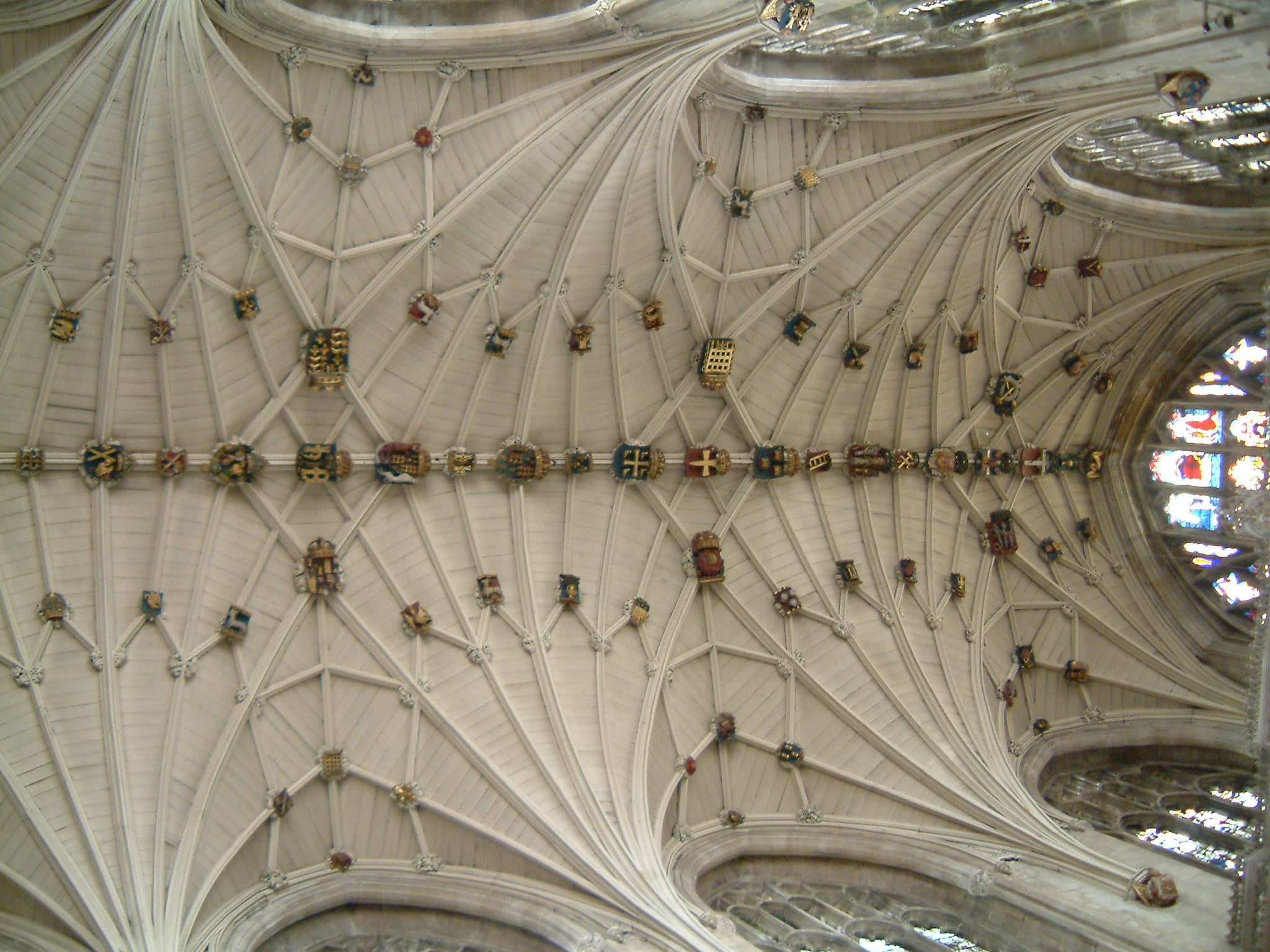
Lierne vault at Winchester

==== Complex vaulting ====
The complexity of the vault is another significant feature of English cathedrals. The vaults range from the simple quadripartite vault in the French manner at Chichester through increasingly elaborate forms including the multi-ribbed ("tierceron") vault at Exeter, the similar vault with inter-connecting ("lierne") ribs at Norwich, the still more elaborate variation at Winchester, the array of unique lierne vaults at Bristol, the net-like stellar vaulting of the choirs at Gloucester and York, the fan vaulting of the retro-choir at Peterborough, and the pendant vaulting of the choir at Oxford, where elaborate long stone bosses are suspended from the ceiling like lanterns. Many of the more elaborate forms are unique to England, with stellar vaulting also occurring in Spain and Germany.

== Architectural styles ==
=== Anglo-Saxon ===
While in most cases a Norman church entirely replaced an Anglo-Saxon one, at Ripon the cathedral retains its early Anglo-Saxon crypt of c. 670, the "only substantial" Anglo-Saxon element in an English cathedral; a similar crypt also survives below the former cathedral of Hexham Abbey. At Winchester the excavated foundations of the 10th-century cathedral – when built, the largest church in northern Europe – are marked on grass of the cathedral close. At Worcester, a new cathedral was built in the Norman style from 1084, but the crypt contains re-used stonework and columns from its two Anglo-Saxon predecessor churches. Elsewhere, the abbey church of Sherborne Abbey preserves much masonry from the former Anglo-Saxon cathedral, in the west front, transepts and crossing, so that the nave and crossing of the present late medieval abbey retains the proportions of the previous Anglo-Saxon structure.

=== Norman ===
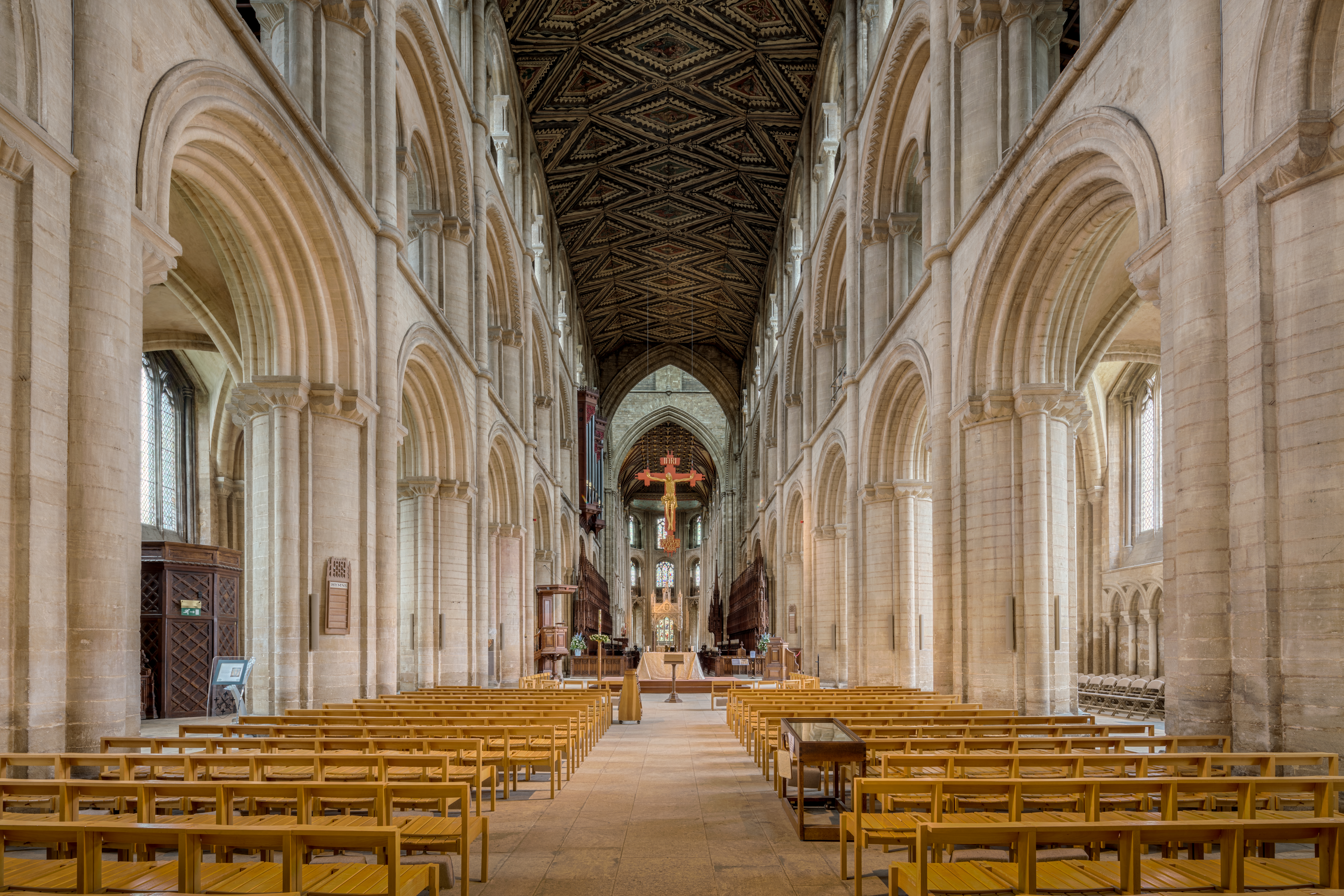
The Norman interior of Peterborough Cathedral.

The comprehensive reconstruction of the Anglo-Saxon cathedral churches of England by the Normans represented the single largest ecclesiastical building programme of medieval Europe and when built, these were the biggest structures to have been erected in Christian Europe since the end of the Roman Empire. These were part of the general European style of Romanesque architecture, but examples in England are still mostly referred to by the traditional term of "Norman". All the medieval cathedrals of England, with the exception of Salisbury, Lichfield and Wells have evidence of Norman architecture. Peterborough, Durham and Norwich remain for the greater part Norman buildings, while at many others there are substantial parts of the building in the Norman style, such as the naves of Ely, Gloucester and Southwell, and the transepts at Winchester. The Norman architecture is distinguished by its round-headed arches, and bold tiers of arcades on piers, which originally supported flat wooden roofs of which two survive, at Peterborough and Ely. Columns, where used, are massive, as in the nave at Gloucester, and are alternated with piers at Durham. Mouldings were cut with geometric designs and arcading was a major decorative form, particularly externally. Little figurative sculpture has survived, notably the "barbaric" ornament around the west doors at Lincoln, the bestial capitals of the crypt at Canterbury and the tympanum of the west door at Rochester.

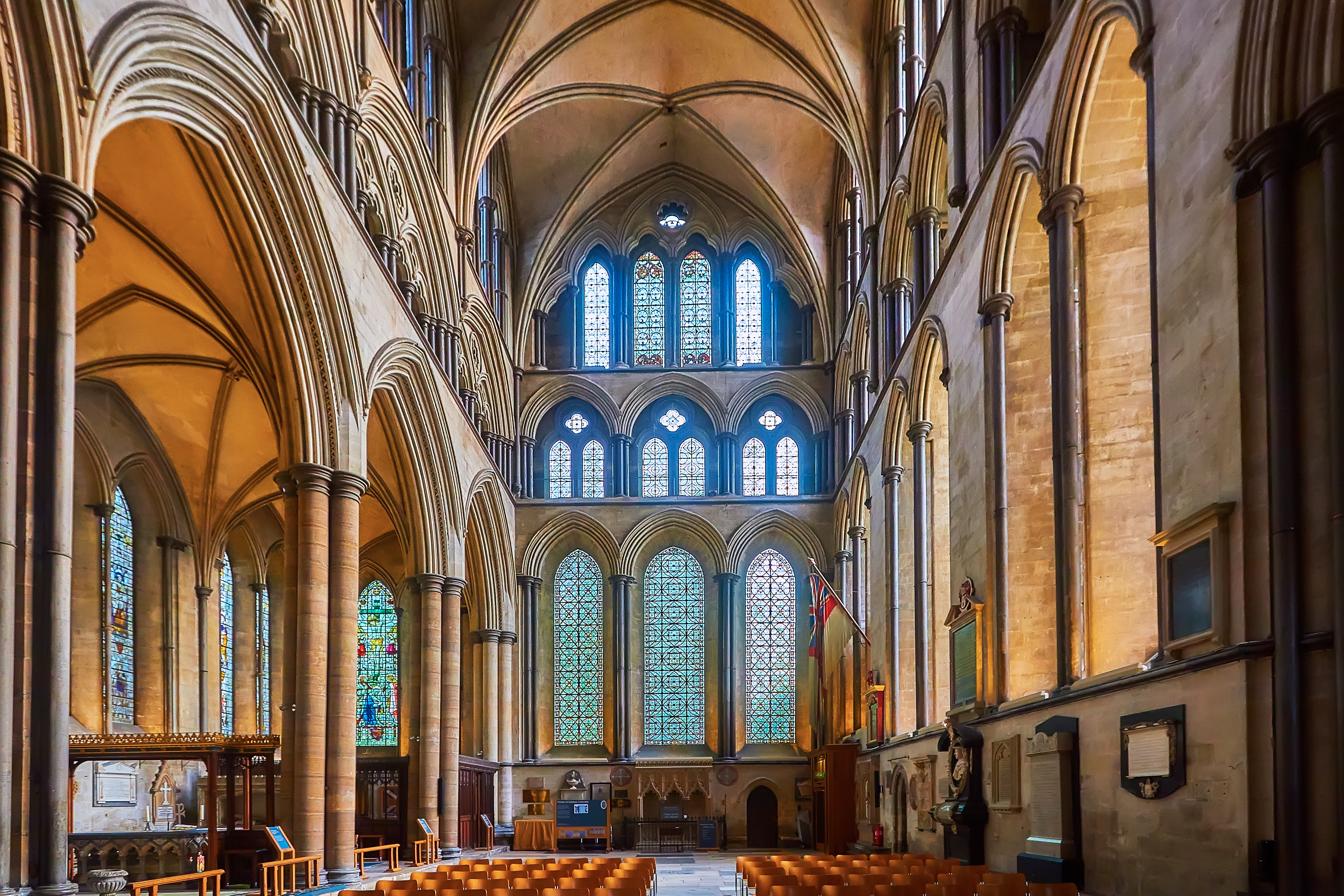
Lancet Gothic at Salisbury Cathedral.

=== Lancet Gothic ===
Many of the cathedrals have major parts in the late-12th-to-early-13th-century style known as Lancet Gothic or Early English Gothic, and defined by its simple, untraceried lancet-like openings. Salisbury Cathedral is the major example of this style, which is also seen at Wells and Worcester, at the eastern arms of Canterbury, Hereford and Southwark, and the transepts of York. Also of this period is the spectacular façade of Peterborough, and the less grand but harmonious façade of Ripon.

=== Decorated Gothic ===
The Decorated Gothic style, with traceried windows, is further subdivided dependent upon whether the tracery is Geometric or Curvilinear. Many cathedrals have important parts in the Geometric style of the mid 13th to early 14th centuries, including much of Lincoln, Lichfield, the choir of Ely, and the chapter houses of Salisbury and Southwell. By the late 13th century the style of tracery evolved to include a greater number of narrow shapes that adapted easily to Gothic openings in combination with circular shapes as can be seen in the windows of the chapter house of York, the Octagon of Ely and the west window of Exeter.

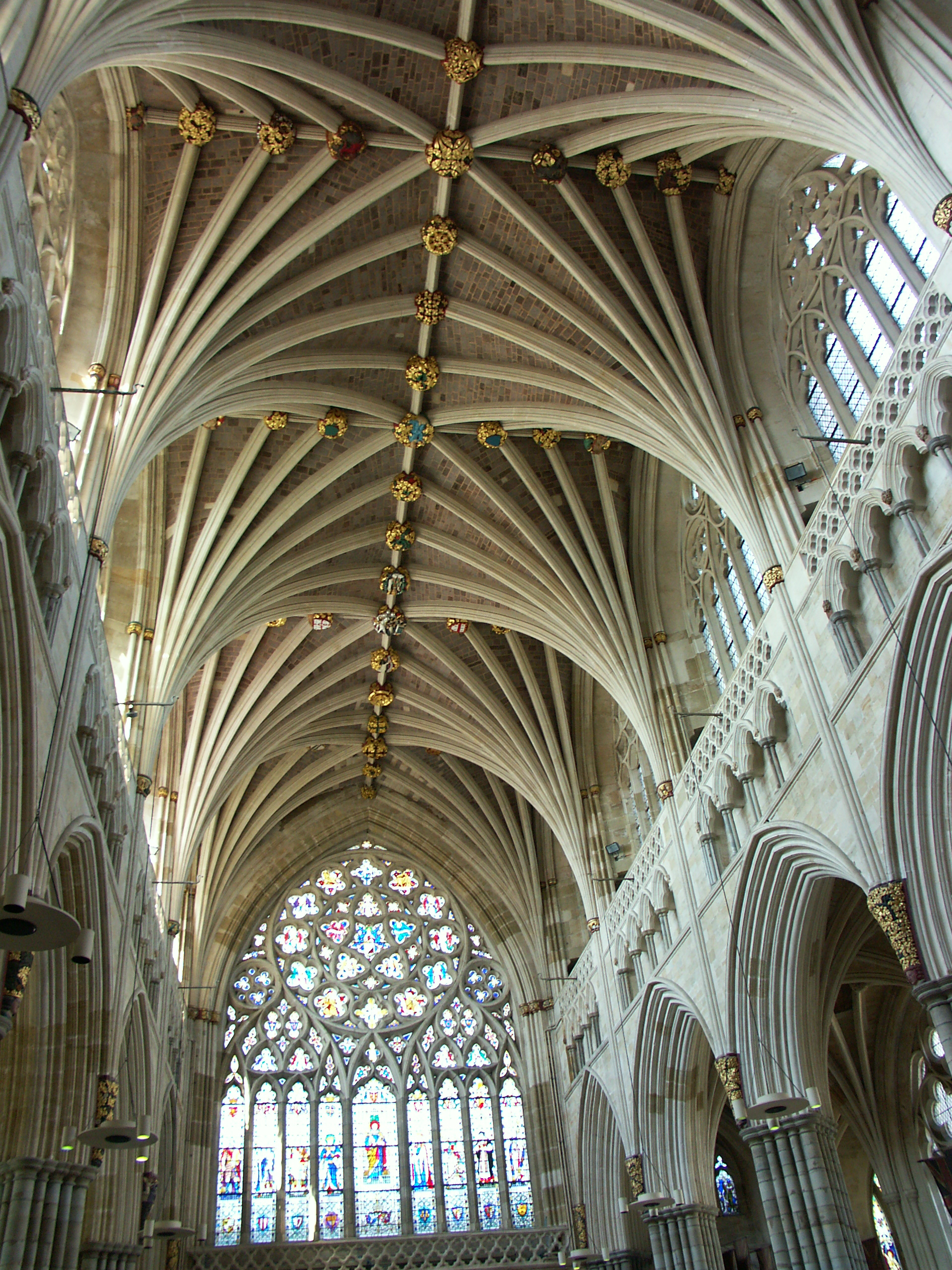
Decorated Gothic at Exeter Cathedral.

Further development included the repetition of Curvilinear or flame-like forms that occur in a great number of windows of around 1320, notably in the retro-choir at Wells and the nave of Exeter Cathedral. This type of tracery is often seen in combination with vaulting ribs of extreme projection and very rich moulding, as is seen in the chapter house at Wells, and the vault at Exeter, which stretches, uninterrupted by a central tower, for 91 metres (300 ft) and is the longest medieval vault in the world.

The last stage of Curvilinear or Flowing Decorated Gothic, is expressed in tracery of very varied and highly complex forms. Many of the largest and most famous windows of England date from 1320 to 1330 and are in this style. They include the south transept rose window known as the "Bishop's Eye" at Lincoln, the "Heart of Yorkshire" window in the west end of York and the famous nine-light east window of Carlisle.

There are many smaller architectural works within cathedrals which have the curvilinear tracery. These include the arcading in the Lady Chapel at Ely, which also has the widest vault in England, the pulpitum screen at Lincoln and richly decorated doorways at Ely and Rochester. Characteristic of this period of Gothic is elaborate lierne vaulting in which the main ribs are connected by intermediate ribs which do not spring from the wall and so are not major structural members. The vaults of Bristol are the most famous examples of this style, which can also be seen at York.

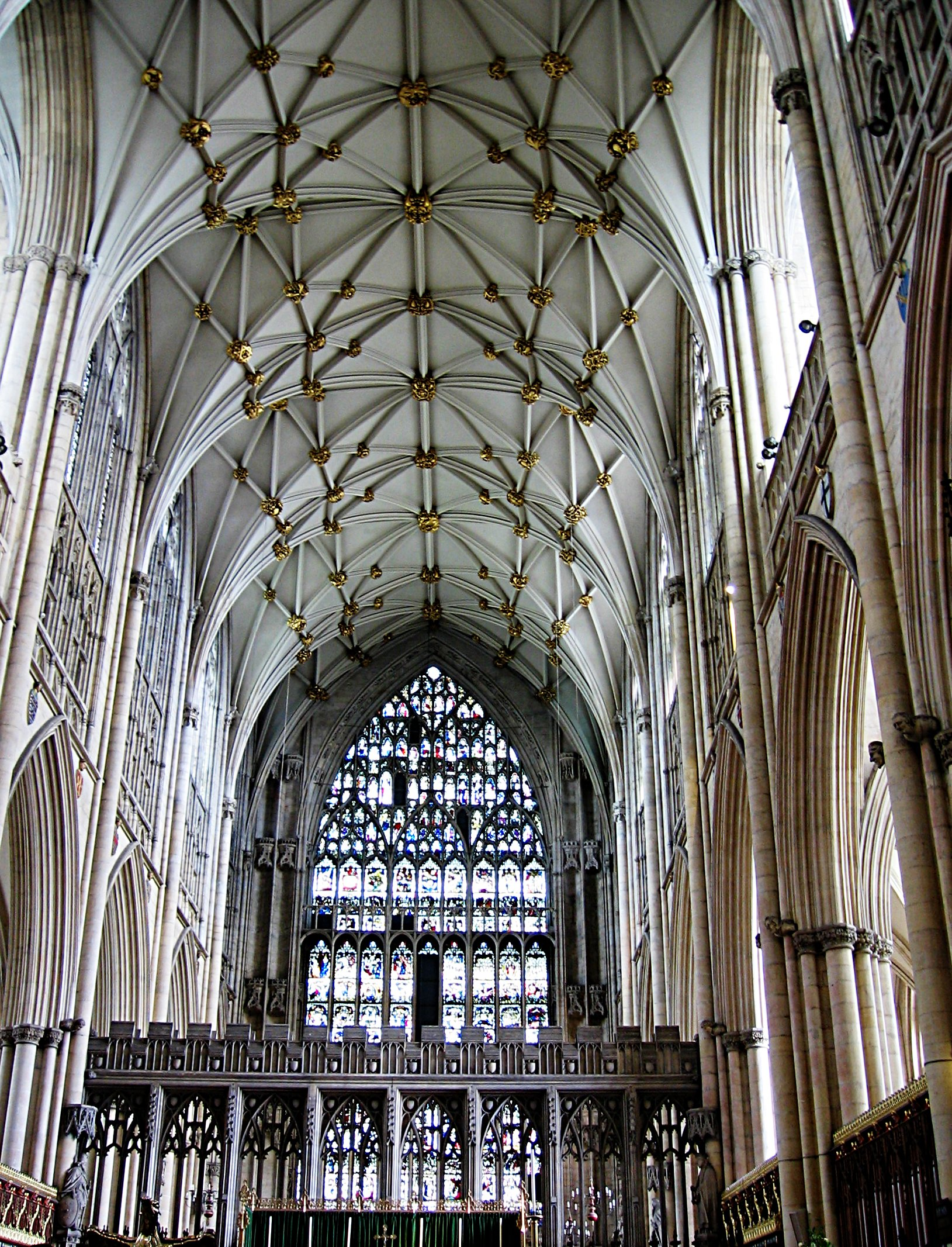
The Perpendicular choir of York Minster.

=== Perpendicular Gothic ===
In the 1330s, when the architects of Europe were embracing the Flamboyant style, English architecture moved away from the Flowing Decorated in an entirely different and much more sober direction with the reconstruction, in highly modular form, of the choir of the Norman abbey, now cathedral, at Gloucester. The Perpendicular style, which relies on a network of intersecting mullions and transoms rather than on a diversity of richly carved forms for effect, gives an overall impression of great unity, in which the structure of the vast windows of both clerestory and east end are integrated with the arcades below and the vault above. The style proved very adaptable and continued with variations in the naves of Canterbury and Winchester, and in the choir of York.

During the 15th century, many of England's finest towers were either built or extended in the Perpendicular style including those of the cathedrals of Gloucester, Worcester, Wells, York, Durham and Canterbury, and the spires of Chichester and Norwich.

The design of church interiors went through a final stage that lasted into the 16th century. This was the development of fan vaulting, first used in about 1370 in the cloisters at Gloucester, then in the retrochoir at Peterborough in the early 15th century. In a still more elaborate form with stone pendants it was used to roof the great funerary chapel of Henry VII at Westminster Abbey, at a time when Italy had embraced the Renaissance.

== Architectural diversity ==
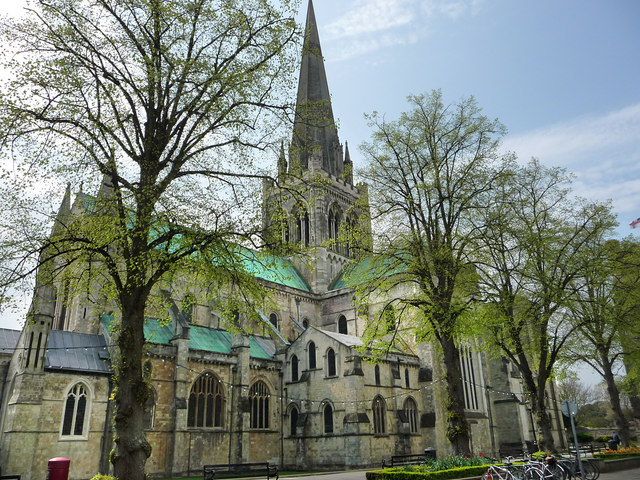
This view of Chichester Cathedral shows four distinct architectural styles.

The plan of Salisbury Cathedral is that most often reproduced in architectural histories for the purpose of comparing English Gothic architecture with that of France, Italy and other countries. It has many features that, on paper at least, are typical. The plan of Worcester Cathedral, for example, closely resembles that of Salisbury. Both have two transepts, a large central tower, a large porch to the north side of the nave, a cloister to the south, off which opens a polygonal chapter house. Internally, there are also strong visual similarities in the simple lancet windows of the east end and the contrasting profusion of Purbeck marble shafts. But the histories of the two buildings are very different. Salisbury Cathedral took 160 years to complete, from its foundations in 1220 to the top of its massive spire in 1380. Worcester took 420 years from its Norman crypt of 1084 to its chapel in memory of Prince Arthur in 1504. The history of Worcester is much more representative of the history of most of England's medieval cathedrals than is that of Salisbury.

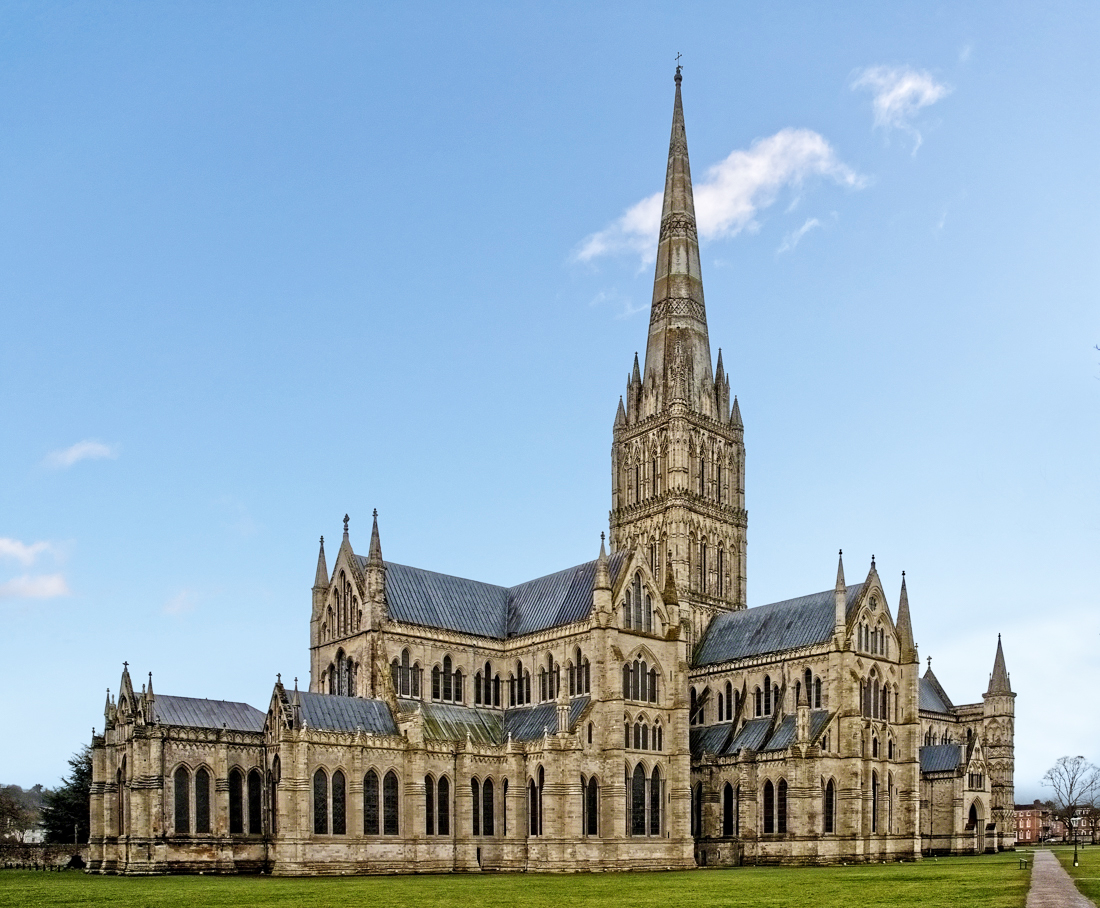
Salisbury Cathedral, 1220–1380.

=== The building of Salisbury Cathedral ===
An earlier cathedral was located, between 1075 and 1228, on the hill top near the ancient fort at Old Sarum. In the early 13th century it was decided to move the location of the cathedral to the plain. The new building was designed in the Lancet Gothic style (otherwise known as Early English Gothic) by Elias of Dereham and Nicholas of Ely and begun in 1220, starting at the eastern end, and rising westward until by 1258 it was complete, except for the façade and central tower. The façade, huge cloister and polygonal chapter house were then constructed by Richard Mason and were completed by about 1280, the later work employing Geometric Decorated tracery in the openings of windows and arcades. It was about fifty years before the major undertaking of the tower and spire was commenced, the architect being Richard Farleigh and the details being rather more intricate and elaborate than the earlier work. The entire cathedral was complete by 1380, and the only subsequent inclusion of note has been the reinforcement of the arches of the tower when one of the piers developed a bend. This three-part building programme spanning 160 years with a fifty-year gap in the middle is the shortest and least diverse and makes Salisbury by far the most homogenous of all the cathedrals.

=== The building of Worcester Cathedral ===
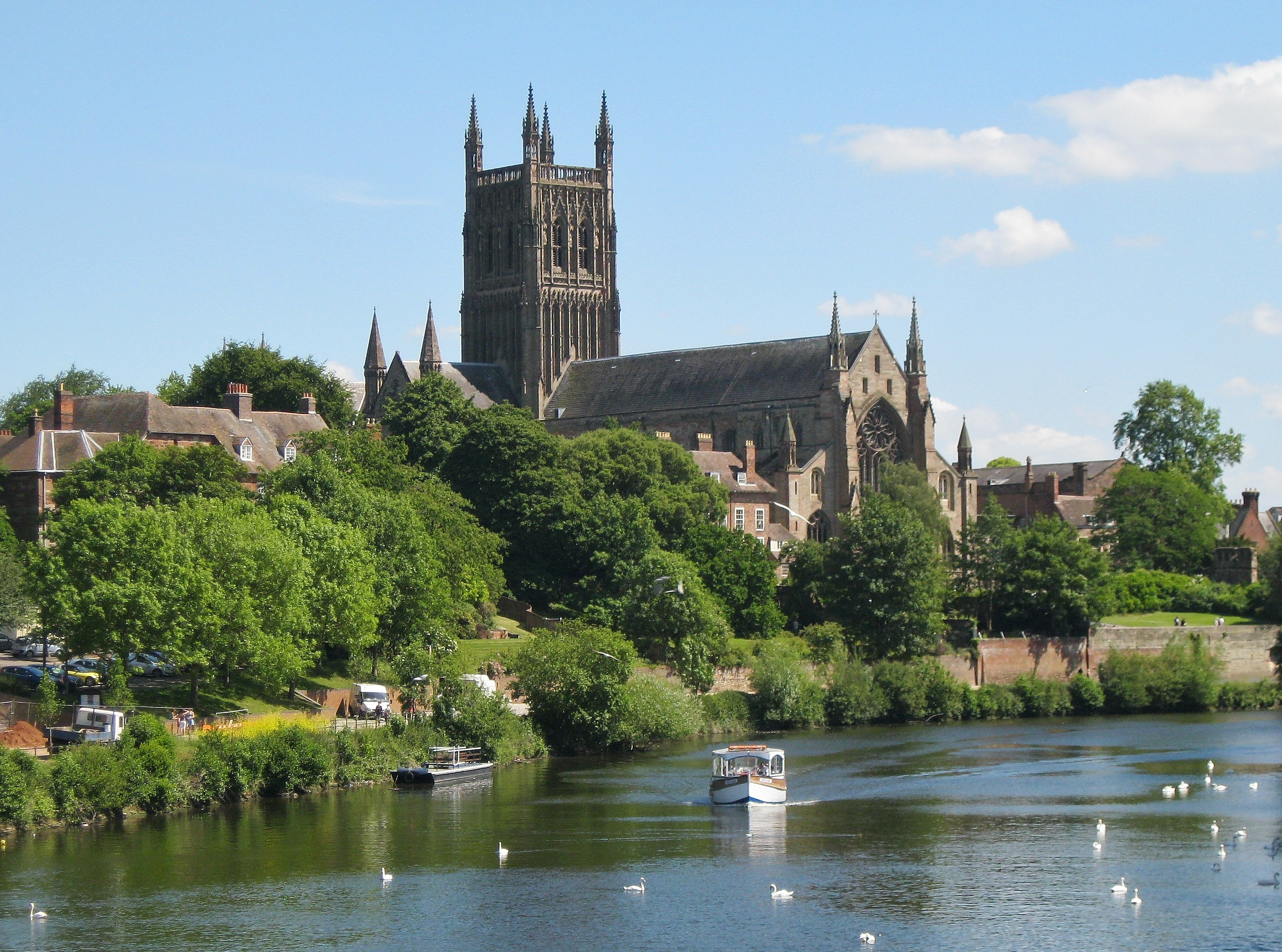
Worcester Cathedral, 1084–1504.

Worcester Cathedral, unlike Salisbury, has important parts of the building dating from every century from the 11th to the 16th. The earliest part of the building at Worcester is the multi-columned Norman crypt with cushion capitals remaining from the original monastic church begun by St Wulfstan in 1084. Also from the Norman period is the circular chapter house of 1120, made octagonal on the outside when the walls were reinforced in the 14th century. The nave was built and rebuilt piecemeal and in different styles by several different architects over a period of 200 years, some bays being a unique and decorative transition between Norman and Gothic. It dates from 1170 to 1374. The east end was rebuilt over the Norman crypt by Alexander Mason between 1224 and 1269, coinciding with, and in a very similar Early English style to the greater part of Salisbury. From 1360 John Clyve finished off the nave, built its vault, the west front, the north porch and the eastern range of the cloister. He also strengthened the Norman chapter house, added buttresses and changed its vault. His masterpiece is the central tower of 1374, originally supporting a timber, lead-covered spire, now gone. Between 1404 and 1432 an unknown architect added the north and south ranges to the cloister, which was eventually closed by the western range by John Chapman, 1435–38. The last important addition is the Prince Arthur's Chantry Chapel to the right of the south choir aisle, 1502–04.

== Famous features of the cathedrals ==
=== Bristol Cathedral ===
Begun in 1140 (Note: All the dates are those given by Harvey, 1961) and completed in 1888, Bristol Cathedral's fame lies in the unique 14th-century lierne vaults of the choir and choir aisles, which are of three different designs and, according to Nikolaus Pevsner, "...from a point of view of spatial imagination are superior to anything else in England."

=== Canterbury Cathedral ===
Founded as a cathedral in 597, the earliest parts are from 1070, completed 1505, except the north west tower of 1834. Canterbury is one of the biggest cathedrals in England, and seat of the Archbishop of Canterbury. It is famous for the Norman crypt with sculptured capitals, the east end of 1175–84 by William of Sens, the 12th- and 13th-century stained glass, the "supremely beautiful" Perpendicular nave of 1379–1405 by Henry Yevele, the fan vault of the tower of 1505 by John Wastell, the tomb of the Black Prince and the site of the murder of St. Thomas Becket.

=== Carlisle Cathedral ===
Founded in 1092 and completed in the early 15th century, Carlisle Cathedral is one of England's smallest cathedrals since the demolition of its nave by the Scottish Presbyterian Army in 1649. Its most significant feature is its nine-light Flowing Decorated east window of 1322, still containing medieval glass in its upper sections, forming a "glorious termination to the choir" and regarded by many as having the finest tracery in England.

=== Chester Cathedral ===
Built between 1093 and 1537, Chester Cathedral includes a set of medieval choir stalls dating from 1380, with exquisite figurative carving. An unusual feature is the very large south transept. The Early English Lady Chapel is a harmonious composition in Lancet Gothic. It retains substantial monastic buildings including a large refectory.

=== Chichester Cathedral ===
Built between 1088 and the early 15th century, the unusual features of Chichester Cathedral are a Transitional retro choir, a pair of early Norman relief carvings and its freestanding belfry of the 15th century. The spire, rebuilt after its collapse in 1860, can be seen from the English Channel.

Features

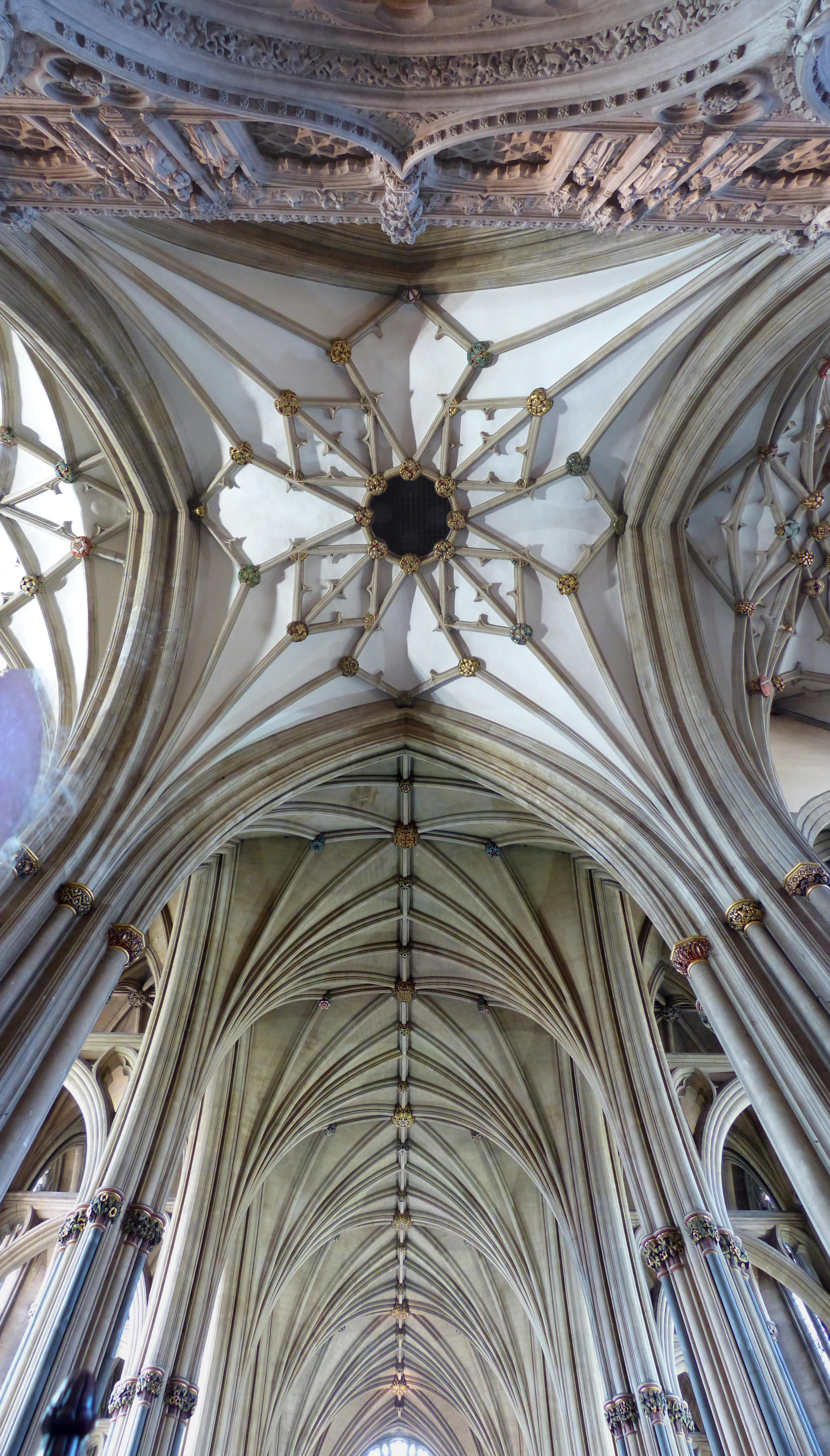
The lierne vault of the crossing at Bristol Cathedral.

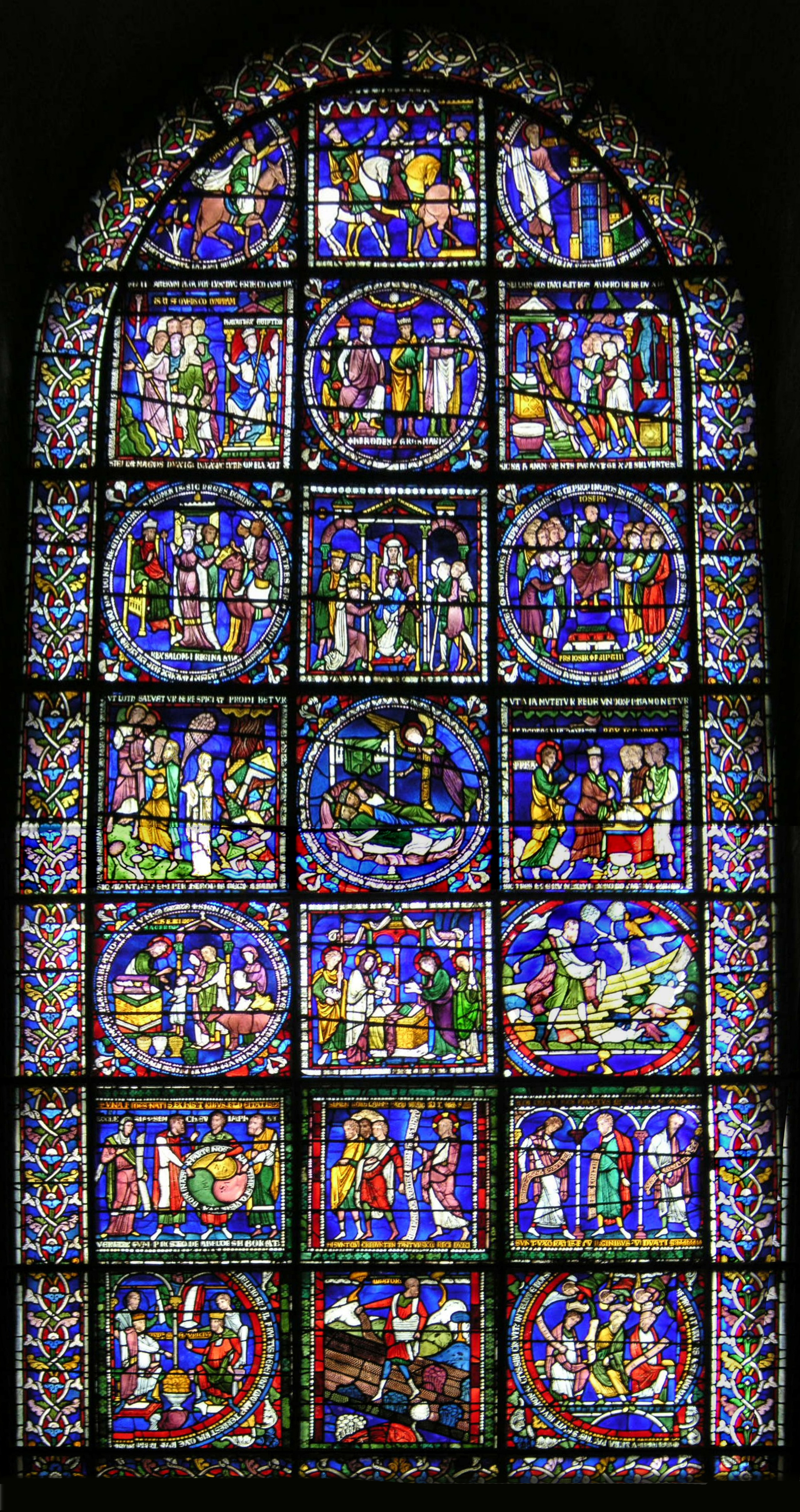
Canterbury Cathedral, The Poor Man's Bible window.

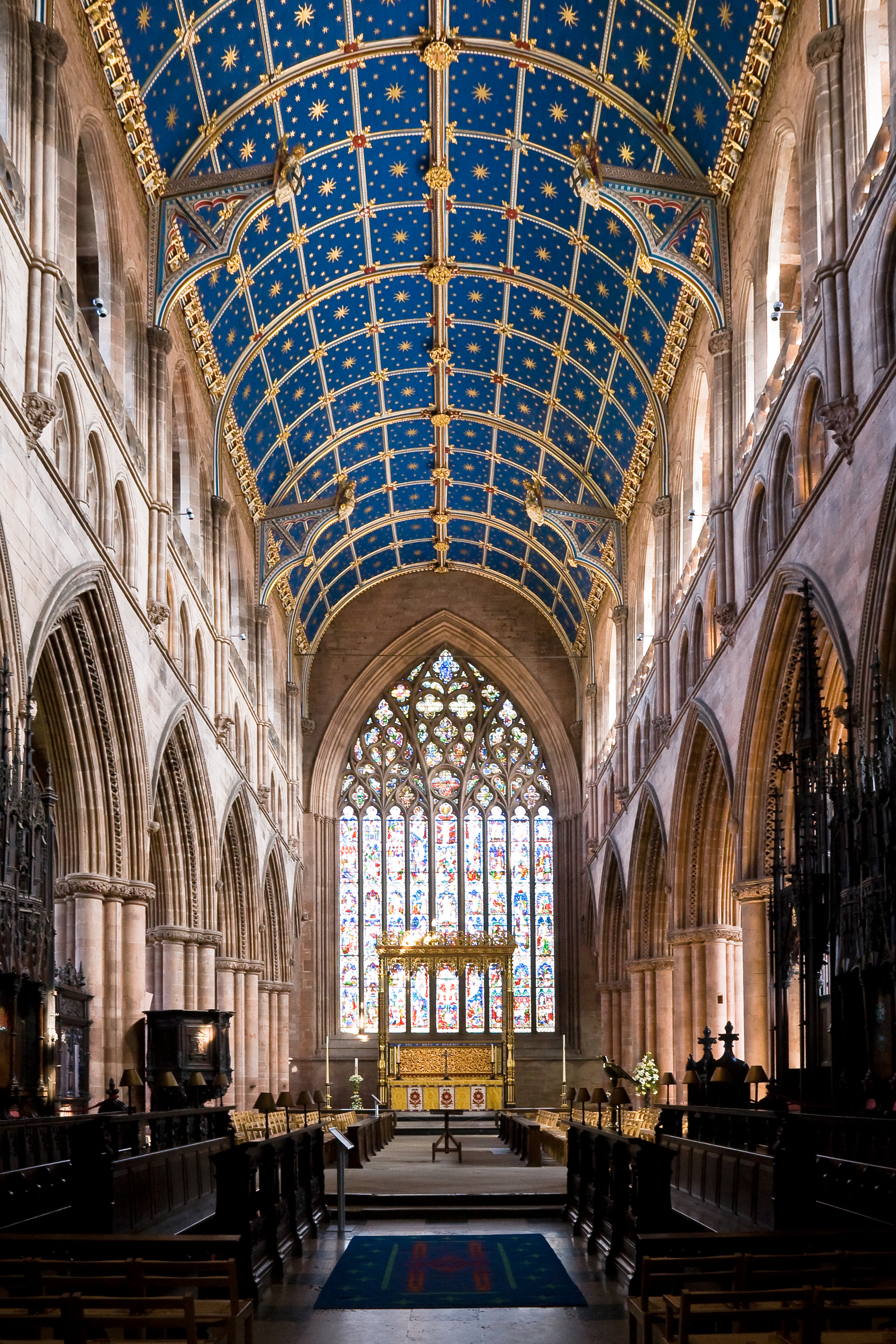
Carlisle Cathedral, the flowing Decorated Gothic tracery window of the chancel.

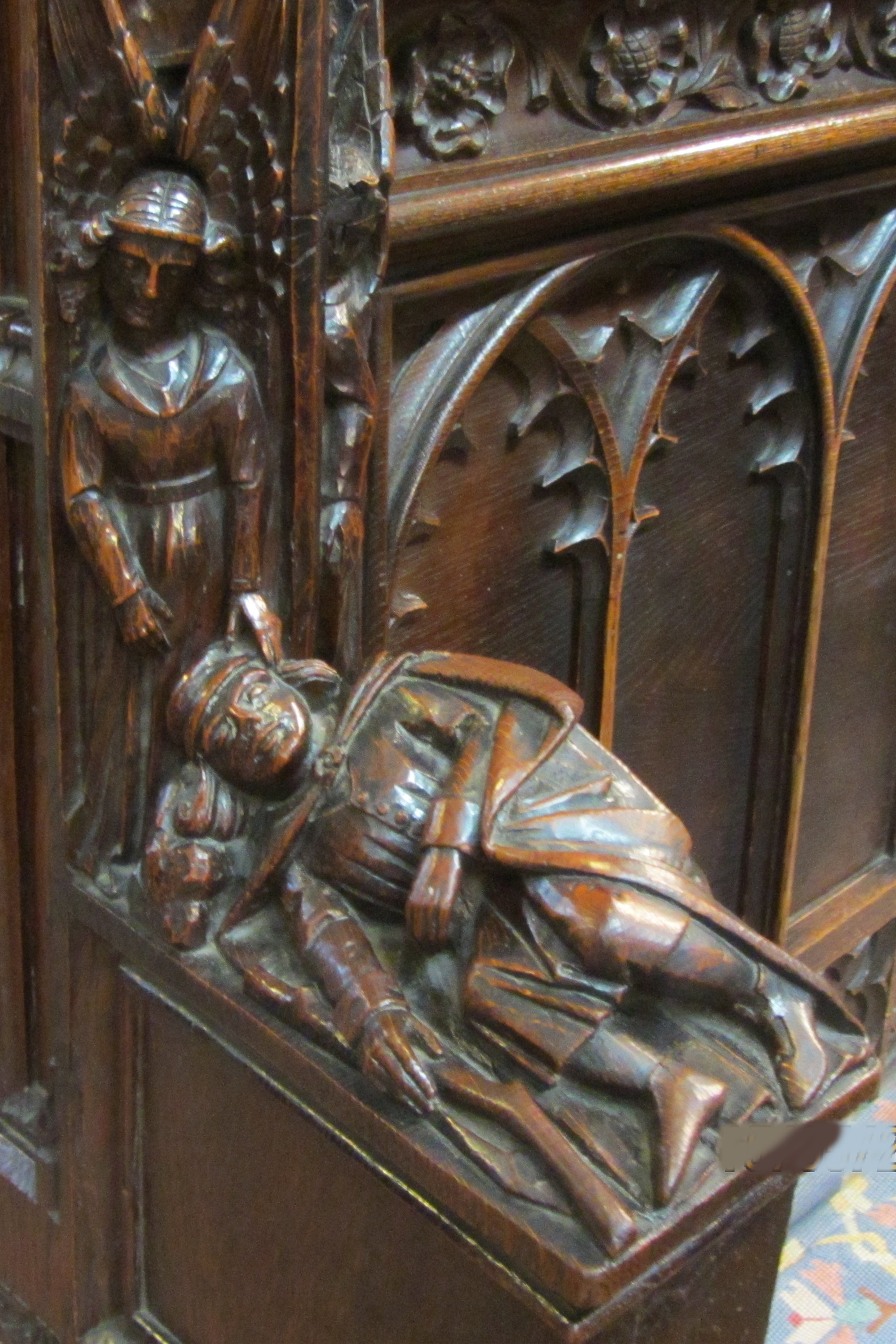
Chester Cathedral, Detail of the Mediaeval choir stalls

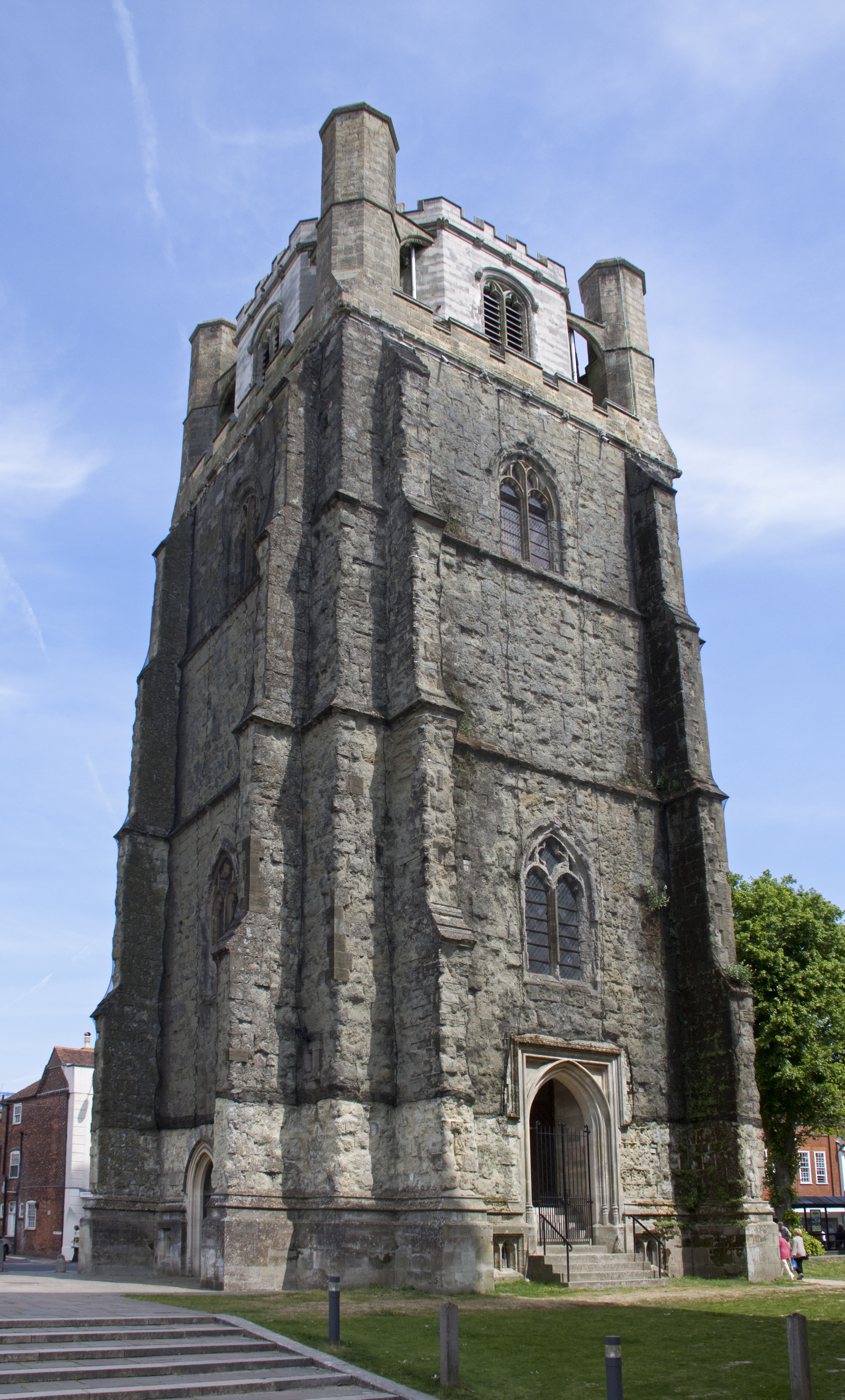
Chichester Cathedral, The freestanding bell tower

=== Durham Cathedral ===
Built between 1093 and 1490, Durham Cathedral, with the exception of the upper parts of its towers, the eastern extension known as the Chapel of Nine Altars, and the large west window of 1341, is entirely Norman and is regarded by Alec Clifton-Taylor as "the incomparable masterpiece of Romanesque architecture". The interior is "overwhelmingly impressive". The western Lady Chapel known as the Galilee Chapel is a unique Norman building different in style to the cathedral itself. The view of the cathedral from the south west is particularly famous because of its "incomparable setting" on a steep promontory above the River Wear. The Venerable C.J. Stranks wrote "It stands today vast and impressive in its massive strength, and yet so well proportioned that there is nothing about it which seems ponderous."

=== Ely Cathedral ===
With the present building dating between 1090 and 1536, Ely Cathedral has a significant Norman nave and Decorated Gothic choir, but its most important features are its unique western tower of 1174 and central octagon of 1322, which Clifton-Taylor describes as "one of the wonders of English cathedral architecture". It also has a unique, very large, free-standing Lady Chapel with a very wide vault and intricately carved stone arcades around the sedilia.

=== Exeter Cathedral ===
Dating from 1112 to 1519, Exeter Cathedral is the major example of a cathedral built mainly in the later Decorated Gothic style of the 14th century. It has an impressive vault, the longest medieval vault in the world, which runs between two Norman towers placed, uniquely among the cathedrals, over the transepts. (Note: The towers also occupied this position at Old Sarum and Ottery St Mary.) Exeter has many sculptural details, including the figures of its west front.

=== Gloucester Cathedral ===
Dating from 1098 to 1493, Gloucester Cathedral has a Norman nave with massive masonry piers, and a fine 15th-century Perpendicular tower, but its main feature is the eastern end, reconstructed in the 14th century as an early example of Perpendicular Gothic and with the largest medieval window in the world, the area of a tennis court. The cloisters have the earliest example of fan-vaulting.

=== Hereford Cathedral ===
Built between 1079 and 1530, with a 19th-century west front, Hereford Cathedral has a Norman nave and large central tower. Other important features being the unusual style of the north transept and the north porch, also of the 13th century, but greatly extended in the 16th. Its Early English Lady Chapel is considered "one of the most beautiful of the thirteenth century".

Features

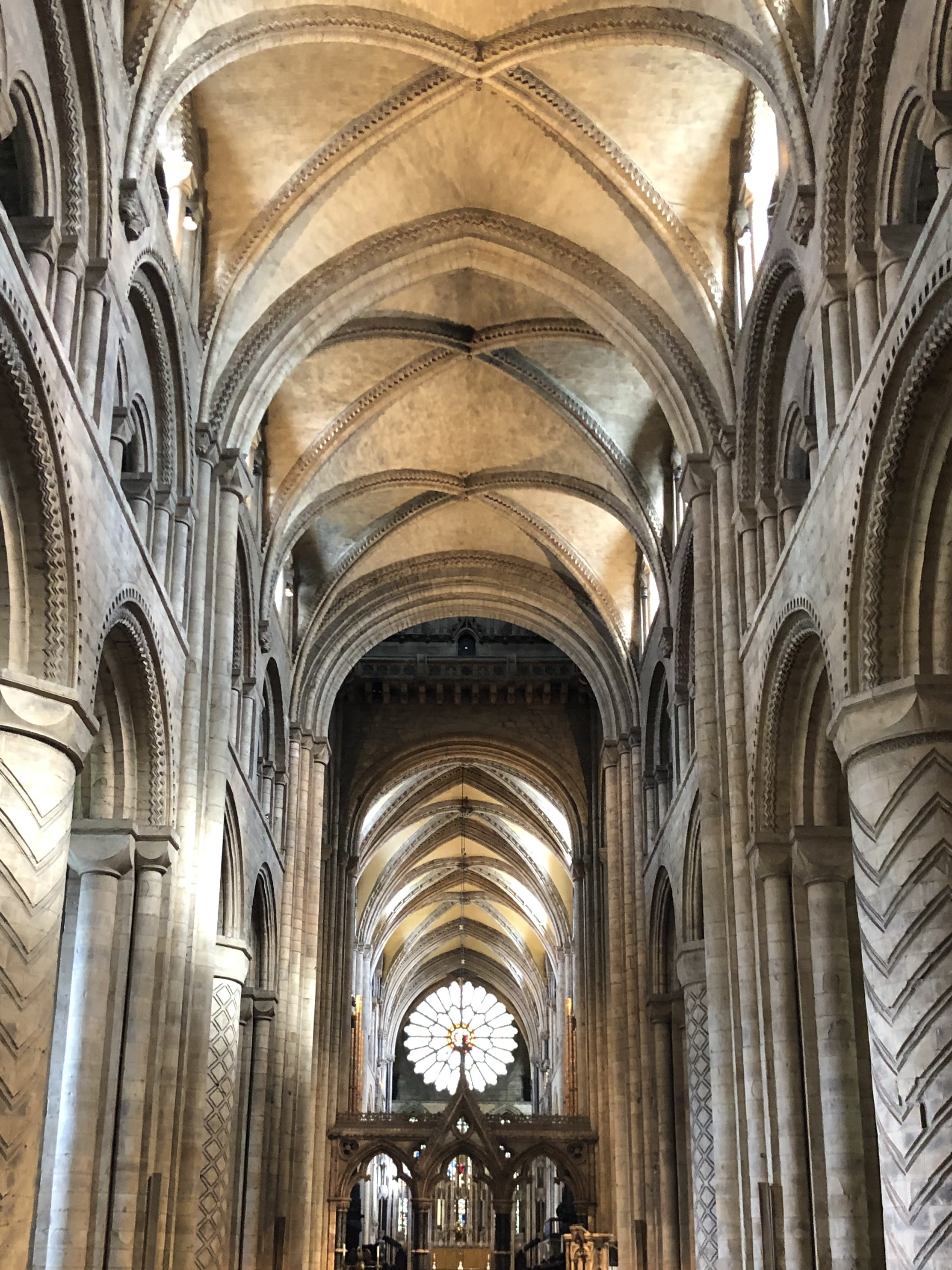
The Norman interior and early ribbed and pointed vault at Durham Cathedral

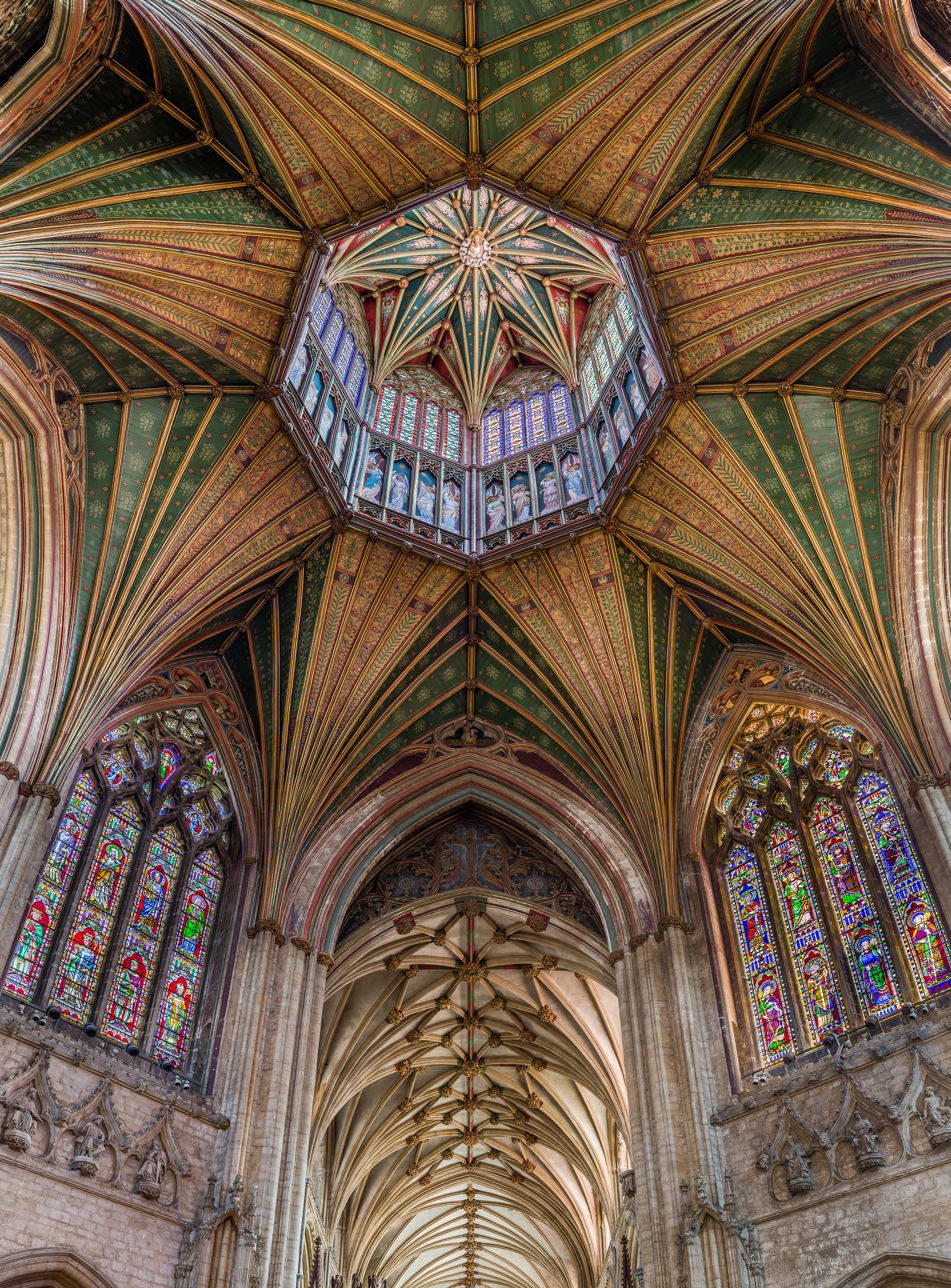
"The Octagon" at Ely Cathedral

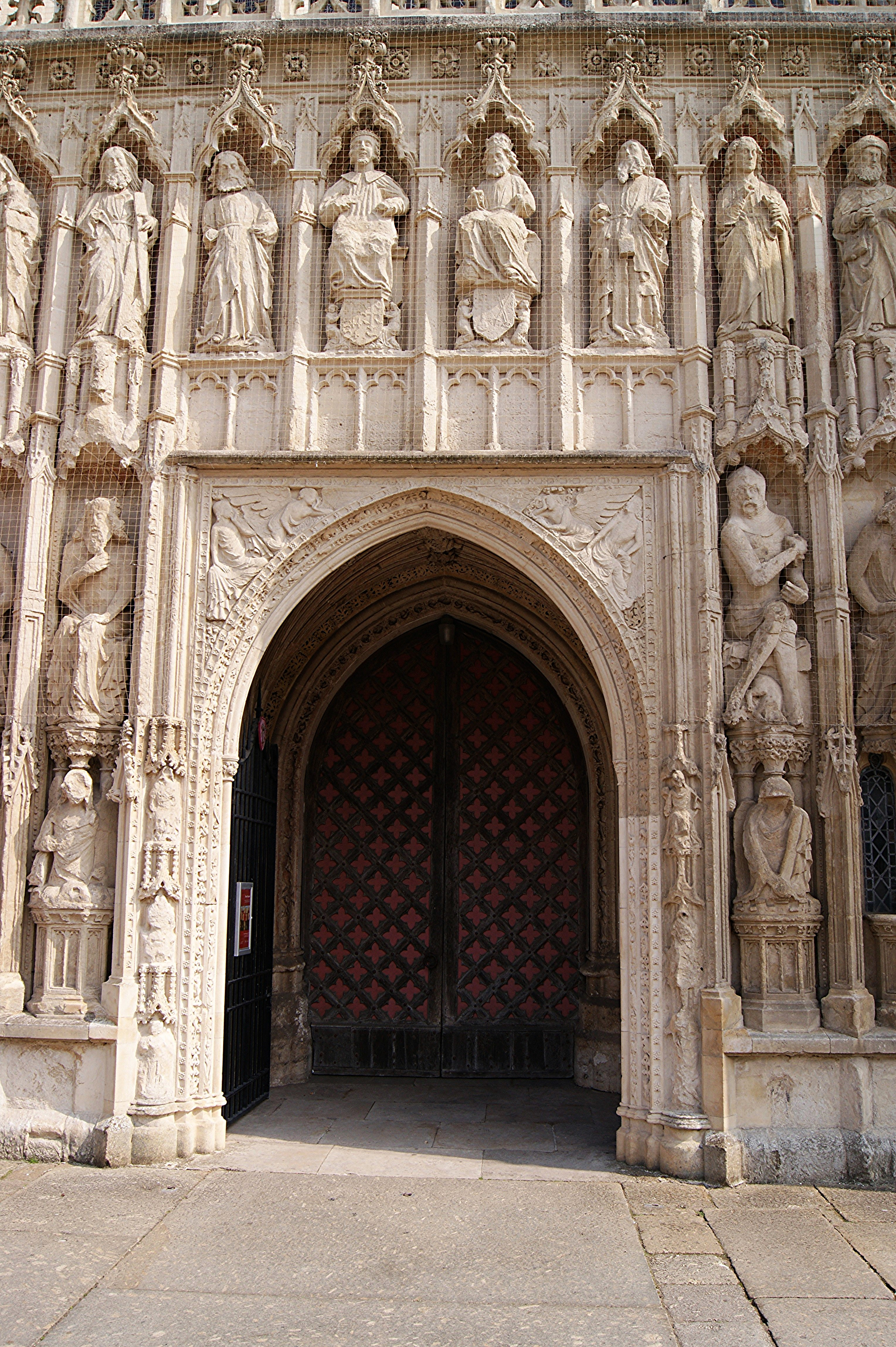
Detail of the west front at Exeter Cathedral

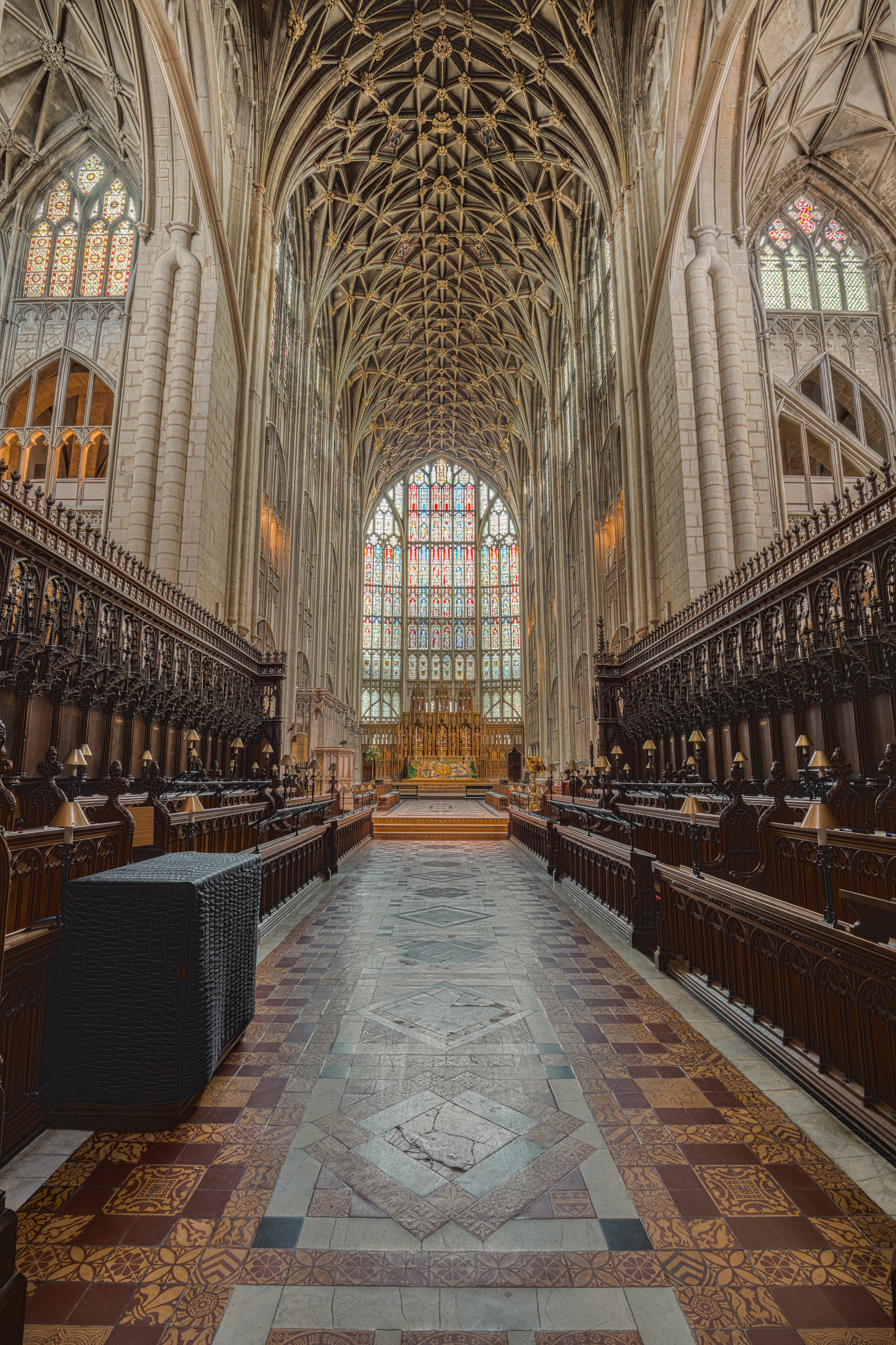
The Perpendicular chancel at Gloucester Cathedral

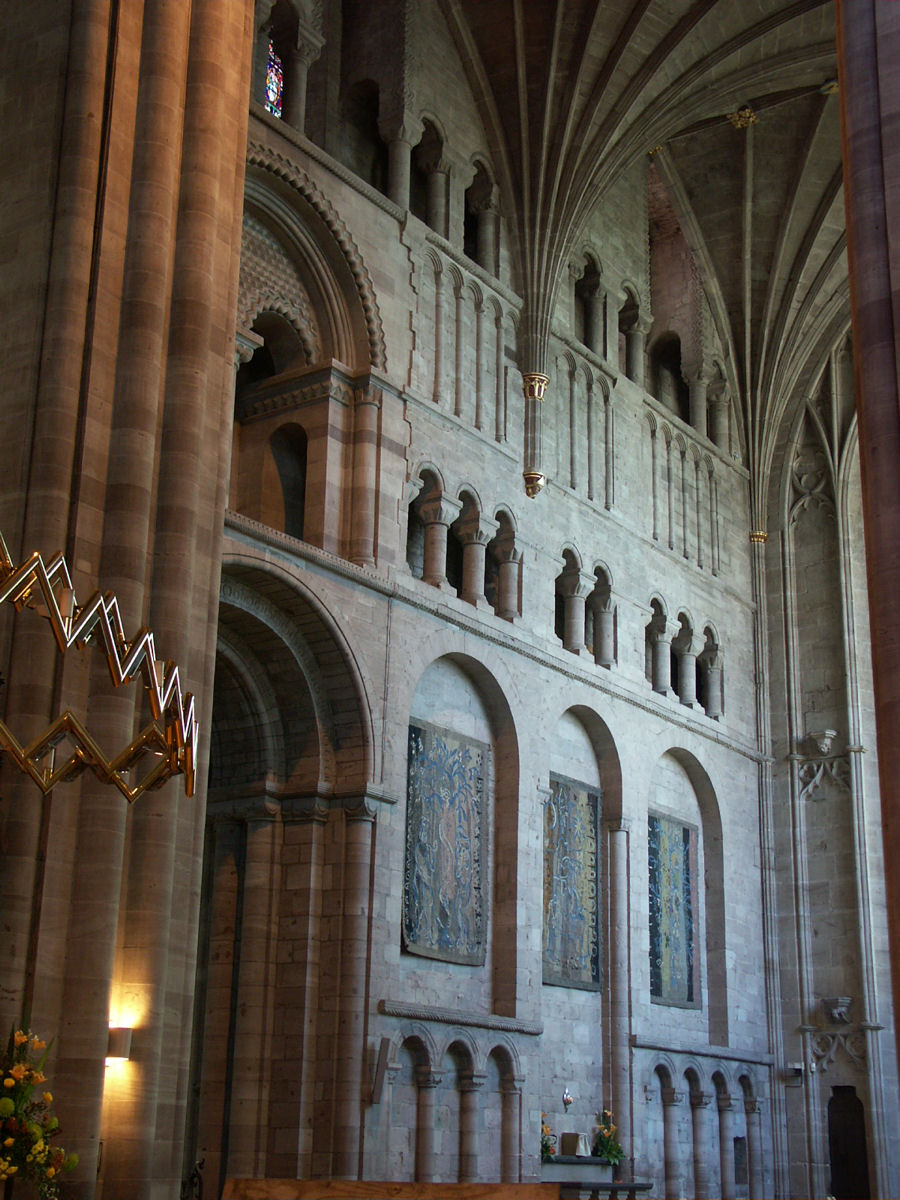
The 11th-century south transept at Hereford Cathedral

=== Lichfield Cathedral ===
Although dating from 1195 to about 1400, Lichfield Cathedral has an interior which presents a harmonious appearance, much of which is due to its having undergone extensive restoration and refurnishing in the 19th century. The nave is very fine and the Lady Chapel is apsidal with very tall windows, giving a rather French impression. Lichfield is the only one of the cathedrals to have retained three spires.

=== Lincoln Cathedral ===
Dating from 1074 to 1548, Lincoln Cathedral is one of the largest of England's cathedrals and it has been claimed by John Ruskin that, architecturally, it is worth any two of the others put together. Edward Freeman described it as "one of the loveliest of human works". It retains portions of the three massive arches of the Norman west front and much heavily restored sculpture around the central portal. The central tower is the tallest in England and is visible for many miles as it rises in spectacular fashion from a high hill. The decagonal Chapter House with its huge flying buttresses is the first polygonal chapter house in England. Of the interior, the finest part is considered to be the late-13th-century "Angel Choir" with "gorgeous layers of tracery" and enriched with carved angels. The transepts have two rose windows, the "Dean's Eye" on the north dating from c. 1200 and retaining its original glass, while the Flowing Decorated "Bishop's Eye" on the south is filled with salvaged medieval fragments.

=== Manchester Cathedral ===
Manchester Cathedral began as a parish church and was re-founded as a religious college in 1422, much of its structure being designed by John Wastell (1485 to 1506), then heavily restored in 1882. It is very different in style from the earlier great churches, sometimes being listed with the 13 Anglican "parish-church cathedrals". Double aisles give it the widest nave of any English cathedral (115 feet); and it also has the richest set of late medieval choir stalls and misericords (1505–09) in the country.

=== Norwich Cathedral ===
Built between 1096 and 1536, Norwich Cathedral has a Norman form, retaining the greater part of its original stone structure, which was then vaulted between 1416 and 1472 in a spectacular manner with hundreds of ornately carved, painted, and gilded bosses. It also has the finest Norman tower in England, surmounted by a 15th-century spire, and a large cloister with many more bosses.

=== Christ Church Cathedral, Oxford ===
Dating from 1158 to the early 16th century, Christ Church Cathedral, Oxford was always a small cathedral and was made smaller by the destruction of much of the nave in the 16th century. The stone spire, from 1230, is one of the oldest in England and contributes to Oxford's tradition as "the city of dreaming spires". Its most unusual feature is the late-15th-century pendant vault over the Norman chancel.

=== Peterborough Cathedral ===
Built between 1117 and 1508, Peterborough Cathedral is remarkable as the least altered of the Norman cathedrals with only its famous Early English west front, with its later porch and the Perpendicular rebuilding of the eastern ambulatory by John Wastell being in different styles. J.L. Cartwright wrote of the west front that it is "as magnificent an entrance to a sacred building as could well be imagined". The long wooden roof of the nave is original and has retained its painting from 1220.

Features

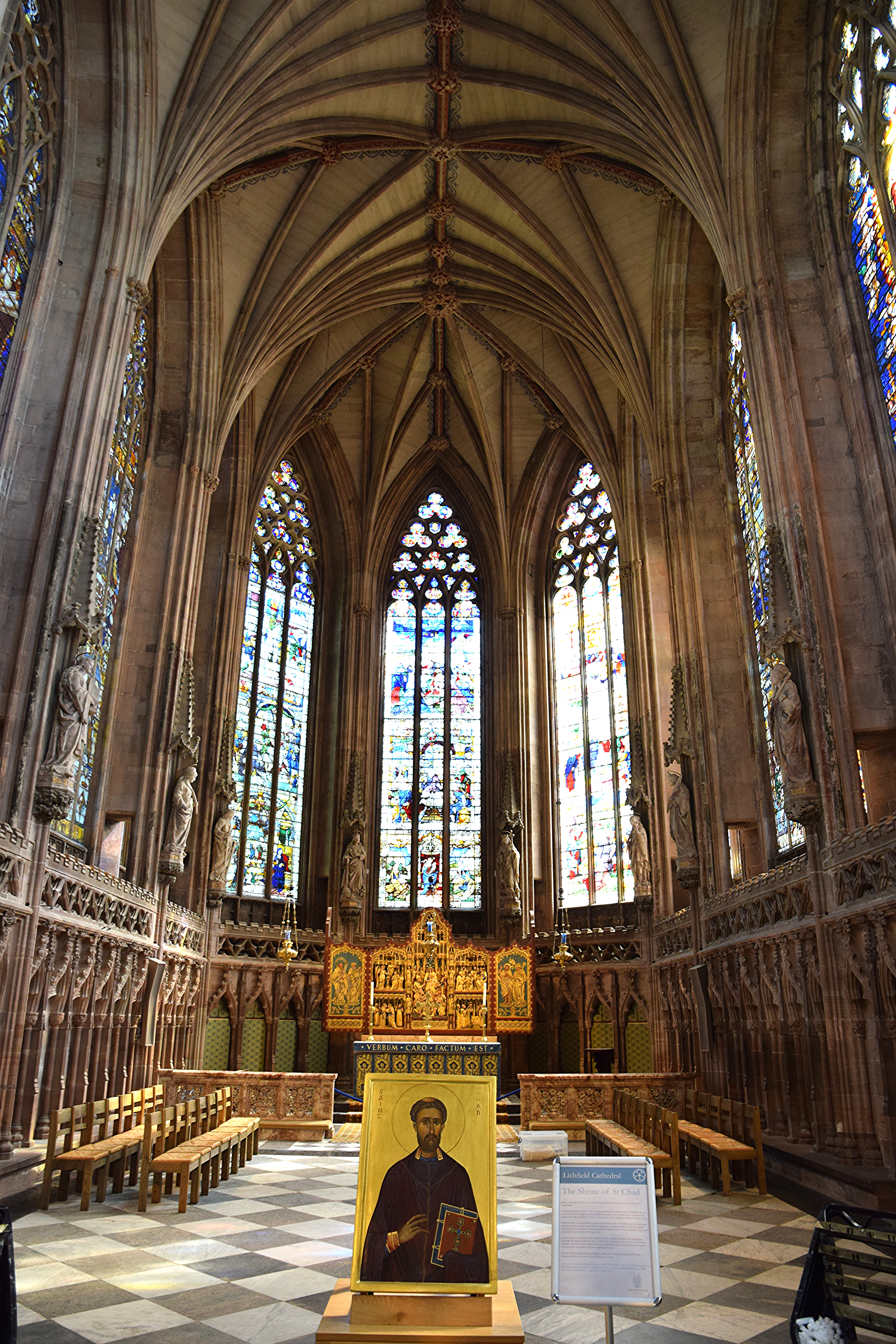
The Lady Chapel at Lichfield Cathedral

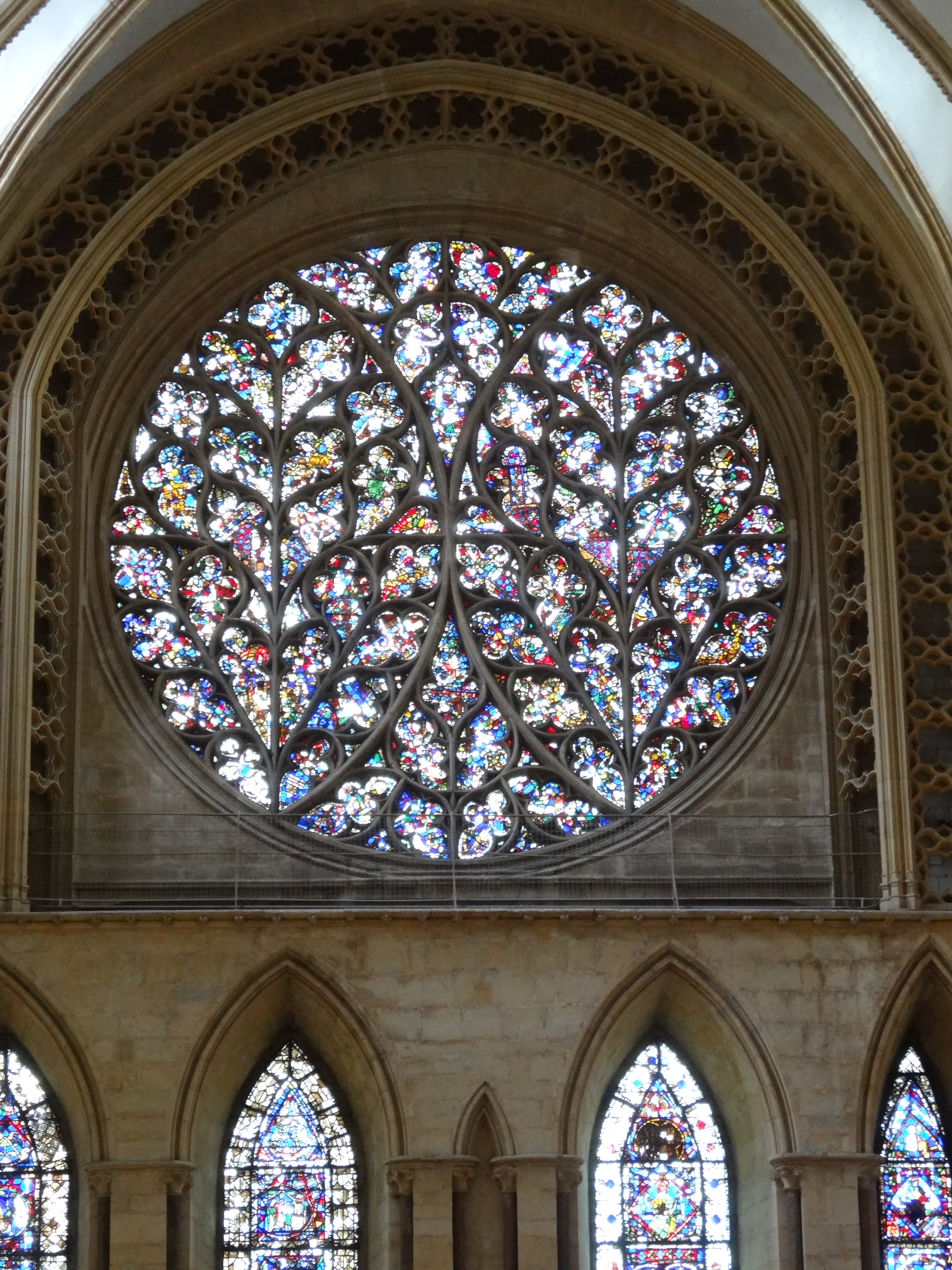
"The Bishop's Eye" at Lincoln Cathedral

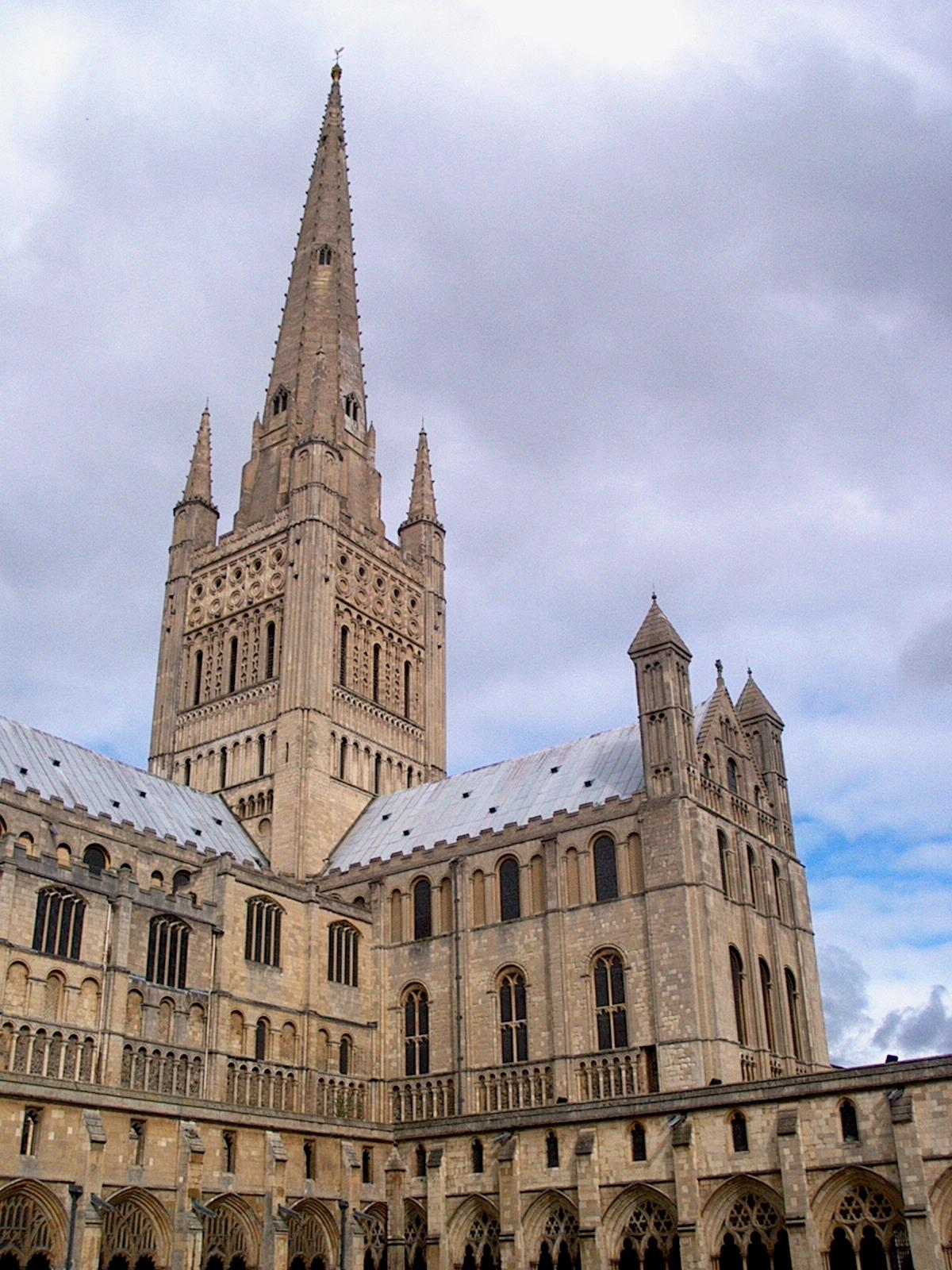
The Norman tower and 15th-century spire of Norwich Cathedral

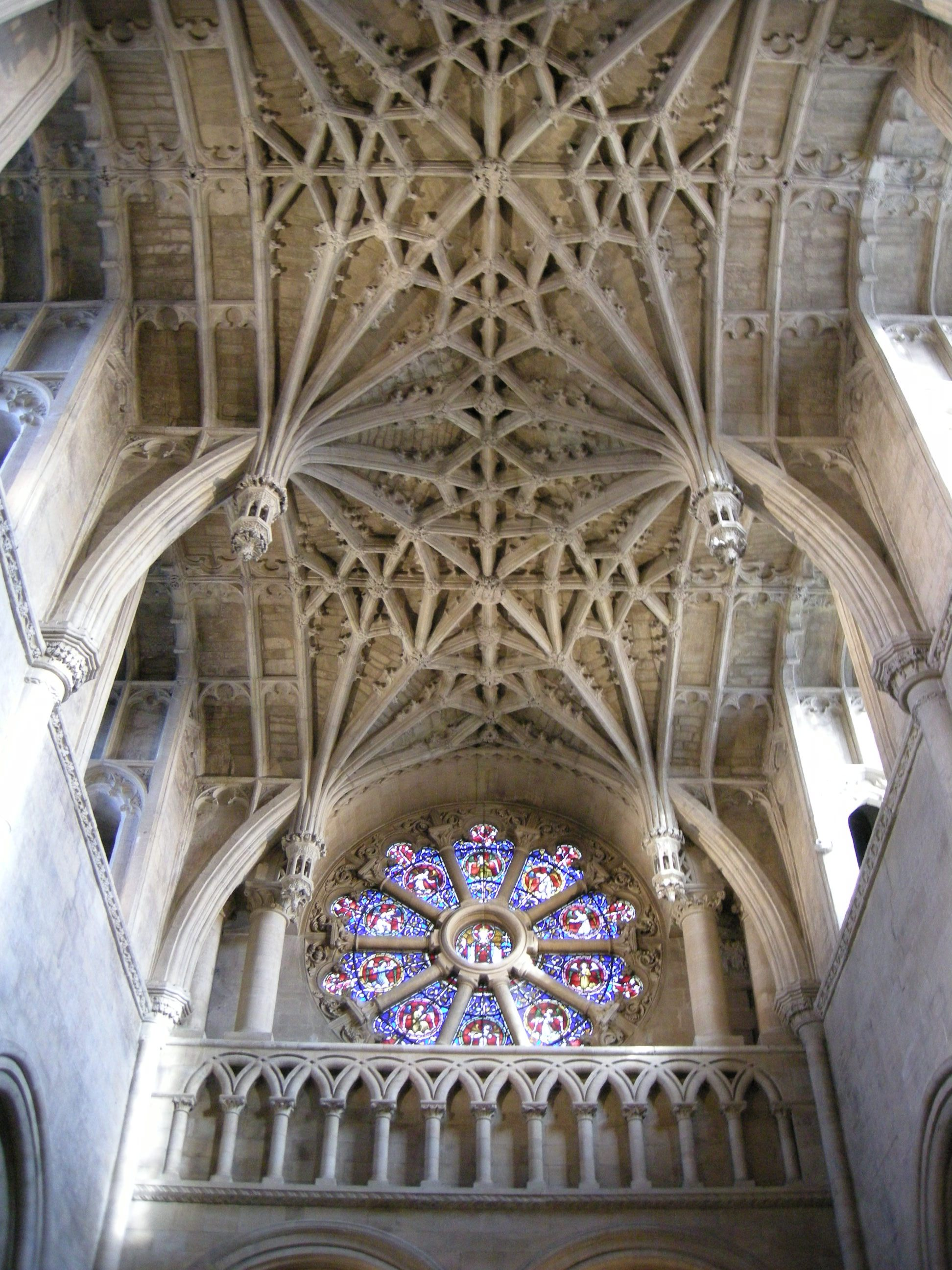
The pendant vaulting at Oxford Cathedral

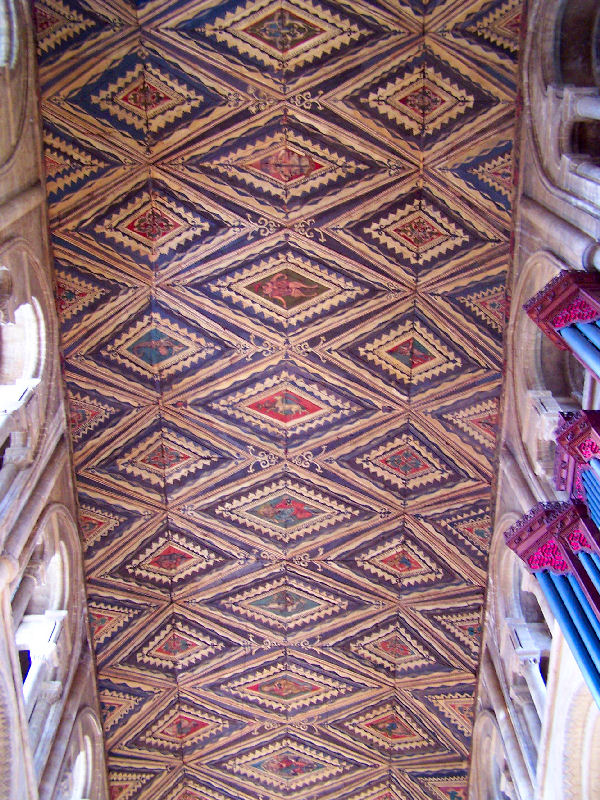
The painted wooden ceiling at Peterborough Cathedral

=== Ripon Cathedral ===
Dating from the 7th century to 1522, Ripon Cathedral preserves the crypt of the original church built by Saint Wilfred. The west front is an unaltered and harmonious composition in Early English Gothic. The choir has retained richly carved 14th-century stalls, famous for the many lively figures among the carvings.

=== Rochester Cathedral ===
Dating from 1177 to 1512, Rochester Cathedral has a Norman nave and crypt, and Early English choir. Its most remarkable feature is the rare, exuberantly carved Norman portal, which has, unfortunately, suffered much damage.

=== St Albans Cathedral ===
Built between 1077 and 1521, St Albans Cathedral is unique among the cathedrals in that much of it, including the large Norman tower, is built of bricks salvaged from the Roman town of Verulamium. Both internally and externally, the tower is the most significant feature. St Albans also retains some medieval wall paintings, as well as a painted wooden roof of the late 13th century.

=== Salisbury Cathedral ===
Built between 1220 and 1380 with additional structural reinforcement in the next century, Salisbury Cathedral epitomises the ideal English Cathedral, even though its stylistic unity makes it far from typical. Its fame lies in its harmonious proportions, particularly from the exterior, where the massing of the various horizontal parts in contrast to the vertical of the spire make it one of the most famous architectural compositions of the medieval period. Canon Smethurst wrote "It symbolises the peaceful loveliness of the English countryside..., the eternal truths of the Christian faith expressed in stone..."

=== Southwark Cathedral ===
Built between 1220 and 1420, Southwark Cathedral had its nave demolished and rebuilt in the late 19th century by Arthur Blomfield. It has a fine Early English tower and choir which retains an elaborate 16th-century reredos, fitted with statues replacing those destroyed in the 17th century.

Features

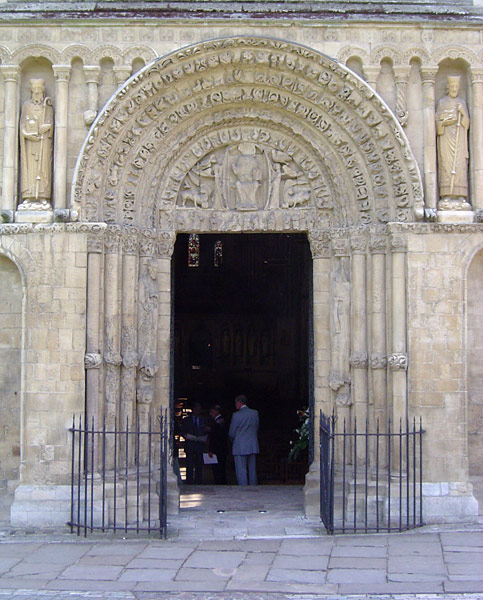
The Norman west door at Rochester Cathedral

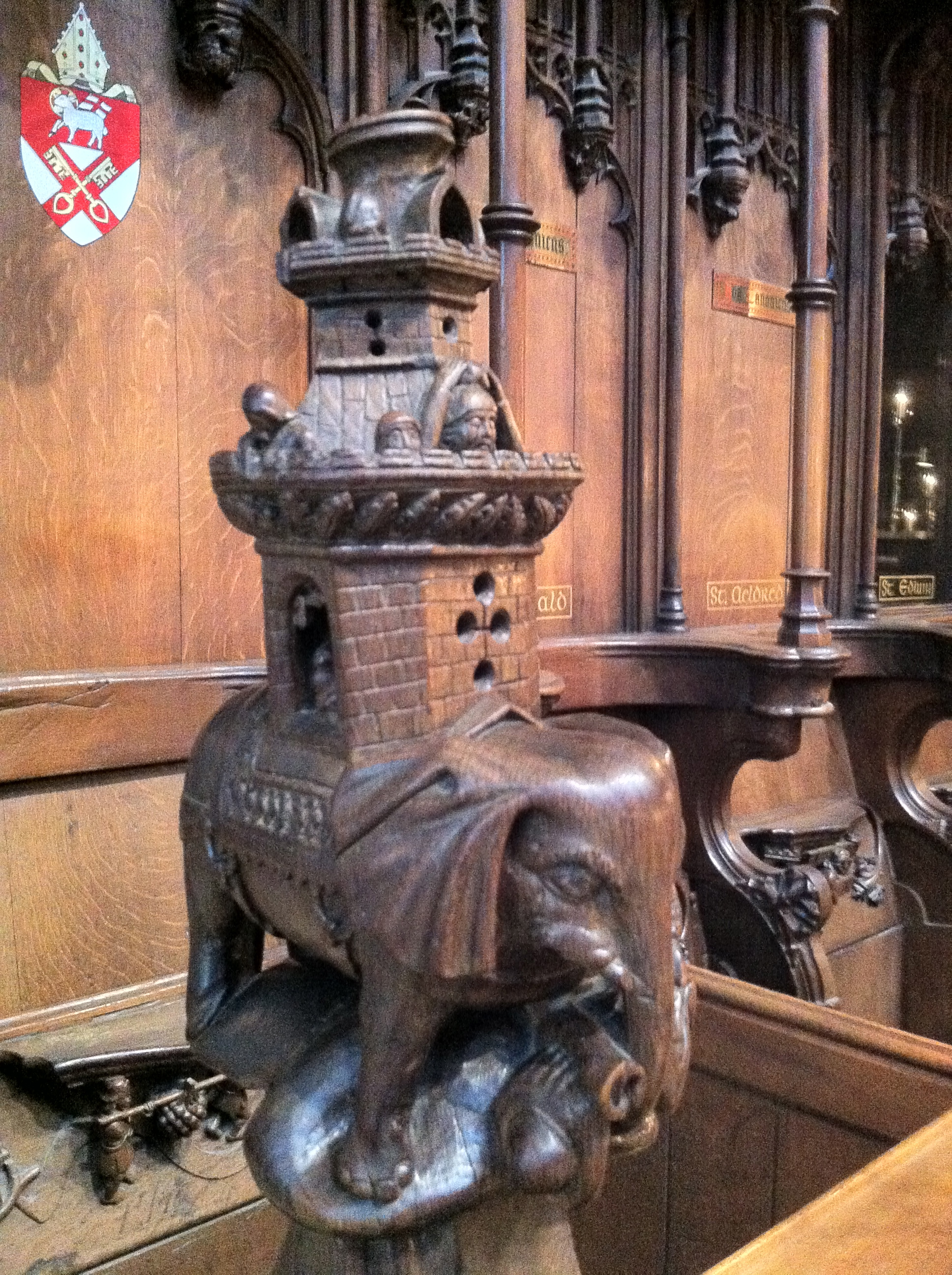
The Elephant and Castle in the choir stalls at Ripon Cathedral

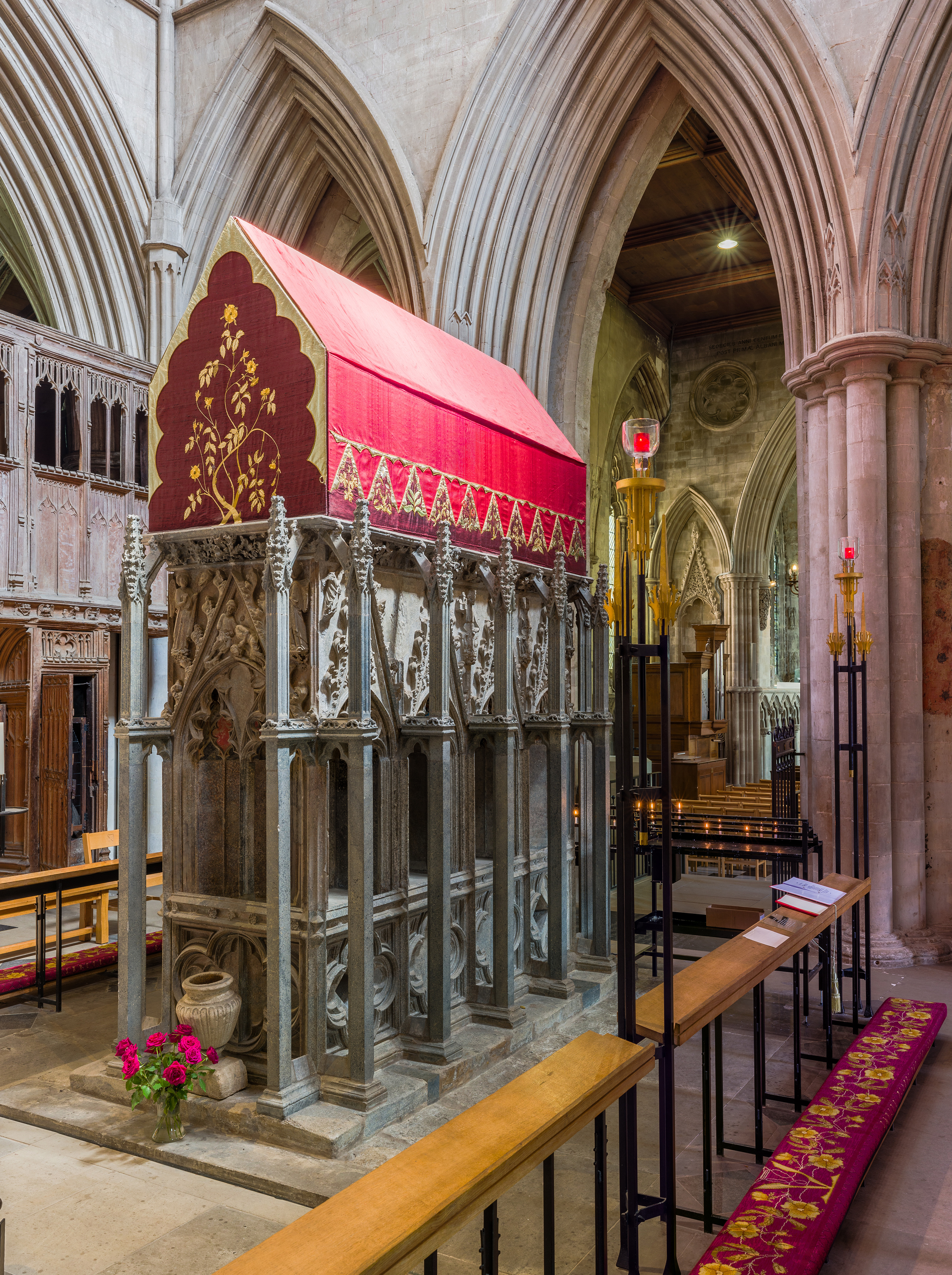
The Shrine of St Alban at St Albans Cathedral

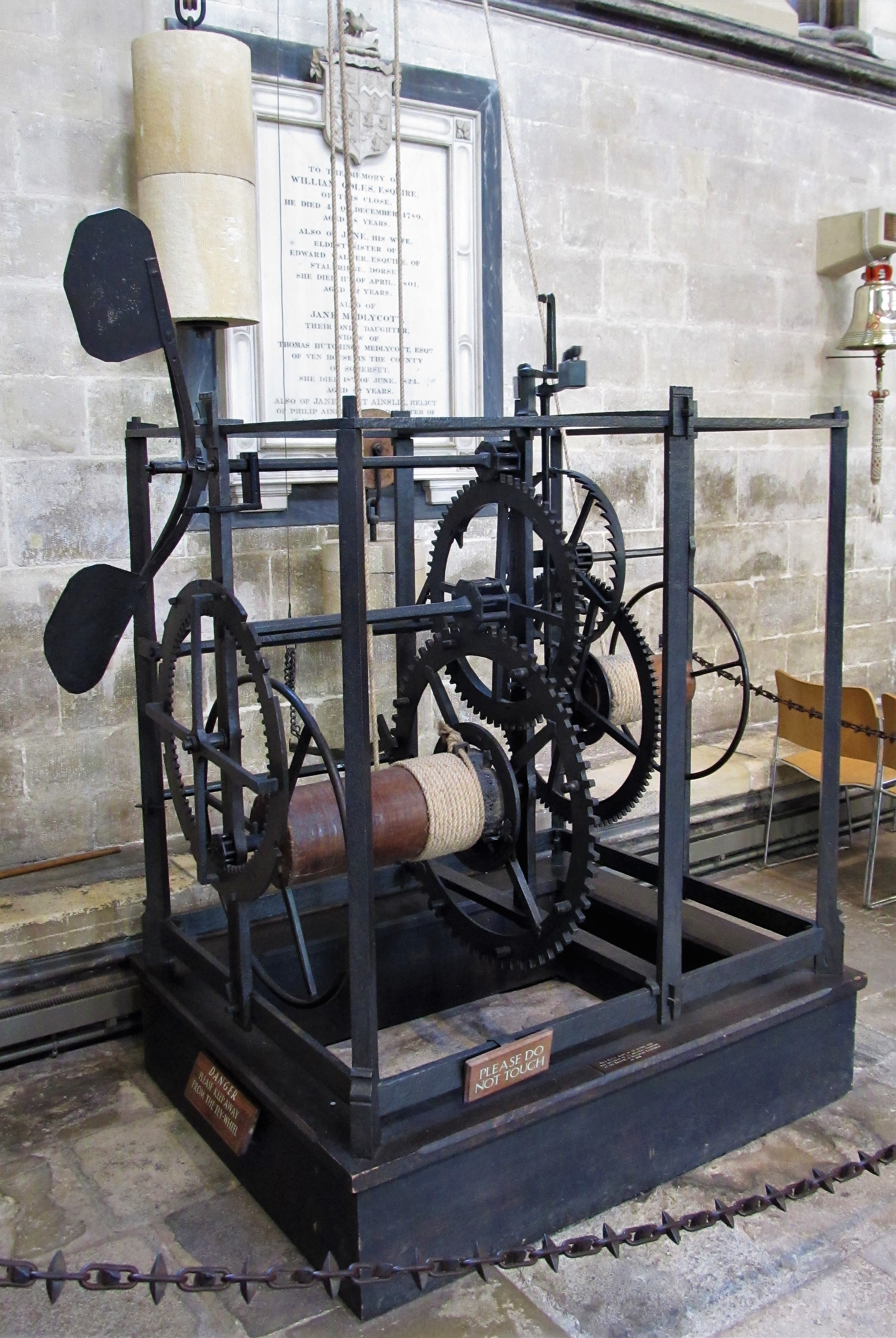
The medieval clock at Salisbury Cathedral is one of the oldest mechanical clocks in the world

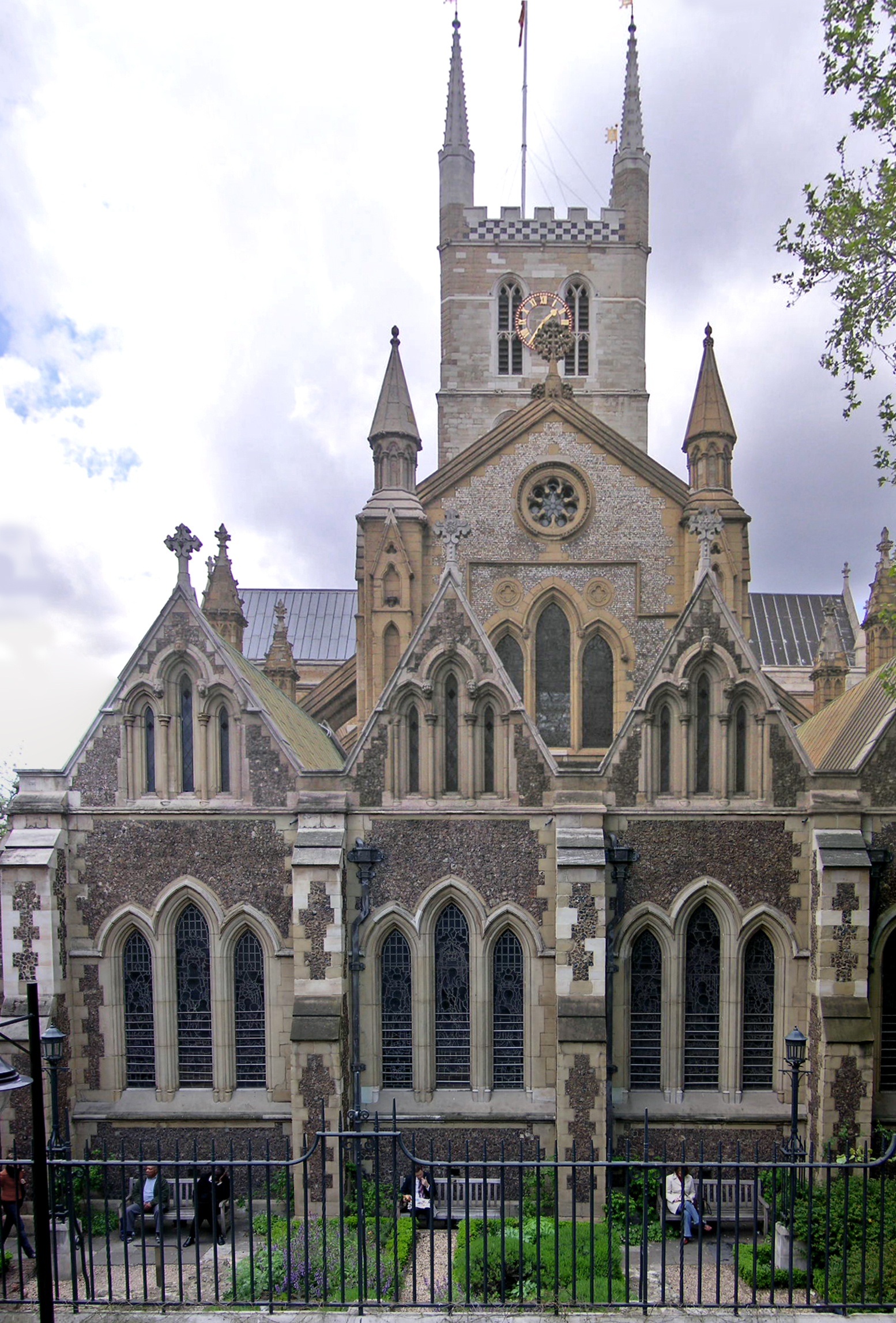
The Lancet Gothic east end and tower of Southwark Cathedral

=== Southwell Minster ===
Built between 1108 and 1520, Southwell Minster has its Norman façade intact, except for the insertion of a large window in the Perpendicular Style to give light to the Norman nave. The particular fame of Southwell is its late-13th-century chapter house, which contains the most famous mediaeval foliate carvings in England, "The Leaves of Southwell", described by Nikolaus Pevsner as "throbbing with life".

=== Wells Cathedral ===
Built between 1175 and 1490, Wells Cathedral has been described as "the most poetic of the English Cathedrals". Much of the structure is in the Early English style and is greatly enriched by the deeply sculptural nature of the mouldings and the vitality of the carved capitals in a foliate style known as "stiff leaf". The eastern end has retained much original glass, which is rare in England. The exterior has the finest Early English façade and a large central tower. A unique feature of the building is the "Scissor Arches" spanning the crossing, built in the mid-14th century by William Joy in order to stabilise the central tower.

=== Winchester Cathedral ===
Built between 1079 and 1532, Winchester Cathedral has had an unusual architectural history. The exterior, apart from the modified windows, gives the impression of a massive Norman building and indeed, it is the longest medieval church in the world. However, the west front is now Perpendicular, with its huge window filled with fragments of medieval glass. Inside, only the crypt and the transepts have retained their Norman appearance. The spectacular Perpendicular nave with its tall arcade arches and strong vertical emphasis has been literally carved out of the original Norman interior. A former dean, the Very Rev. Norman Sykes, wrote of it "Well might the visitor who enters ... by the west door gasp with amazement." Winchester is also famous for its carved wooden fittings of many different periods.

=== Worcester Cathedral ===
Built between 1084 and 1504, Worcester Cathedral represents every medieval style from Norman to Perpendicular. It is famous for its Norman crypt, and for its circular chapter house, which became the model from which derives the series of uniquely British polygonal chapter houses. Also notable are a series of unusual Transitional Gothic bays, fine woodwork and the central tower, which, though not large, is nevertheless of particularly fine proportions.

=== York Minster ===
Built between 1154 and 1500, York Minster is one of the largest Gothic churches in the world. Without having the elevated positions of Durham or Lincoln it dominates the city skyline from all angles, and its great size can be seen on a clear day from as far away as the North York Moors. The deceptively simple plan with square eastern and western ends and a single transept dividing the building into equal parts belies the architectural richness of this building. The remains of the Norman crypt indicate that the older building must have been as massive and ornamental in its architecture as Durham. The Early English transepts are both famous, that of the south having a complex arrangements of lancets and a rose window making up an entrance façade. On the north side are lancet windows called the "Five Sisters" each only 5 feet (1.5 m) wide, but 57 feet (17 m) tall. The interior of York is very spacious. The West front with its paired towers is a harmonious arrangement of the late Decorated period and the large central window has fine Flowing Decorated tracery called the "Heart of Yorkshire", while the large eastern window is Perpendicular in style. A rare feature of York Minster is that these important windows have all retained their medieval glass, from c. 1270, 1335 and 1405, respectively.

Features

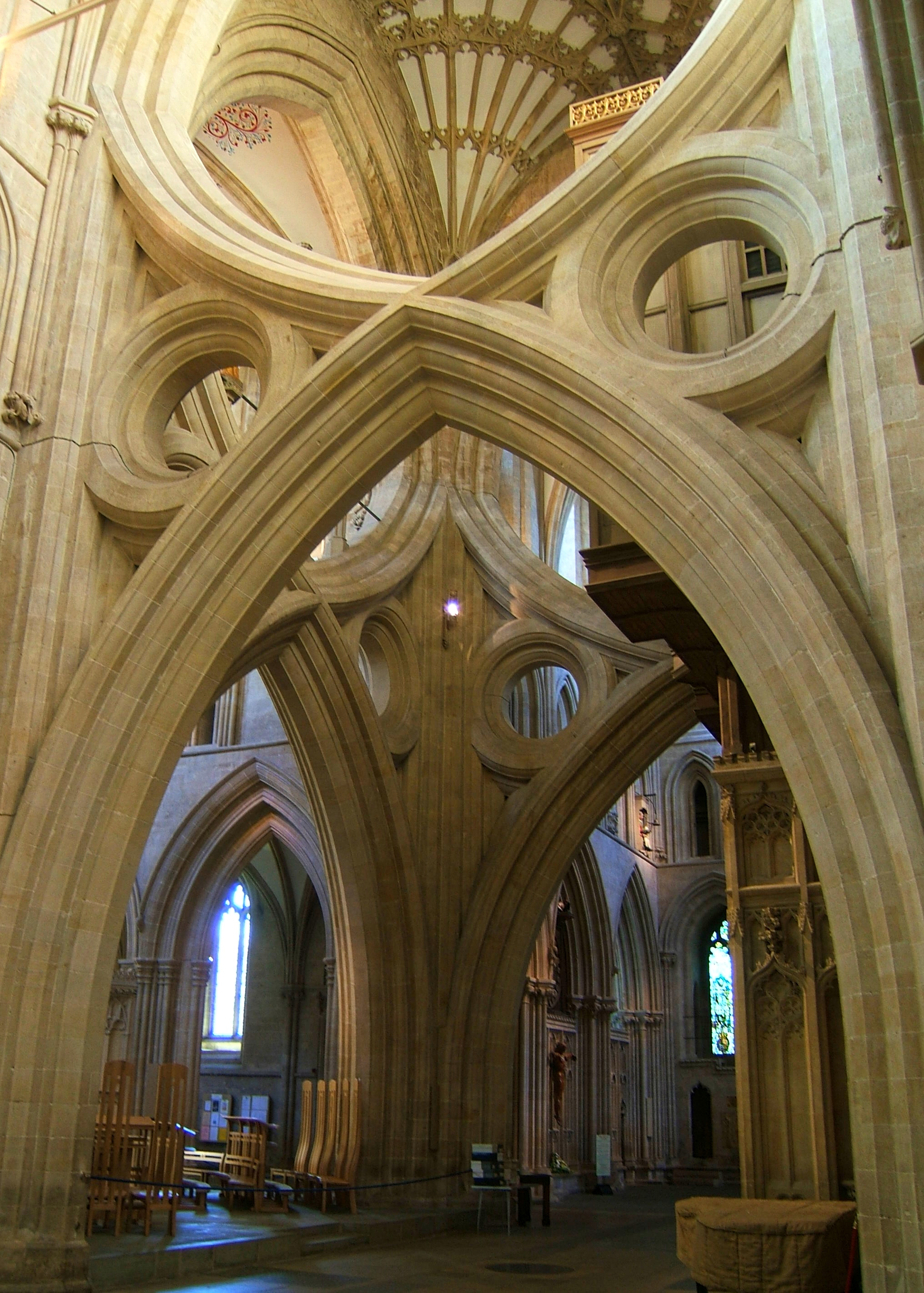
The St Andrew’s Cross or "scissor" arches at Wells Cathedral, added after it was feared there was instability

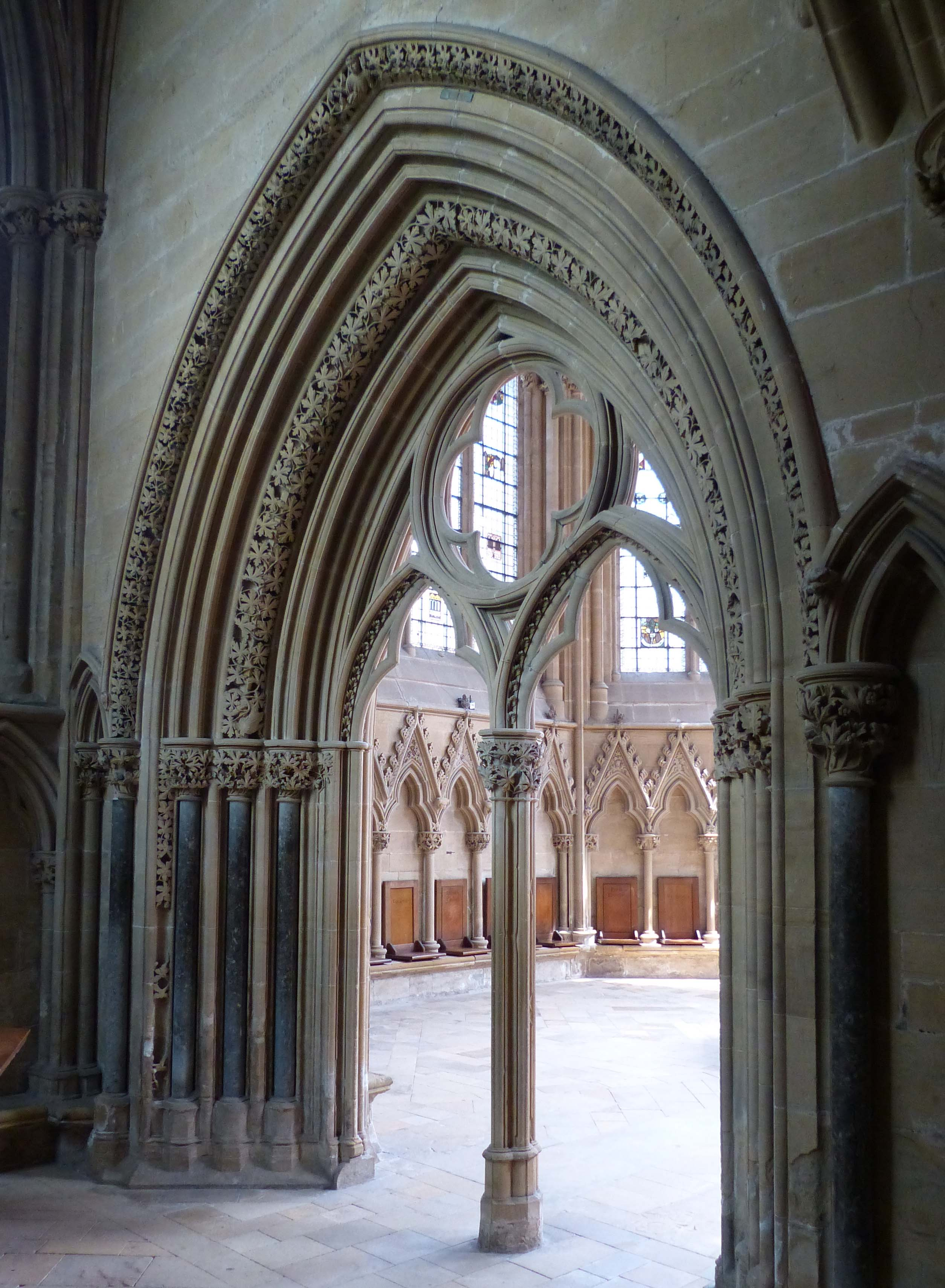
The Chapter House at Southwell Cathedral has naturalistic carved flora

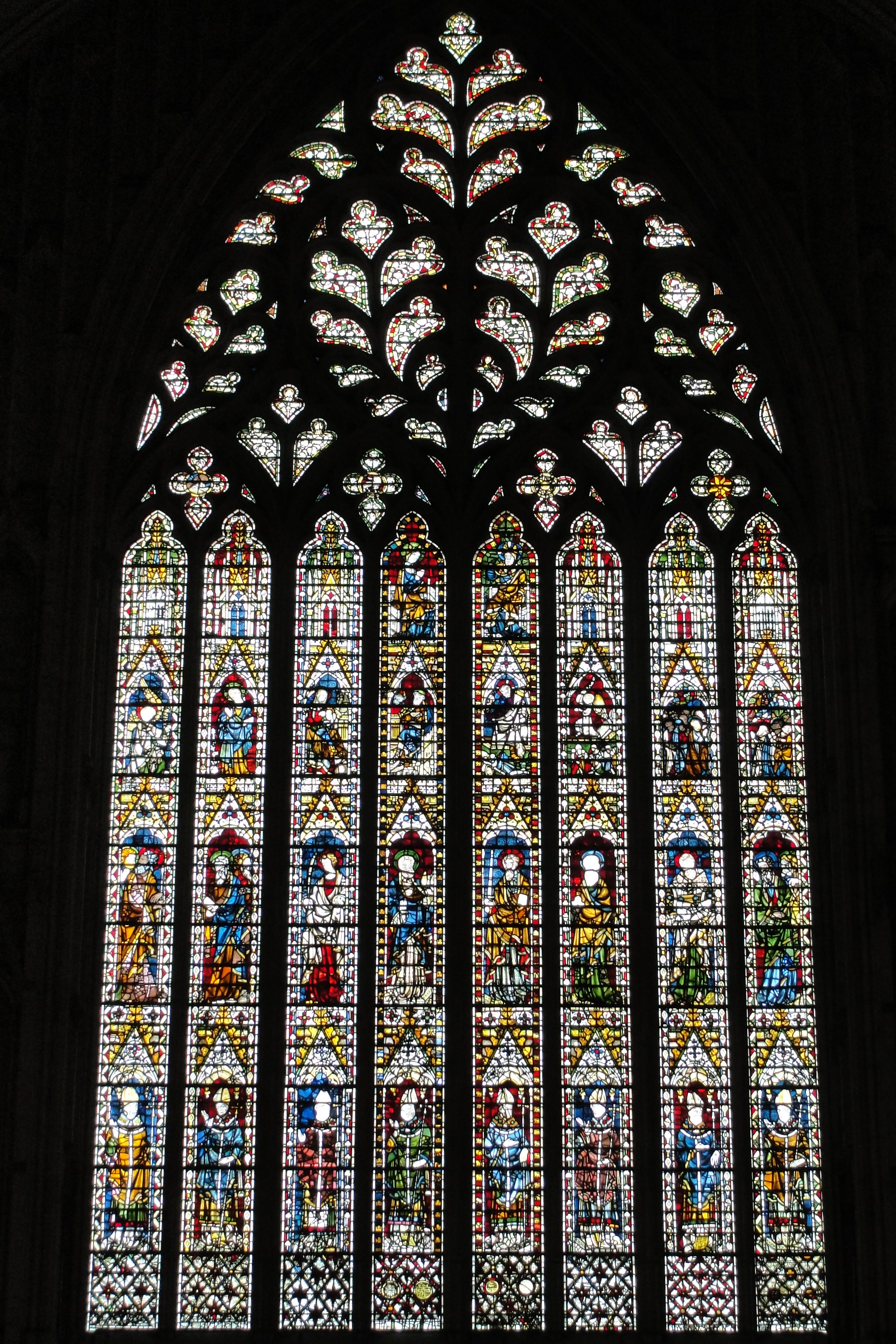
The west window of York Minster

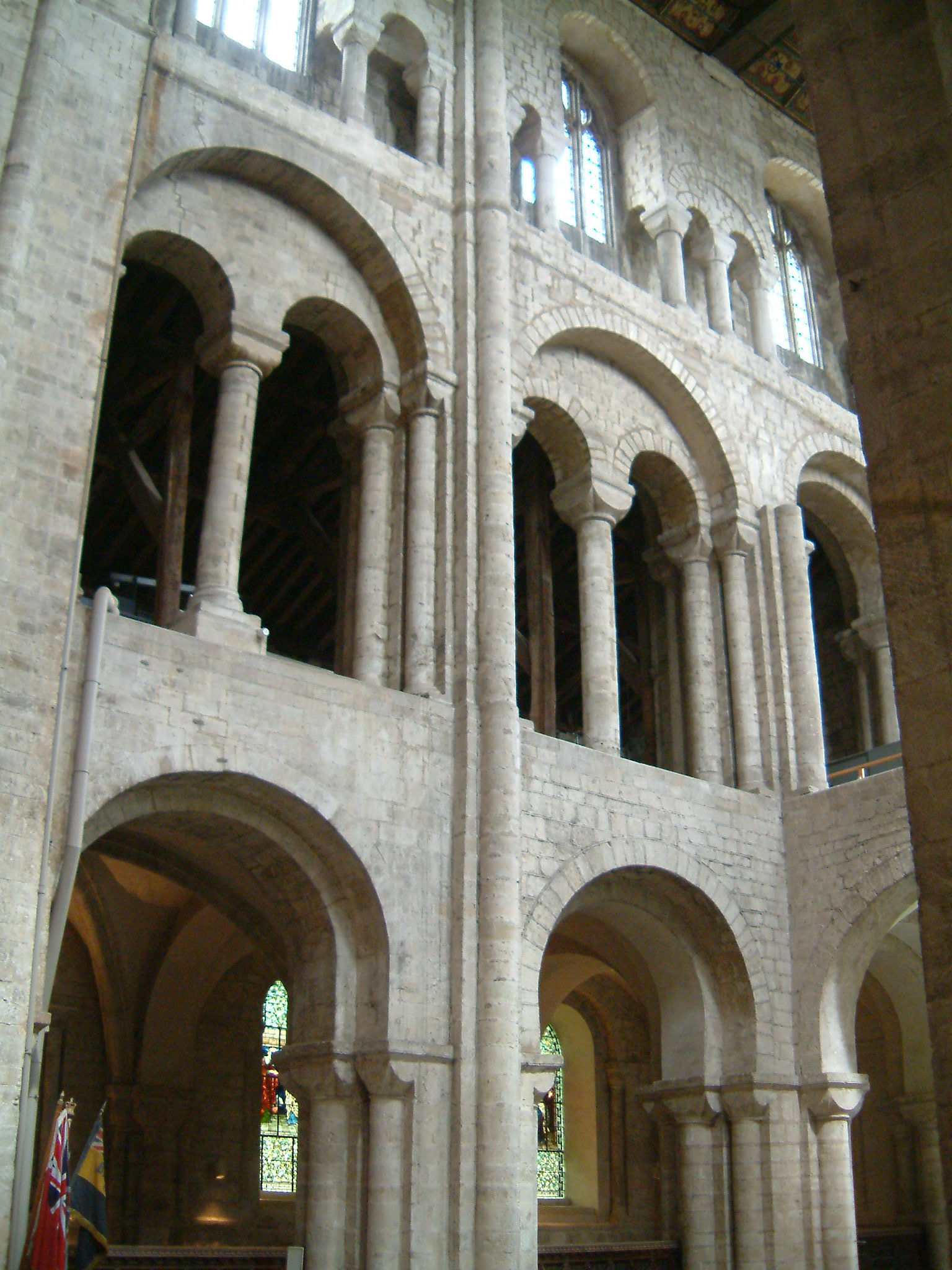
The north transept at Winchester Cathedral

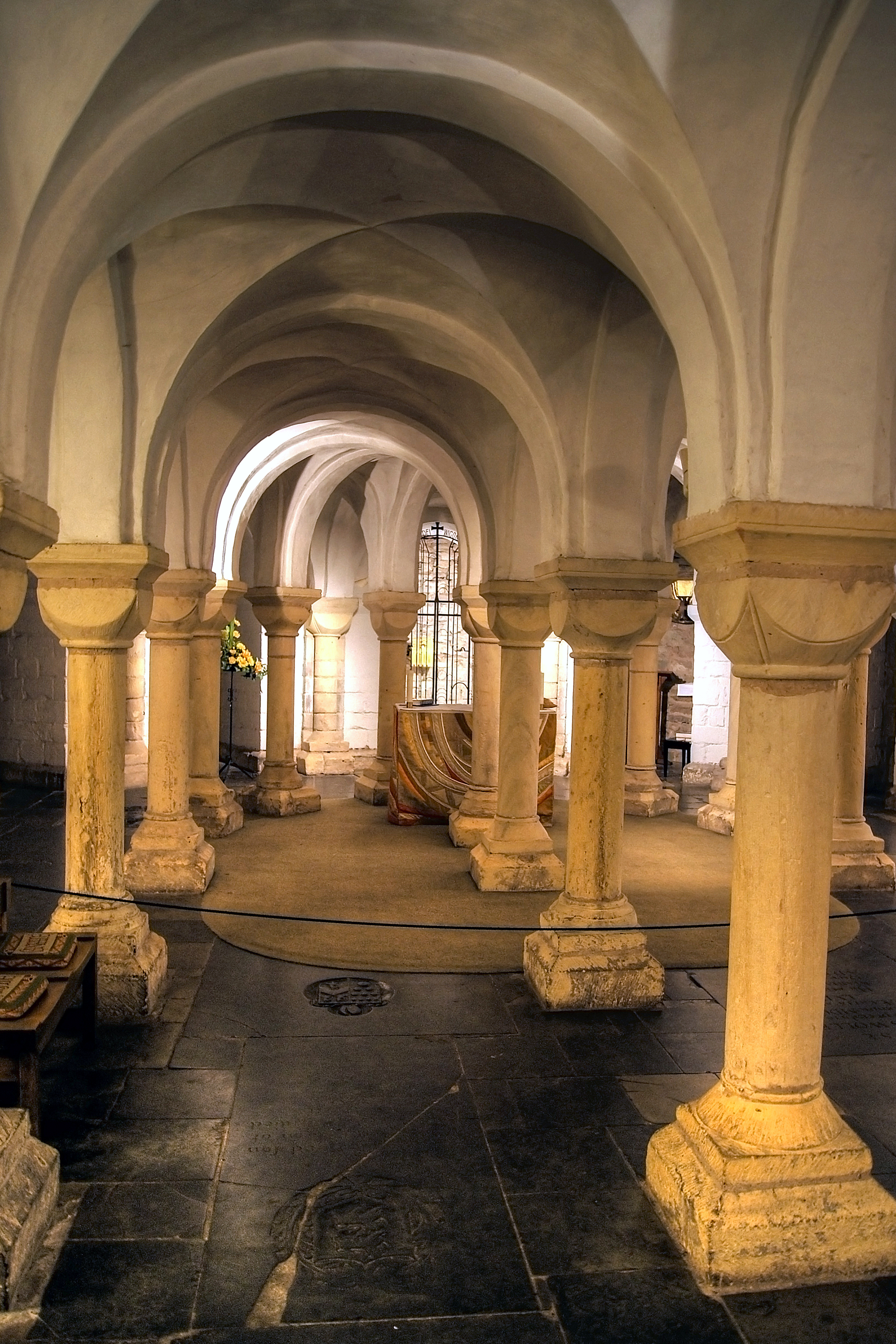
The Norman crypt at Worcester Cathedral

== Architects ==
The researches of John Harvey have uncovered the names of many English medieval architects, and by tracing stylistic characteristics, it has sometimes proved possible to track their careers from one building to another. Leading architects were highly paid – especially those employed in the king's works – and they can often be identified from regular payments in cathedral accounts.

No architectural drawings survive for any English cathedral earlier than 1525 (although an engineer's design for a proposed new water supply at Canterbury cathedral priory exists in a 12th-century plan). Architectural details, such as window tracery designs, were not executed as scale drawings, but were incised full-size onto a large flat gypsum tracing-floor, examples of which survive at York and Wells.

Medieval construction was seasonal, work on site being undertaken only in the spring and summer, when the light was good and the weather more reliable. Each autumn, all exposed surfaces were covered and lagged against frost damage. The architects worked over winter in the tracing house (that of York has both a fireplace and a privy) to prepare designs for the next season's campaign. They translated the designs into sets of planed oak cross-sectional templates, which were given to the stone-cutters. Construction of cathedrals and major churches almost invariably started at the eastern arm, and then proceeded westwards, with towers erected last.

- Robert the Mason, c 1100, St Albans abbey
- William of Sens, d 1184, Canterbury choir
- William the Englishman d 1214, Canterbury choir
- Elias of Dereham d 1246, Salisbury
- Michael of Canterbury d 1321, Canterbury
- Henry Wy c 1324, St Albans nave
- John de Ramsey d 1349, Norwich, Ely
- William de Ramsey d 1349, Norwich, Ely, Old St Paul's chapter house, Lichfield presbytery
- William Hurley d 1354, Ely lantern
- Richard of Farleigh d 1364, Salisbury north-east gate and wall around the close, Exeter
- Alan of Walsingham d 1364, Ely octagon
- John Clyve d 1374, Worcester nave, tower, west front
- Henry Yevele d 1400, Canterbury nave, Durham Neville screen
- William Wynford d 1405, Winchester nave, Wells west towers.
- Thomas Mapilton d 1438, Canterbury SW tower
- William Smyth d 1490, Wells crossing tower fan vault
- William Orchard (architect) d 1504, Oxford vaults
- John Wastell d 1515, Canterbury tower, Peterborough retrochoir, Manchester

== See also ==
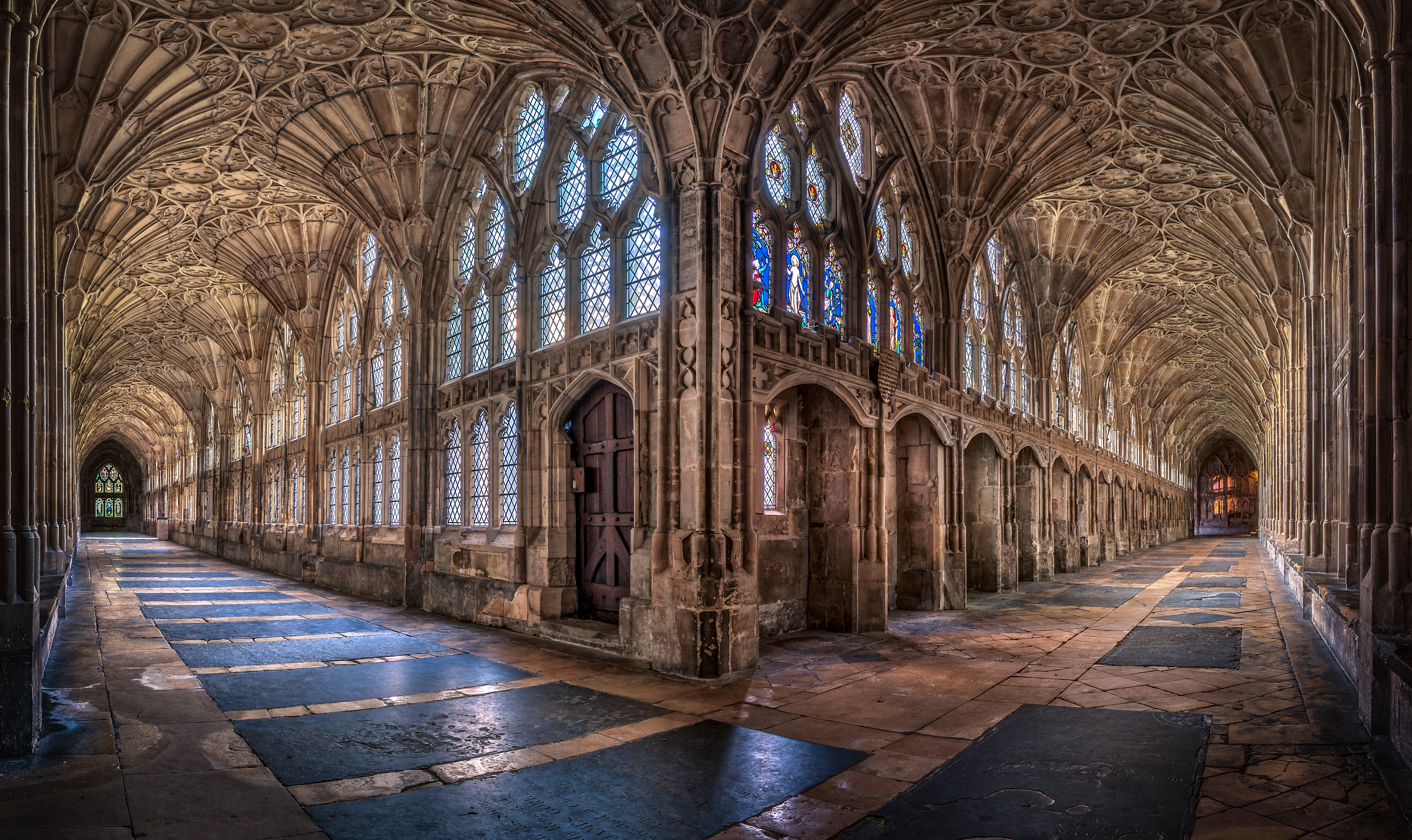
The fan-vaulted cloister of Gloucester Cathedral.

- Gothic cathedrals and churches
- Architecture of cathedrals and great churches
- English Gothic architecture
- British and Irish stained glass (1811–1918)
- List of cathedrals in the United Kingdom
- List of regional characteristics of European cathedral architecture

== Notes ==
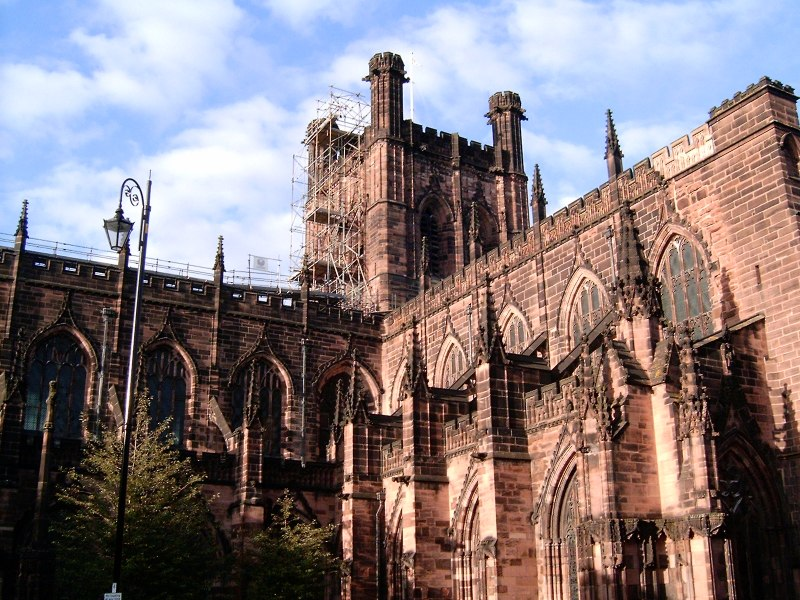
The Decorated Gothic exterior of Chester Cathedral.

== External links to cathedral websites ==
- Bristol Cathedral, official website
- Canterbury Cathedral, official website
- Carlisle Cathedral, official website
- Chester Cathedral, official website
- Chichester Cathedral, official website
- Durham Cathedral, official website
- Ely Cathedral, official website
- Exeter Cathedral, official website
- Gloucester Cathedral, official website
- Hereford Cathedral, official website
- Lichfield Cathedral, official site
- Lincoln Cathedral, official site
- Norwich Cathedral, official website
- Christ Church Cathedral, Oxford, official website
- Peterborough Cathedral, official website
- Portsmouth Cathedral, official website
- Ripon Cathedral, official website
- Rochester Cathedral, official website
- St Albans Cathedral, official website
- Salisbury Cathedral, official website
- Southwark Cathedral, official website
- Southwell Minster, official website
- Wells Cathedral, official website
- Winchester Cathedral, official website
- Worcester Cathedral, official website
- York Minster, official website
