= St Michael at Plea =

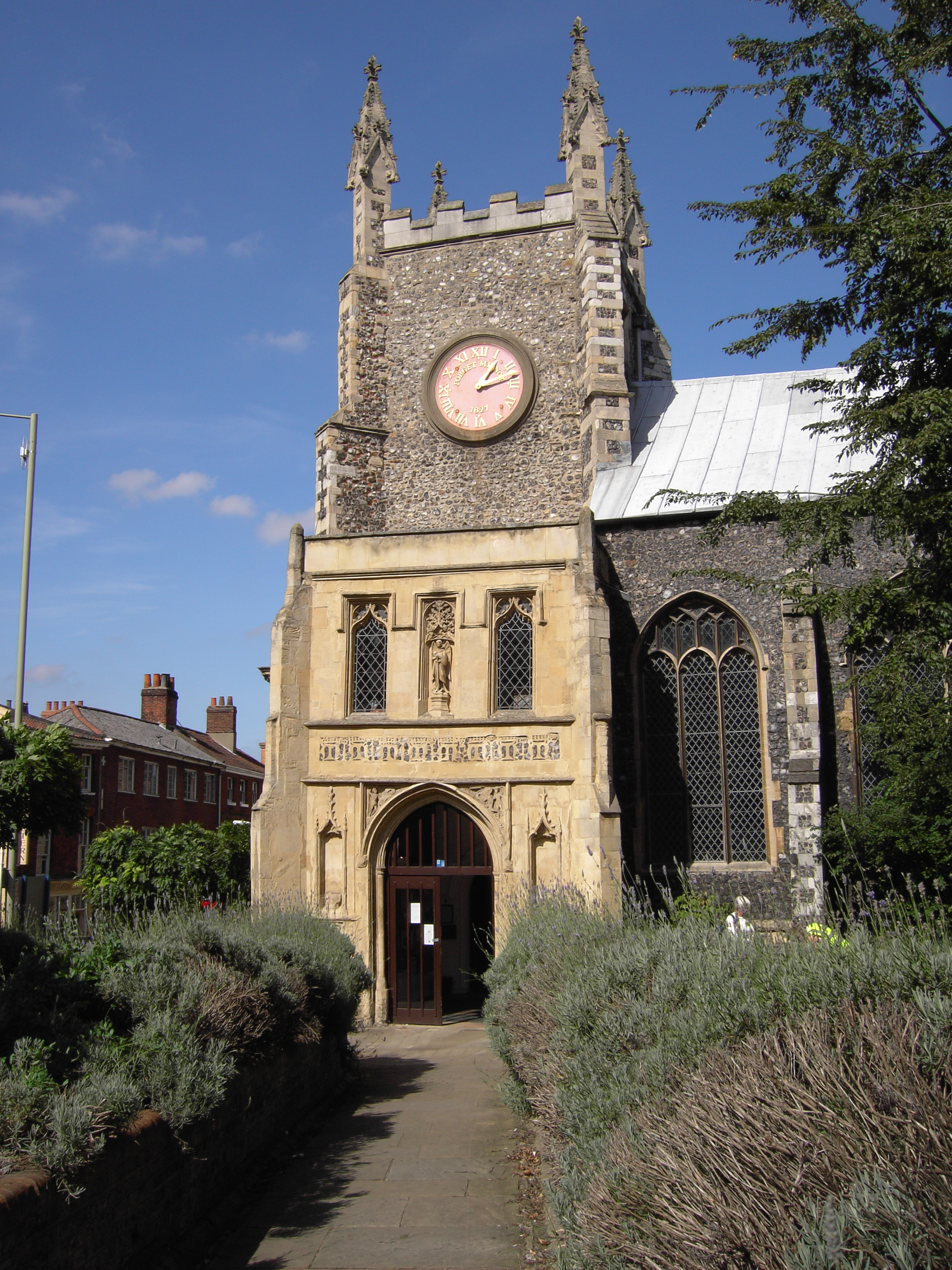
- St Michael at Plea in 2006
- St Michael at Plea
- 52°37′49.08″N 1°17′49.75″E
- OS grid reference: TG 23235 08742
- Location: Norwich, Norfolk
- Country: England
- Denomination: Church of England
- Website: thechurchpianobar.co.uk

History
- Dedication: St Michael

Architecture
- Heritage designation: Grade I listed
- Closed: 1971

St Michael at Plea is a Grade I listed, redundant parish church in Norwich, England, situated on Redwell Street. It is formerly affiliated with the Church of England. It was in existence as early as 1126, though the current building is largely from c. 1430–68. After its closure in 1971 it spent time as a Christian bookshop and as of 2026 is operating as The Church, a piano bar.

== Dedication and specification ==
St Michael at Plea is one of five churches in Norwich and over 600 in the United Kingdom that are dedicated to the archangel Michael. The specification of the church 'at Plea' or ad placita meaning 'plural', was in use by 1150. This could refer to a setting for an ecclesiastical or secular court as per some sources such as Francis Blomefield, though it could have also referred to a decanal court due to its association with Turbert the dean. St Michael at Plea was also known as St Michael Mostow, meaning 'place where assemblies are held', which may have referred to a leet or urban court. It may have been a site for a Hundred or shire court given its name's similarity to that of Lincoln's former church St Peter ad placita, a possible residence of Earl Morcar.

== History ==
In 1126–7, Stigand the priest, with the assent of his son Turbern or Turbert, granted St Benet's Abbey in Norfolk the right to nominate St Michael at Plea's rector. The gift was significant, being confirmed by the Bishop of Norwich and Archbishop of Canterbury. Thomas of Ludham, who was Stigand the priest's grandson, was appointed as the church's incumbent by the time of the abbot William of St Benet's (1153–68) and remained there until at least the 1190s. By the late 13th century, a branch of the Bacon family held the right to appoint a rector at St Michael's, rather than the earlier arrangement with St Benet's.

The present church building is medieval, dating from the 15th century, mostly from the period c. 1430–68.

In 1589, St Michael at Plea's rector Rowland Nutt, who had been as such since 1586, was censured by the Court of High Commission during an attempted search for Martin Marprelate. He, along with rector of St Peter Hungate John Burgess and chaplain of St Martin at Palace John Harrison, failed to appear before the Ecclesiastical Commission and were thus declared contumacious. He was unable to regain his position at St Michael at Plea, instead preaching at St Andrew's.

During the Reformation, the church spent £20 on "the new glazing of 17 windows," replacing previous designs that depicted "profane histories" as well as other old windows. The house of Norwich sheriff Captain Thomas Ashwell stood next to the church in 1648, when the house was looted during the Great Blow riot.

The church was restored in 1887; a partition separating the chancel from the nave was removed, and new windows were inserted in the transepts. The box pews were replaced with chairs and the angels in the roof were gilded. The church purchased an organ dating from 1887 by Norman and Beard.

The church was designated a Grade I listed building in 1954.

=== Redundancy ===
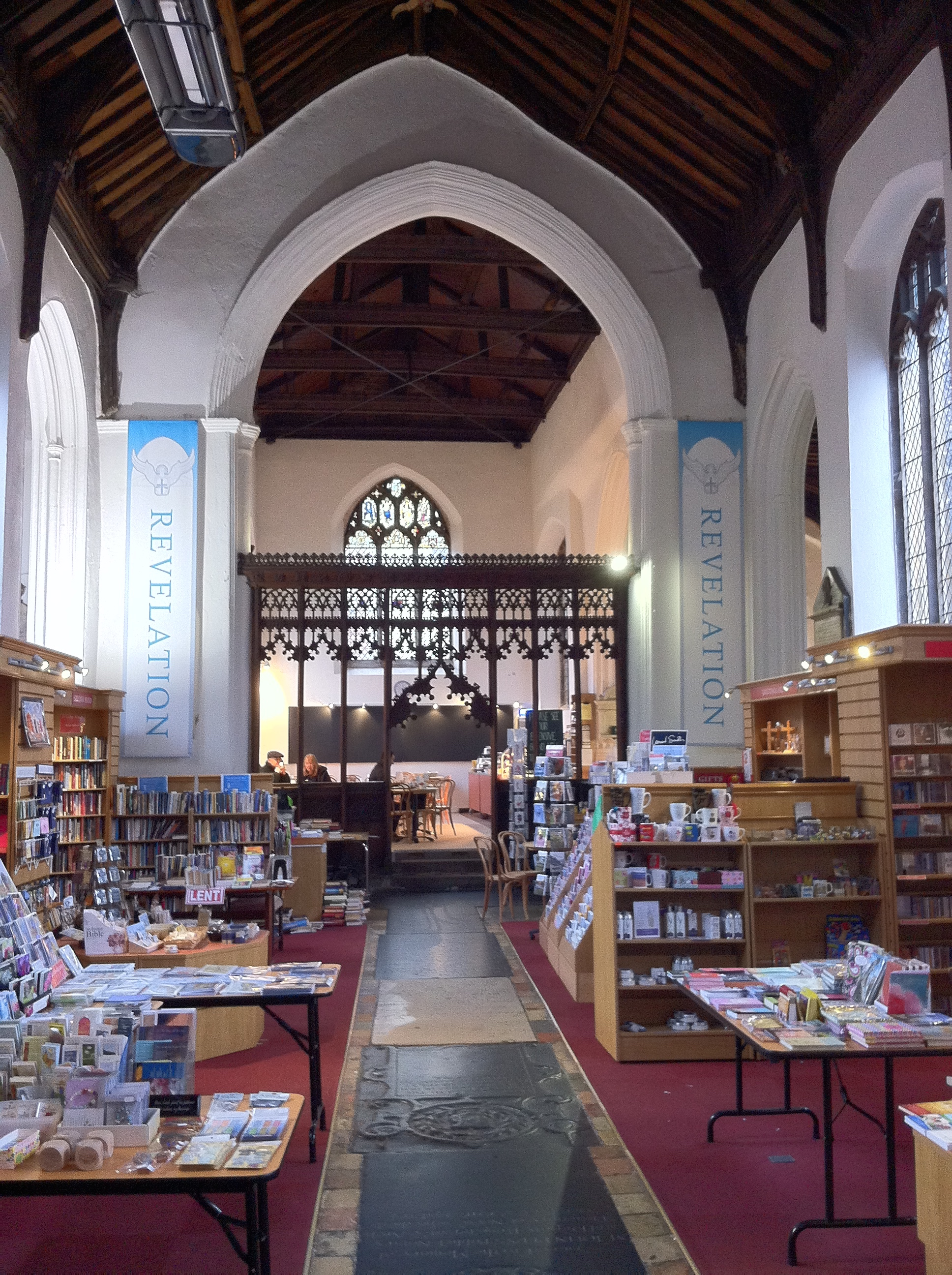
Interior of the church in 2015, when it was the Revelation Christian bookshop; the tearoom is visible in the chancel

In 1971, the church closed. It stood empty until it came under ownership of the Norwich Historic Churches Trust, allowing for its use as an antiques market with a café in its chancel. It became an Society for Promoting Christian Knowledge bookshop and café in 2004, and later became Revelation, an independent Christian bookshop with a tearoom.

In 2024, the owners of TipsyJar, a cocktail bar on Redwell Street in the city, applied for an outdoor drinking area on the former church's grounds. This was opposed by some locals. Separate plans to convert the church into a piano bar in 2025 faced similar opposition, though Norwich City Council granted this second application for an alcohol licence to John Taylor, who stated it would be "a conversational, slightly cultured place, all-seated with a grand piano." It was expected to host up to 130 people, and would be known as The Church, opening in 2026. In April that year, it won an appeal to the Planning Inspectorate that allowed it to stay open until 2am.

== Furnishings ==
=== Monuments ===
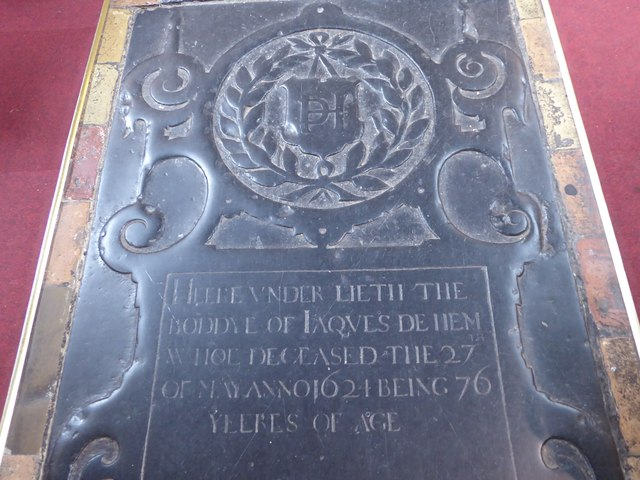
A memorial to Jaques de Hem (d. 1624)

There is a series of prominent burial monuments in the church to the De Hems, a prosperous Stranger family.

=== Panel paintings ===
Though surviving medieval panel paintings are rare in Norwich, there are three groups of these that came from St Michael at Plea. The first group, now of two panels though thought to be originally of five, depicts the Betrayal and the Crucifixion. These may be related to the Norwich Cathedral Retable, according to Pamela Tudor-Craig. The second group consists of a single panel depicting the Resurrection. It may have been a document of 1430s contact with Germany and the Low Countries. It may have either been part of an altar-piece or attached to a tomb. The third group has five panels, showing the Annunciation, the Crucifixion, a depiction of Saint Margaret, and two depictions of Episcopal Saints, possibly all belonging to a singular composite screen, painted around the same time. They were restored by John Brealey of the Pilgrim Trust in the mid-20th century. The panel depicting St Margaret, painted c. 1420–1430, is now usually held at Norwich Cathedral.
