= List of burials at Norwich Cathedral =

This is a partial list of people buried at Norwich Cathedral in Norwich, England. The Cathedral Church of the Holy and Undivided Trinity, Norwich is the cathedral church for the Church of England Diocese of Norwich and is one of the Norwich 12 heritage sites.

== List of people buried at Norwich Cathedral ==
This is a partial list of graves at Norwich Cathedral:

- Roger Bigod of Norfolk (died 1107)
- Herbert de Losinga, Bishop of Norwich (1095–1119)
- John de Gray, Bishop of Norwich (1200–1214)
- Pandulf Verraccio, Roman ecclesiastical politician, papal legate to England and Bishop of Norwich (1215–1226)
- John Salmon, Lord Chancellor of England and Bishop of Norwich (1299–1325)
- Thomas Erpingham (c. 1355–1428)
- Henry le Despenser, Bishop of Norwich (1370–1406)
- William Paston (died 1444) Justice of the Common Pleas
- Sir William Boleyn
- Anne Hoo, wife of Sir Geoffrey Boleyn.
- Richard Nykke, last Catholic (before the Henrician reform) Bishop of Norwich (1501–1535)
- John Hopton, Bishop of Norwich (1554–1558)
- John Salisbury, Dean of Norwich (1539–1554, 1559–1573)
- John Parkhurst, Bishop of Norwich (1560–1575)
- Osbert Parsley, Renaissance composer (1511–1585)
- William Redman, Bishop of Norwich (1595–1602)
- John Overall, Bishop of Norwich (1618–1619)
- Richard Montagu, Bishop of Norwich (1638–1641)
- Edward Reynolds, Bishop of Norwich (1660–1676)
- Edith Cavell, nurse, executed in the First World War (1865–1915)
