= Martial Rose =

Staff of Bretton Hall College (1922–2021)

Principal King Alfred's College
- In office 1967–1984
- Preceded by: John Stripe

Personal details
- Born: August 9, 1922 London, England
- Died: January 31, 2021 (aged 98) Norfolk, England
- Spouse: Heather Rose
- Children: Jenny Rose (Scholar); Christopher Rose
- Education: Christ's Hospital; Cambridge University

Martial Rose (9 August 1922 – 31 January 2021) was an English educator and historian.

== Early life and education ==
Rose was born in 1922. Raised in London, he attended elementary school in Camberwell, then gained a scholarship to attend Christ's Hospital, Horsham. After wartime service in London and in Swansea, he attended King's College, Cambridge from 1946 to 1950 where he received an MA.

== Career ==
Upon leaving King's College, he took up a post at Leyton County High School for Boys in London.

=== Bretton Hall College (1952–1965) ===
From 1952 to 1965, Martial Rose was a lecturer at Bretton Hall College of Education in Yorkshire. Initially appointed Head of English and Drama, he produced student and staff plays, operas and, in 1958, his own acting version of the Wakefield Mystery Plays. The production of the plays was considered by Rose, as well as other members of the college community, an enterprise that "was to unite the College in one massive undertaking." A later principal of Bretton Hall, Alyn Davies said of Rose's achievements: "This must be the single most significant act of scholarship at Bretton." After reading a review of his production in the Manchester Guardian, Bernard Miles wrote to Rose with the idea of opening his Mermaid Theatre with this version of the plays. Although, due to initial censorship by the Lord Chamberlain, Miles chose to open the theater with a production of Lock Up Your Daughters, he was able to mount productions of the Wakefield Mystery Plays in 1961 and 1963. In addition to providing the text of the plays, Rose served as a consultant for these productions.

In 1961, Martial Rose became Head of Education at Bretton Hall, as a Senior Tutor.

=== King Alfred's College (1965–1984) ===
In 1965, Rose took a post at King Alfred's College, Winchester. Although he was initially appointed Vice Principal, he took over as college head following the death of Principal John Stripe in 1967.

For nearly two decades he facilitated the growth in student numbers as well as physical facilities. Under the auspices of the Council for National Academic Awards, Rose helped King Alfred's reinvent itself from an institution dedicated to training teaching to a robust liberal arts college offering a diverse variety of programs and Bachelor's degrees. This move, under Rose's direction, helped the college to survive as well as to expand and to flourish, eventually becoming University of Winchester.

The Martial Rose Library of the college (now University of Winchester) bears his name.

=== Post retirement years (1984–2021) ===
After his retirement in 1984, Rose remained in close contact with many former students and colleagues. In addition to his numerous writing projects, he was involved in a research project of alumni of the University of Winchester aimed at assembling a collective portrait of the students of Winchester Training College (the former name of King Alfred's College) who served in the World War I.

== Publications ==
A specialist in English Literature and Drama, in 1961 Rose published the standard edition of the medieval cycle of the Wakefield Mystery Plays.

In 1970 he published a biography of E. M. Forster.

In 1981 he authored A History of King Alfred's College, Winchester 1840-1980. Arguably the figure himself in the making of what would become the University of Winchester, he was also concerned to set the record straight about its past and the different stages in the college's development.

In retirement in Norfolk, he wrote publications on the history of the town and parish of Dereham where he lived as well as notable people associated with the region, among them George Borrow, William Cowper, and Sir John Fenn, first editor of the Paston Letters. He also wrote books on the distinctive vault carvings and misericord of Norwich Cathedral and on the roof bosses in the chantry chapel of St Helen's Church in the Great Hospital, Norwich. Among these was Stories in Stone featuring the photographs of Julia Hedgecoe.

In 2003 he produced a biography of the actress Dame Gwen Ffrangcon-Davies, contemporary of John Gielgud, Edith Evans, and Laurence Olivier.

== Personal life and death ==
Martial Rose married Heather Millar in the summer of 1953, shortly after joining Bretton Hall College. They had two children.

He died after a short illness on 31 January 2021 at home in Norfolk.

== Selected works ==
- A Crowning Glory. The Vaulted Bosses in the Chantry Chapel of St Helen’s, the Great Hospital, Norwich. Dereham, 2006.
- The Parish Church of All Saints, Swanton Morley. Church Guide. Swanton Morley, 2005.
- Forever Juliet. The Life and Letters of Gwen Ffrangcon-Davies, 1891-1992. Dereham, 2003.
- The Parish Church of St Nicholas, East Dereham. Church Guide. Dereham, 2002.
- The Norwich Apocalypse. The Cycle of Vault Carvings in the Cloisters of Norwich Cathedral. Norwich, 1999.
- The Seven Sacrament Font in St Nicholas Church, East Dereham. Dereham, 1997.
- The Misericords of Norwich Cathedral. Dereham, 1994.
- King Alfred’s College, Winchester. A Decade of Change, 1980-1990. Winchester, 1990.
- The Rev Benjamin John Armstrong, Vicar of East Dereham, 1850-1888. Dereham, 1987.
- George Borrow. A Vignette. Dereham, 1987.
- A History of King Alfred’s College, Winchester, 1840-1980. Chichester, 1981.
- The Development of Drama in Higher Education. Winchester, 1979.
- E.M. Forster. London, 1970.
- Stories in Stone. The Medieval Roof Carvings of Norwich Cathedral. Norwich, 1970.
- The Wakefield Mystery Plays. Norton, 1969.
- William Cowper. A Vignette. Dereham, nd.
- Sir John Fenn of East Dereham. The First Editor of the Paston Letters. Dereham, nd.
