= Julia Hedgecoe =

Photographer (born 1938)

- Born: Julia Mardon; 1938 (age 87–88); Bishops Stortford
- Education: Guildford School of Art
- Awards: Fellow Commoner, Clare Hall, Cambridge University

Julia Hedgecoe is a photographer known for her portraiture and architectural images. Her work also includes images of interiors, food and Spanish landscapes.

== Biography ==
Julia Mardon was born in 1938 in Bishop's Stortford. In 1959 she married John Hedgecoe (d. 2010), who was a professional photographer. They had three children, the eldest of which, Sebastian Hedgecoe, followed in his parents footsteps and is also a photographer.

== Working life ==
Julia Mardon (hereinafter Hedgecoe) trained at the Guildford School of Art where the head of the photography department was Ifor Thomas whose students included Jane Bown and John Hedgecoe.

After graduating Hedgecoe worked at The Observer. This was followed by freelance work for The Daily Telegraph and other print publications.

In the 1980s Hedgecoe undertook a commission to photograph outstanding women graduates from the University of Cambridge. Originally published as a book 'Educating Eve: Five Generations of Cambridge Women, edited by Mary T. Broers, Hedgecoe's photographs became the subject of an exhibition of the same name at the National Portrait Gallery, London, in 1999. In all fifty subjects were displayed including Eleanor Bron, Diane Abbott, Rabbi Julia Neuberger and Dr. Penelope Leach. Twenty portraits remain in the Gallery's collection.

Hedgecoe is a Fellow Commoner of Clare Hall, University of Cambridge where she is described as, "Photographer, illustrator of books and portrait photographer to a number of the University of Cambridge Colleges."

Hedgecoe currently works from her studio in Cambridge and for some of the year from her house in southern Spain.

=== Published works ===
The book 'Stories in Stone', written by Martial Rose, features her images of the roof carvings in Norwich Cathedral. Later in 2005 a CD was released which formed part of an interactive presentation at the Cathedral. This CD was reviewed in Studies in Iconography.

In 'The Patchworks of Lucy Boston' Hedgecoe is credited with "(illustrating the patchworks with) beautiful photography to capture Lucy's incredible body of work."

Hedgecoe provided the images that appear in 'In Good Company: A Snapshot of the Theatre and the Arts'. The book contains a Foreword by Sir Donald Sinden.

Photographs attributed to Hedgecoe appear in the Conway Library collection at the Courtauld Institute of Art, London.
