= Despenser Reredos =

Medieval altarpiece in Norwich Cathedral

- Despenser Retable
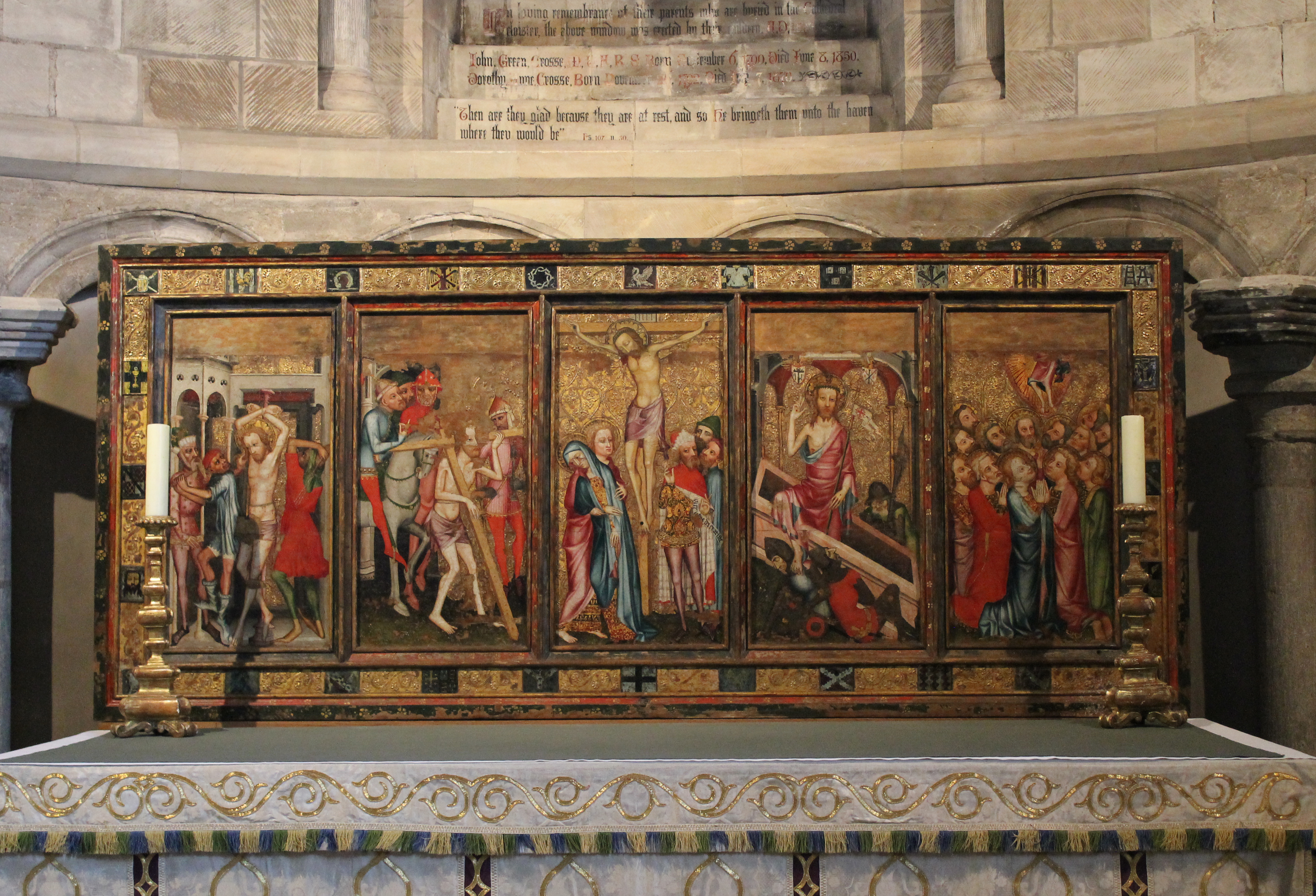
- The reredos in St Luke's Chapel, Norwich Cathedral
- Year: 1382 (Julian)
- Medium: gold leaf, glass, wood, paint
- Subject: Passion of Jesus, crucifixion of Jesus, Ascension of Jesus
- Dimensions: 87.63 cm (34.50 in) × 260.35 cm (102.50 in)
- Location: United Kingdom
- Coordinates: 52°37′55″N 1°18′04″E

The Despenser Reredos or Despenser Retable is a medieval altarpiece now in St Luke's Chapel, Norwich Cathedral. It is the cathedral's most important work of art. The altarpiece shows five scenes from the end of Christ's life—his flagellation, his journey to the cross, his crucifixion, events that follow his burial, and the Ascension. The scenes, which are painted on wood in vivid colours, are surrounded by a rectangular frame. The original reredos may originally have been positioned at the cathedral's high altar.

The reredos is generally considered to have been commissioned by the Bishop of Norwich, Henry le Despenser, following the defeat of a rebel peasant army at the Battle of North Walsham in 1381. Alternative theories have been suggested for the reason for its commission, including that it was made to mark the visit to the city by Richard II of England in 1383, or as thanksgiving for the completion of work done in the cathedral. Heraldic shields around the frame may represent the families who were involved in suppressing the Peasants' Revolt in East Anglia, or who contributed to the cost of producing the piece. A number of family names for the shields, first suggested at the end of the 19th century, have since been reinterpreted by researchers.

The reredos remained lost until 1847, when it was accidentally rediscovered in the cathedral, having been remade into a table, with the paintings concealed underneath. The upper part of the reredos (which included part of the central figure of Jesus) had been sawn off by carpenters when constructing the table top. The panels and frame were restored by Pauline Plummer in the 1950s, since when the reredos has been used once more as an altarpiece.

== Discovery and provenance ==
The Despenser Reredos is a medieval altarpiece used in St Luke's Chapel in Norwich Cathedral, which has been used as a parish church since the 16th century. The reredos was discovered in the cathedral in 1847, having been converted into a table during the English Reformation, and kept for years in an upper room, with the altarpiece paintings hidden underneath. The reredos had been sawn off at the top and the four corners had been cut out to enable table legs to be inserted. (Note: The art historian Sarah Stanbury has described the history of the artefact as "a story of creative reuse" that has been valued in different ways during its lifetime—"First an important devotional object, a statement of wealth and orthodox pieties; next a table in an annex; and then a masterpiece of East Anglian art.")

The preservation of this work of art is wholly due to the fortuitous circumstance that the well-compacted piece of joiner's work, whereon the painter so elaborately displayed his skill, had happily been found suitable to form a large table for one of the subordinate chambers or vestries, adjoining the choir of the cathedral. It had, accordingly, on the removal of all superstitious imageries, been cut to adapt it to the desired purpose; the painted side being reversed, and by that means rescued from further injury. It had thus remained long time wholly forgotten, whilst the back of the picture served conveniently as the top of the required table.

— Albert Way, "Observations on a painting of the XIVth century, part of the decorations of an altar: discovered in Norwich Cathedral", Memoirs illustrative of the history and antiquities of Norfolk and the city of Norwich (1851)

Way's account of the painting did not disclose details about how the artefact was discovered in the chapel room, what the table was being used for when it was found, or its original use in the cathedral. Following the discovery of the reredos, it was displayed in a glass case in the cathedral's south ambulatory.

Following its discovery in 1847, Albert Way (a local historian who published his findings in a special edition of The History and Antiquities of Norfolk and the City of Norwich), and his colleague, the art historian Matthew Digby Wyatt, both interpreted the altarpiece as having come from Italy. However, the origin of the reredos remains uncertain. It was at first considered by experts to be of Italian or German origin, but later specialists believed it to be influenced by French or Bohemian craftsmen—Hope's 1897 account stated that the retable was an example of “genuine English art”, and that it had been made in Norwich.

The panels are similar to others at another church, St Michael-at-Plea, Norwich, but experts have not been able to conclude from this that it was made locally. Historian David King has concluded that the origin of the reredos cannot be ascertained by the style of the panels. In contrast, the medieval art historian Pamela Tudor-Craig wrote that there is evidence that the reredos was "executed by local craftsmen".

== Commission ==
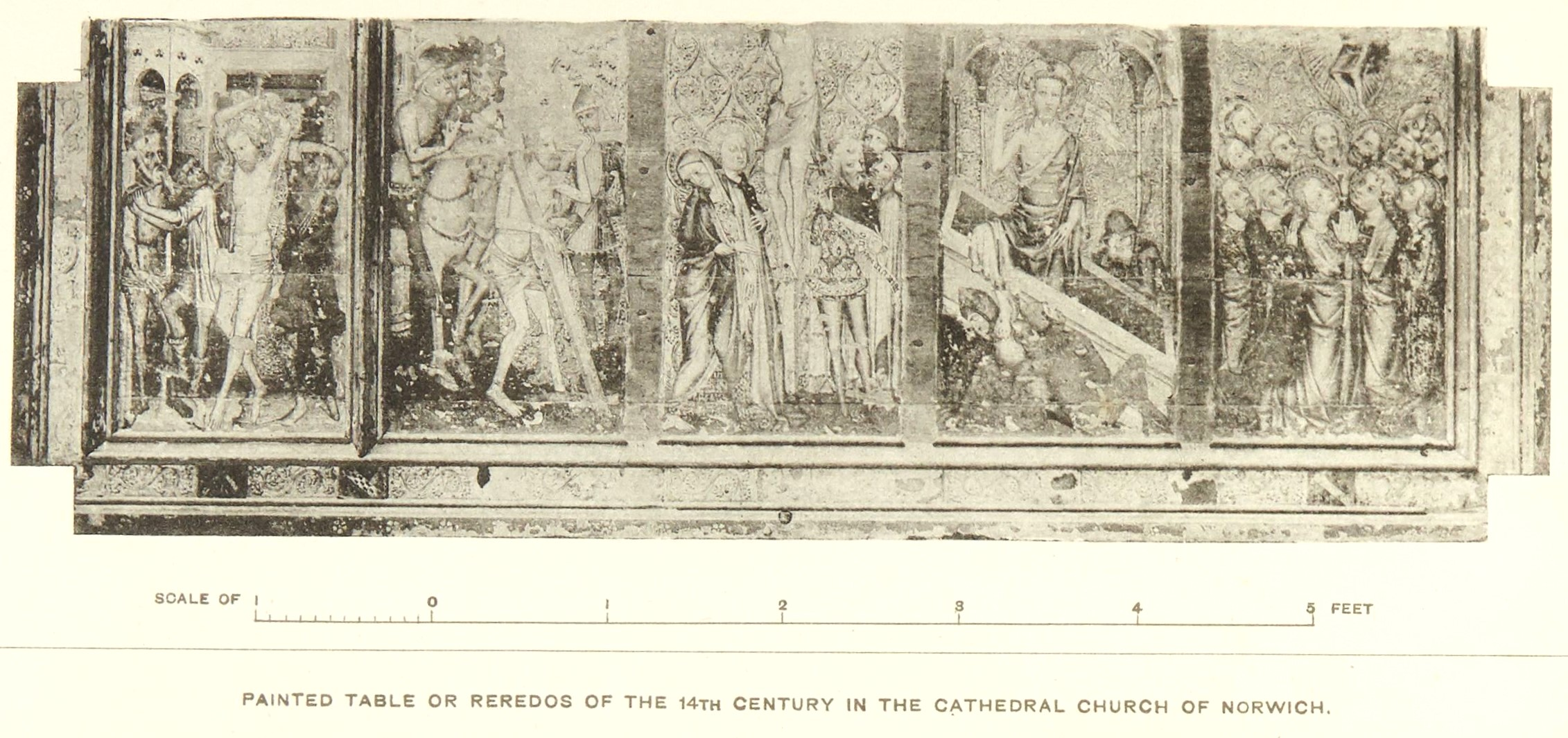
William Henry St John Hope's original photograph of the reredos (1898)

The date the reredos was made, the reason for its commission, and its provenance, are not known for certain. It has been suggested from the existence of heraldic shields around the borders of the reredos that it was made as an act of thanksgiving following events in Norfolk during the Peasants' Revolt of 1381, a conjecture first made by the English antiquarian William Henry St John Hope in 1898. Hope examined the surviving heraldry on the reredos, and suggested family names for seven of the shields. His analysis of the shields has since been reinterpreted by modern researchers; their findings may actually connect the reredos with the Peasants’ Revolt even more closely. Hope identified “clear traces” of the Despenser family arms on the frame, but his photograph of 1898 does not show it. His suggestion that the arms of Stephen Hales, who was captured by the rebels, is included on the reredos, is probably correct. According to Hope, the shields would have represented local families who had wanted to thank God for the defeat of the rebels at the Battle of North Walsham in June that year, most notably Henry le Despenser, who led the forces against them. It is possible that the reredos was commissioned by Despenser, an English nobleman and the Bishop of Norwich at the time of the Peasants' Revolt, as suggested by Hope, but the 1898 photograph lacks any evidence that Despenser's arms were ever represented on the reredos frame. (Note: Destined for a career in the church from a young age, Despenser spent much of his earlier life at the Papal curia in the service of Pope Urban V. He fought in the papal armies against the city state of Milan during the crusade against the Visconti.)

The medievalist Sarah Beckwith has argued that the commission was directly related to the insurrection in the manner of an object lesson, suggesting that "the peasants who had dared, albeit abortively, to contest their ordained position in the social hierarchy and whose revolutionary gestures were based on an identification with Christ, are once again shown a story, a story they already know very well".

However, a link with the revolt cannot be proven, and the heraldic shields may have been belonged to important Norfolk families who were represented because of a different association. The reredos could have been commissioned by Norwich Cathedral to mark the visit to the city by Richard II of England and his queen Anne of Bohemia in 1383. The reredos may have been dedicated in the presence of Richard, a possibility that is more likely if it was intended to be used for the cathedral's high altar. According to Tudor-Craig, the purpose of the heraldry on the reredos was to commemorate "not only those who contributed to the altarpiece itself, but those who had helped fund the reconstruction of the eastern arms of the church".

There is no evidence from the cathedral's sacrist rolls for the period—or from any other sources—to suggest who paid for the reredos. The historian David King considers that “a collective donation by those represented in the heraldry” is the most like means by which the costs of the artefact were met.

== Description ==
=== Construction of the frame ===
The reredos is the cathedral's most important work of art. It is located behind the altar in St Luke’s Chapel. The painted scenes are on a wooden panel made from at least four planks, over which a frame was attached. The five scenes were separated by mullions, of which only one survives. Dowels were used to join the pieces. At least one of the upper planks is missing, as the top of the reredos was sawn off to make a rectangular bench top, and 10 centimetres (3.9 in) squares of wood were removed from the reredos to allow for the construction of legs at the four corners.

The original shape of the frame cannot be determined, but it was probably rectangular. The frame may have had 30 heraldic shields, as well as some of the Instruments of the Passion. Only those around the sides and along the bottom of the frame survived when the reredos was converted into a bench.

=== Painted panels ===
The five sections of the reredos are each devoted to one aspect of Christ's final days. The colours used are vivid, and include a bright red and a blueish green. The paintings were never deliberately damaged, but paint has been lost from them over the centuries. The loss of the top part from three of the panels only resulted in the removal of the architectural settings. The upper part of Christ has been lost in two of the panels. The missing part of the central panel has been reinstated by Pauline Plummer (unlike the others, where the missing art has not been restored), so that the reredos can be used in religious services.

The first panel shows an almost totally naked Christ being whipped whilst being tied to a pillar. Jesus is looking at his persecutors with sadness rather than in pain. The Roman soldiers are made to look ugly as they grimace and dance, a sign that they are evil. The men scourging Jesus are shown as labouring peasants—with sunburnt skin, rustic clothes, and bare legs—whilst Jesus himself is almost naked and depicted with a pale-looking skin. A bearded authority figure that may represent Pilate is shown in this panel. The second panel shows Christ surrounded by soldiers as he is made to carry his cross. The central panel depicts the crucifixion of Christ. The panel shows Mary, mother of Jesus, being held by St John the Evangelist. A group of three men opposite to them includes a person who may be the same authority figure shown in the scourging scene. A quotation from the Bible reads vere filius dei erat iste (“This man was truly the Son of God”). The fourth panel shows events that follow the Burial of Jesus. He is shown carrying a banner and stepping onto the shoulder of a sleeping soldier as he rises from his tomb. Unlike the drawing of Jesus, the tomb has no perspective. The fifth panel shows the Ascension of Jesus, with the Disciples and the Virgin Mary arranged around him. Much of the figure of Jesus is lost, a result of the top of the panel being cut away when the reredos was made into a table top. It is unclear how much of Jesus was originally depicted in this panel.

In the reredos, Christ is shown as humbly accepting his fate from those with the power to prescribe it; a similar position, says Beckwith, to the position the peasantry found themselves in following their abortive rebellion.

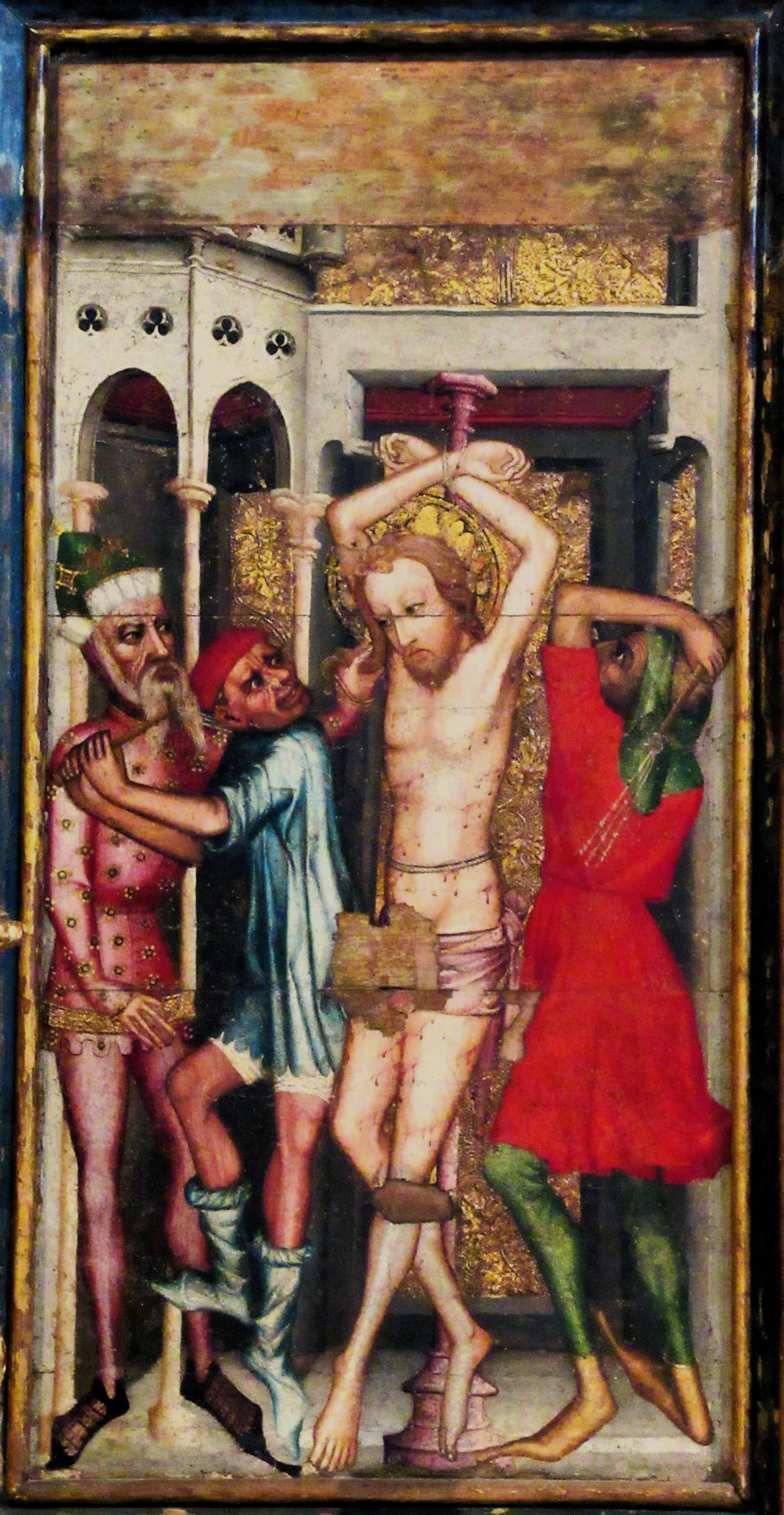
First panel—the Flagellation of Christ

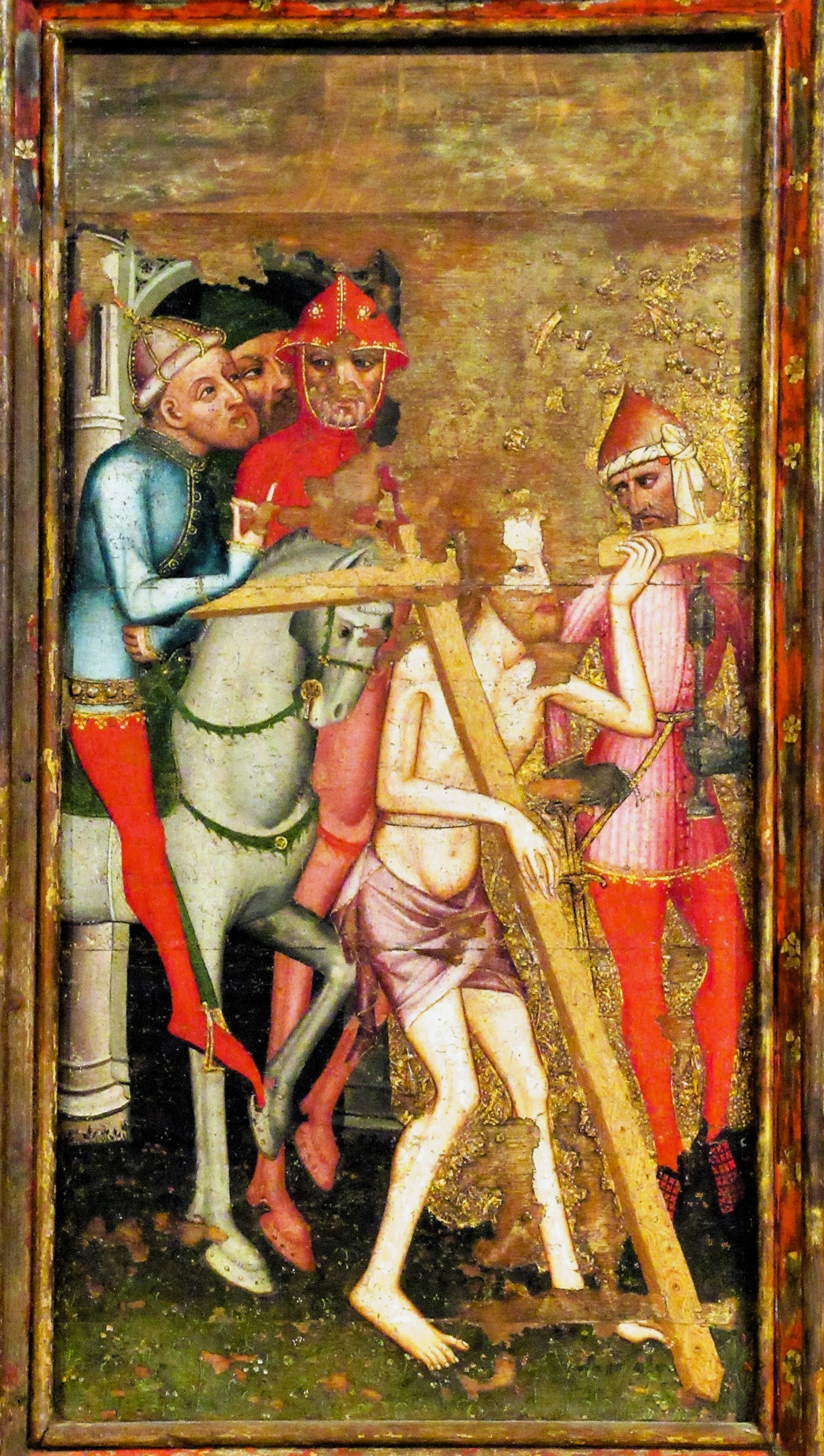
Second panel—Christ carrying the cross

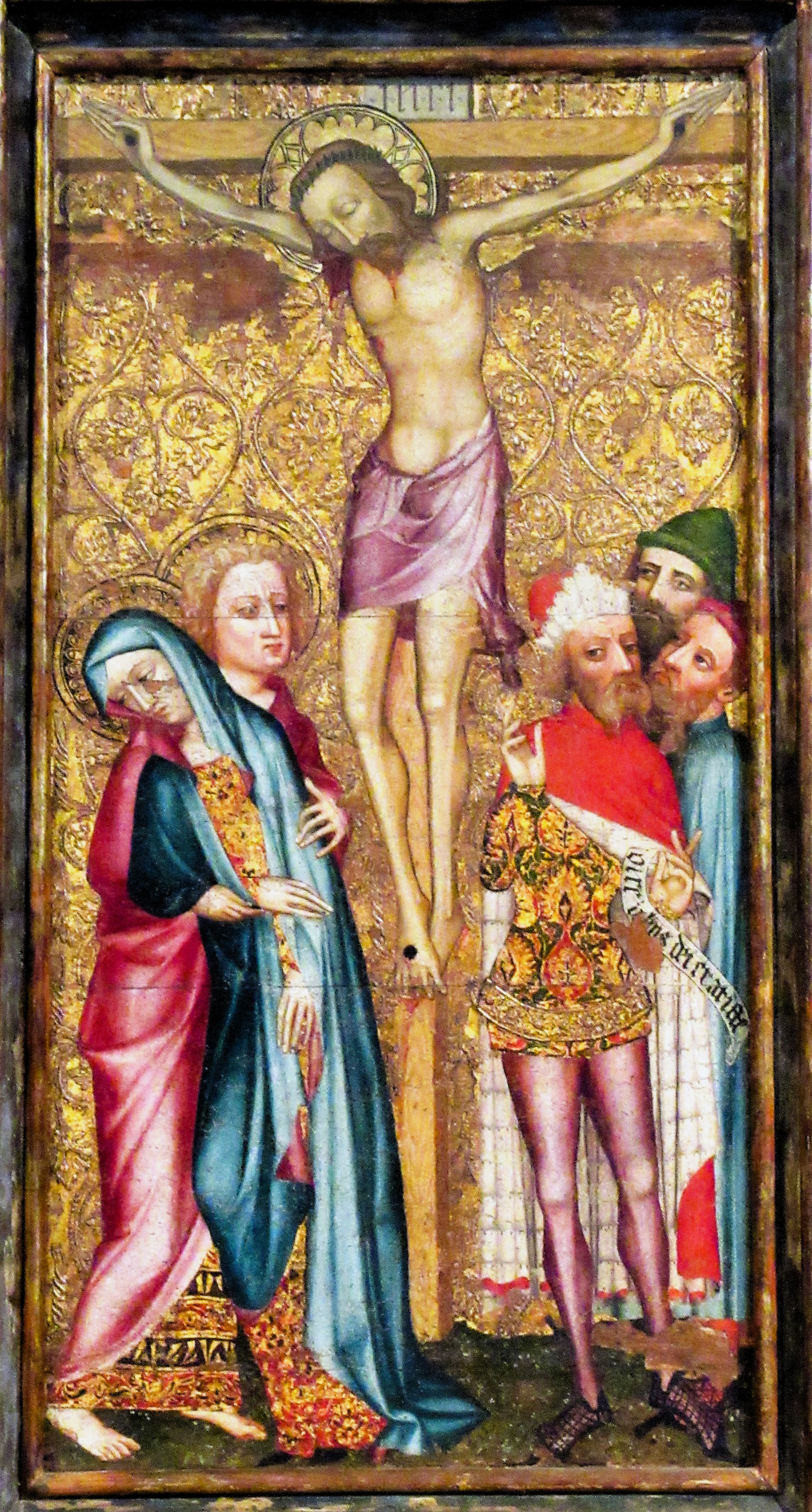
Central panel—the Crucifixion of Jesus

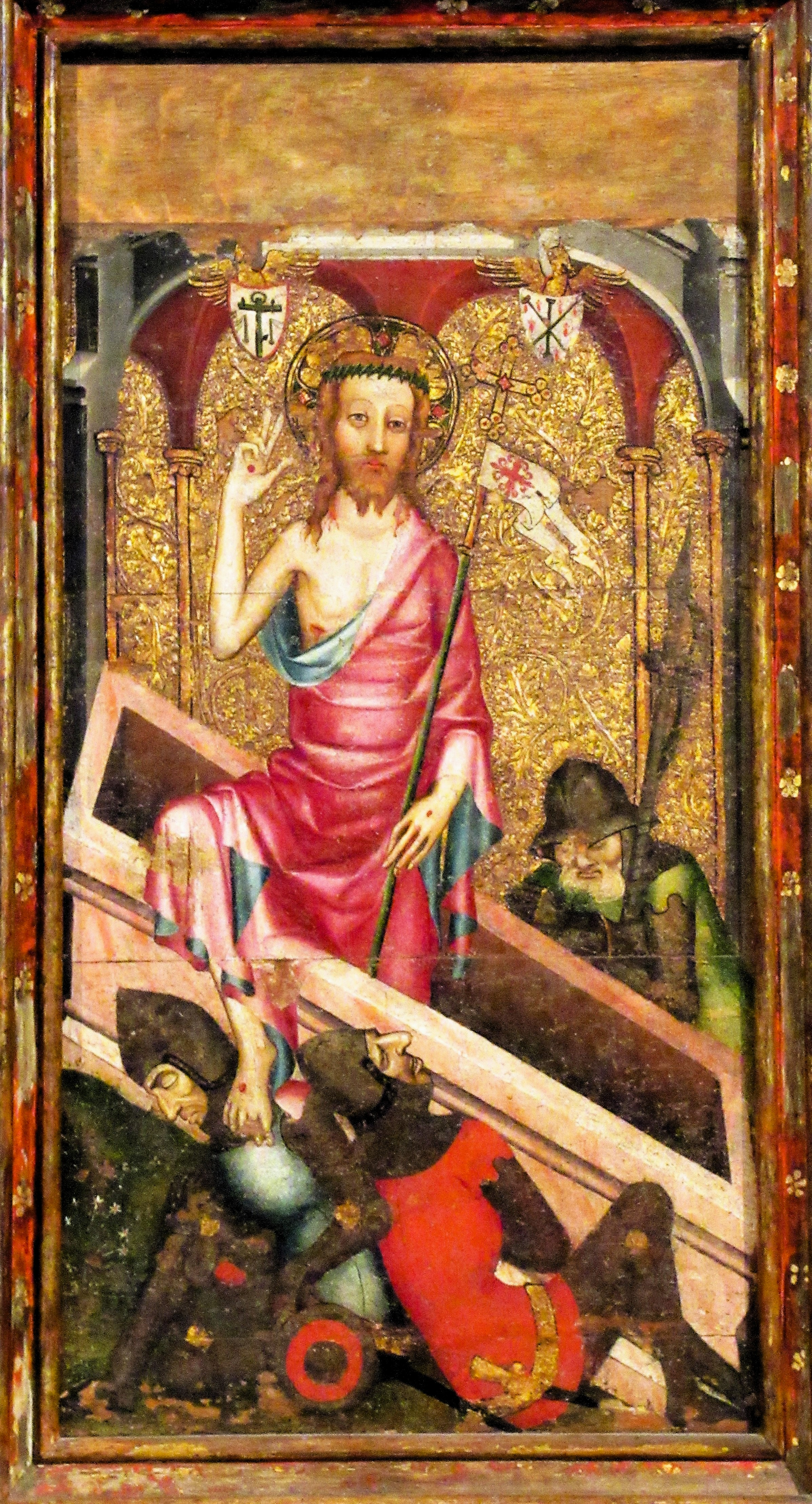
Fourth panel—the Resurrection of Jesus

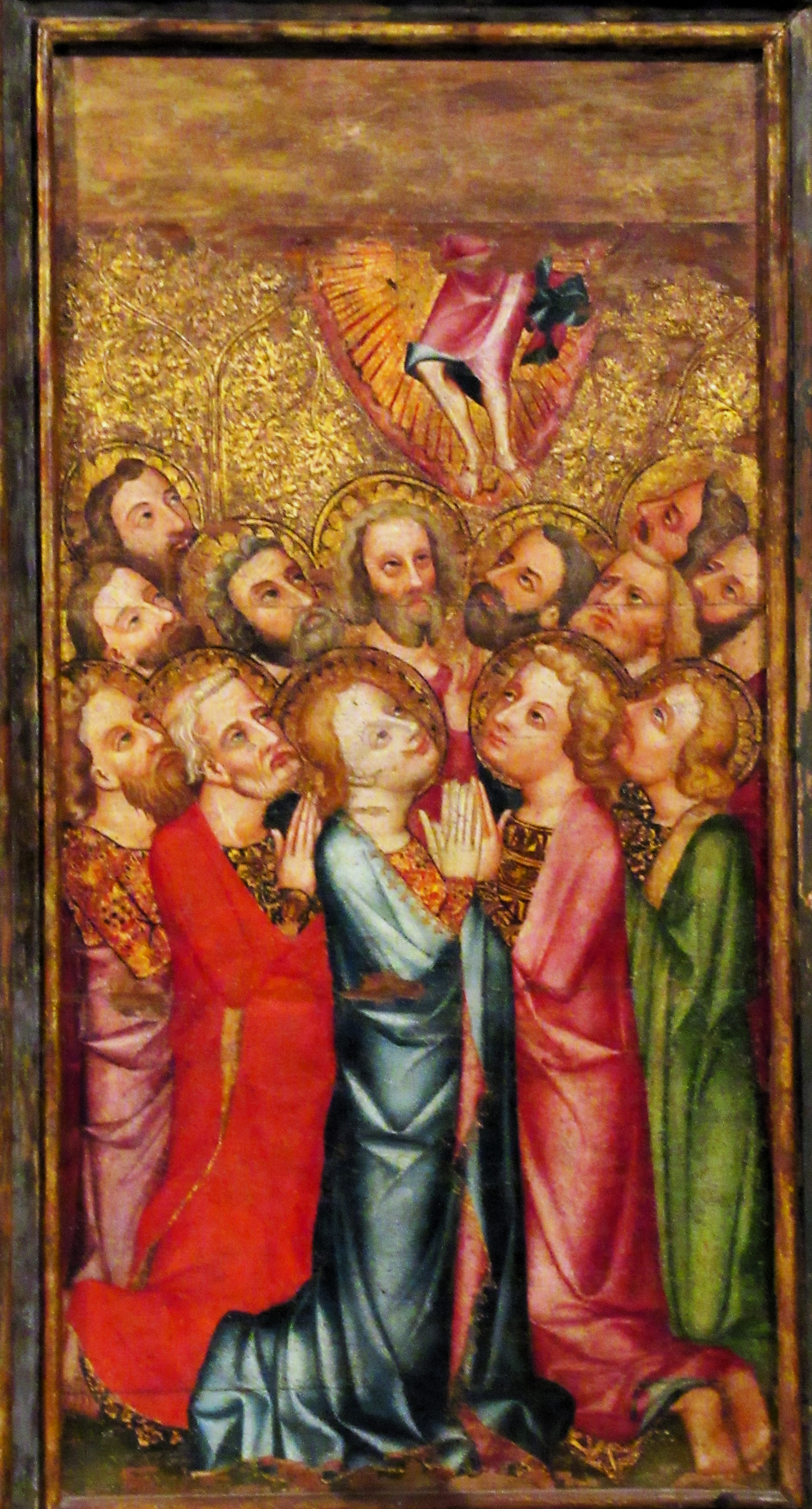
Fifth panel—the Ascension of Jesus

== Sources ==
- Beckwith, Sarah (1993). Christ's Body: Identity, Culture and Society in Late Medieval Writings (PDF). London: Routledge. ISBN 978-1-13476-157-9.
- Davies, R. G. (2004). "Despenser, Henry (d. 1406)". Oxford Dictionary of National Biography (online ed.). Oxford: Oxford University Press. doi:10.1093/ref:odnb/7551. Archived from the original on 2 November 2019. (Subscription, Wikipedia Library access or UK public library membership required.)
- King, David. J. (1996). "The Panel Paintings and Stained Glass". In Atherton, Ian; Fernie, Eric; Harper-Bill, Christopher; Smith, Hassell (eds.). Norwich Cathedral: Church, City and Diocese, 1096–1996. London: The Hambleton Press. ISBN 978-1-85285-134-7.
- McFayden, Phillip (2015). Norwich Cathedral Despenser Retable: An Illustrated Guide to the Medieval Altarpiece in Norwich Cathedral. Medieval Media. ISBN 978-09926-3-882-5.
- Way, Albert (1851). "Observations of a Painting of the IVth century, part of the decorations of an altar discovered in Norwich Cathedral". Memoirs Illustrative of the History and Antiquities of Norfolk and the City of Norwich. 3. Royal Archaeological Institute of Great Britain and Ireland: 198–206.
- Plummer, Pauline (1959). "Restoration of a Retable in Norwich Cathedral". Studies in Conservation. 4 (3): 106–115. doi:10.2307/1505071. JSTOR 1505071.
- Stanbury, Sarah (2015). "The Despenser Retable and 1381". The Visual Object of Desire in Late Medieval England. Philadelphia, Pennsylvania: University of Pennsylvania Press. pp. 76–94. ISBN 978-15128-0-829-2.
- Sumption, J. (2009). The Hundred Years' War: Divided Houses. Vol. 3. London: Faber & Faber. ISBN 978-0571240128.
- Tink, Daniel (2010). Spirit of Norwich Cathedral. Wellington: Pixz. ISBN 9780857100276. OCLC 1280737875.
