= Norwich Cathedral =

Cathedral in England

Coordinates: 52°37′55″N 01°18′04″E

- Cathedral Church of the Holy and Undivided Trinity
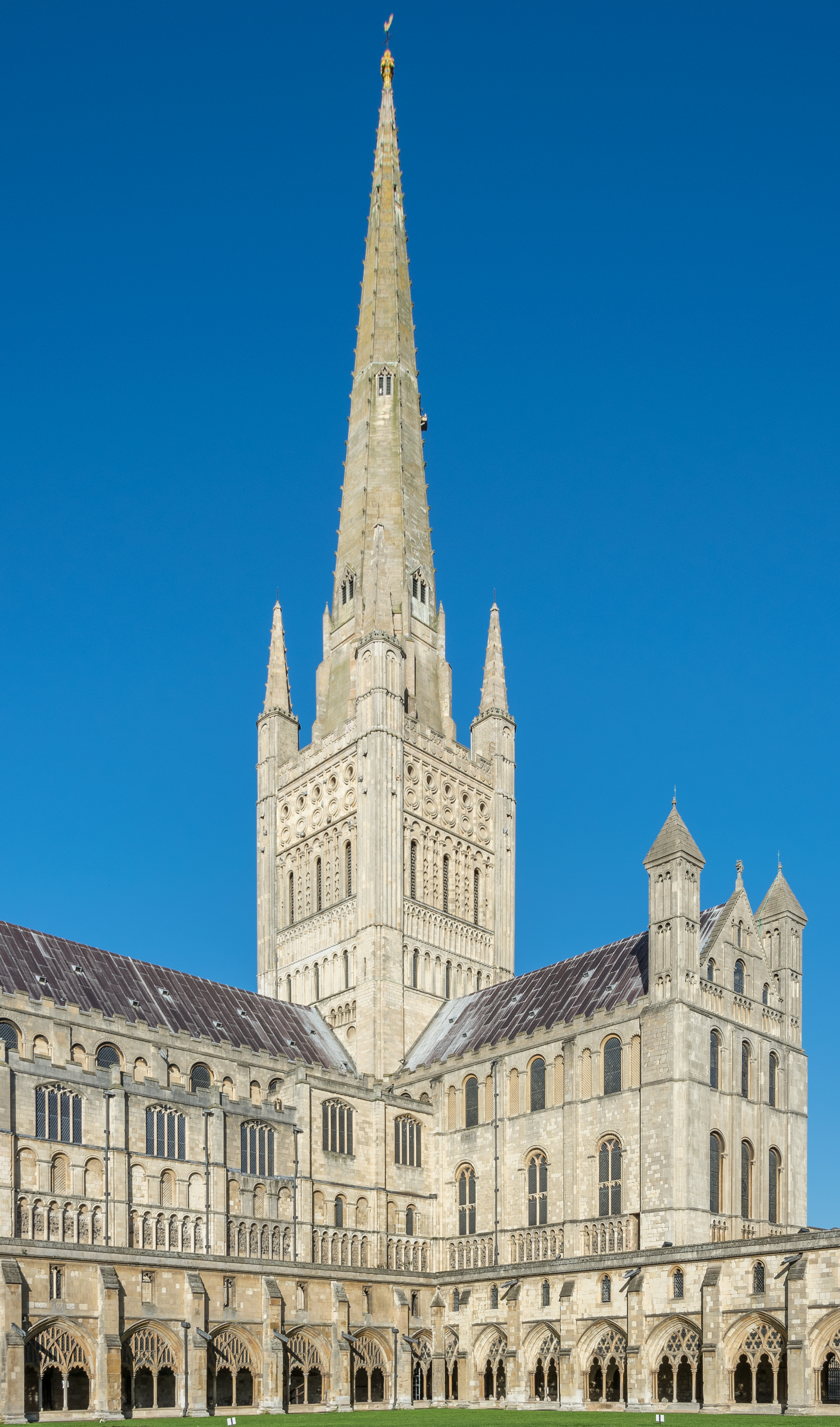
- Spire and south transept of Norwich Cathedral viewed from the cloister
- Norwich Cathedral
- OS grid reference: TG 23476 08911
- Location: Norwich, Norfolk
- Country: England
- Denomination: Church of England
- Previous denomination: Roman Catholic
- Website: www.cathedral.org.uk

History
- Consecrated: 24 September 1101 (reconsecrated 1278)

Architecture
- Style: Norman, Gothic
- Years built: 1096–(1121–1145)

Specifications
- Length: 124 m (407 ft)
- Width: 54.9 m (180 ft)

Administration
- Province: Canterbury
- Diocese: Norwich

Clergy
- Bishop: Graham Usher
- Dean: Andrew Braddock

Listed Building – Grade I
- Official name: The Cathedral of the Holy and Undivided Trinity
- Designated: 26 February 1954
- Reference no.: 1051330

Norwich Cathedral, formally the Cathedral Church of the Holy and Undivided Trinity, is a Church of England cathedral in the city of Norwich, Norfolk, England. The cathedral is the seat of the bishop of Norwich and the mother church of the diocese of Norwich. It is administered by its dean and chapter, and there are daily Church of England services. It is a Grade I listed building.

Construction of the building was begun in 1096 at the behest of the first bishop of Norwich, Herbert de Losinga. The crossing tower was the last piece of the Norman cathedral to be completed. At that time, measuring 461 ft (141 m) long and 177 ft (54 m) wide, the cathedral was the largest building in East Anglia. The cathedral close occupied a tenth of the total area of the medieval city.

The present structure of Norwich Cathedral is primarily Norman, being made of flint and mortar and faced with a cream-coloured Caen limestone. The cathedral was damaged by rioters in 1272; repairs were completed in 1278. The cloisters, begun in 1297, are the fourth largest cloisters in England. The present spire—the second tallest in England at 315 ft (96 m)—is a stone structure built in 1480 that replaced one made of wood. In about 1830, the south transept was remodelled by the architect Anthony Salvin. A new hospitality and education facility by Hopkins Architects was opened by Elizabeth II and the Duke of Edinburgh in 2010.

Norwich Cathedral once had the earliest astronomical clock in England. The cathedral's bosses are one of the world's greatest mediaeval sculptural treasures, having survived the iconoclasm of the Tudor and English Civil War periods.

== History ==
=== Early years ===
In the year 672, the Archbishop of Canterbury, Theodore of Tarsus, divided the Kingdom of East Anglia into two dioceses: one covering Norfolk with its episcopal see at Elmham; the other covering Suffolk with its see at Dunwich. During much of the 9th century, because of the Danish incursions, there was no bishop at Elmham; in addition the see of Dunwich was extinguished and East Anglia became a single diocese once more. Following the Norman Conquest, sees were moved to more secure urban centres, that of Elmham being transferred to Thetford in 1072, and finally to Norwich in 1094.

=== Seat of the bishop ===
Building of the new cathedral was begun in 1096 by Herbert de Losinga, Norwich's first bishop. It was dedicated to the Holy and Undivided Trinity. As with the Norman cathedrals at Bath, Winchester, Worcester, Canterbury, Rochester, Durham, and Ely, it incorporated a priory of Benedictine monks.

=== Building programme ===
The structure of the cathedral is primarily in the Norman style, having been constructed at the behest of the first bishop of Norwich, Herbert de Losinga, who had bought the bishopric for £1,900 before its transfer from Thetford. It still retains the greater part of its original stone structure. An Anglo-Saxon settlement and two churches were demolished to make room for the buildings and a canal cut to allow access for the boats bringing the stone and building materials which were taken up the River Wensum and unloaded.

=== Later Medieval period ===
The cathedral was damaged after riots in 1272, which resulted in the city paying heavy fines levied by Henry III, king of England The cathedral was re-consecrated in the presence of Edward I of England on Advent Sunday, in 1278.

The first spire of wood covered in lead was completed in 1297 but was blown down during a storm in 1362, its fall damaging the east end of the building. In 1463 the 2nd spire was struck by lightning, in flames it collapsed through the nave roof causing a fire so intense it turned some of the cream-coloured Caen limestone a pink colour. In 1480 the bishop, James Goldwell, ordered the building of a new spire encased in stone and finished in 1485 which is still in place today.

=== 16th and 17th centuries ===
The composer and 'singing man' Osbert Parsley worked at Norwich Cathedral for 50 years, until his death in 1585. The cathedral was partially in ruins when John Cosin was at Norwich School in the early 17th century and the former bishop was an absentee figure. In 1643 during the Civil War, an angry Puritan mob invaded the cathedral and destroyed all Roman Catholic symbols. The building, abandoned the following year, lay in ruins for two decades. Norwich bishop Joseph Hall provides a graphic description from his book Hard Measure:

It is tragical to relate the furious sacrilege committed under the authority of Linsey, Tofts the sheriff, and Greenwood: what clattering of glasses, what beating down of walls, what tearing down of monuments, what pulling down of seats, and wresting out of irons and brass from the windows and graves; what defacing of arms, what demolishing of curious stone-work, that had not any representation in the world but of the cost of the founder and skill of the mason; what piping on the destroyed organ-pipes; vestments, both copes and surplices, together with the leaden cross which had been newly sawed down from over the greenyard pulpit, and the singing-books and service-books, were carried to the fire in the public market-place; a lewd wretch walking before the train in his cope trailing in the dirt, with a service-book in his hand, imitating in an impious scorn the tune, and usurping the words of the litany. The ordnance being discharged on the guild-day, the cathedral was filled with musketeers, drinking and tobacconing as freely as if it had turned ale-house.

The mob also fired their muskets. At least one musket ball remains lodged in the stonework. Only at the Restoration in 1660 would the cathedral be restored.

=== 19th and 20th centuries ===
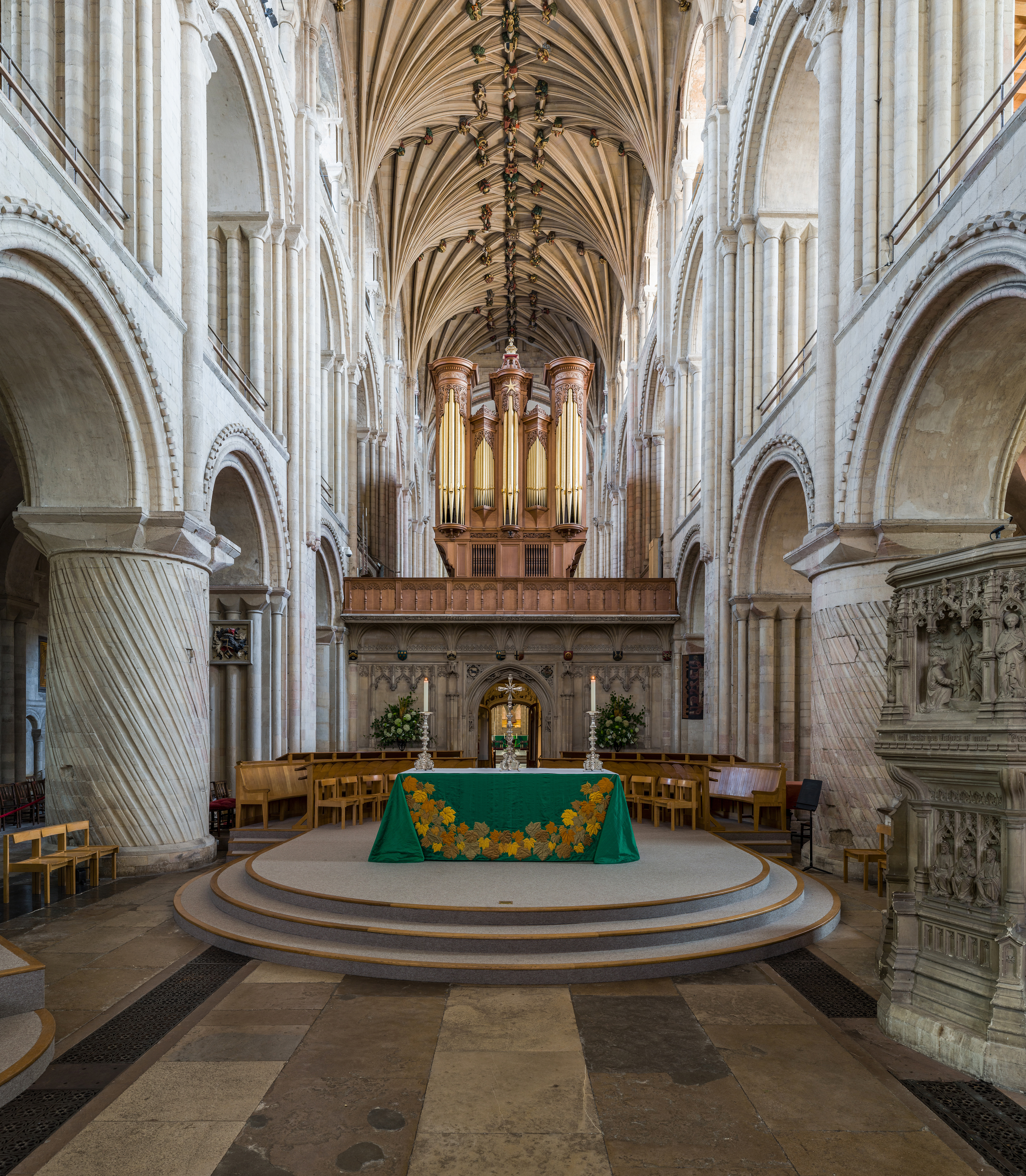
The pulpitum

In the 1830s the south transept was remodelled by the English architect Anthony Salvin. In 1930–1932 a new Lady Chapel, designed by Charles Nicholson, was built at the east end, on the site of its 13th-century predecessor, which had been demolished during the late 16th century.

The cathedral is included as one of the "Norwich 12", a list of the city's most iconic buildings produced as part of an initiative launched in 2008 by the Norwich Heritage Economic and Regeneration Trust.

=== Modern works ===
In 2004 the new refectory (winner, National Wood Awards 2004), by Hopkins Architects and Buro Happold, opened on the site of the original refectory on the south side of the cloisters. Work on the new hostry, also by Hopkins Architects, started in April 2007 after the 'Cathedral Inspiration for the Future Campaign' had reached its target of £10 million. It was opened by Queen Elizabeth II and Prince Philip, Duke of Edinburgh on 4 May 2010. The new hostry has become the main entrance to the cathedral. Space has been provided within the hostry for temporary art exhibitions.

==== Helter-skelter ====
In July 2019, a 17 m (56 ft) high helter-skelter was constructed inside the cathedral, partly for the purpose of attracting more visitors and also giving people a better vantage point for viewing the roof bosses. Reaction to the installation of the slide was mixed, Gavin Ashenden, former chaplain to the Queen, described it as "poisoning the medicine" a church offered. In August 2019, Jonathan Meyrick, the Bishop of Lynn, gave a sermon and sang Words by the Bee Gees from halfway down.

== Ministry ==
Norwich Cathedral has been the seat of the Bishop of Norwich since 1094. The governing chapter is made up of the dean, the Canon Precentor, the Canon Librarian & Vice-Dean, the Canon for Mission & Pastoral Care, and six lay members. The current bishop is Graham Usher, who was installed in the cathedral in 2019. The current Dean of Norwich is Andrew Braddock, who was installed at the cathedral on 28 January 2023.

Other staff include the organist and master of music and his assistant, the Liturgy and Music Administrator, the librarian and curator, the Retail Manager, the Sacrist, the Broderers' Guild Workshop Supervisor, and the Secretary to the Friends of Norwich Cathedral.

== Architecture ==
=== Dates, styles and architects ===
Plan of Norwich Cathedral: (Note: Adapted from a plan by R. Rorfe): 1. West front; 2. Nave; 3. Choir; 4. Central tower; 5. Chancel; 6. North Aisle; 7. South Aisle; 8. North Transept; 9. South Transept; 10. Cloister

Building of the cathedral started from the east end in 1096, with the nave being completed by around 1120. The entire cathedral was completed by 1145, when the crossing tower was built. The cathedral is constructed using limestone sourced from Lincolnshire, Barnack and Caen, flint, and mortar. The present spire, a stone structure that replaced one made of wood and covered with lead, was added in 1480.

Following the riots of 1272, repairs to the building were completed in 1278. Some of the windows were replaced with ones in the Gothic style during the 13th century.

The cloisters was begun in 1297 and finally finished in 1430 after the Black Death had plagued the city. The system of building remained the same over this period, though the details, in particular the tracery of the openings facing the cloister garth, did change. Following the destruction caused by the collapse of the spire, the clerestory of the choir was rebuilt in the Perpendicular style.

In the 15th century, the cathedral's flat timber ceilings began to be replaced with stone vaults; the nave was vaulted under Walter Hart (bishop, 1446–1472), the choir and the Bauchun Chapel (on the east side of the south transept) under James Goldwell (bishop, 1472–1499) and the transepts after 1520. The system of vaulting is of a tierceron vault with Lierne ribs forming patterns of lozenges and stars along the ridge. The vaulting was carried out in a spectacular manner with hundreds of ornately carved, painted and gilded bosses studding the liernes.

=== Plan ===
Measuring 461 ft (141 m) and 177 ft (54 m) wide at completion, Norwich Cathedral was the largest building in East Anglia. The ground plan remains entirely as it was in Norman times, except for that of the easternmost chapel. The cathedral has an unusually long nave of 14 bays. The transepts are without aisles and the east end terminates in an apse with an ambulatory. From the ambulatory there is access to two chapels of unusual shape, the plan of each being based on two intersecting circles. This allows more correct orientation of the altars than in the more normal kind of radial chapel.

=== Exterior ===
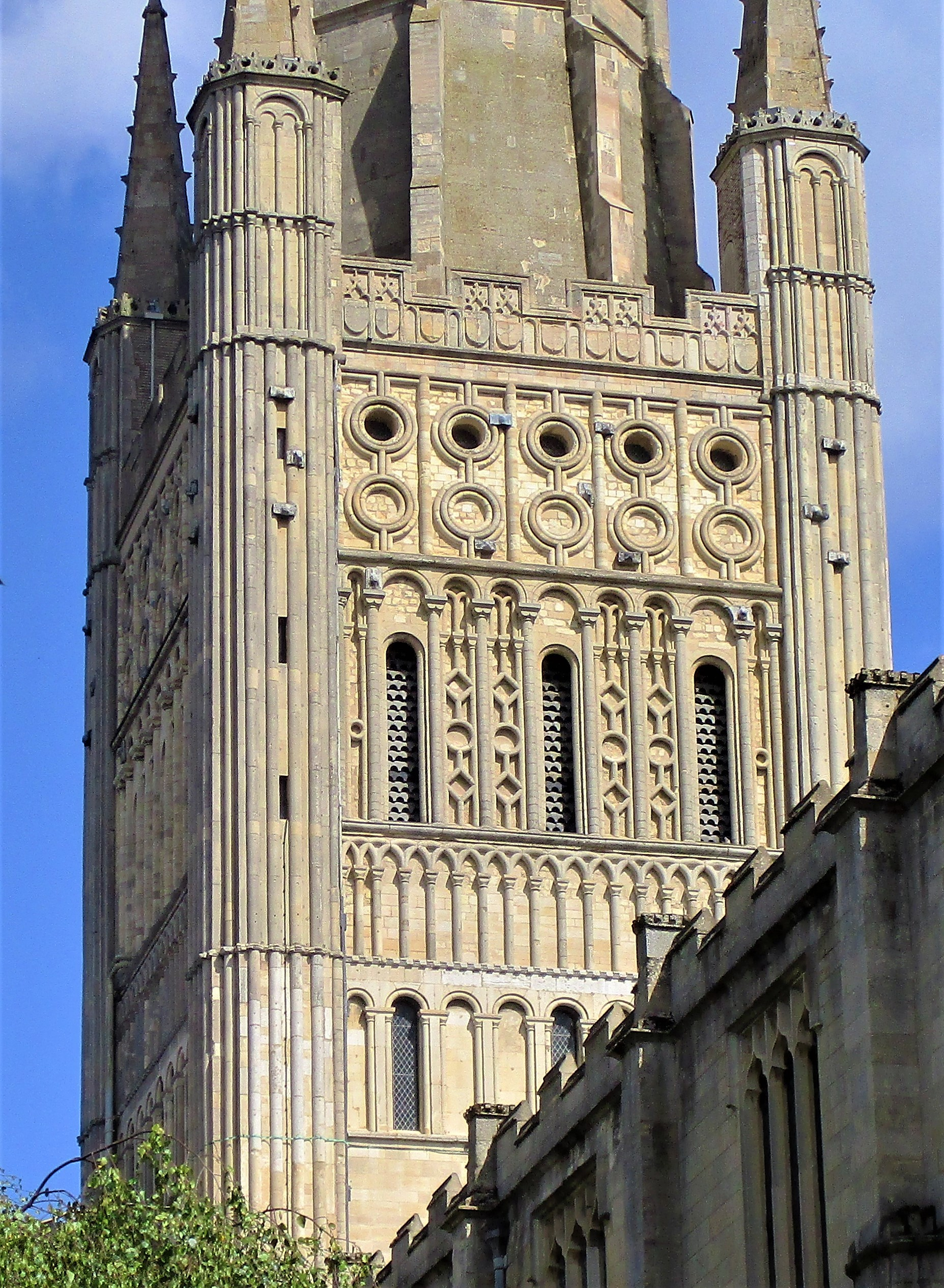
Norwich Cathedral tower (detail)

The tower, the most ambitious of all the Norman towers to have survived in England, is decorated with geometrical circles, lozenges and interlaced arcading.

The spire is of brick faced with stone, supported on brick squinches built into the Norman tower. At 315 ft (96 m) high, the spire is the second tallest in England; only that of Salisbury is taller at 404 ft (123 m).

Norwich Cathedral has the second largest cloisters in England, only exceeded by those at Salisbury Cathedral. It has two-storeys, the only example of its kind in England and nearly 400 carved stone ceiling bosses.

=== Interior ===
The eastern end of the cathedral, near to the sanctuary, is in the form of an apse The tribune (the vaulted area within the apse) is unusually tall, and contains piers with large capitals.

Norwich no longer has its rood screen, which would have been used to support the great crucifix. It was located one bay west of the pulpitum (the screen that separated the nave from the choir). The aisles are vaulted in stone, but lack ribs.

The Anglican cathedrals at Norwich, Salisbury, and Ely are the only ones that have no ring of bells. The astronomical clock at Norwich Cathedral was one of the earliest mechanical timekeepers made in England.

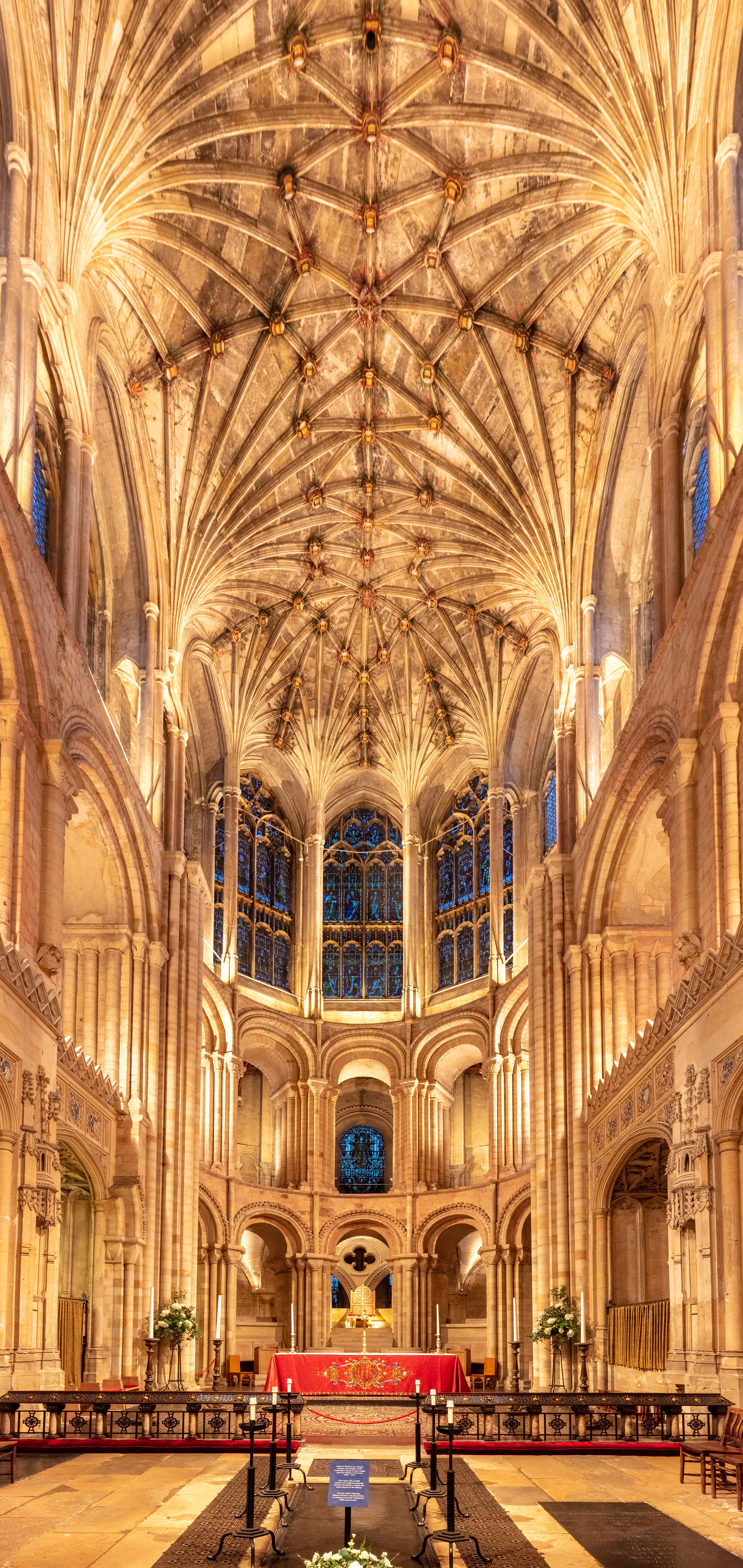
The east end and apse

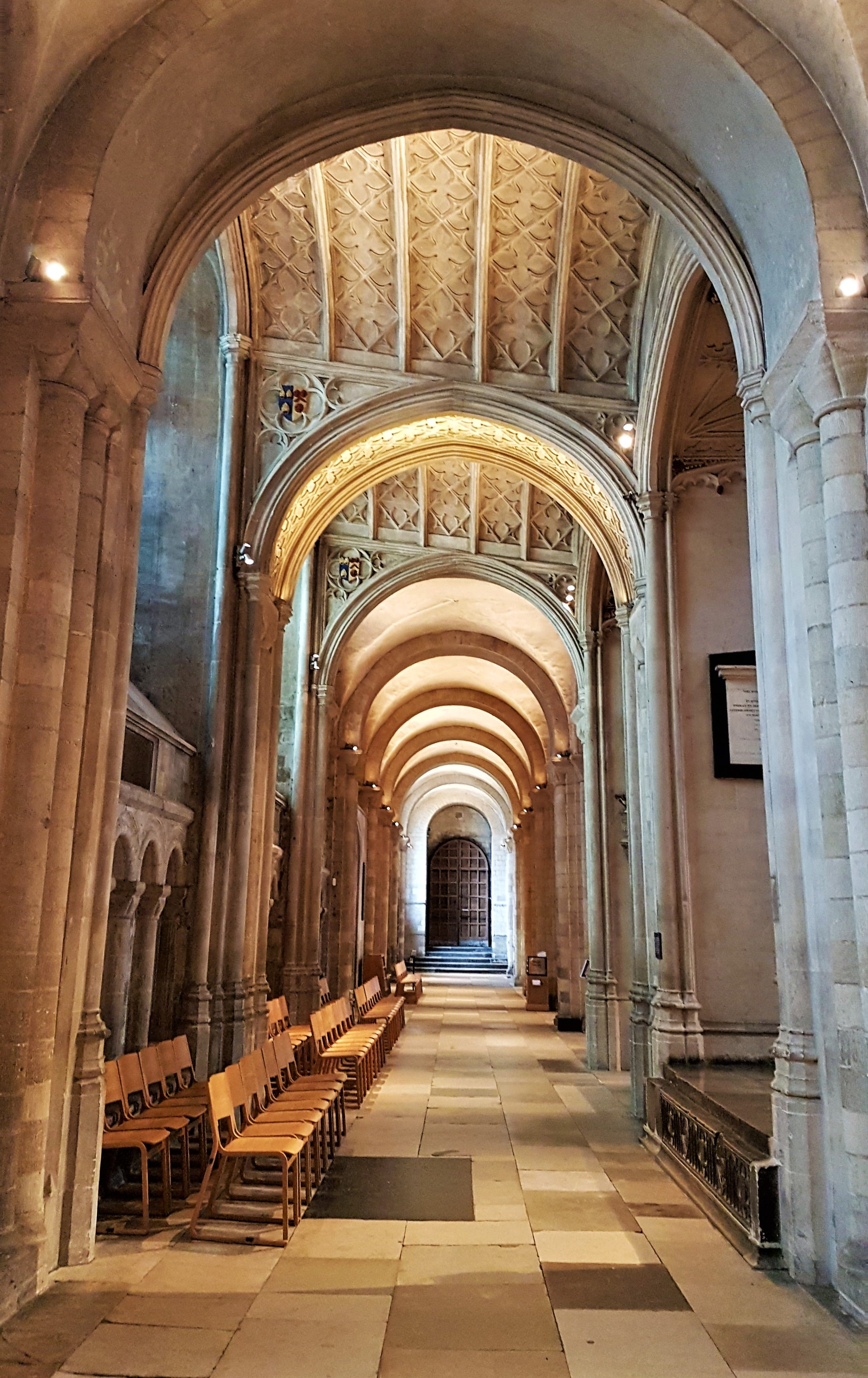
The south aisle, looking west

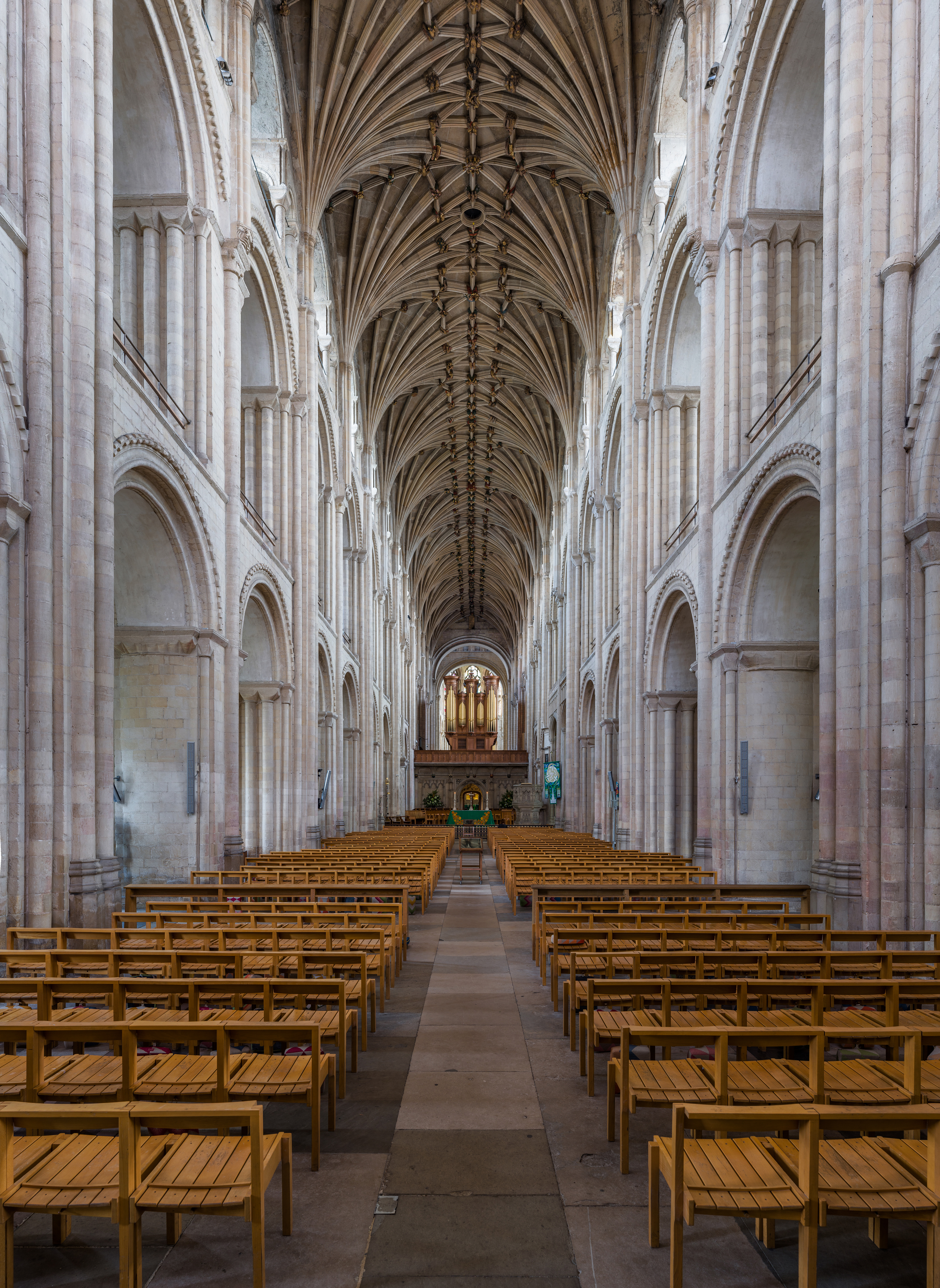
The nave

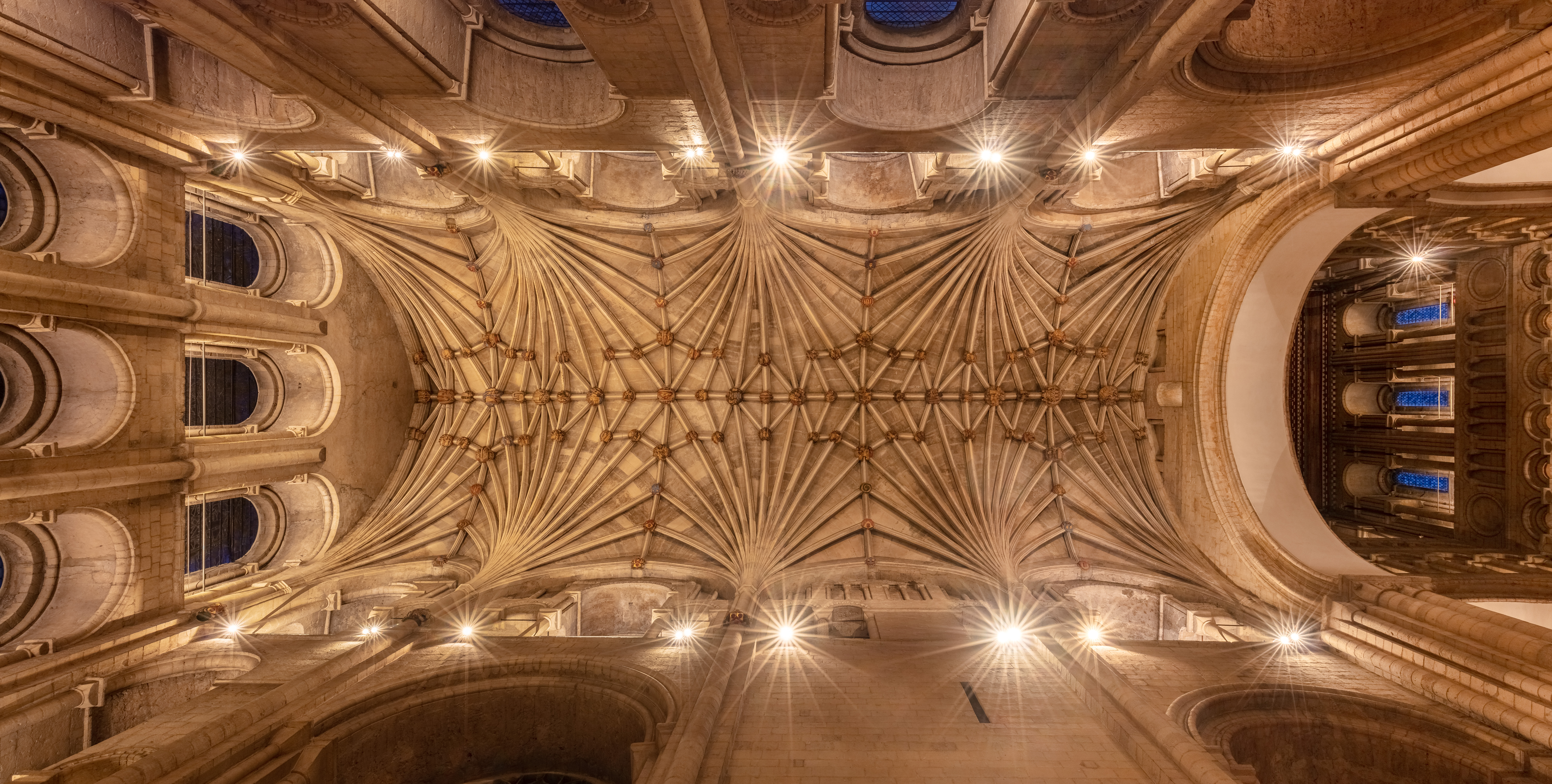
Ceiling

== Art works and treasures ==
=== Stained glass ===
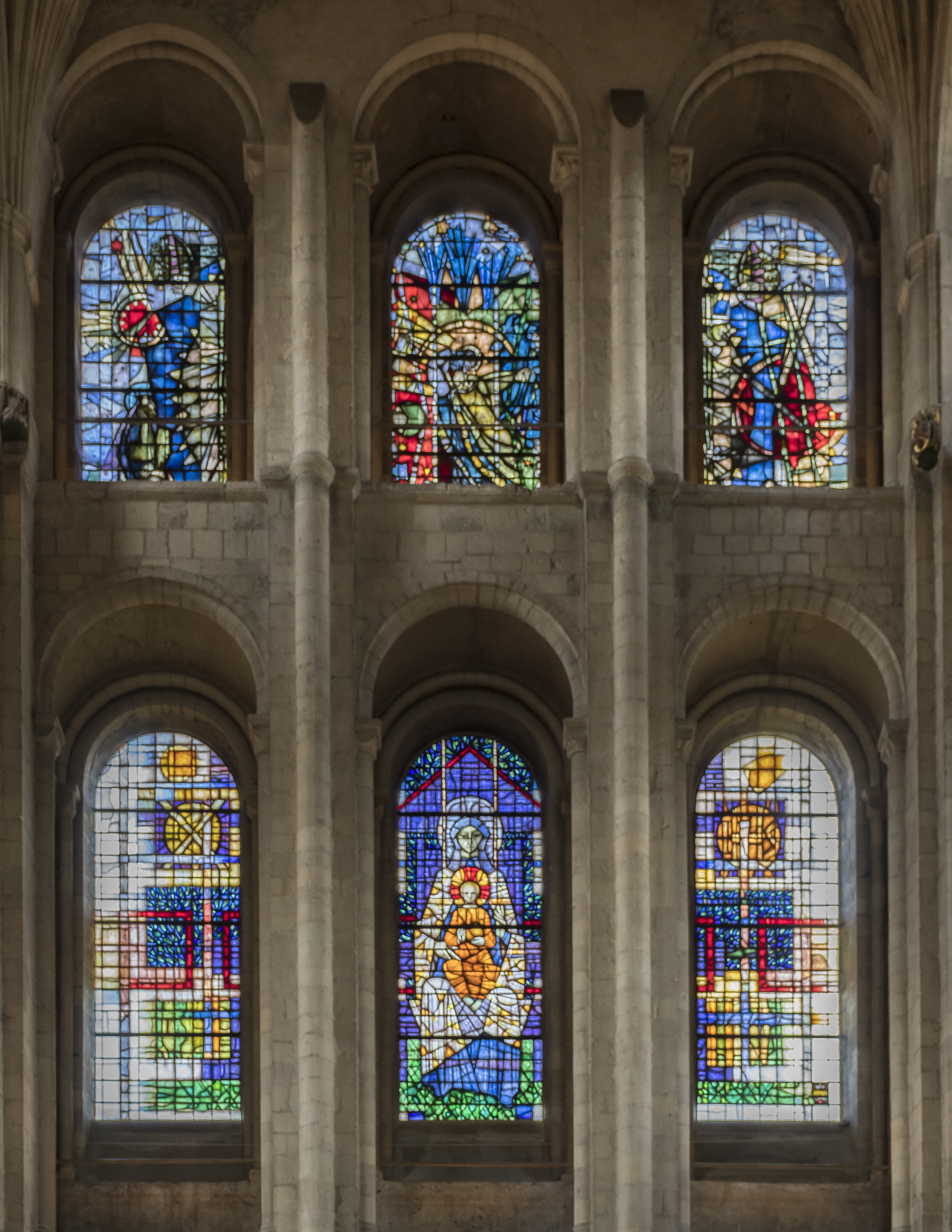
North transept windows by Keith New (above) and John Hayward (below)

The medieval stained glass windows in the cathedral, which was largely destroyed during the English Reformation, sustained further damage during the English Civil War. The glass in the west window was designed by George Hedgeland, and was installed in 1854.

In 1999, the cathedral chapter commissioned John Hayward to make three stained glass panels for the lower register of windows in the north transept, asking him to take account of an existing window by Keith New that had been recently installed in the upper register. New’s panel, depicting the Conversion of St Paul, had originally been made in 1958 for Sir Christopher Wren’s church of St Stephen Walbrook in the City of London before being removed during a 1991 reordering. As part of this commission, Hayward acquired two further panels by New that had been removed from the same church. He placed these either side of the first to form a group of three, thereby creating a dialogue with his own windows positioned immediately below, which depict the Virgin and Child.

=== Bosses ===
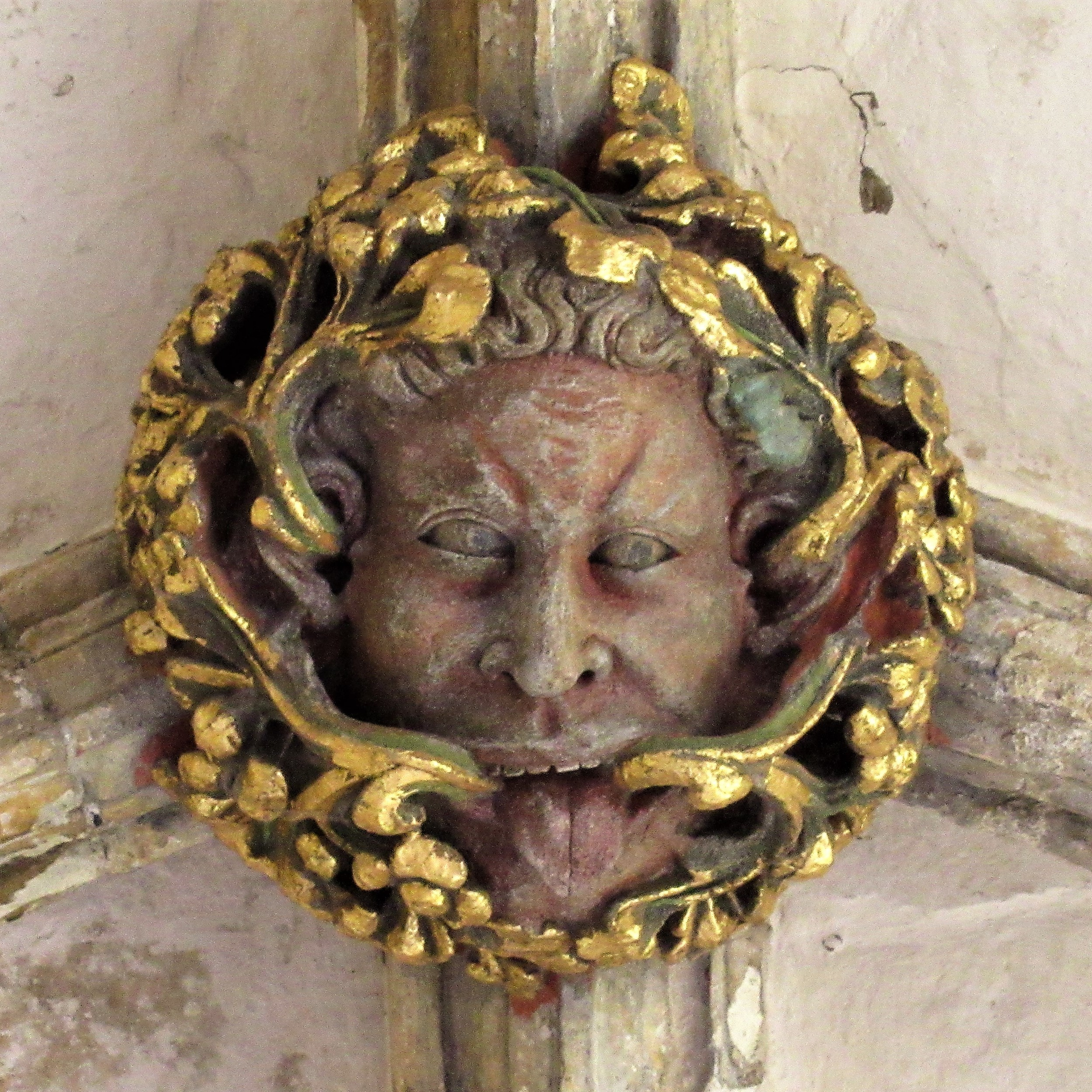
Foliate Man. Boss in the east walk of the cloister, 1310–1314

The bosses of Norwich Cathedral are one of the world's greatest mediaeval sculptural treasures, and a near miraculous survival of the iconoclasm from the Tudor and English Civil War periods. They have been described by the church historian Charles John Philip Cave as "undoubtedly the most important series in the country". There are over 1,000 bosses; the earliest subjects are natural, mostly flowers and foliage. Then come figural representations such as foliate men, acrobats, mythical animals, hunting scenes and single bosses which show a story such as events from the lives of the saints. Then there are narratives which tell a story in a sequence of bosses. The nave vault shows the history of the world from the creation. Later bosses revert to foliage or formal subjects such as coats of arms.

The bosses can be seen most clearly in the cloisters, where they are lower than those elsewhere. The east range has much foliage, and a sequence of the Passion of Jesus. The north range has the Resurrection and scenes of Mary, mother of Jesus and the saints. The south and west walk have the Apocalypse, as well as the Annunciation and Herod's Feast. Catalogues of the cloister bosses have been published by M.R. James (1911), with drawings of the bosses of the north walk.

=== Misericords ===
During the Middle Ages, the monks assembled eight times daily for the canonical hours, and the greater part of their services was recited while standing. In time, some monasteries fitted stalls with ledges for the monk to lean against. The so-called 'misericords' were literally an act of mercy. Most of the misericords are carved with a central subject and two supporters positioned on either side.

There were likely to have once been 70 choir-stalls at Norwich, which were allotted to the bishop and his senior clerics, and 60 monks. There are 64 surviving choir-stalls, of which all but four have misericords dating from the early 15th century onwards; it is possible that the more senior clergymen were able to choose the theme for the carving on their own misericord. The elbow rests were also intricately carved. Many of the supporters in Norwich's choir-stalls are connected with their central subject, as in the case of the misericord for Bishop Richard Courtenay, which is a seated monk who supporters are a bishop tending sheep, and by a representation of the bishop as Chancellor of Oxford. The fire of 1463 at Norwich damaged many of the stalls, whose replacements were given new misericords.

The misericords in Norwich Cathedral can be categorised by their designs. A group known as Wakering's have ledges that are curved and ribbed, battlement patterns, and are carved with the coats of arms of the patrons who helped to pay for the rebuilding of the choir. The so-called Goldwell misericords have more rounded ledges and a pair of lobes. The two Nykke misericords have characteristically carved seat edges. The subjects chosen appear to be random in nature, with a wide selection of real and legendary animals, tasks, events, people (both actual and imaginary), representations of the seven deadly sins, and stories (mostly non-Biblical) being carved.

Misericords

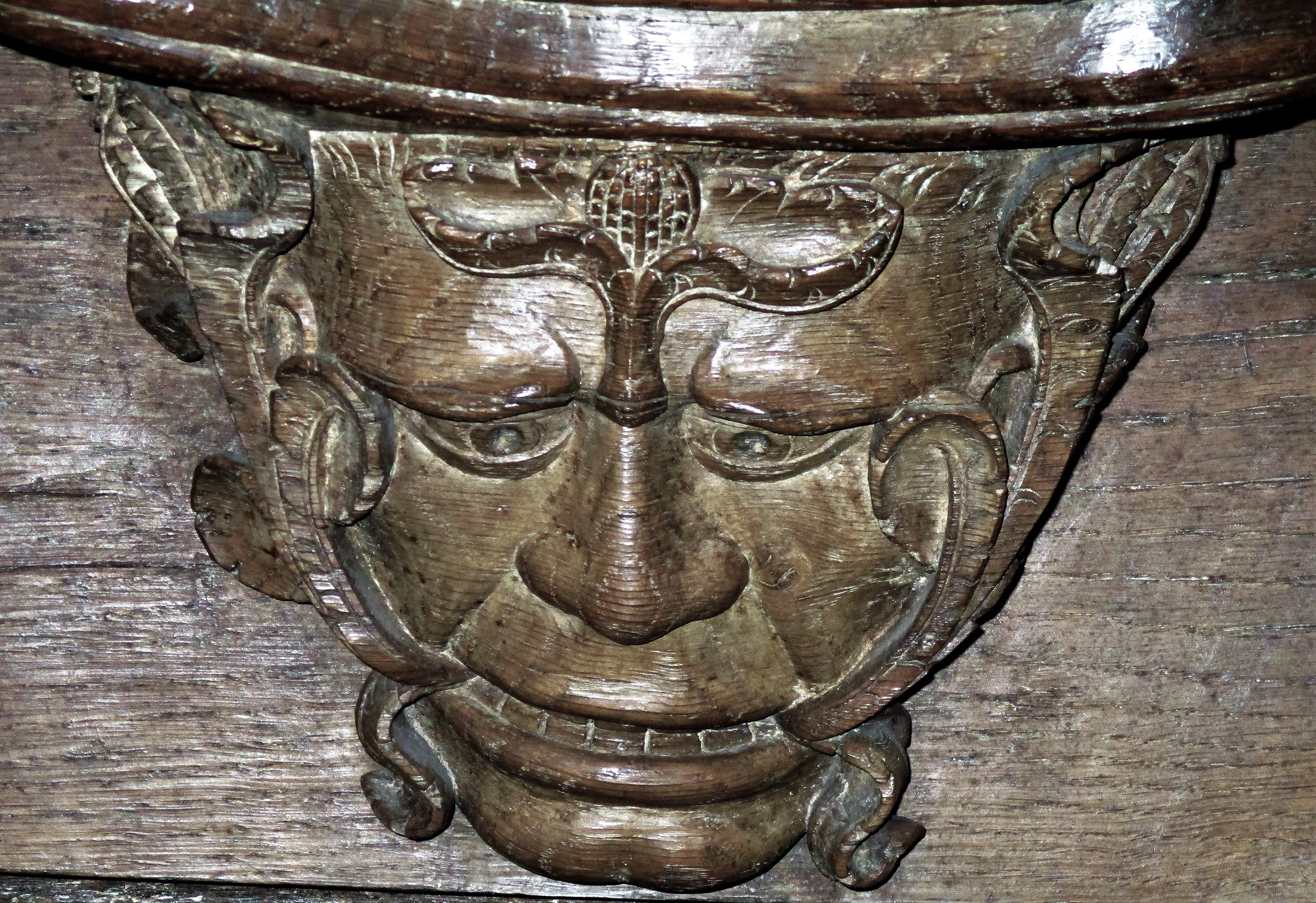
A foliate mask

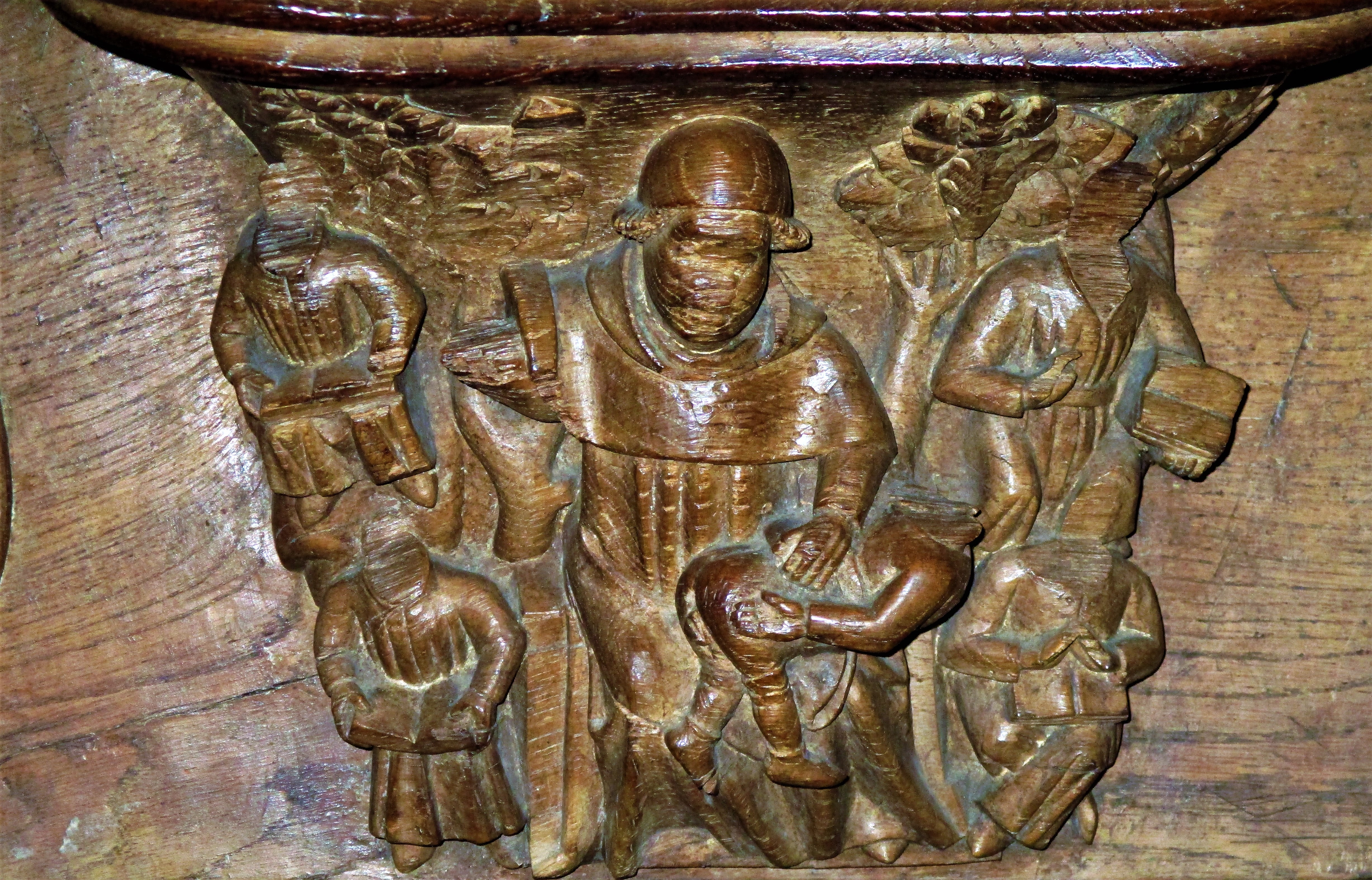
A schoolmaster beating a boy

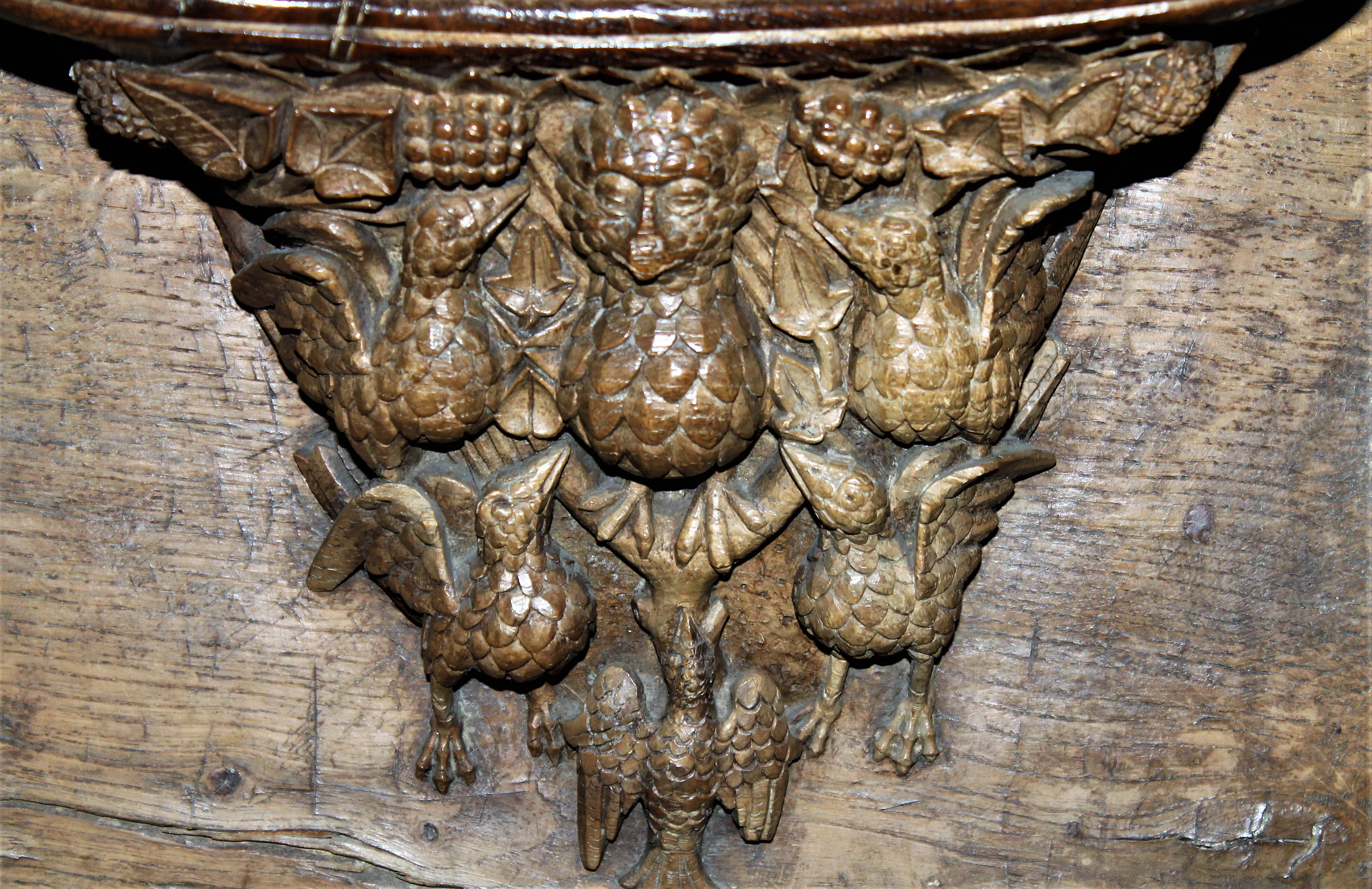
An owl mobbed by small birds

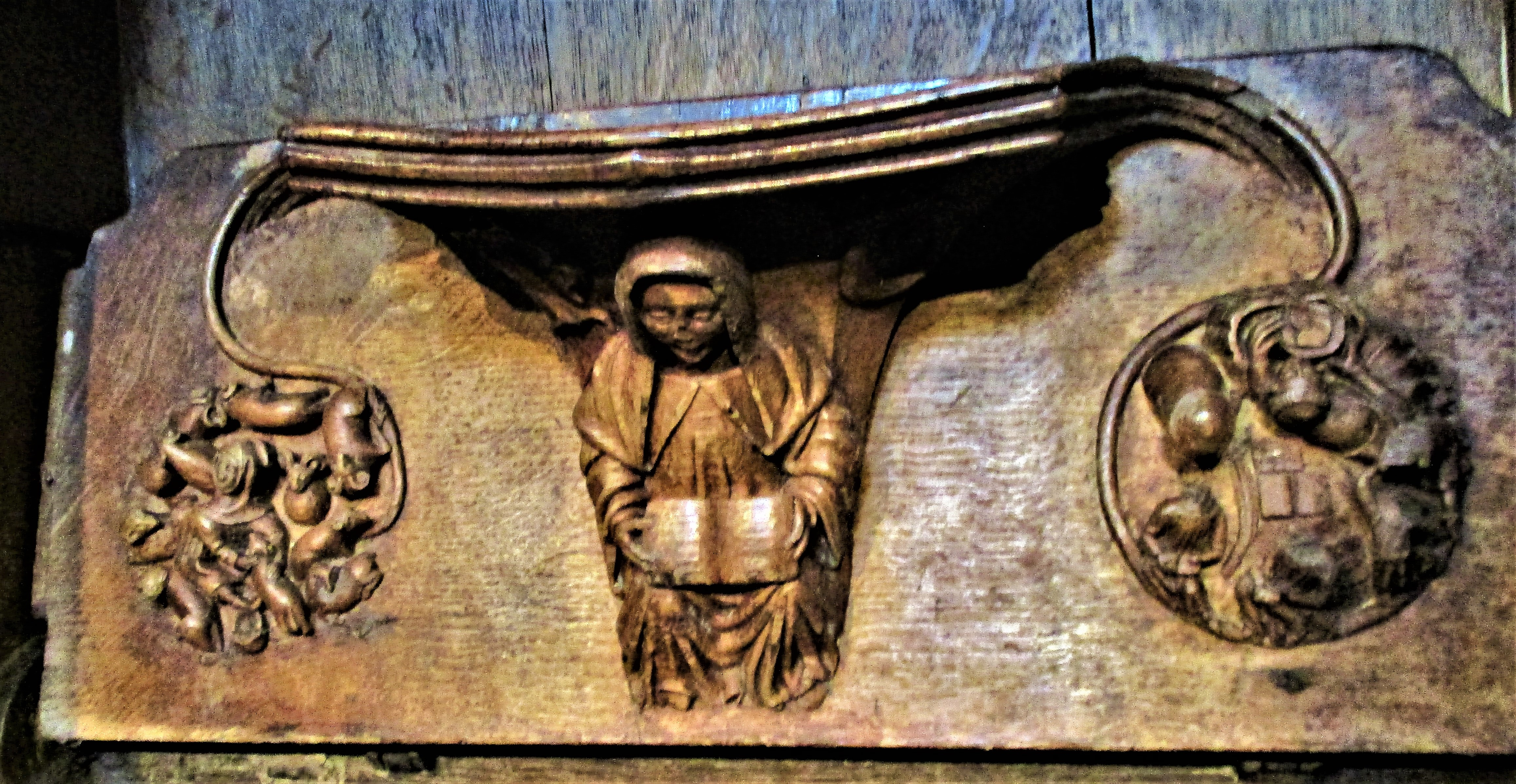
A monk and supporting scenes, representing Bishop Richard Courtenay

=== Despenser Reredos ===
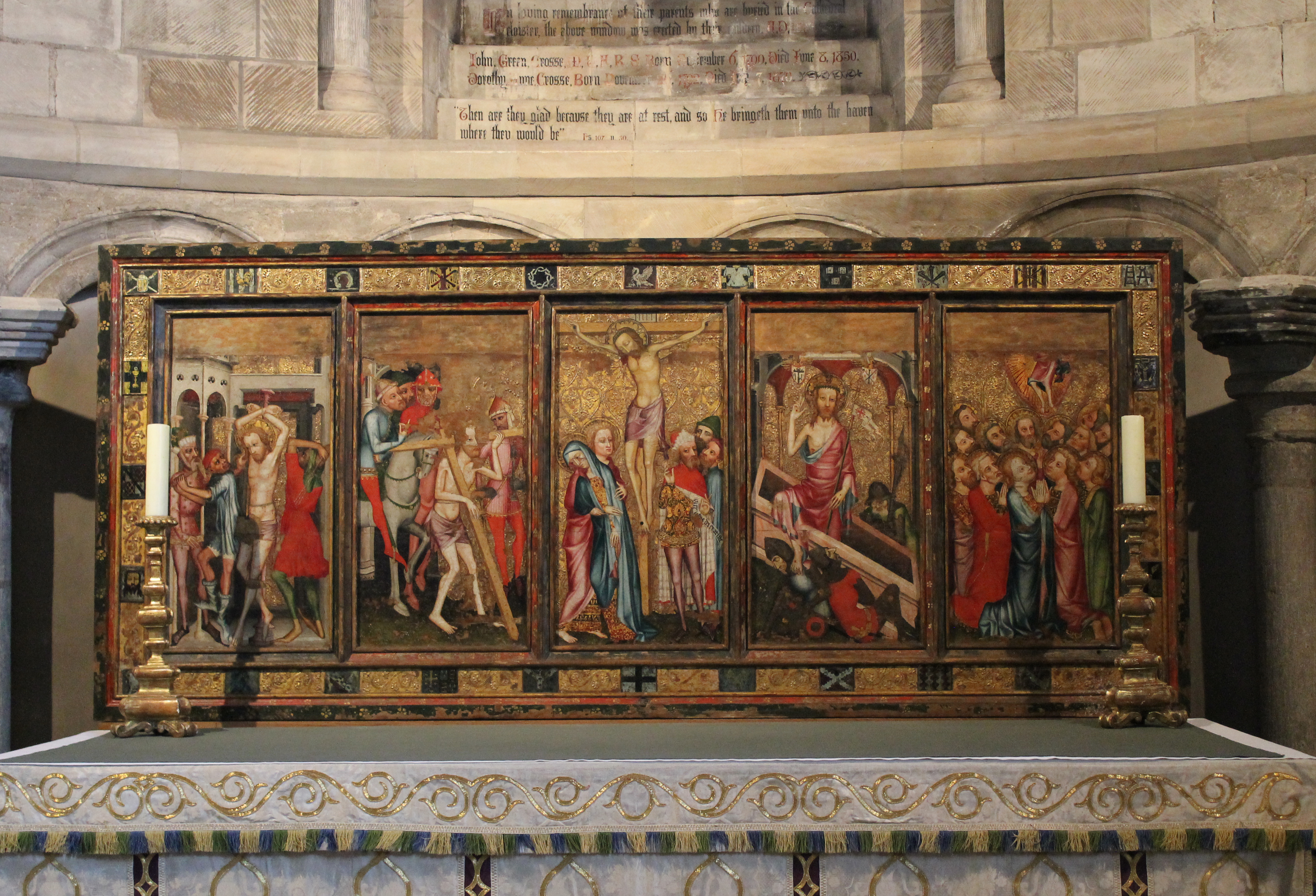
The medieval Despenser Reredos

In St Luke's Chapel, behind the altar, is a late 14th century altarpiece, known as the Despenser Retable or Despenser Reredos. It was named after the Bishop of Norwich, Henry le Despenser (1369–1406). During the Peasants' Revolt of 1381, Despenser's forces successfully contained the revolt in Norfolk, and the reredos may have been commissioned as an act of thanksgiving. Shields in the border of the painting are associated with others who led the defence against the peasants. The reredos was rediscovered in a damaged state in 1847, having been reversed and used as part of a table.

=== Other features ===
The copper baptismal font, standing on a moveable base in the nave, was fashioned from bowls previously used for making chocolate in the Norwich Rowntree's factory, and was given to the cathedral after the factory closed in 1994. Since 2013, the Norfolk Medieval Graffiti Survey (NMGS) has recorded a large amount of medieval graffiti, including organ music inscribed on two four-line staves, on the interior stone surfaces of the cathedral.

== Music ==
=== Organ and organists ===
Norwich Cathedral's organ is one the largest in the UK. It was built by local builder Norman and Beard in 1899, but was later damaged in a fire in April 1938. A Cymbelstern with six bells and a rotating star was added to the organ in 1969. In 2017 the dean, the Very Rev Dr Jane Hedges, revealed that the cathedral was planning to spend £2 million on rebuilding the organ and supporting its existing choirs. In 2022–23 the Durham-based company of Harrison & Harrison carried out a major rebuild of the organ, which was inaugurated in November 2023.

Most of the records of the organists at Norwich Cathedral have survived. The earliest organist recorded is Adam the Organist, who was employed in 1333. Notable organists have included the composers Thomas Morley, and Heathcote Dicken Statham.

=== Cathedral choirs ===
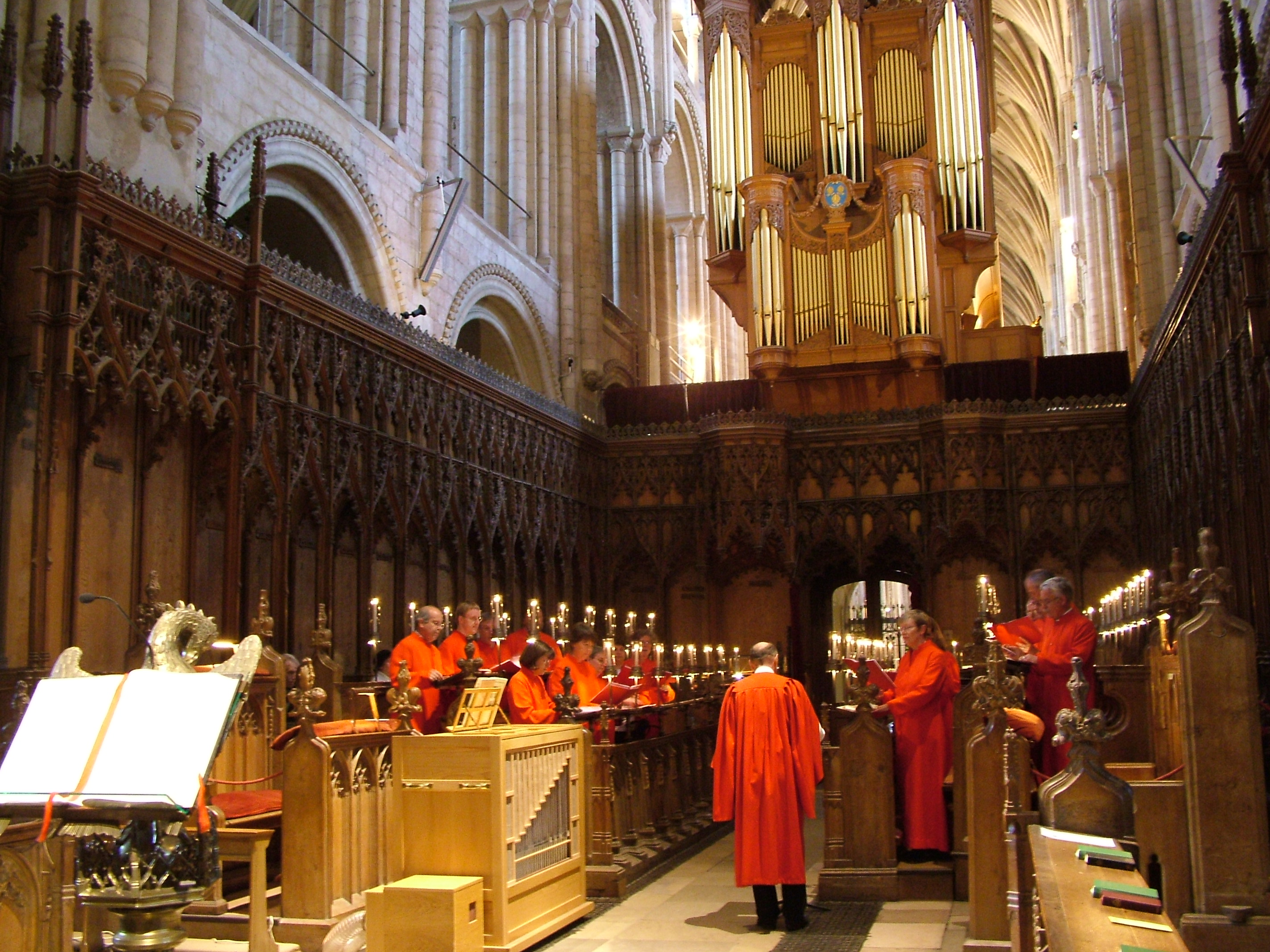
The cathedral choir in 2004

Norwich Cathedral's choirs are directed by the Master of the Music, Ashley Grote. There are places for around 20 boys aged from 7 to 13, attend Norwich School and its Lower School, with at least half of their school fees being paid by the Norwich Cathedral Endowment Fund.

Girls were introduced to the choir in 1995. There are places for 24 girls, aged from 11 to 18, who are drawn from across Norfolk. They sing evensong once a week (alternately on their own and with the men) and at least one Sunday Eucharist a term.

The choir has 12 men, six of whom are choral scholars; the others are professional singers. The men sing with the boy choristers at five services a week, and often more at special times of year such as Easter and Christmas.

== Turret Clock ==
A turret clock was installed in the tower in 1872, the gift of Dean Meyrick Goulburn, which chimed the quarters on five bells, and struck the hour on the tenor bell. The clock included a five-legged gravity escapement and a 1¼ second temperature compensated pendulum. The quarter chimes were composed by Precentor Medley.

== Bells ==
Audio recording of Norwich Cathedral bells at 11am

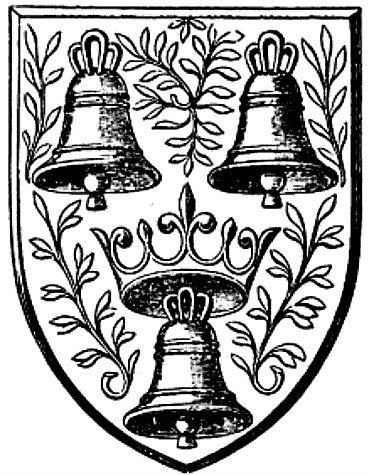
Brasyer's merchant mark

The cathedral church's five bells are hung in the central tower; four are engraved with the medieval merchant mark of Brasyers of Norwich. The bells, which are tuned to a minor key, were used for the regular services, whilst an additional group of five so-called 'greater' bells were hung in a detached bell tower; these were used to celebrate important religious festivals. They were heavier than those hung in the cathedral church.

As with similar large churches, the tower was close to the entrance of the lay citizens' cemetery, and was surrounded by craft shops. It is possible that the bell tower was built to enable the citizens of Norwich to hear the bells being rung during a festival or a funeral. The tower was targeted during the Norwich riots of 1272, who captured it and fired arrows and missiles down upon their enemies. After being rebuilt using limestone during the 1310s, and a lead spire was added. The location of the building, which was demolished by 1569, was lost until 1956, when masonry was accidentally exposed after the area was dug up for a new water main.

The cathedral's mediaeval records state that one of the central tower bells was named 'Blessed Mary', and that.the largest bell in the tower was called 'Lakenham'. The locations of two other named bells, called 'Stratton' and 'Stockton', are unknown.

Number	Name	Date	Maker	Inscription	Diameter
1st	One named "Blessed Mary"	medieval	Brasyers	Fac Margareta nobis hec Munera leta	28.375 inches (720.7 mm)
2nd	One named "Blessed Mary"	medieval	Brasyers	Andrea quesumus, famulorum suscipe Vota	30.375 inches (771.5 mm)
3rd	One named "Blessed Mary"	1635	John Brend	–	33.5 inches (850 mm)
4th	One named "Blessed Mary"	medieval	Brasyers	Subbeniat digna, donantibus hanc Katerina	37.5 inches (950 mm)
5th	One named "Blessed Mary"	1469	Brasyers	Sum Rosa Pulsata Mundi, Maria bocata. Orate pro aia: Roberti Brethenham Monachi Norwici	41.5 inches (1,050 mm)

== Library ==
The library at Norwich Cathedral is located on the first floor of the Cloister. It contains books that date back the 15th century. It hosts courses run by the Norwich Centre for Christian Learning.

== The Close ==
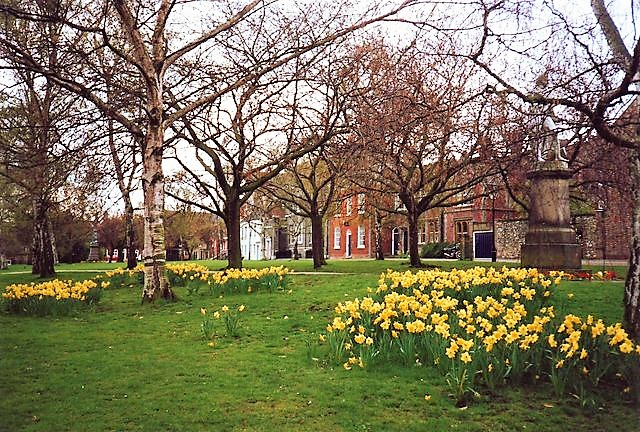
The western end of the cathedral close

The precinct, or cathedral close, is enclosed within the limits of the former monastery. It is bordered by the Tombland area (the Anglo-Saxon market place) and the Wensum. It contains buildings from the 15th to the 19th centuries, including the remains of an infirmary. The close has an area of 85 acres (34 ha) and is notable for being located within the city's defensive walls. In medieval times it occupied a tenth of the total area of the city.

The grounds also house many of the buildings of Norwich School, as well as statues of the leading military and political figure, the Duke of Wellington and the British Naval officer Admiral Nelson, and the grave of the British nurse Edith Cavell, who was executed for helping Allied soldiers escape from German-occupied Belgium during World War I.

There are two gates leading into the cathedral grounds, both on Tombland. The Ethelbert Gate takes its name from a Saxon church that stood nearby. The original gate was destroyed in the riot of 1272, and its replacement was built in the early 14th century. It has two storeys, the upper originally a chapel dedicated to Saint Ethelbert and decorated with flushwork. In 1420 the soldier and administrator Sir Thomas Erpingham, benefactor to the city, had the gate which bears his name built, sited opposite the west door of the cathedral and leading into the close.

== In the arts and popular culture ==
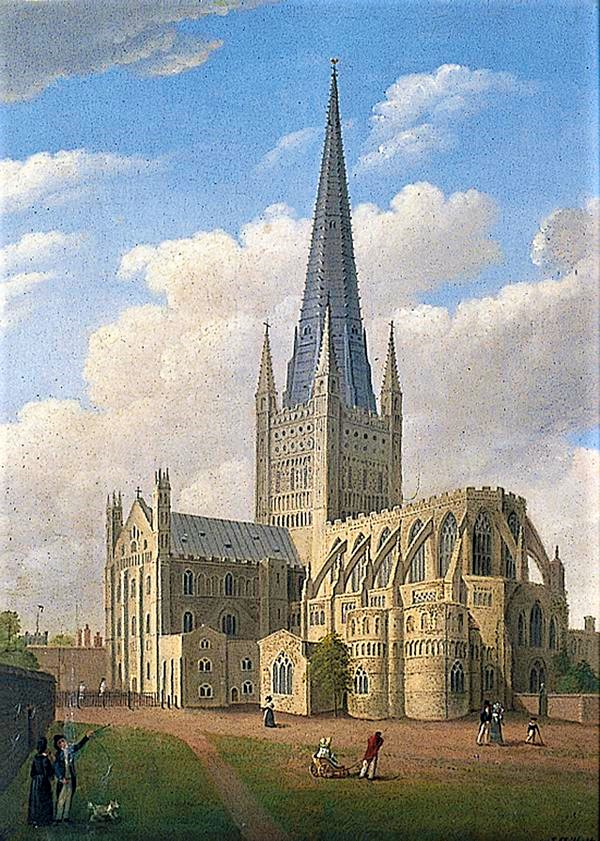
James Sillett, Norwich Cathedral (1832), Norfolk Museums Collections

=== Documentaries ===
The cathedral and other churches in the diocese were featured in the 1974 BBC documentary A Passion for Churches, presented by the English poet and writer John Betjeman. In 2012, the cathedral and the adjacent Bishop's Palace were featured in the BBC Four documentary The Medieval Mind: How to Build a Cathedral. The cathedral was featured in the 2016 BBC Four documentary The Search for the Lost Manuscript: Julian of Norwich.

=== Use as a location ===
Norwich Cathedral was used as a location for the 1971 BBC Christmas ghost story The Stalls of Barchester, based on the story by M. R. James. It was also used as a location for the 2013 film Jack the Giant Slayer, and in the 2017 feature film Tulip Fever.

== See also ==
- List of burials at Norwich Cathedral
- Architecture of the medieval cathedrals of England
- List of Romanesque buildings#England
- List of cathedrals in the United Kingdom
- List of Gothic Cathedrals in Europe
- List of tallest structures built before the 20th century

== Sources ==
- Atherton, Ian; Fernie, Eric; Harper-Bill, Christopher; Smith, Hassell, eds. (1996). Norwich Cathedral: Church, City and Diocese, 1096–1996. London: The Hambleton Press. ISBN 978-1-85285-134-7.
- Blomefield, Francis (1806). "City of Norwich, chapter 41: Of the Cathedral Church and its Precinct". An Essay Towards A Topographical History of the County of Norfolk. Vol. 4, the History of the City and County of Norwich, Part II. London: British History Online. pp. 1–46.
- Boyd, Morrison Comegys (1962). Elizabethan Music and Musical Criticism (2nd ed.). Philadelphia: University of Pennsylvania Press. OCLC 599711.
- Britton, John (1816). The History and Antiquities of the See and Cathedral Church of Norwich. London: Longman, Hurst, Rees, Orme, and Brown. OCLC 44036545.
- Bumpus, T. Francis (1929). The Cathedrals of England and Wales. London: T. Werner Laurie. OCLC 5626538.
- Challis, M.G. (1998). Life in Medieval England: as Portrayed on Church Misericords & Bench Ends. Nettlebed, UK: Teamband. ISBN 978-18981-8-701-1.
- Cave, Charles John Philip (1948). Roof Bosses in Medieval Churches: An Aspect of Gothic Sculpture. CUP Archive. pp. 12–13. GGKEY:QEY40Z28LJ5.
- Clifton-Taylor, Alec (1989). The Cathedrals of England. Norwich: Thames and Hudson. ISBN 978-0-500-20062-9.
- Gilchrist, Roberta (2016). Norwich Cathedral Close: The Evolution of the English Cathedral Landscape. Studies in the History of Medieval Religion. Vol. 26. Boydell Press. ISBN 978-1-84383-173-0.
- Hall, Joseph (1710). Bishop Hall's Hard Measure: written by himself upon his impeachment of High Crimes and Misdemeanours for defending the Church of England. London. OCLC 1064109060.
- James, Montague Rhodes (1911). The Sculptured Bosses in the Cloisters of Norwich Cathedral. Norwich: Norfolk and Norwich Archaeological Society. OCLC 1277156956.
- Johnston, Ronald John (1986). Bell-ringing: The English Art of Change-ringing. London; New York: Harmondsworth; Viking. ISBN 978-0-670-80176-3.
- L'Estrange (1874). The Church Bells of Norfolk: Where, When, and by Whom They Were Made, with the Inscriptions on All the Bells in the County. Norwich, UK: Miller and Leavins. OCLC 562138800.
- Mottram, Ralph Hale (1948). The Glories of Norwich Cathedral. London: Winchester Publications. OCLC 1285567428.
- Pevsner, Nikolaus (2002). Norfolk. 1, North-East Norfolk and Norwich. The Buildings of England. New Haven; London: Yale University Press. ISBN 978-03000-9-607-1.
- Pounds, Norman John Greville (2005). The Medieval City. Westport, Connecticut: Greenwood Publishing Group. ISBN 978-0-313-32498-7.
- Quennell, Charles Henry Bourne (1900) [1898]. The Cathedral Church of Norwich: A Description of its Fabric and a Brief History of the Episcopal See. London: G. Bell & Sons.
- Rose, Martial; Hedgecoe, Julia (1997). Stories in Stone: The Medieval Roof Carvings of Norwich Cathedral. New York: Thames and Hudson. ISBN 978-0-500-27937-3.
- Rose, Martial (2003). The Misericords of Norwich Cathedral. Dereham, UK: Larks Press. ISBN 978-19040-0-615-2.
- Sims, Tony (2000). "The Erpingham Gate". In Curry, Anne (ed.). Agincourt 1415: Henry V, Sir Thomas Erpingham and the Triumph of the English Archers. Stroud: Tempus Publishing Ltd. pp. 91–103. ISBN 978-0-7524-1780-6.
- Spink, Ian (1965). "Morley of Norwich". The Musical Times. 106 (1474): 949. doi:10.2307/954347. JSTOR 954347.
- Stewart, DJ. (1875). "Notes on Norwich Cathedral". The Archaeological Journal. 32.
- Thurlow, A.G.G. (1946). "The Bells of Norwich Cathedral". Norfolk Archaeology. 29 (1). Norwich: Norfolk and Norwich Archaeological Society.
- Walters, Henry Beauchamp (1912). Church Bells of England. London: H. Frowde. OCLC 1041812382.
- West, John Ebenezer (1921). Cathedral Organists Past and Present. London: Novello. OCLC 1041811137.
- Woodforde (1950). The Norwich School of Glass-painting in the Fifteenth Century. Oxford: Oxford University Press. OCLC 1039522051.
