= William Sawtrey =

British Roman Catholic priest (died 1401)

The execution of William Sawtrey from Foxe's Book of Martyrs

William Sawtrey, also known as William Salter (died March 1401) was an English priest and Lollard martyr. He was executed for heresy.

Sawtrey was born in Norfolk, England. He was a follower of John Wycliffe, the leader of an early reformation movement called Lollardy.

== Sawtrey's association with Lollardy ==
Sawtrey was a priest at two Norfolk churches, St Margaret's in Lynn and Tilney. (Note: There are two villages with parish churches in Norfolk called Tilney, Tilney All Saints and Tilney St Lawrence, and it is unclear which this one was.)

He preached and endorsed Lollard beliefs, including the rejection of Catholic saints and the sacrament of Eucharist. Of the latter, he claimed that "after the consecration [of the host] by the priest there remaineth true material bread" (Trevelyan 334).

As a result of spreading these views, Sawtrey was taken to Henry le Despenser on 30 April 1399. Le Despenser, at the time the Bishop of Norwich, ordered an examination of Sawtrey. The examination lasted for two days, held at the Bishop's palace, South Elmham Hall. Sawtrey's examiners claimed that he rejected free will, and that he did not believe in venerating images and embarking on pilgrimages. He was therefore charged with heresy and held in an episcopal prison. A mound was being prepared for the lollard on nearby Greshaw Green, a nearby large common. As this would provide a suitable site for the burning of a heretic, lollard scholar Maureen Jurkowski, has suggested that this may have persuaded Sawtrey to secure his release by denouncing Lollardy. He abjured privately at first, but then publicly in Lynn on 25 May 1399. He appeared before le Despenser in St John's Hospital, Lynn, the next day, and swore on the Gospels that he would never again preach Lollardy. He also promised to never hear confession without a license from le Despenser. His abjuration was repeated in the Bishop's Chapel, South Elmham several days later.

In 1401, Sawtrey moved to London and began working as a parish-priest at St Osyth's, where he continued to preach Lollard beliefs. It is possible that he moved to London in order to distance himself from le Despenser, but he had not removed himself from the anti-Lollard sentiment of the Catholic Church. One year earlier, De heretico comburendo ("Regarding the burning of heretics") was passed. The statute called for the burning of heretics either plainly rejecting Catholicism, or accepting Catholic beliefs but returning to their previous heretical beliefs. Sawtrey was summoned to appear at St Paul's Cathedral on 12 February 1401.

Sawtrey appeared before Archbishop Thomas Arundel. Before convocation, Sawtrey was delivered the following heretical charges: failure to "adore the true cross" (National Biography 869), belief that a priest's time spent in hourly prayers could be better spent preaching and spreading the word of God, his opinion on the temporalities of the church and on how the money could be put to better use, preaching on adoration of mankind over angels, and finally his belief in consubstantiation. Sawtrey resisted, and was once again charged with heresy.

Sawtrey demanded a copy of his charges and was given 18 February to make an appeal. At his appeal before Parliament he defended his beliefs with quotes from St John, St Paul, and St Augustine. His defence was heavily questioned by Arundel, who spent three hours questioning of the topic of the Eucharist alone, all the while trying to convert him back to Catholicism. Sawtrey resisted, and on 23 February charges were once again made against him. He was condemned and "through seven successive stages he was degraded from priest to doorkeeper, then stripped of every clerical function, attribute, and vestment".

Sawtrey was convicted and sentenced to death on 26 February 1401. In March, he was taken to Smithfield and publicly burned at the stake. He was the first follower of Lollardy to die for his beliefs. He and John Purvey, a friend and follower of John Wycliffe who also was tortured for his beliefs, were the two most egregious cases against Lollardy committed under the Statute of Heresy.

== After effects ==
The lower classes of England were quick to catch on to Lollard ideas, especially about disbursing Church funds to aid people in need and to ease lower class financial stresses caused by heavy taxation. The representatives of the lower class made efforts on two occasions to convince King Henry IV and Parliament to appropriate the Church's money and to use it for the people of England. The Church reacted against this proposal and, with the help of the King, set forth a number of statutes to protect Church temporalities. Among these orders was the statute De heretico comburendo, which stated that heresy was punishable by means of public burning.

The severity of Sawtrey and Purvey's punishments created a wave of Lollard supporters. Among them was John Oldcastle, a knight and captain for the Prince of Wales. He protected and hid preachers from the Statute of Heresy. Oldcastle and other Lollard-sympathising knights pleaded with King Henry IV to change the law. They argued that the King should take the money the Church was wasting and put it into England's armoury, almshouses, and universities. Many students of Oxford University were also Lollard sympathisers. Students translated Wycliffe's work and began to debate the lawfulness of Bible translations.

However, despite their efforts, the persecution of Lollards continued. The knights' arguments were shot down, and Oxford was discredited by the Church. Nevertheless, Lollard believers continued practising their faith in an underground network.
