= Cringleford =

Village in Norfolk, England

Coordinates: 52.6056°N 1.24333°E

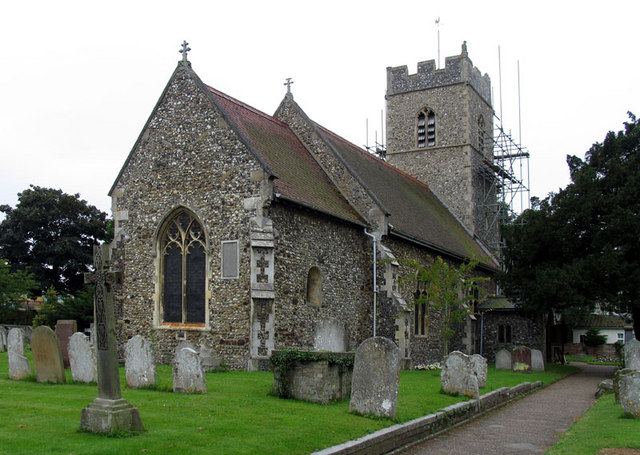
- St. Peter's Church

- Location within Norfolk
- Area: 4.11 km^{2} (1.59 sq mi)
- Population: 4,685 (2021)
  - Density: 1,140/km^{2} (3,000/sq mi)
- OS grid reference: TG197058
  - London: 154km
- Civil parish: Cringleford
- District: South Norfolk
- Shire county: Norfolk
- Region: East
- Country: England
- Sovereign state: United Kingdom
- Post town: NORWICH
- Postcode district: NR4
- Dialling code: 01603
- Police: Norfolk
- Fire: Norfolk
- Ambulance: East of England
- UK Parliament: South Norfolk

Cringleford is a civil parish and village in the English county of Norfolk.

Cringleford is located 5.9 miles (9.5 km) north-east of Wymondham and 2.5 miles (4.0 km) south-west of Norwich city centre. The village sits on the River Yare and forms part of the outskirts of Norwich.

== History ==
Cringleford's name is of mixed Viking and Anglo-Saxon origin and derives from an amalgamation of the Old English and Old Norse for a circular ford over the River Yare.

In the Domesday Book of 1086, Cringleford is listed as a settlement of 25 households located in the hundred of Humbleyard. In 1086, the village was divided between the estates of Odo of Bayeux, Alan of Brittany and Roger Bigod.

== Geography ==
According to the 2021 census, Cringleford has a population of 4,685 people which shows a dramatic increase from the 2,963 people recorded in the 2011 census.

Cringleford is located along the course of the River Yare and the A11, between London and Norwich. The A47, between Birmingham and Lowestoft, also passes through the parish.

== St Peter's Church ==
Cringleford parish church is dedicated to Saint Peter and dates from the late fourteenth century. St Peter's is located on Newmarket Road and has been Grade II listed since 1959.

St. Peter's Church was extended and re-built in the Victorian era and boasts a font from the sixteenth century. The church features stained-glass windows designed by Lavers, Barraud and Westlake (depiction of Saint Giles and Sir Adam de Berford), Herbert Bryans (depicting Saint Andrew) and Charles Eamer Kempe (depicting the Crucifixion of Jesus).

== Amenities ==
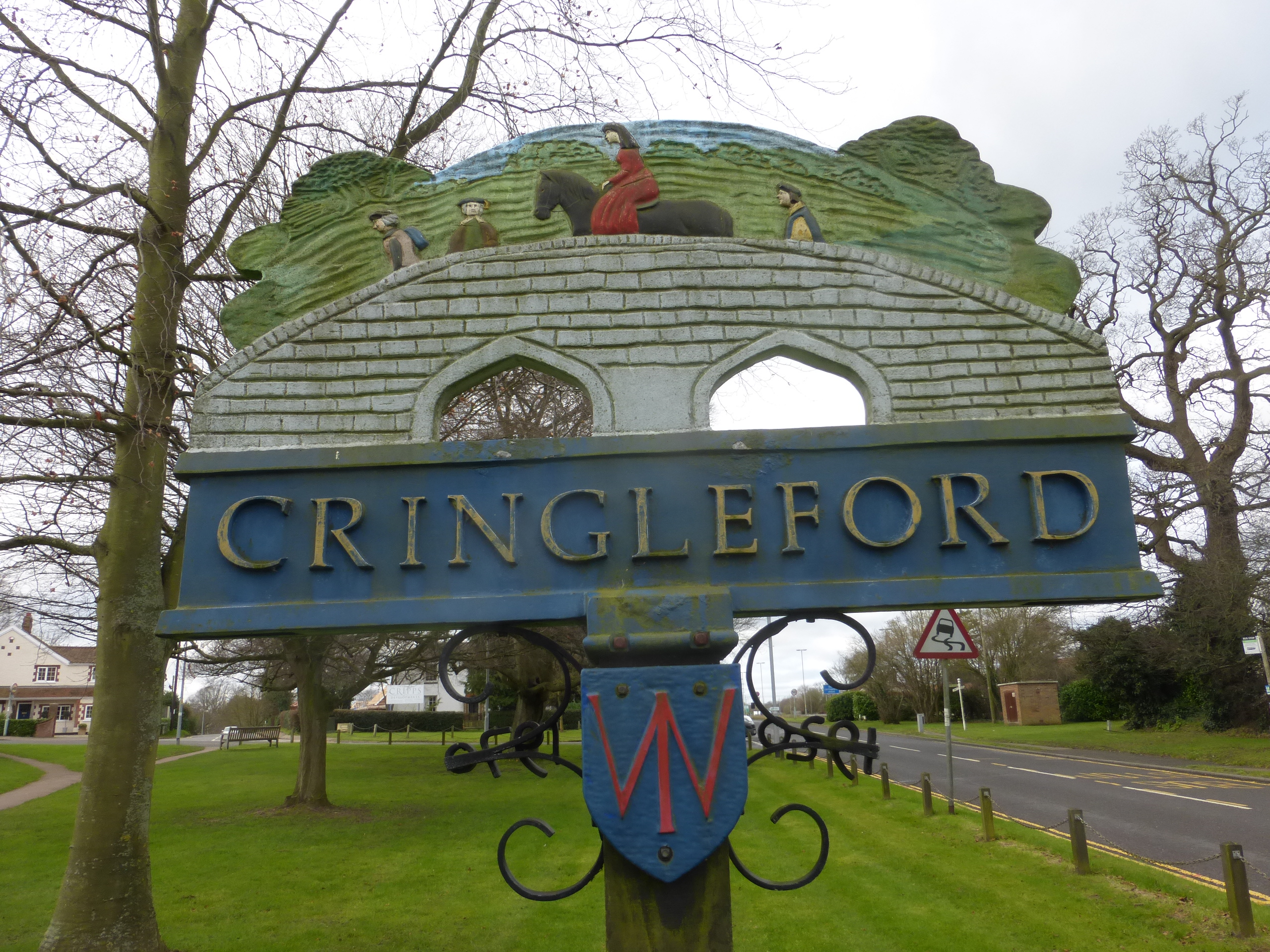
Cringleford village sign

The majority of local children attend Cringleford Church of England Primary School which was recently extensively refurbished and extended. In 2024, Cringleford Primary was rated by Ofsted as 'Good.'

== Sports ==
Cringleford Lodge Cricket Club was founded in 2000 after the merger of Cringleford C.C. and Earlham Lodge C.C.

Cringleford Junior Football Club was founded in 2005 and is open to Children between ages 5 and 17.

== War memorial ==
Cringleford's war memorial is a carved wooden plaque located inside St. Peter's Church. It lists the following names for the First World War:

| Rank | Name | Unit | Date of death | Burial/Commemoration |
|---|---|---|---|---|
| Capt. | Kenneth N. W. Gilbert MC | 32nd Bty., Royal Field Artillery | 15 Oct. 1918 | St. Peter's Churchyard |
| Lt. | Norman Ayris | 98th Coy., Royal Engineers | 31 Dec. 1915 | Armentières Cemetery |
| Lt. | George K. Hampton | 1/4th Bn., Norfolk Regiment | 16 Aug. 1915 | Azmak Cemetery |
| Lt. | Richard L. A. Bryant | 7th Bn., Suffolk Regiment | 23 May 1917 | Étaples Military Cemetery |
| 2Lt. | Dyker S. Priestley | 108th Coy., Machine Gun Corps | 1 Jul. 1916 | Thiepval Memorial |
| Sgt. | John W. Moore | 2nd (Mounted) Bn., CEF | 21 Mar. 1918 | Aix-Noulette Cemetery |
| Pte. | Bertie George | 8th Bn., Border Regiment | 18 May 1916 | Aubigny Cemetery |
| Pte. | William G. Broom | 4th Bn., Middlesex Regiment | 28 Apr. 1917 | Arras Memorial |
| Pte. | Arthur E. Denmark | 1st Bn., Norfolk Regiment | 14 Sep. 1914 | Chauny Cemetery |
| Pte. | William E. Shorten | 2nd Bn., Norfolk Regt. | 23 Nov. 1915 | Basra Memorial |
| Pte. | Harold F. Bloomfield | 1/4th Bn., Norfolk Regt. | 19 Apr. 1917 | Gaza War Cemetery |
| Pte. | Edwin J. Cubitt | 1/4th Bn., Norfolk Regt. | 5 Dec. 1917 | Port Said Cemetery |
| Pte. | Charles J. Smith | 7th Bn., Norfolk Regt. | 12 Oct. 1916 | Thiepval Memorial |
| Pte. | Edward L. Goodchild | 8th Bn., Norfolk Regt. | 28 Apr. 1916 | Corbie Cemetery |
| Pte. | Ernest Elsey | 9th Bn., Norfolk Regt. | 26 Sep. 1915 | Loos Memorial |
| Pte. | John F. Thrower | 12th Bn., Norfolk Regt. | 19 Aug. 1918 | Grand Hasard Cemetery |
| By2C | Henry P. Fickling | HMS Powerful | 22 Nov. 1918 | Weston Hill Cemetery |

And, the following for the Second World War:

| Rank | Name | Unit | Date of death | Burial/Commemoration |
|---|---|---|---|---|
| Lt-Cdr. | Stanley L. Garrett | HMS Anking | 4 Mar. 1942 | Liverpool Naval Memorial |
| Capt. | Maurice P. Gaymer | 4th Bn., Royal Norfolk Regiment | 12 Feb. 1942 | Kranji War Cemetery |
| F/Lt. | Cyril D. G. Garland | No. 80 Squadron RAF | 28 Nov. 1942 | Heliopolis War Cemetery |
| Cpl. | William A. C. Bond | No. 617 Squadron RAF | 29 Sep. 1944 | Bari War Cemetery |
| LCpl. | Percy H. J. Clark | Pioneer Corps | 26 Feb. 1941 | Plumstead Cemetery |
