= Battle of the North =

Battle of the North or Battle of North may refer to:

== Military conflicts ==
- Battle of North Point
- Battle of North Walsham
- Battle of the North Cape
- Battle of the North Fork of the Red River
- Battle of the North Inch

== Sports ==
- Canadian Championship – a professional soccer tournament
