= Felmingham =

Village in Norfolk, England

Coordinates: 52.8146°N 1.34°E

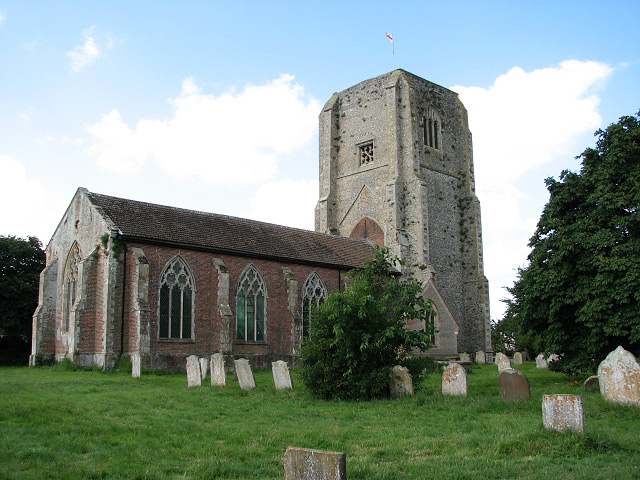
- St Andrew's Church

- Location within Norfolk
- Area: 2.95 sq mi (7.6 km^{2})
- Population: 561
  - Density: 190/sq mi (73/km^{2})
- OS grid reference: TG251293
  - London: 109 miles (175 km)
- Civil parish: Felmingham
- District: North Norfolk
- Shire county: Norfolk
- Region: East
- Country: England
- Sovereign state: United Kingdom
- Post town: NORTH WALSHAM
- Postcode district: NR28
- Dialling code: 01692
- Police: Norfolk
- Fire: Norfolk
- Ambulance: East of England
- UK Parliament: North Norfolk

Felmingham is a village and civil parish in the English county of Norfolk.

Felmingham is located 2 miles (3.2 km) west of North Walsham and 13 miles (21 km) north of Norwich, along the B1145 between King's Lynn and Mundesley.

== History ==
Felmingham's name is of Anglo-Saxon origin and derives from the Old English for the homestead or village of Felma's people.

Nearby Stow Heath has evidence of Bronze Age round barrows and ring ditches at the confluence of the Skeyton and Blackwater Becks.

Within the parish, several Roman artefacts have been discovered including pottery remains, busts, figurines, coins and a rare cast for Iceni brooches, which points to the possible site of a Roman temple. The majority of the artefacts were found in 1844 and classified under the Felmingham Hoard, which was acquired by the British Museum in 1925.

In the Domesday Book, Felmingham is listed as a settlement of 33 households in the hundred of Tunstead. In 1086, the village was divided between the East Anglian estates of King William I, Roger Bigod and St Benet's Abbey.

During the Peasants' Revolt of 1381, a Felmingham dyer named Geoffrey Litster gathered a group of rebels and attempted to march on Norwich. The rebels were met by the forces of the crown, led by Henry le Despenser, Bishop of Norwich, at the Battle of North Walsham. Le Despenser crushed the rebel force and captured Litster and the ringleaders of the rebellion, who were subsequently executed by method of Hanged, drawn and quartered. The quarters of Litster were displayed in Norwich, Great Yarmouth, King's Lynn and Felmingham as a warning to the people.

Felmingham Hall was built in the late-Sixteenth Century and still stands today as a Grade II listed building. Ruggs Hall was also built in the Sixteenth Century but was demolished in the Nineteenth Century, with a farmhouse now standing on its original site.

The Kings Head pub opened in 1789. Throughout its history, the pub was supplied by the Coltishall Brewery, the Letheringsett Brewery, Morgan's Brewery and Bullard's Brewery. The pub closed in 1963.

Felmingham railway station opened in 1883 as a stop on the Midland and Great Northern Joint Railway stretch between Melton Constable and Yarmouth Beach. The station closed in 1959, with the railway infrastructure being diverted for residential use. The closest railway station to the village today is North Walsham for the Bittern Line.

During the Second World War, two B-24 Liberators of the United States Army Air Forces collided in mid-air above North Walsham. Both aircraft crashed within the parish, one on Bryant's Heath and another in Lord Anson's Wood.

== Geography ==
According to the 2021 census, Felmingham has a population of 517 people which shows a decrease from the 561 people recorded in the 2011 census.

Felmingham is situated along Weavers' Way, a 61 miles (98 km) footpath between Aylsham and Great Yarmouth. The footpath roughly follows the disused trackbed of the Aylsham-Yarmouth route of the Midland and Great Northern Joint Railway.

Felmingham is along the B1145, between King's Lynn and Mundesley.

== St. Andrew's Church ==
Felmingham's parish church is dedicated to Saint Andrew and was rebuilt in the Eighteenth Century on the site of an earlier church. St. Andrew's is located on Church Road, within the village, and has been Grade II listed since 1955.

The font is made from Purbeck Marble and the church features a brass monument to Robert Moone who died in 1591. St. Andrew's also features numerous examples of stained-glass windows with some salvaged from the demolished St. Philip's Church at Potter Heigham with further depictions of the Ascension and the Coronation of the Virgin installed by William Morris and Geoffrey Webb. St. Andrew's has a peal of nine bells in the belfry and a hand-carved screen commissioned for the Millennium depicting scenes from the New Testament.

== Bryant's Heath ==
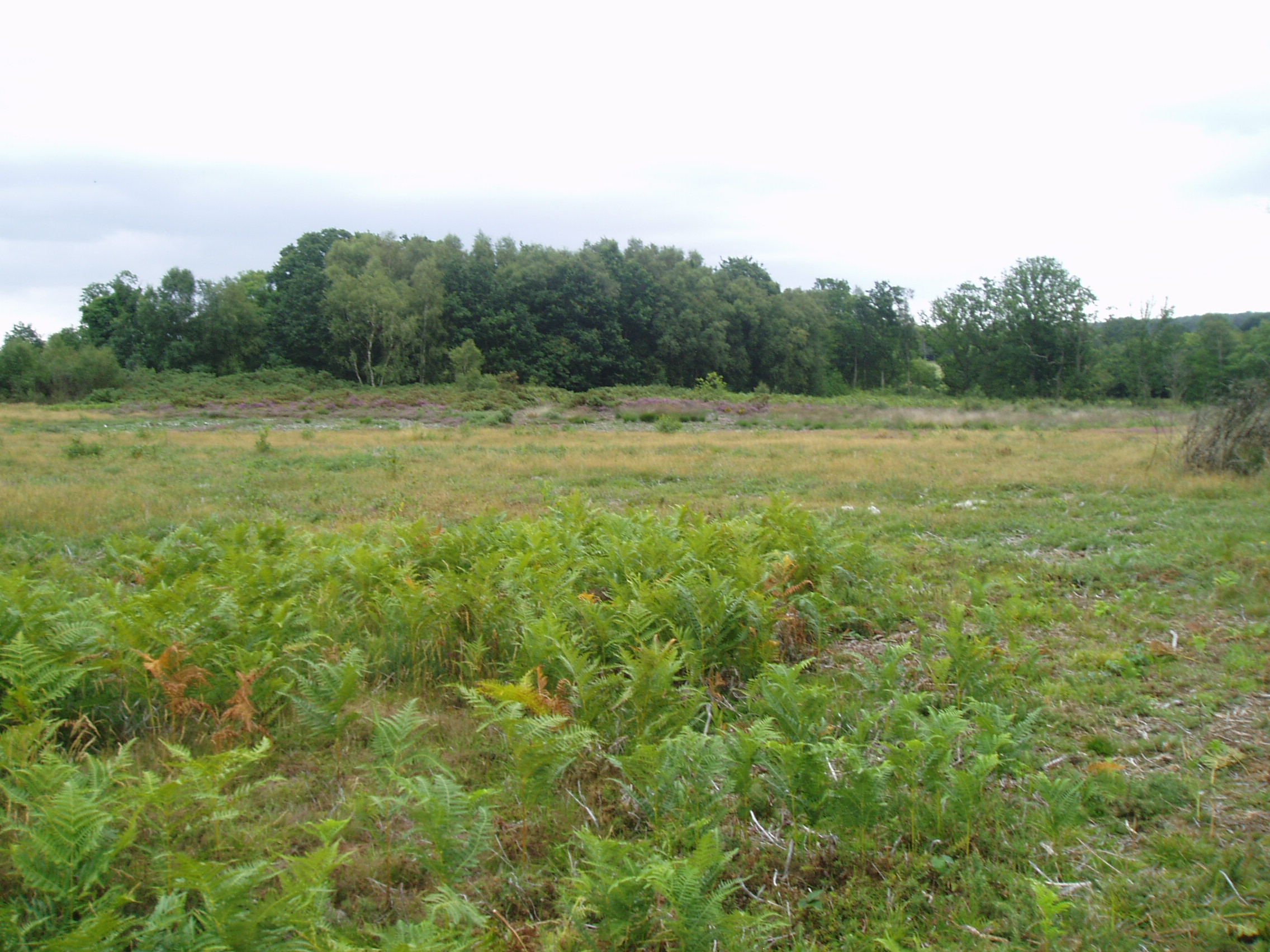
Bryant's Heath

Bryant's Heath is a nearby beauty spot and a designated Site of Special Scientific Interest. The heath is a good example of wet and dry heathland and fenland with a number of uncommon species of moss and lichen.

== Governance ==
Felmingham is part of the electoral ward of Trunch for local elections and is part of the district of North Norfolk. The civil parish has a parish council.

The village's national constituency is North Norfolk, which has been represented by the Liberal Democrat Steff Aquarone MP since 2024.

== War Memorial ==
Felmingham has two war memorials: a wooden board in St. Andrew's Church and a stone of remembrance in the churchyard which was created in 2018 by Nick Hindle and dedicated by Graham James, Bishop of Norwich. The memorial lists the following names for the First World War:

Rank	Name	Unit	Date of death	Burial/Commemoration
Sgt.	Albert J. Whitwood	8th Bn., Norfolk Regiment	1 Jul. 1916	Thiepval Memorial
Pte.	James E. Self	2nd Bn., The Buffs	14 May 1917	Struma Cemetery
Pte.	Herbert E. Self	8th Bn., East Surrey Regiment	8 Aug. 1918	Vignacourt Cemetery
Pte.	Frederick Buck	1st Bn., Essex Regiment	4 Dec. 1915	Azmak Cemetery
Pte.	Frederick Self	1st Bn., Norfolk Regiment	10 Oct. 1917	Godewaersvelde Cemetery
Pte.	Torrance A. Brett	9th Bn., Suffolk Regiment	24 Jun. 1917	Maroc British Cemetery

The memorial also lists the following names for the Second World War:

Rank	Name	Unit	Date of death	Burial/Commemoration
Sgt.	George W. Mount	No. 358 Squadron RAF	25 Feb. 1945	Sai Wan War Cemetery
LSgt.	Isaac J. Beales	5th Bn., Royal Norfolk Regiment	29 Mar. 1943	Kanchanaburi War Cemetery
Pte.	James H. Wright	1st Bn., Bedford and Hertford Regt.	6 Nov. 1942	Heliopolis War Cemetery
Pte.	Cecil F. Hall	5th Bn., Royal Norfolk Regiment	11 Mar. 1944	Yokohama War Cemetery
Pte.	Leonard J. Hicks	5th Bn., Royal Norfolks	1 Oct. 1939	St. Andrew's Churchyard
Pte.	John Daniels	4th Bn., Royal West Kent Regiment	3 Sep. 1942	Alamein Memorial
