= Bryant's Heath, Felmingham =

Site of Special Scientific Interest near North Walsham in Norfolk

Coordinates: 52.814°N 1.349°E

- Site of Special Scientific Interest
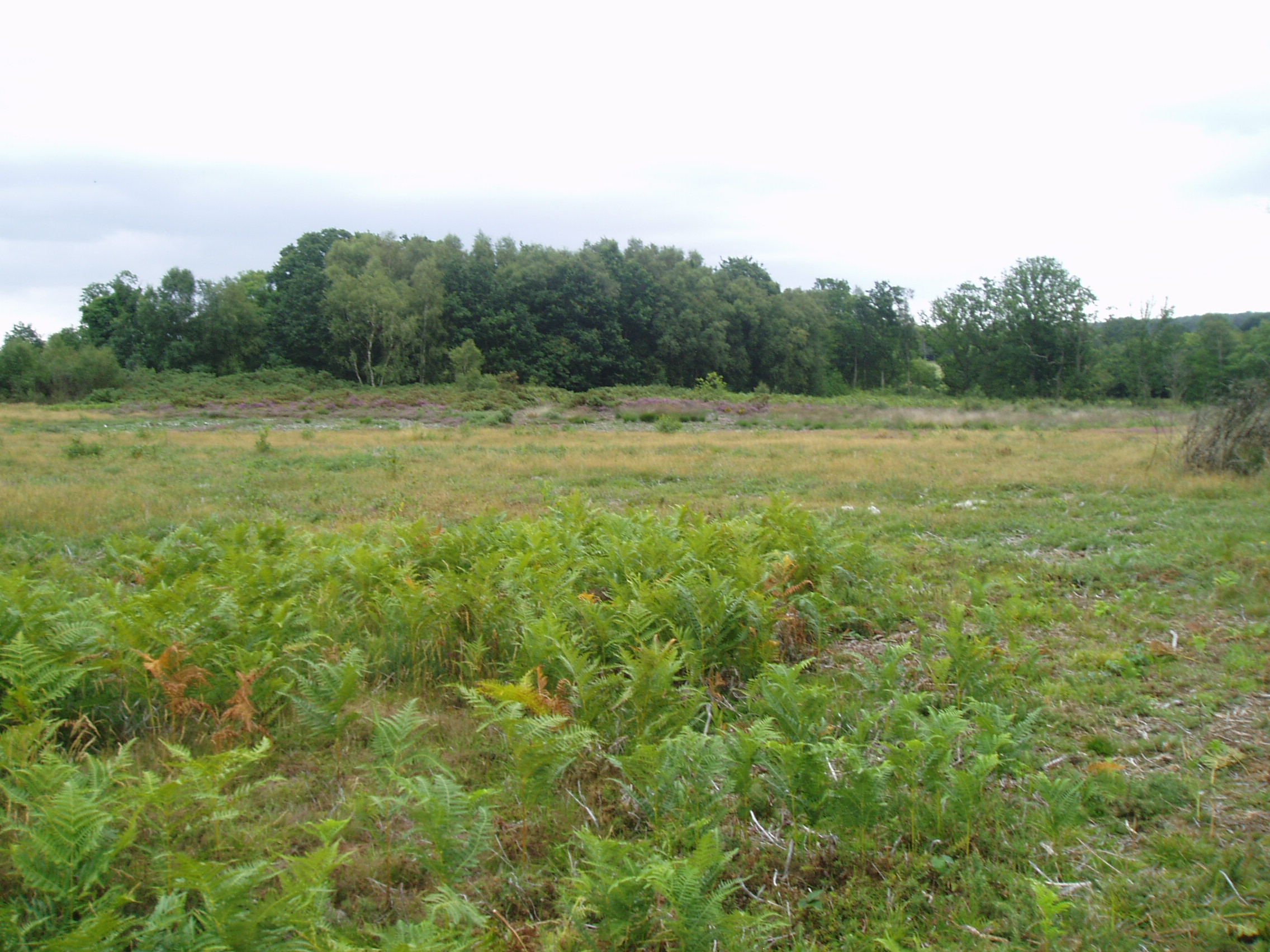
- Location of Bryant's Heath, Felmingham.
- Area of search: Norfolk
- Grid reference: TG 258 293
- Interest: Biological
- Area: 17.7 hectares (44 acres)
- Notification date: 1985
- Location map: Magic Map

Bryant's Heath, Felmingham is a 17.7-hectare (44-acre) biological Site of Special Scientific Interest west of North Walsham in Norfolk, England.

Most of this site is dry acidic heath on glacial sands, but there are also areas of wet heath, fen and carr woodland. Several unusual mosses and lichens have been recorded in wetter areas.

A public footpath between Felmingham and North Walsham goes through the heath.
