= Felmingham railway station =

Former railway station in Norfolk, England

Coordinates: 52.8083°N 1.3385°E

Felmingham
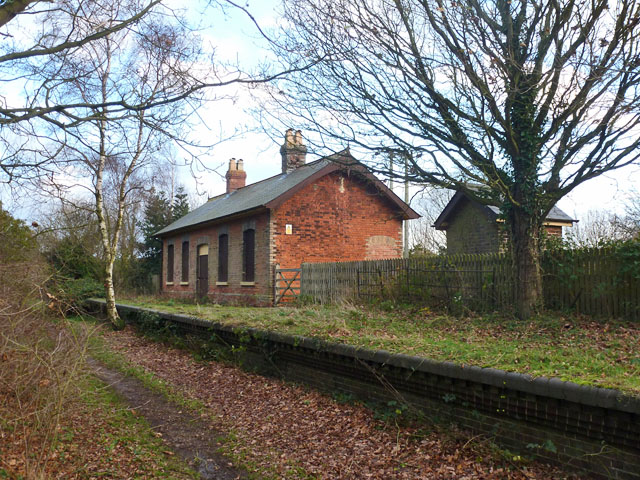
- The former Felmingham station, in 2013

General information
- Location: Felmingham, North Norfolk; England
- Grid reference: TG251286
- Platforms: 1

Other information
- Status: Disused

History
- Pre-grouping: Eastern & Midlands Railway; Midland and Great Northern Joint Railway
- Post-grouping: Midland and Great Northern Joint Railway; Eastern Region of British Railways

Key dates
- 5 April 1883: Opened
- 2 March 1959: Closed
Location

Felmingham railway station is a former railway station in Norfolk, England. It was closed in 1959. It served the village of Felmingham.

Former Services

Preceding station	Disused railways	Following station
Aylsham North	Midland and Great Northern; Yarmouth Line	North Walsham Town
