= Aylsham North railway station =

Former railway station in Norfolk, England

Coordinates: 52.80290°N 1.26079°E

Aylsham North
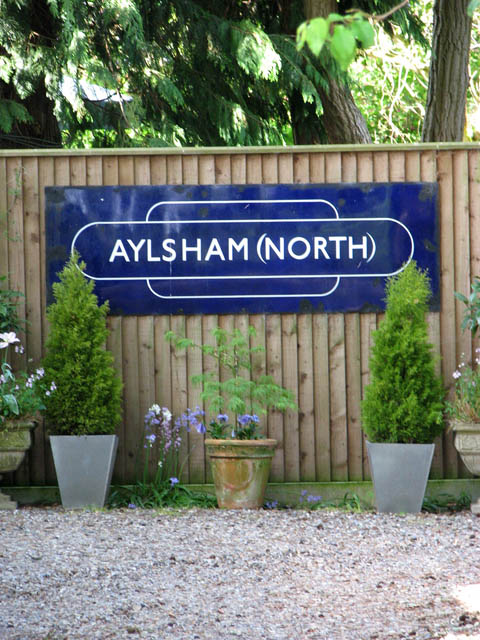
- The sign of the former station is now affixed to the fence of the house opposite the road

General information
- Location: Aylsham, Broadland; England
- Grid reference: TG199278
- Platforms: 2

Other information
- Status: Disused

History
- Pre-grouping: Eastern & Midlands Railway
- Post-grouping: Midland and Great Northern Joint Railway; Eastern Region of British Railways

Key dates
- 5 April 1883: Opened as Aylsham Town
- c.1902: Renamed Aylsham
- 27 September 1948: Renamed Aylsham North
- 2 March 1959: Closed
Location

Aylsham North (originally Aylsham Town and later known as Aylsham) was one of two railway stations in Aylsham, Norfolk, England; the other was Aylsham South. It was a stop on the Midland and Great Northern Joint Railway line from the Midlands to the Norfolk coast. It was closed in 1959, along with the rest of the line.

== History ==
Opened by the Eastern and Midlands Railway, Aylsham North became a Midland and Great Northern Joint Railway station. During the Grouping of 1923, it converted to a joint operation of the London, Midland and Scottish Railway and the London and North Eastern Railway, with the latter taking sole operation in 1936.

The station then passed on to the Eastern Region of British Railways upon nationalisation in 1948 and was closed by the British Transport Commission, along with the rest of the line, in 1959.

Preceding station	Disused railways	Following station
Bluestone	Midland and Great Northern; Yarmouth Line	Felmingham

== The site today ==
The station was demolished following its closure and is now a car park for the Weavers' Way; this footpath follows the old trackbed to Yarmouth.

The only remaining structure in the yard is the goods depot, which is visible from the road.

== See also ==
- List of closed railway stations in Norfolk
