= Battle of North Walsham =

Medieval battle in 1381, part of The Peasants' Revolt

- Part of The Peasants' Revolt
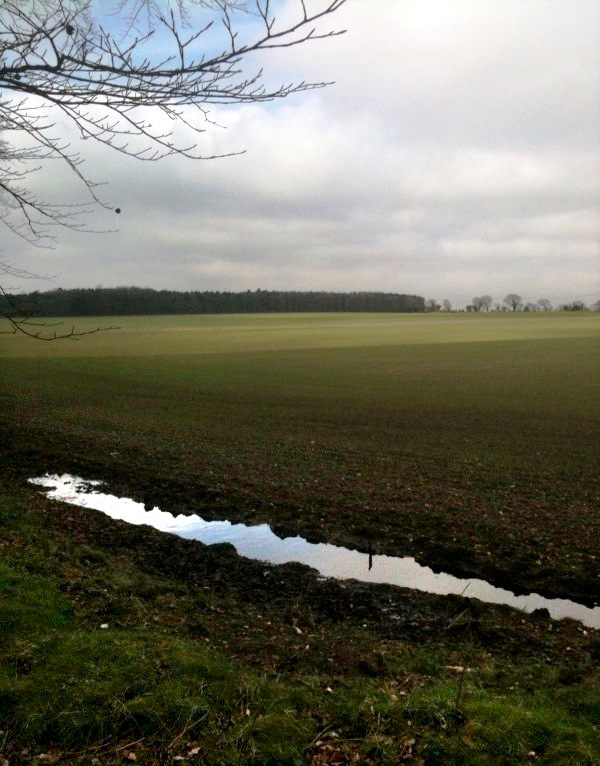
- The site of the Battle of North Walsham
Date	25 or 26 June 1381
Location	near North Walsham, Norfolk, England 52°48′15″N 01°22′21″E Grid reference TG277289
Result	Bishop of Norwich's forces' victory

Belligerents
Forces of the Bishop of Norwich	Local rebels from around the county of Norfolk

Commanders and leaders
Henry le Despenser	Geoffrey Litster of Felmingham

Strength
Unknown	Unknown

Casualties and losses
Unknown	Unknown

The Battle of North Walsham was a medieval battle fought on 25 or 26 June 1381, near the town of North Walsham in the English county of Norfolk, in which a large group of rebellious local peasants was confronted by the heavily armed forces of Henry le Despenser, Bishop of Norwich. The battle is significant for being the last occurrence of any major resistance during the English Peasants' Revolt.

Despenser succeeded in suppressing the rebellion that broke out throughout East Anglia that summer. His force at first consisted of his own retinue, but numbers swelled as aristocrats saw both his victories and the harsh retribution meted out to the rebels. He moved across East Anglia towards Norwich and then onwards to North Walsham to deal with the rebels, led by Geoffrey Litster, the so-called "King of the Commons". At North Walsham the rebels were decisively defeated by Despenser's men. Medieval chronicles differ in their accounts of exactly what happened at North Walsham. After the battle, Litster was captured and executed by Despenser, but the records of the time and subsequent histories disagree on the fate of his rebel army.

== Background ==
The Black Death played a key part in producing the conditions for the Peasants' Revolt. Fragment of a miniature from The Chronicles of Gilles Li Muisis (Bibliothèque royale de Belgique).

The Peasants' Revolt of 1381 was a major rebellion that spread throughout medieval England during the summer of that year. Its causes are complex. The drop in population caused by the Black Death, which arrived in England in 1348, resulted in an acute labour shortage and, consequently, higher wages. The Statute of Labourers (1351) (Note: See Dobson, pp. 63-68 for a complete translation of The Statute of Labourers (1351). Edward III's statutes and ordinances can be read in Sources of English Constitution History: A Selection (1932).) was a law enacted during the first parliament of Edward III, to make labour laws and their intended enforcement more precise and detailed, and also to allow the government to control wages. It had the effect of making life harsher for the peasants, but more profitable for the wealthy landowners. Further discontent erupted from the behaviour of those nobles who ruled on behalf of the boy-king Richard II, and also from the position of the Church; as many priests were ill-educated, and the bishops and abbots themselves were landowners, it was generally hated by the common people. Feelings were stirred up by rebellious priests such as John Ball, who criticised the Church wherever the common people flocked to him to listen to his words. (Note: Dobson, p. 369, chapters 69 to 70 in Dobson's The Peasants' Revolt of 1381 contain Froissart's account of the actions of 'the foolish priest' John Ball and Thomas Walsingham's account of Ball from the Historia Anglicana.)

The revolt began in Essex, following the introduction of a succession of highly unpopular poll taxes levied against the population. In 1377 the expense of the Hundred Years' War had caused the government to introduce a poll tax of four pence. By 1380 this had tripled, but as many refused to pay, revenues dropped. The imposition of a third poll tax in 1381 prompted unrest in Essex and Kent, which then spread all over England. According to the Anonimalle Chronicle, the "evil actions" of the commons in both Essex and Kent were "because of the exceptionally severe tenths and fifteenths and other subsidies lightly conceded in parliaments and extortionately levied from the poor people". Most serious of all were events that occurred in London on 13–15 June. During the summer, rebels from Kent and Essex marched to London and, once admitted to the city, managed to capture the Tower of London. Richard, who had promised to agree to all the demands of the peasants, met the rebels outside the city, where the peasants' leader, Wat Tyler, was killed and the rebellion there was ended. Once they were defeated it became clear to the rebels that they had failed to gain Richard's support. Whilst the King was at Waltham, in Essex, a proclamation was issued condemning the rebels and denying that he had ever approved of their actions. At Waltham, Richard refused to ratify the promises he made, as he believed they had been extorted by force, adding, "Villeins ye are still, and villeins ye shall remain", and threatening vengeance upon those who had rebelled.

The rebellions in Essex, Kent and London spread to other English counties. In Norfolk, the rebellion started on 14 June, when a group of rebels from Suffolk reached the county, and spread westwards towards the Fens and north-eastwards towards Norwich and Yarmouth. As in other parts of the country there was widespread unrest, during which property and official documents were destroyed and several individuals were summarily executed.

== Leaders ==
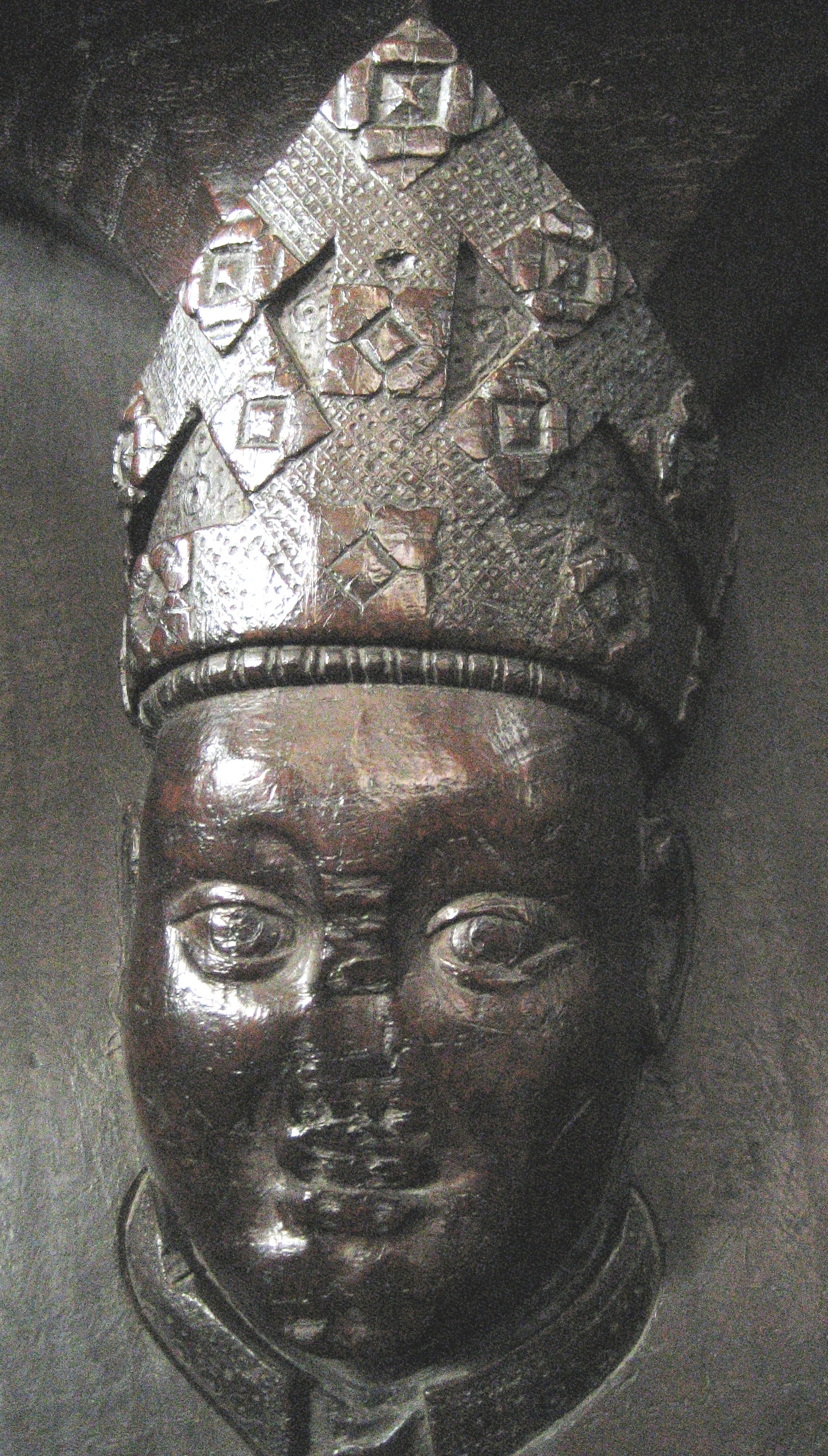
Henry le Despenser, the "Fighting Bishop", depicted on a misericord in King's Lynn Minster

Henry le Despenser (c. 1341–1406) was an English nobleman who as a young man had been a soldier in Italy, and who in 1370 became Bishop of Norwich. He obtained a reputation as the "Fighting Bishop" after playing his part in suppressing the Norfolk rebels during the Peasants' Revolt, and later embarking on an ill-fated enterprise for Pope Urban VI, who in 1382 employed him to lead a crusade in Flanders against the supporters of the anti-pope Clement VII. For his defeat at the siege of Ypres (1383), Despenser was impeached in Parliament, attainted and deprived of his lands. He later regained his lands and favour with the King. In 1399 Henry Bolingbroke landed at Ravenspur in Yorkshire and the military campaign that followed resulted in Richard's abdication. Despenser remained true to Richard; he was imprisoned but was afterwards reconciled with the new king. Despenser died in his diocese at North Elmham on 23 August 1406.

Little is known of Geoffrey Litster (also named by medieval chroniclers as Iohanne Lyttestere and Jekke Litster), a moderately wealthy dyer from the village of Felmingham in Norfolk. He is first recorded in the returns made by the collectors of the 1379 poll tax in Norfolk. (Note: An edited version of the returns records from 1379 has been published by the Oxford University Press, edited by C. Fenwick.) As peasants, he and his men would have been untrained and unequipped to fight Despenser's fully armed force. Litster was captured after the battle and executed soon afterwards at North Walsham.

== Events in Norfolk before the battle ==
During the summer of 1381, insurrection spread from the south-east of England to other parts the country, including the diocese of Norwich, where the rebellion lasted less than a fortnight. On 14 June a group of rebels reached Thetford, and from there the revolt spread over south-western Norfolk towards the Fens. At the same time, men led by Geoffrey Litster moved across the north-eastern part of the county and tried to raise support throughout the local area. Over the next few days, the rebels converged on Norwich, Lynn and Swaffham. Norwich, then one of the largest and most important cities in the realm, was taken and occupied by Litster and his followers, who destroyed the property of anyone perceived as an enemy (such as poll tax collectors and important officials). The Norwich rebels then travelled to Yarmouth, destroying legal records and landowners' possessions, while other insurgents moving across north-east Norfolk destroyed court rolls and taxation documents. There were numerous incidents of pillage and extortion across the county.

The Anonimalle Chronicle provides a clear account of the unrest in East Anglia. On hearing of the rebellion, Despenser acted swiftly, moving through Cambridgeshire, Suffolk and Norfolk from his home in Burley, Rutland. His armed force initially consisted of his personal retinue, but grew as he was joined by knights and other men who had previously not dared to confront the rebels. According to the historian Edgar Powell, Dispenser undertook the task of dealing with the revolt in his diocese and punishing the rebels. He was involved in crushing rebellions at Peterborough and elsewhere, before moving on to suppress the revolts in Cambridge. The authorities were alerted to the call in Norfolk for men to join Litster's rebellion. On 17 June rebels from the north and east of the county assembled on Mousehold Heath outside Norwich: shortly afterwards, Sir Robert Salle, who had come out of the city to speak with the commons, was killed. According to Walsingham, the knight died soon after he was "knocked on the head by a rustic who was one of his own serfs". The rebels then entered Norwich and wreaked havoc, destroying property and killing prominent citizens. Other houses and church properties within the county (such as at Yarmouth) were attacked by the rebels at this time.

Litster was at Thorpe Market on 21 June and by the next day Despenser had reached nearby Felmingham. Hearing that the rebels were close, Despenser travelled the short distance from Felmingham to North Walsham Heath, where he encountered Litster and his men.

== Battle and aftermath ==
The Battle of North Walsham (1381)

There are no eyewitness accounts of the battle that was fought at North Walsham on 25 or 26 June 1381. The contemporary chronicler Thomas Walsingham related that there was a fierce engagement at North Walsham Heath, south of the town, in which "the warlike Bishop" led a successful attack on the rebels' entrenched position. The Escheators' Inquisitions for the period that name Litster also included the names of rebels from North Walsham who were killed, giving strong evidence that the rebels suffered a severe defeat. (Note: According to Réville: 'Powell found this version more probable than Walsingham's. In his view, Capgrave, born in Lynn (1393) and educated at Cambridge, must have known the truth, and his version explains the silence of the court documents on the case of North Walsham. Powell did not pay attention to documents that support Walsingham and those, like Reville, who agreed with his version of events. These Escheators' Inquisitions, Norfolk and Suffolk, 5-6 Ric. II, memb. 12, where confiscated property is assessed on Lystere Geoffrey, beheaded, and a number of rebels killed following the uprising, include residents of North Walsham. These people of North Walsham were not sentenced under a judicial sentence, but killed, and listed in the indictments alongside Geoffrey Lystere, obviously perished in the battle as told by Walsingham.') According to Walsingham, the rebels were routed as they fled through woodland and cut down as they were found. Writing in the 19th century, Walter Rye quoted a local man, "They dew say a'mazin' lot of men are buried in that pightle". (Note: Pightle = A small field or enclosure; a paddock, a close. ("pightle, n.". Oxford English Dictionary Online. November 2010. Oxford University Press. (accessed 25 December 2010).) (Note: The scene of the massacre, and possibly of Litester's execution, was on the Norwich side of North Walsham, whither, no doubt, most of the rebels were driven out by the Bishop's rush from the Antingham side of the town. The shaft of a stone cross still stands in the crook of the road to mark the spot. "They dew say a 'mazin' lot of men are buried in that pightle,' as a rustic told me once." (Rye, W., A Popular History of the County of Norfolk, p. 55 (Stock, 1885))) The local belief that the parish church at North Walsham was the scene of a bloodbath after the battle cannot be substantiated using historical documents. Many sources of information tell of a massacre in North Walsham, in Chase's account of events: 'The rebels ... fled in confusion back to the town, many seeking refuge in the church which, perhaps, they had helped to build. The wayside cross ... is said to mark the spot where the battle was fought. There are the remains of two other crosses on the supposed battle site, which was then all heath. Bishop Le Spencer followed the rebels, and slew all who were captured, showing no respect for the sanctuary to which they had retreated.

According to The Book of Illustrious Henries, written by the 15th-century historian John Capgrave, very little fighting took place. The chronicler related that, "But by the good management of the bishop, and of other men who had assembled there, the whole people surrendered, rejoicing that they might withdraw in peace. Jack Litster himself, leaping over a wall, hid himself in a corn-field".

Inevitably the rebels' "king" was found. Walsingham and Capgrave agree that after Geoffrey Litster's capture, he was taken to North Walsham and was there drawn, hanged and quartered. According to Capgrave's chronicle, "The traitor was sought and found; he was captured and beheaded; and, divided into four parts, he was sent through the country to Norwich, Yarmouth, and Lynn, and to the site of his mansion; that rebels and insurgents against the peace might learn by what end they will finish their career". Walsingham wrote an account of the mercy shown by the bishop to Litster during his execution: "After hearing his confession and absolving him by virtue of his office, he followed him to the gallows, showing, although he had overcome him, a deed of kindness and piety, for he supported his head lest it should be bruised by the ground when he was being drawn to the hanging".

Litster's widow Agnes was later pursued by the authorities and was made to settle his outstanding debts (for the sum of 33 shillings and nine pence).

== Commemoration of the battle ==
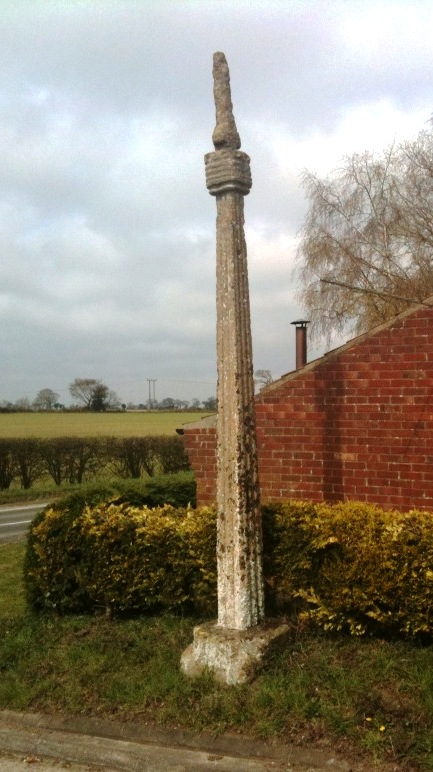
One of three medieval crosses near the site of the battle.

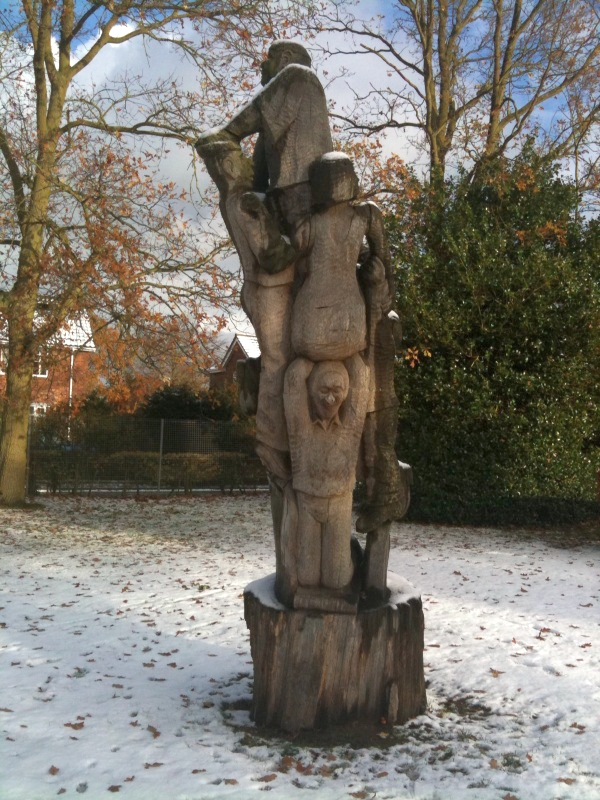
A modern sculpture in North Walsham, commemorating the Peasants' Revolt

The site of the battle is one of only five battlefields in Norfolk that are recognised by Norfolk County Council. The battle was commemorated by three medieval stone crosses: one is on private land; another (now a stump) was relocated by North Walsham Urban District Council in 1932 and can be found near the roadside by the town's water towers; the third cross (illustrated) was moved and used as a parish boundary marker. It is situated on Heath Road, off Norwich Road.

A sculpture in the Memorial Park, North Walsham, carved in 1999 by Mark Goldsworthy from the trunk of a 120-year-old oak tree, commemorates the 1381 battle.

North Walsham's town sign contains a mosaic depicting the Peasants' Revolt.

An over-the-top re-enactment of the battle appears in the second episode of This Time with Alan Partridge.

== Sources ==
- Capgrave, John; Hingeston, F. C. (1858). The Book of Illustrious Henries.
- Chase, F. A., (early 20th century) The story of St. Nicholas Church, North Walsham
- Dobson, R. B. (1970). The peasants' revolt of 1381. MacMillan. ISBN 978-0-333-09139-5.
- Oman, Charles (1906). The Great Revolt of 1381 (PDF). Clarendon Press. Archived from the original (PDF) on 10 June 2011.
- Powell, Edgar (1896). The Rising in East Anglia in 1381. Cambridge University Press.
- Réville, André (2009). Le soulèvement des travaileurs d'Angleterre en 1381 : études et documents publiés (in English). BiblioBazaar. ISBN 978-1-113-79318-8.
- Stephenson, Carl; Marcham, Frederick George (1932). Sources Of English Constitutional History A Selection Of Documents Form A.D.600 To The Present. New York: Harper and Row. OCLC 38112018.
- Walsingham, Thomas (2011). Taylor, J.; Childs, W. R.; Watkiss, L. (eds.). The St Albans Chronicle: The Chronica Maiora of Thomas Walsingham Volume I 1376-1394. Oxford University Press. ISBN 978-0-19-820471-8.
