= Benedictine Priory, King's Lynn =

Monastery in Norfolk, England

Coordinates: 52.7514°N 0.3954°E

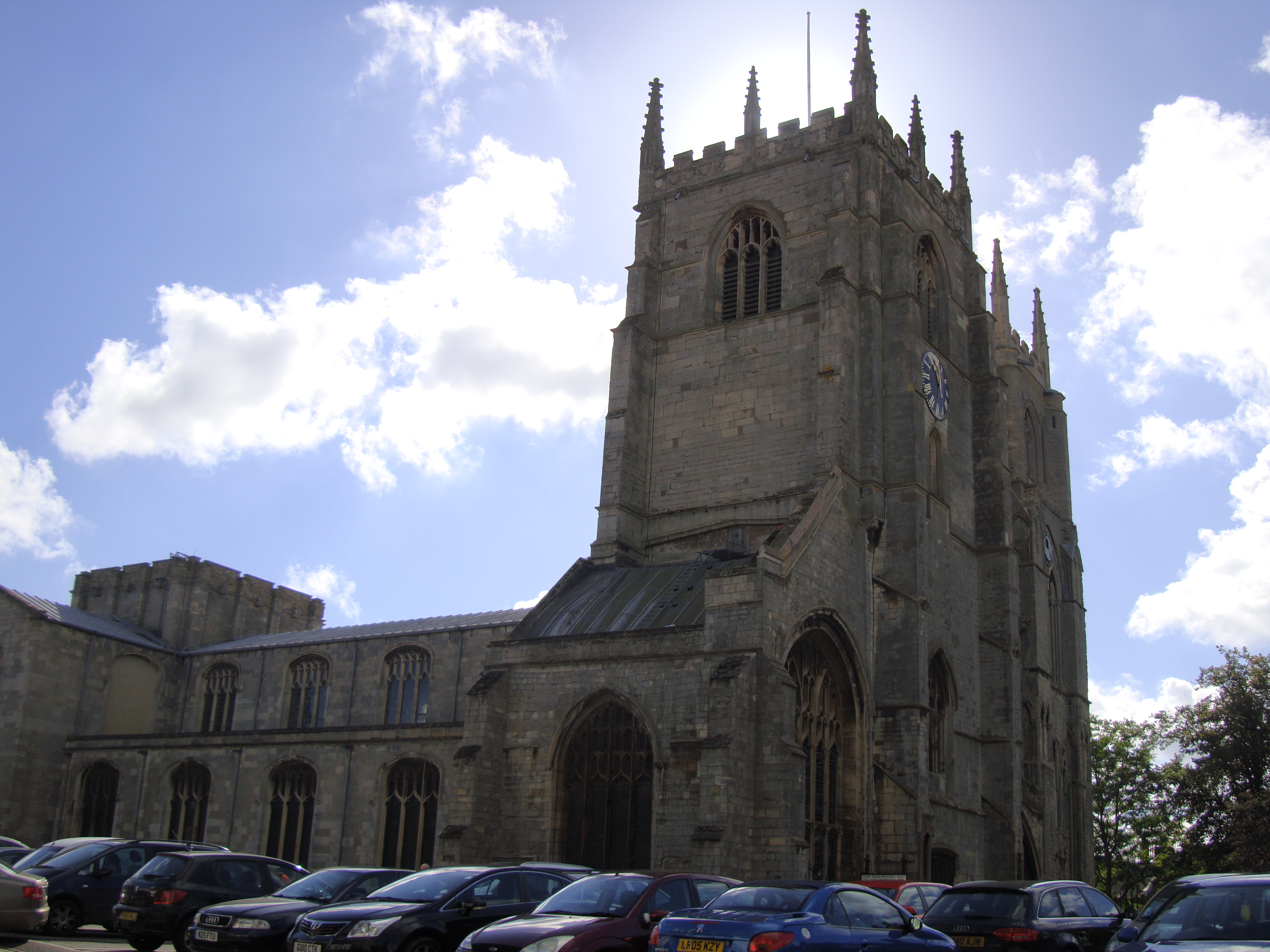
Minster Church, King's Lynn, former Benedictine priory church

The Benedictine Priory, King's Lynn, was a medieval monastery in Norfolk, England. It was founded in 1100 in King's Lynn by Herbert de Losinga, bishop of Norwich, as a small monastic house supporting the church of St Margaret founded at the same time. Its rents and profits were remitted for the use of the priory of the Holy Trinity which served Norwich Cathedral, also founded around the same time by Bishop Herbert. The priory at King's Lynn was lucrative for many years but towards the end of its existence the income from it had fallen to less than the cost of maintaining it.

The priory was dissolved in 1537. St. Margaret's Church remains as King's Lynn Minster but nothing survives of the priory buildings except for a short length of wall.

== See also ==
- List of monastic houses in Norfolk
