= South Elmham Hall =

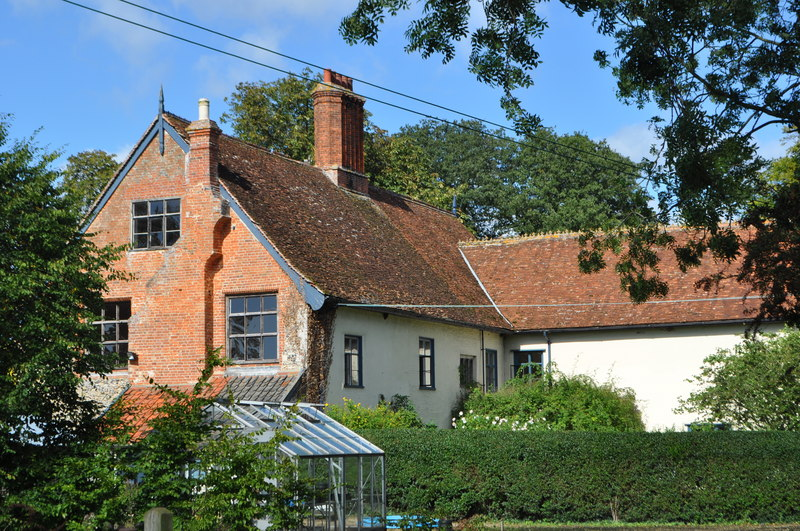

- Location within Suffolk
- 52.398298°N 1.3898567°E
- Location: St Cross South Elmham, Suffolk, England

Listed Building – Grade I
- Official name: South Elmham Hall
- Designated: 1 September 1953
- Reference no.: 1031966

South Elmham Hall is a former Bishop's palace located in St Cross, South Elmham, Suffolk, England. It is a moated site which includes some ruins dating from the 13th and 14th centuries. However the main extant building is a 16th century manor house with some alterations from the 17th and 19th centuries. On 1 September 1953 it became a Grade I listed building.

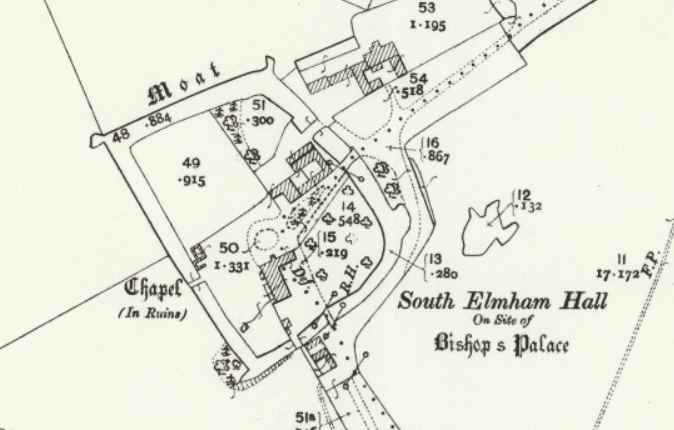
Plan of building from OS map, 1904

South Elmham Hall dates from a later period than that of the Bishops of Elmham (672-1075 AD).
