= Liverpool Naval Memorial =

War memorial in England

Coordinates: 53°24′13″N 2°59′48″W

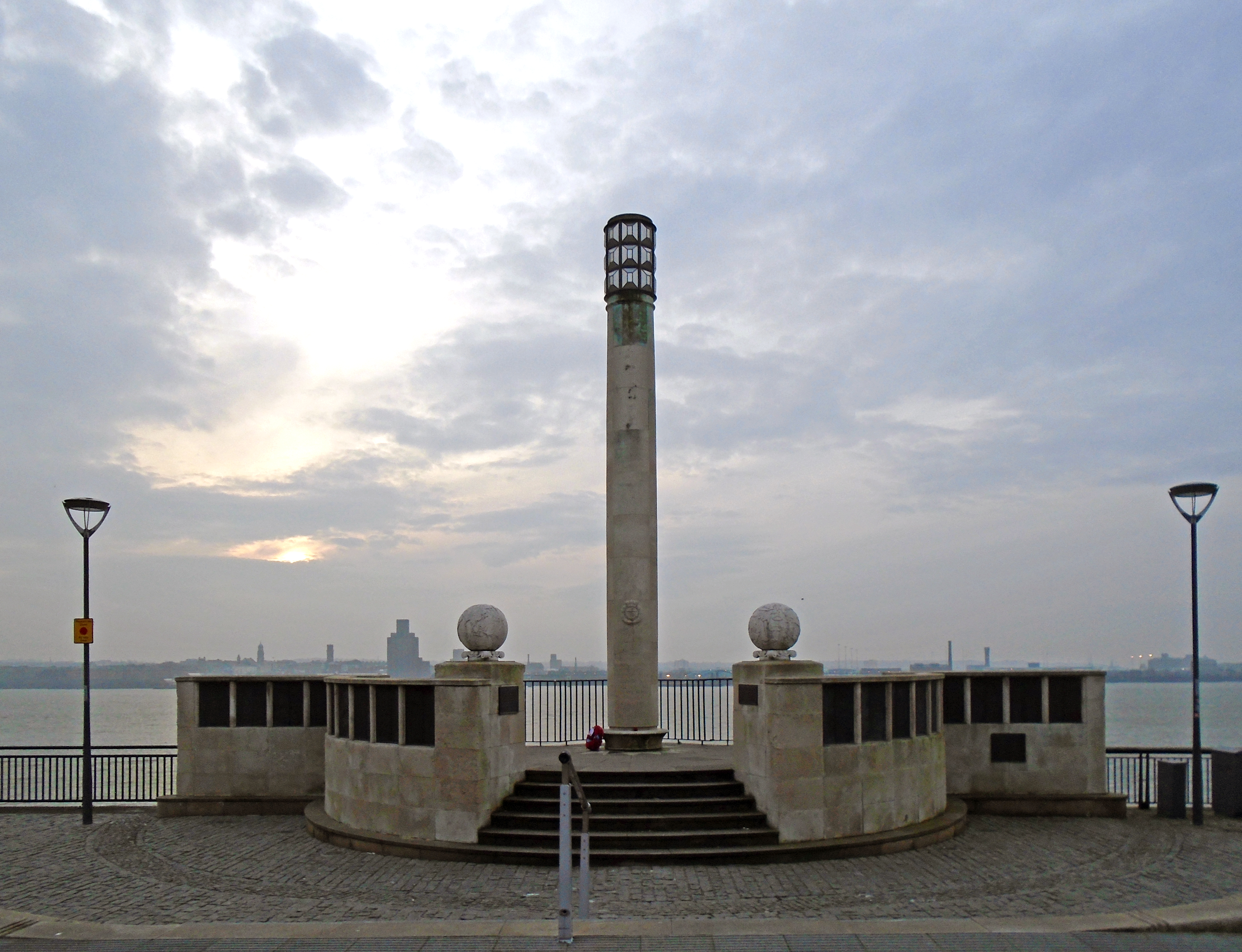
Liverpool Naval Memorial

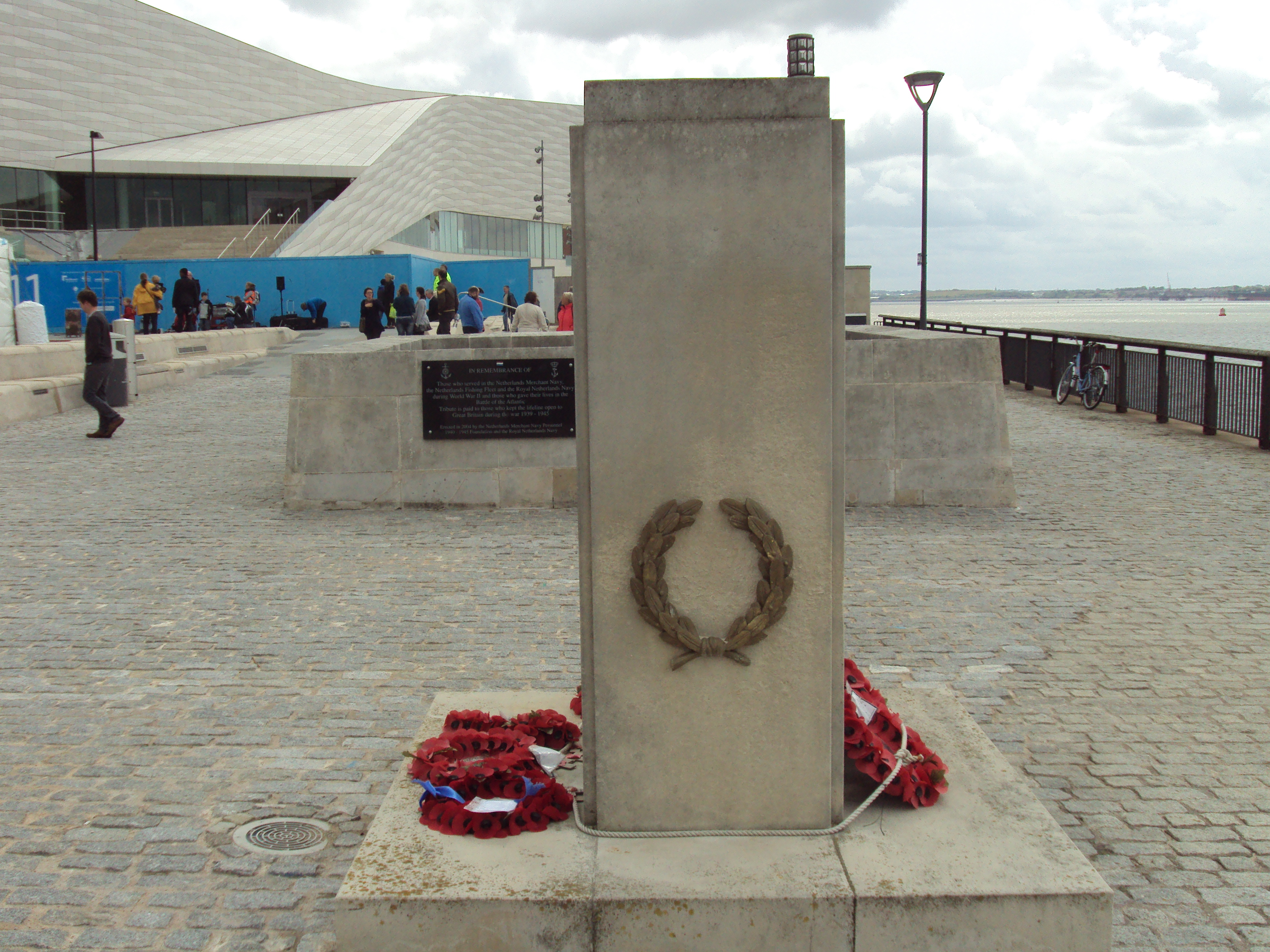
Merchant Navy Memorial, with the memorial plinth and plaques behind, and the lantern of the Liverpool Naval Memorial beyond

The Liverpool Naval Memorial, also known as the Memorial to the Missing of the Naval Auxiliary Personnel of the Second World War or the Merchant Navy War Memorial, is a war memorial at Pier Head beside the River Mersey in Liverpool, near to the Royal Liver Building and the Museum of Liverpool. It commemorates nearly 1,400 men from the British Merchant Navy who died on active service with Royal Navy in the Second World War, and who have no known grave.

More than 13,000 officers and seamen of the Merchant Navy agreed to serve with the Royal Navy in the Second World War, serving mainly in auxiliary vessels such as armed merchant cruisers, subject to military discipline but still receiving civilian pay. The depot for registration and administration of the naval auxiliaries from the Merchant Navy was established at Liverpool.

After the Second World War, the Imperial War Graves Commission (later the Commonwealth War Graves Commission) organised a competition for a memorial, with a budget of £5,000, open to architects who had served in the armed forces. The winning design was created by architects Charles Frederick Blythin and Stanley Harold Smith, with sculpture by George Herbert Tyson Smith. It was unveiled by Admiral of the Fleet Viscount Cunningham of Hyndhope on 12 November 1952.

The memorial comprises a narrow cylindrical column of Portland stone topped by a glazed lantern, which has glass lenses with a reflective backing intended to resemble a lighthouse, which stands on a semicircular Portland stone platform surrounded by curved walls. The platform is reached by flight of six steps, and the walls support a pair of stone globes, one terrestrial and one celestial. The memorial bears the inscription "These officers and men of the Merchant Navy died while serving with the Royal Navy and have no grave but the sea 1939–1945". The names of the dead are inscribed on 25 bronze plaques arranged around the curved Portland stone walls of the memorial. It became a Grade II listed building in 2010.

Among several other memorials at Pier Head are memorials to seamen from Norway, Poland, China, the Netherlands and Belgium who served in the Second World War, and a memorial dedicated to the Merchant Navy unveiled in 1998. There is a proposal to erect a large Battle of the Atlantic memorial nearby. Merchant seamen lost at sea in the First and Second World Wars are also commemorated by the Merchant Navy Memorial at Tower Hill in London.

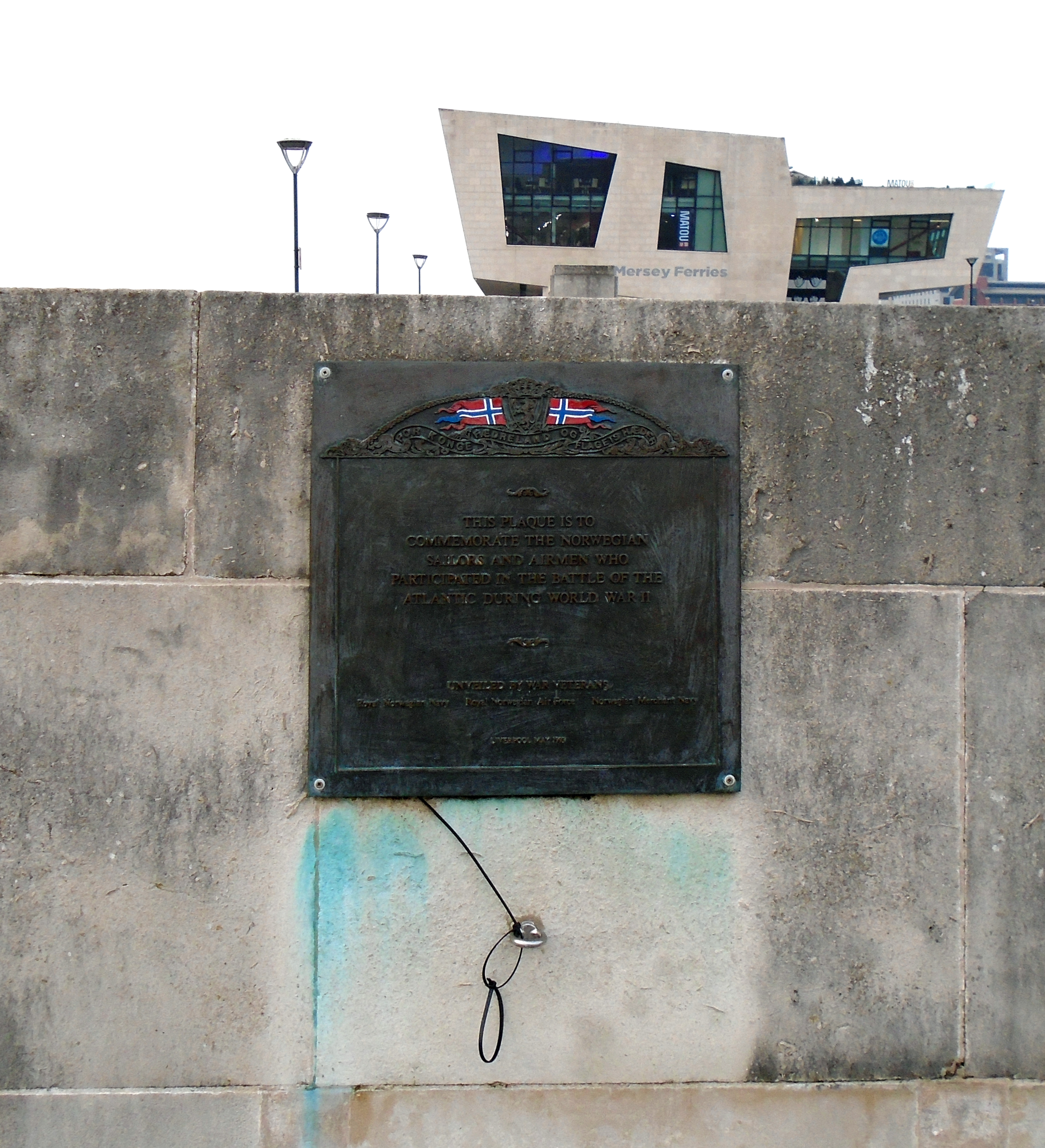
Norway

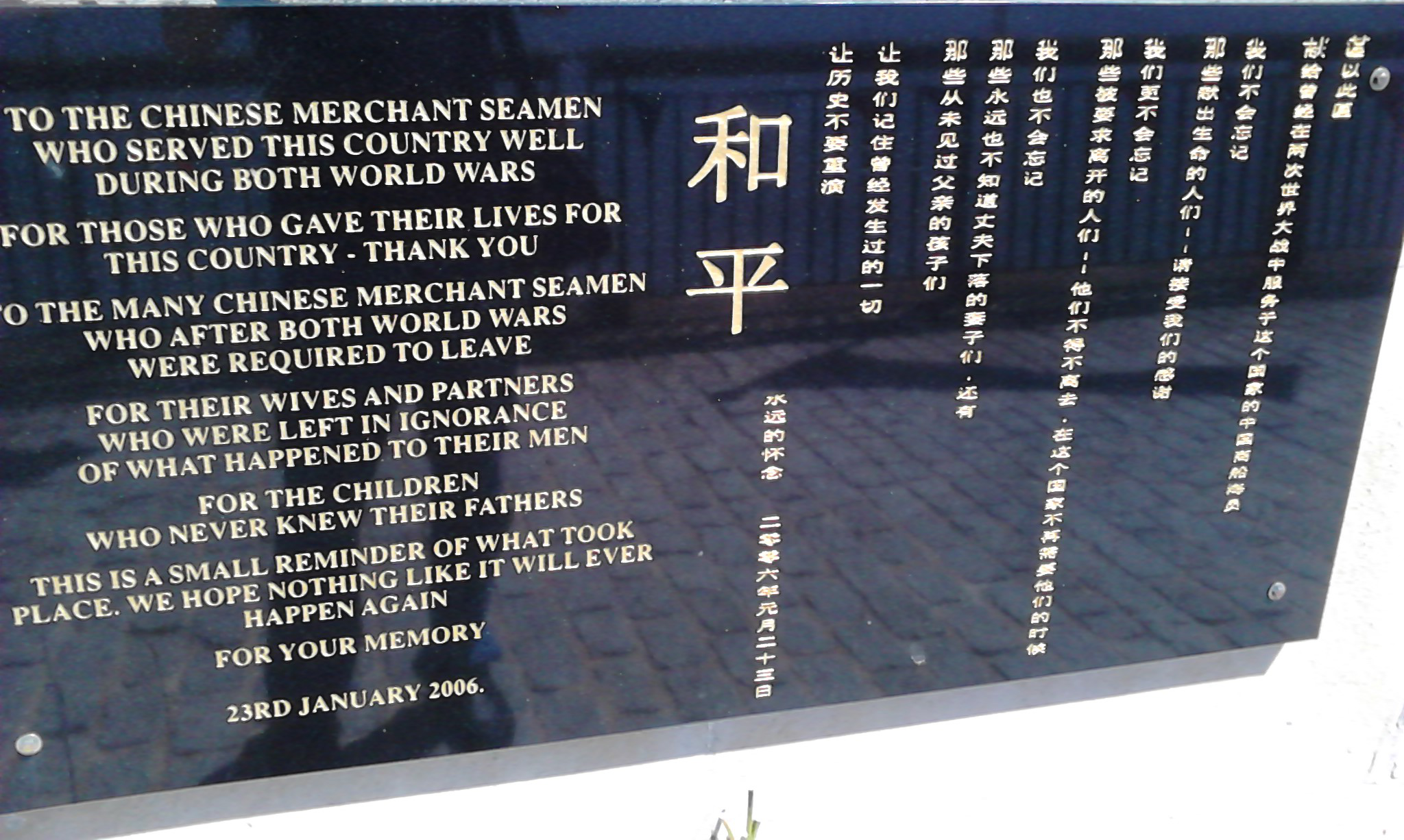
China

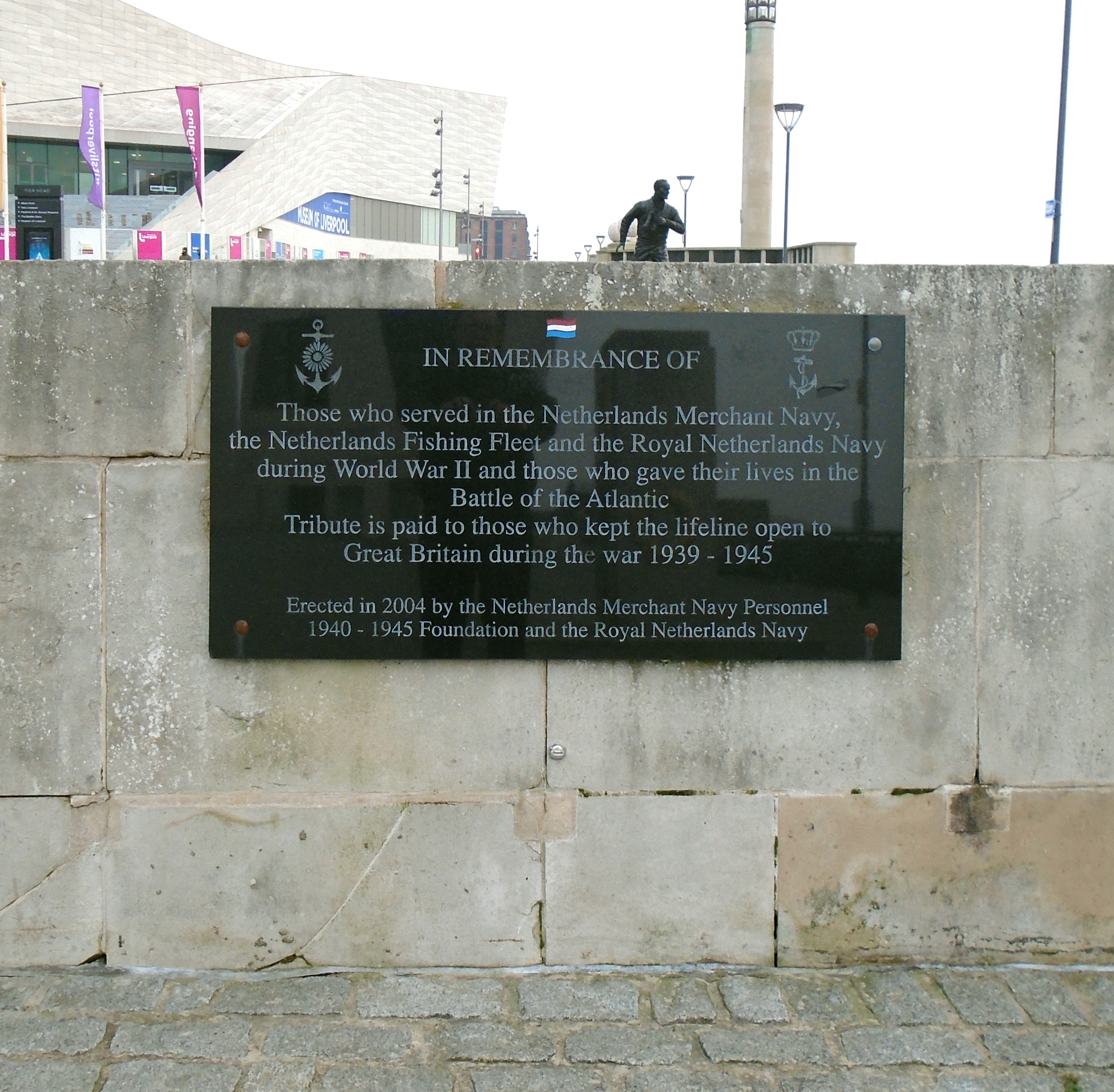
Netherlands

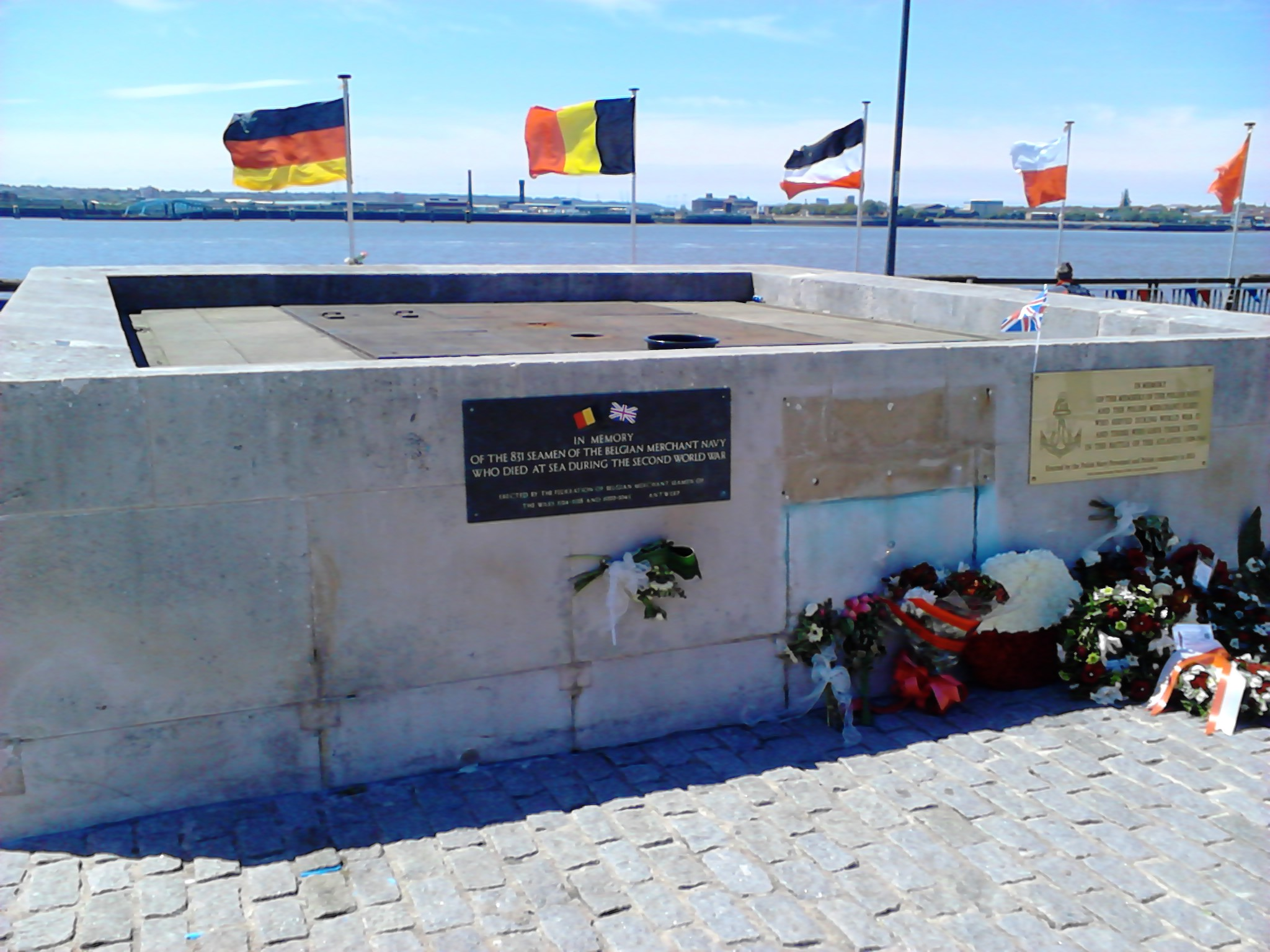
Belgium and Poland

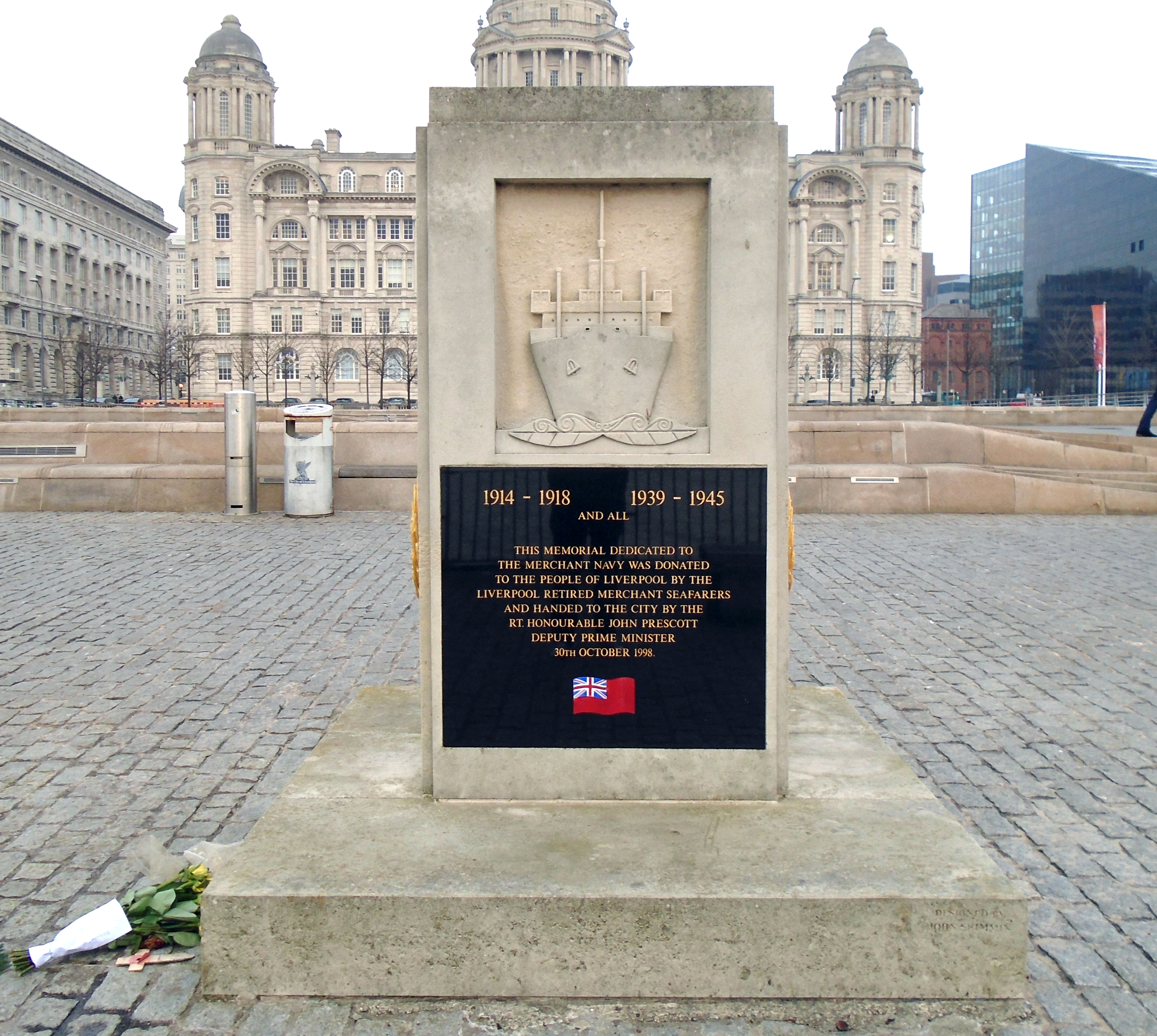
Merchant Navy Memorial
