= Azmak Commonwealth War Graves Commission Cemetery =

CWGC war cemetery in Turkey

Azmak
- Commonwealth War Graves Commission
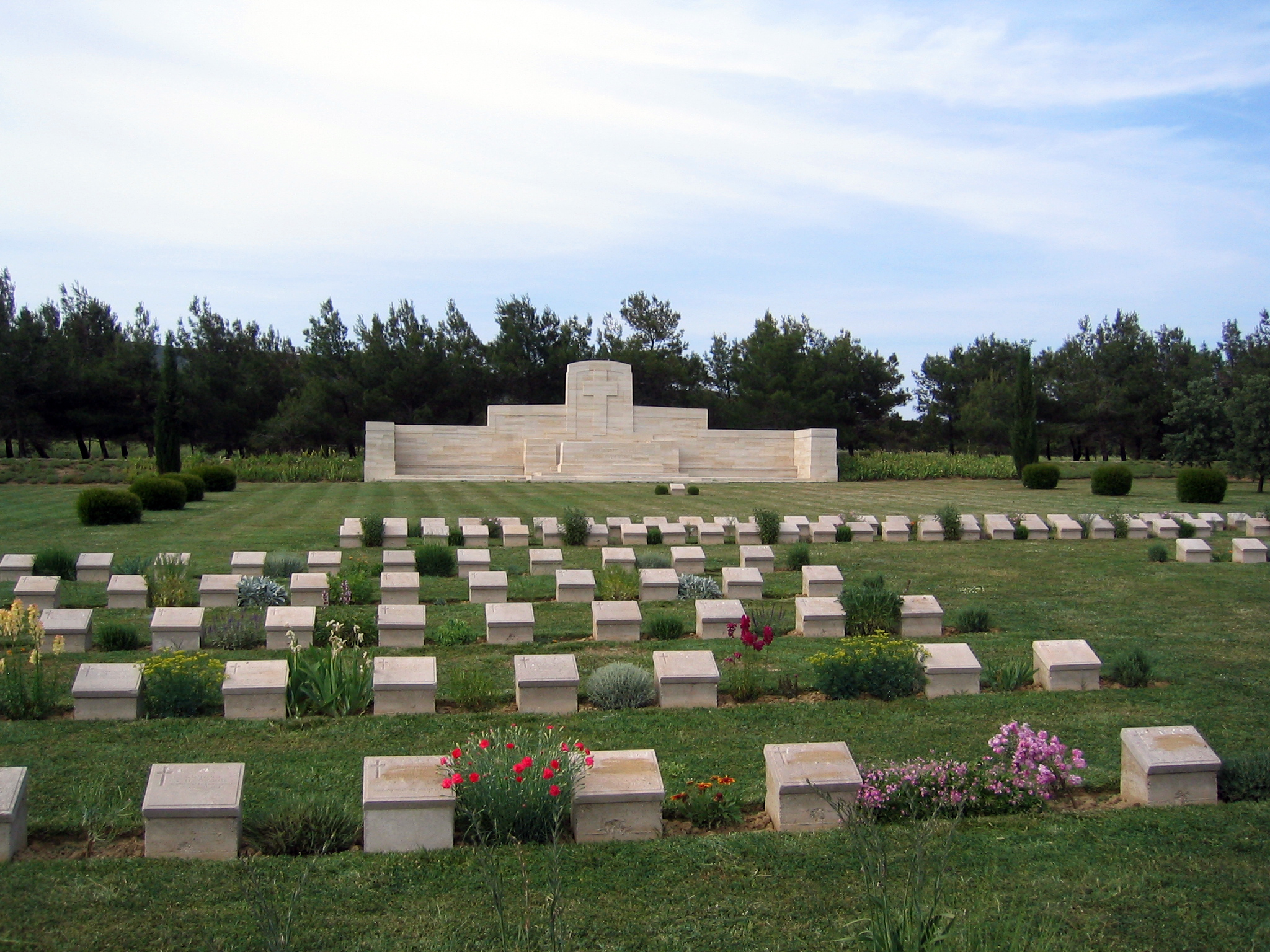
- Used for those deceased August–December 1915
- Established: 1920
- Location: 40.321074°N 26.271021°E near Gallipoli, Turkey
- Total burials: 1,074
- Unknowns: 684

Burials by nation
- Allied Powers: Australian: 25; British: 562; Newfoundland: 12

Burials by war
- World War I: 1,074

Azmak Cemetery near Suvla Bay, Gallipoli, Turkey was constructed shortly after the end of the First World War by the Commonwealth War Graves Commission and filled with graves brought in from small cemeteries and sites around it. It is on the south side of Azmak Dere, from which it takes its name, a small ravine which runs into the salt lake at Suvla Bay. Special memorials record the names of 53 British and 3 Newfoundland soldiers buried in the cemetery but whose graves are not positively identified.

== Notable graves ==
Amongst the graves are 115 men of the 1/5th (Territorial) Battalion of the Norfolk Regiment, of which the names of only two are known. The battalion, which included a company recruited from workers from the Sandringham House Royal estate, suffered heavy losses on 12 August 1915 and a myth grew up that the unit had advanced into a mist and simply disappeared. However the remains of many of them were found after the Armistice and interred in the cemetery. In 1999 a TV film, All the King's Men was made about the incident.
