= King's Lynn Minster =

Medieval minster in Norfolk

Coordinates: 52°45′5.12″N 0°23′43.59″E

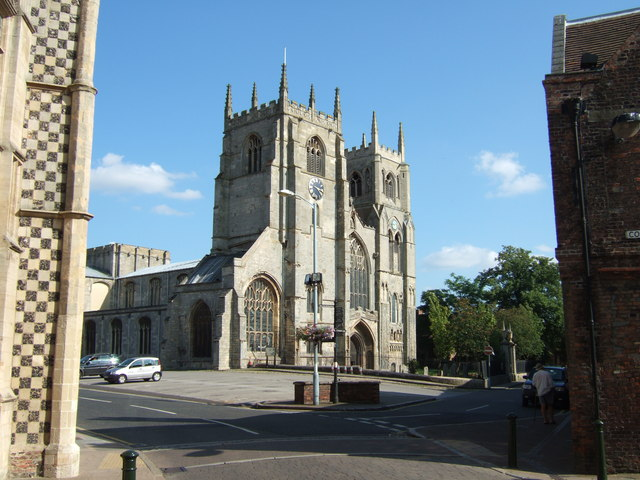
- King's Lynn Minster
- King's Lynn Minster
- OS grid reference: TF 61772 19806
- Location: King's Lynn
- Country: England
- Denomination: Church of England
- Previous denomination: Roman Catholic
- Website: stmargaretskingslynn.org.uk

History
- Former name(s): St Margaret's Parish Church, King's Lynn
- Dedication: St Margaret of Antioch

Architecture
- Heritage designation: Grade I listed
- Groundbreaking: 1095

Administration
- Diocese: Diocese of Norwich
- Archdeaconry: Lynn
- Deanery: Lynn
- Parish: St Margaret with St Nicholas and St Edmund, King's Lynn

Clergy
- Rector: Rev Canon Dr Mark Dimond

Listed Building – Grade I
- Official name: Church of St Margaret, Saturday Market Place
- Designated: 1 December 1951
- Reference no.: 1211336

St Margaret's Church, King's Lynn, entitled King's Lynn Minster since 2011, is a Grade I listed parish church in the Church of England in King's Lynn, Norfolk. The building dates from the 12th to 15th centuries, with major restoration of the nave in the 18th century. Five of its ten bells and its organ also date back to the mid-18th century.

== History ==
=== Benedictine priory ===
The church was established by Herbert de Losinga, Bishop of Norwich in 1095 to serve a Benedictine Priory and dedicated to St Margaret of Antioch. The priory was subordinate to the Priory of the Holy Trinity in Norwich.

The slender 12th-century south-west tower in the Early English Gothic style precedes the larger north-west tower in the Perpendicular style of the 15th century. The chancel with clerestory dates from the 13th century, when the earlier Norman nave was replaced. Elements of the Norman building survive in the base of the south-west tower.

=== Parish church ===
After the English Reformation St Margaret's became the parish church for the town of King's Lynn, and its property was used as an endowment for Norwich Cathedral. Prior Drake was made prebend of the fourth stall in Norwich Cathedral.

The central lantern and south-west spire collapsed in 1741, which destroyed much of the nave. This was reconstructed in a programme of rebuilding between 1745 and 1746 by the architect Matthew Brettingham in an early Gothic revival style. The church retains its medieval misericords.

St Margaret's church was granted the honorary title King's Lynn Minster in 2011 by the Bishop of Norwich.

== Bells ==
The oldest bell is a Sanctus bell dating from 1657 by Thomas Norris. The main ring of 10 bells is in the key of C with a tenor weighing just over 28 long hundredweight (1,400 kg).

- 1 Mears and Stainbank 1887
- 2 Mears and Stainbank 1887
- 3 Lester and Pack 1766
- 4 Lester and Pack 1766
- 5 Lester and Pack 1766
- 6 Lester and Pack 1766
- 7 Lester and Pack 1766
- 8 Mears and Stainbank 1893
- 9 John Taylor Bellfounders Ltd 2005
- 10 Lester and Pack 1766

== Organ ==
The organ dates from 1754 when it was installed by John Snetzler. The church organist for nine years from 1751 was the music historian and composer Charles Burney. The organ has been through many restorations and rebuildings since then, the latest in 2003 by Holmes and Swift. Specifications of the organ can be found on the National Pipe Organ Register.

== Gallery ==
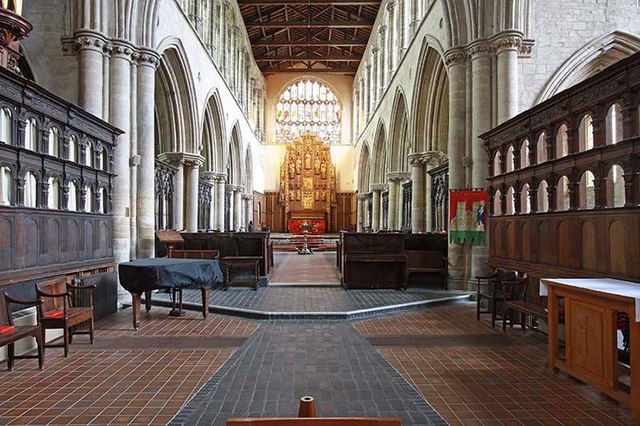
The nave and chancel

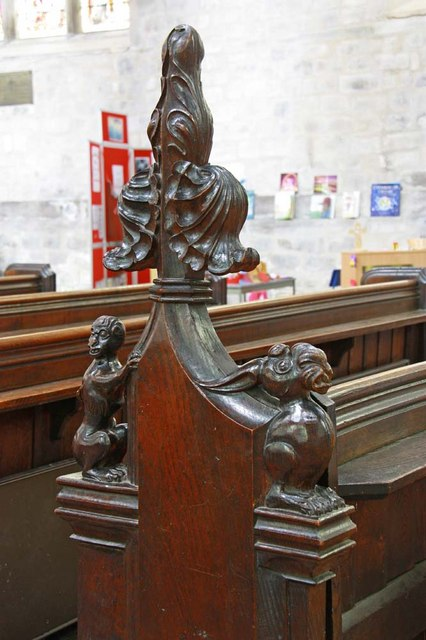
A pew end

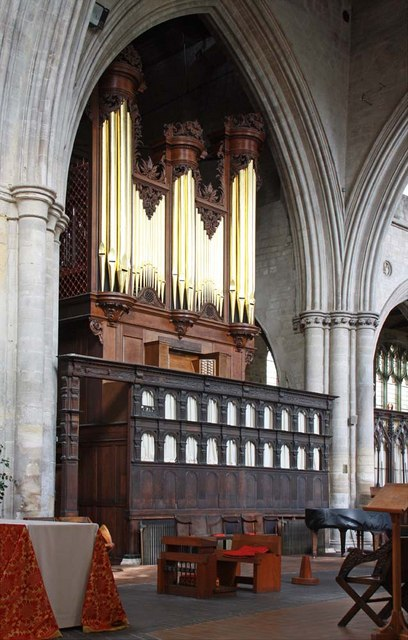
The Sneztler organ case
