= Bishop's palace =

A bishop's palace is a form of ecclesiastical architecture constituting the official residence of a bishop.The term was not used in the British Isles until the Church of England was restructured following the Norman Conquest of 1066 AD. However, the oldest has been dated to the seventh century. A bishop's palace provided luxury accommodation for a bishop along with facilities for the bishop's staff. See palaces were those which were in the vicinity of the bishops' cathedrals, others were more modest manor houses. They were generally set within enclosures, sometimes moated, often including ancillary buildings, such as halls, chapels or gatehouses. Although many were used throughout the medieval period, their use declined after the Reformation, and only a few are still in use in the twenty-first century. Historic England have positively identified about 150 bishops' palaces in England, all of which they regard as being of national importance.
