= William Freney =

William Freney (or William Fresney), an Englishman, was a Dominican friar and archbishop of Edessa (1263 – c.1290). His career was divided between England and the Levant. He served as a diplomat and negotiator for both English kings and Popes.

== In the East ==
In 1254, William was in Rome seeking the commutation of King Henry III's crusader vow.

On 1 August 1263, Pope Urban IV instructed the Latin patriarch of Antioch, Opizo di Fieschi, to consecrate William to a diocese or archdiocese of his choosing in Arabia, Media or Armenia. According to Urban's letter, William had already been raised to episcopal status and was planning a trip to the East. Opizo was prohibited from giving William an archdiocese subject to Antioch, but only one subject directly to Rome and so he consecrated him archbishop of Edessa. In Europe, the city of Edessa (modern Urfa) was mistakenly identified with Rages in Persia. It had had Latin archbishops in the early twelfth century, but had been under Muslim rule since 1144. William was to be the only thirteenth-century archbishop. His appointment may have been intended to facilitate missionary activity "in infidel lands" (in partibus infidelium).

William's good knowledge of several languages (which are unknown) made him valuable as a diplomat. In 1264, Urban sent William on an embassy to Hethum I, king of Armenia. His mission was a success. Good relations between Armenia and the Papacy were restored and, probably influenced by William, Hethum expressed a desire to establish a Dominican monastery in his kingdom.

William's whereabouts between 1267 and 1273 are unknown, and he may have accompanied Prince Edward on his crusade to Syria in 1271–72.

== In England ==
William spent 1265–67—the height of the Second Barons' War—in England. On 12 February 1265, King Henry III assigned him the deanery of Wimborne for his maintenance until either he returned to his diocese or obtained another title. In September, Henry revoked this grant and instead assigned William a yearly pension of 50 marks from the revenues of the manor of Havering. In October, he granted William the manor itself for life. In February 1266, William was given the manor of Silverstone to be held at the king's pleasure. Later that year, the king received complaints about William's procurations (levies on the manors' tenants), and by May 1267 the manors had been bestowed on others.

At the siege of Kenilworth in 1266, William tried to negotiate with the rebellious garrison on behalf of the besieging royalist army, but he was refused entry into the castle. On 21 July 1266, the king charged him with escorting certain rebel representatives to court for peace negotiations, but these too failed. The chronicler William Rishanger nonetheless recalls him as "a man of discretion and praiseworthy eloquence".

William may have left England around the time he lost his manors. If so, he had returned by August 1273, when Edward, who in the meantime had succeeded Henry as king, granted the archbishop a tun of wine. William seems to have remained mainly in England after that, strongly associating himself with Norfolk and assisting the English church where he could. In 1274, he granted the monks of Bury St Edmunds a forty-day indulgence for those visiting the prior's chapel to pray for the souls of past abbots and venerate the wooden bier on which Egelwin had brought the body of Edmund the Martyr to Bury St Edmunds in 1014. On 28 December 1275, he consecrated the prior's chapel dedicated to Saints Stephen and Edmund at Bury St Edmunds.

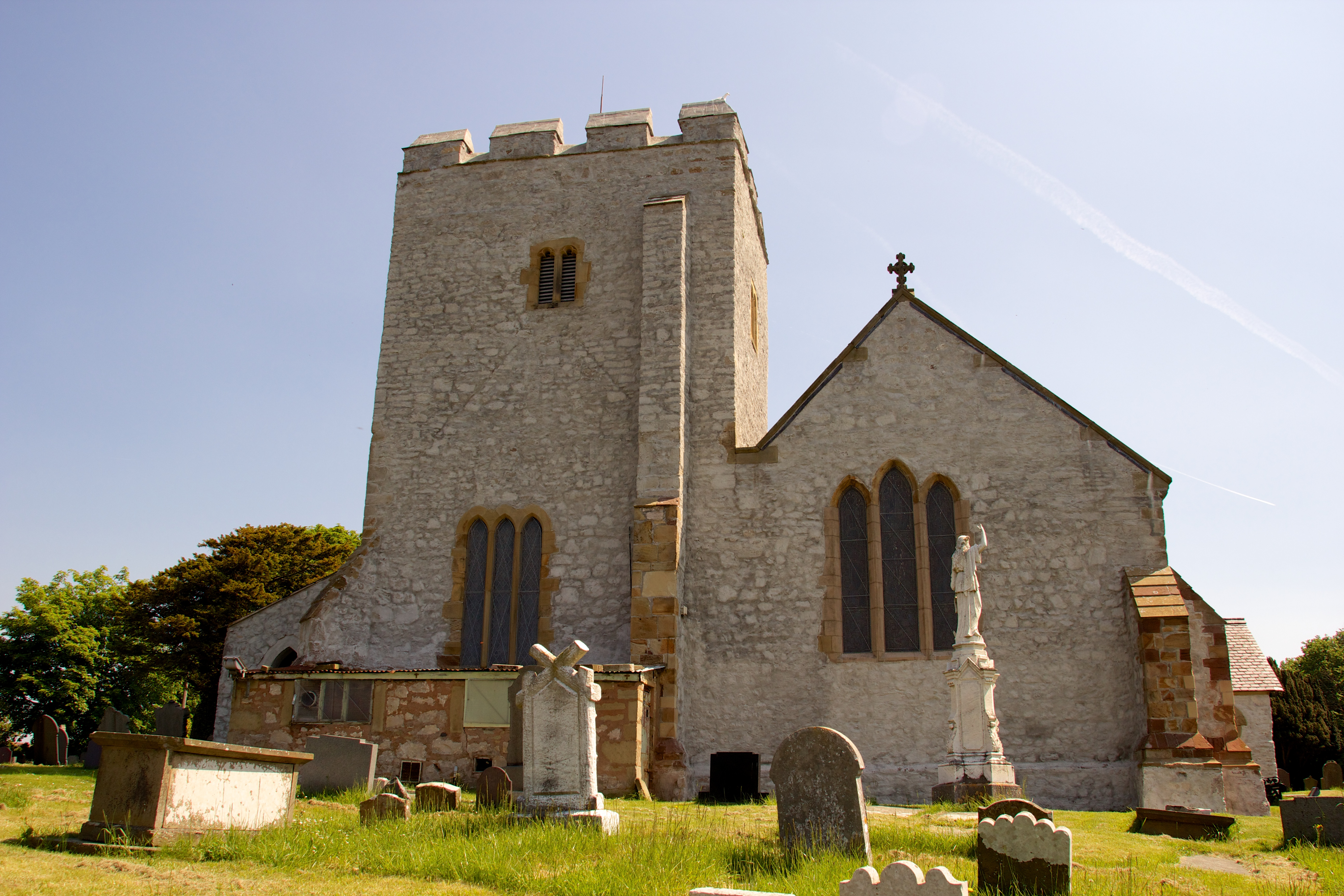
St Mary's in Rhuddlan, where William's tombstone lies

By 1276 William was acting as a suffragan bishop of the diocese of Norwich under Roger Skerning. In that year, he consecrated a site for the erection of a Carmelite priory in Norwich and the high altar at Bishop's Lynn. In November 1277, he was acting as a Papal nuncio when he wrote to Godfrey Giffard, bishop of Worcester, about collecting Peter's pence. That year Edward gave him two more tuns of wine. In November 1278, he assisted the new bishop, William Middleton, in the consecration of Norwich Cathedral. In 1280, he attended the translation of the remains of Hugh of Lincoln to Norwich.

In 1282, William received the manor of Cringleford. His last appearance in the record is in 1286. There is no evidence that he went to the East after 1273, nor is there any indication of his date of death. He was presumably buried in a Dominican friary and his tombstone removed during the dissolution to St Mary's Church in Rhuddlan, where it resides today. It bears the effigy of a bishop with mitre and crozier. Its inscription, in Norman French, reads, "Pray for the soul of Friar William Freney, archbishop of Rages".

== Sources ==
- Gransden, Antonia (2015). A History of the Abbey of Bury St Edmunds, 1257–1301: Simon of Luton and John of Northwold. Boydell Press.
- Gumbley, W. (1914–15). "William Fresney, O.P., Archbishop of Rages (Edessa), 1263–1290". Flintshire Historical Society Journal: 36–41.
- Hinnebusch, William A. (1942). "Diplomatic Activities of the English Dominicans in the Thirteenth Century". The Catholic Historical Review. 28 (3): 309–39.
- Jackson, Peter (2005). "Freney, William (fl. 1263–1286)". Oxford Dictionary of National Biography (Online [2014] ed.). Oxford University Press. doi:10.1093/ref:odnb/92436.
- Richard, Jean (1949). "Deux évêques dominicains agents de l'union arménienne au moyen-âge". Archivum Fratrum Praedicatorum. 19: 255–65.
- Richard, Jean (1977). La papauté et les mission d'Orient au Moyen Âge (XIII^{e}–XV^{e} siècles). Collection de l'École Française de Rome. Vol. 33. Rome: École Française de Rome.
