= Agnes Ramsey =

English businesswoman (died 1399)

- Died: c. 1399
- Occupations: Businesswoman, mason
- Father: William de Ramsey
- Relatives: John de Ramsey (grandfather)

Agnes Ramsey (died c. 1399), was an English businesswoman and mason, who was responsible for the construction of Queen Isabella of France's tomb.

== Early life and marriage ==
Agnes Ramsey was the daughter of architect and stone mason William Ramsey and his wife Christina. She was also the granddaughter of mason John de Ramsey.

On 23 November 1331, Ramsey's parents were among a group accused of abducting fourteen-year-old Robert Huberd, who was heir to a significant amount of property, from the home of his guardian, John Spray, and marrying him to Agnes. They were all acquitted and Huberd chose to remain with Agnes and her father became his new guardian. Huberd also later became a mason.

== Career ==
Upon the death of her father in 1349 from the plague, Ramsey inherited his business, including a London-based workshop that produced tombs. Ramsey took on her father's debt and participated in property transactions. She submitted accounts to the exchequer, showing that her father had not received more than half of the fees owed to him as the King's chief mason.

She was a very successful mason-architect, and belonged to the elite of the profession in late 14th-century London. In the 1350s, she was contracted by Queen Isabella of France for the construction of the queen's tomb at the London Greyfriars, at a cost of over £100. Ramsey is thought to be responsible for personally overseeing the construction and the placement of Edward II's heart in Isabella's tomb.

Ramsey continued to oversee the business until 1399, which is when she is thought to have died.
