= St Ethelbert's Gate =

Gatehouse and former chapel in Norwich, England

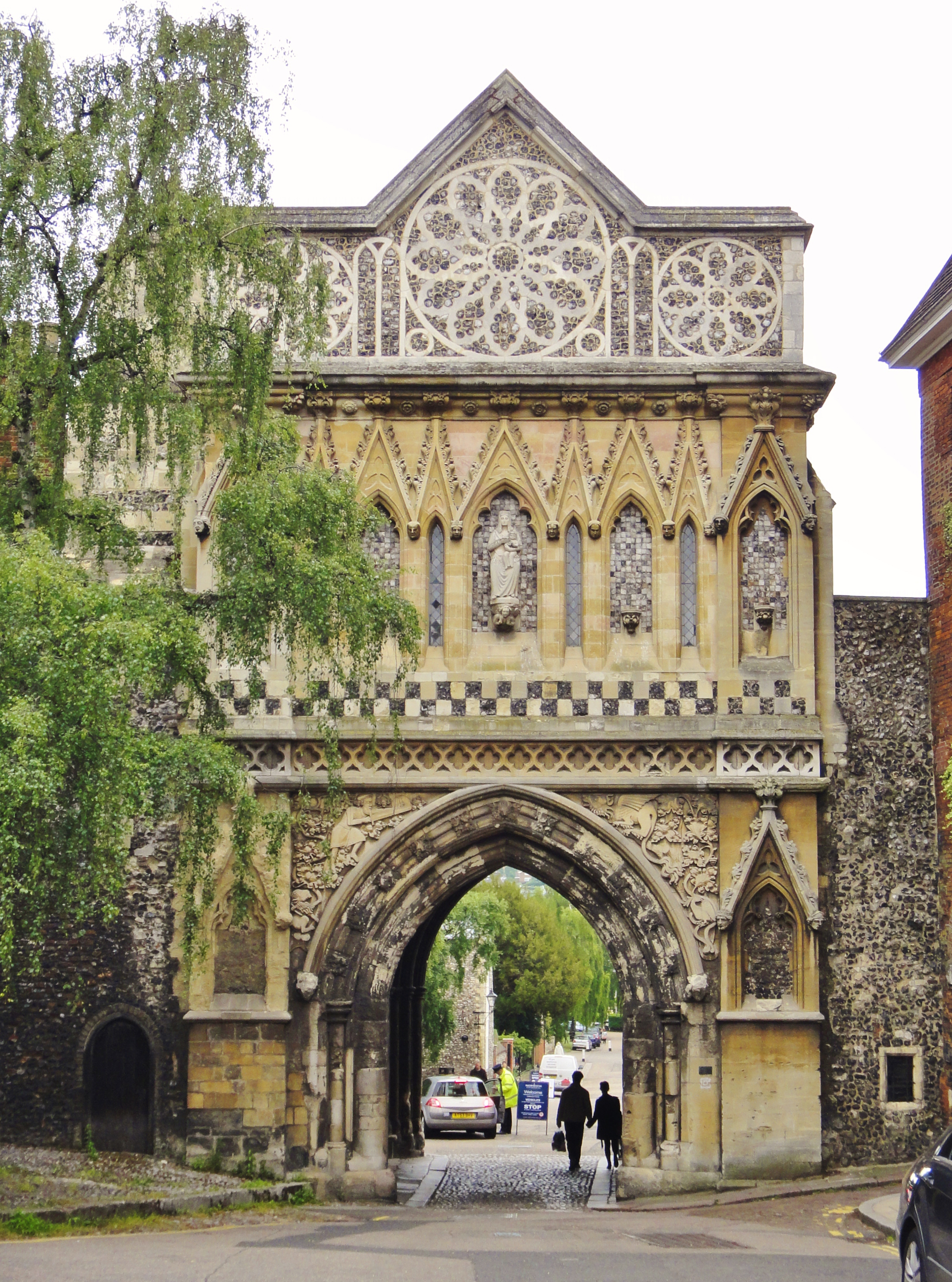
- The west (Tombland) side of St Ethelbert's Gate in 2013
- Interactive map of the St Ethelbert's Gate area

General information
- Location: Norwich, Norfolk, England
- Coordinates: 52.63061°N 1.29970°E
- Grid position: TG 23400 08762
- Year built: c. 1316

St Ethelbert's Gate or the Great Gate is a 14th-century Grade I listed gatehouse in the precinct wall of Norwich Cathedral in Norfolk, England, dedicated to Ethelbert, king of East Anglia. It was built in around 1316 to replace an earlier gate on the same site which was burnt down in a 1272 riot against the Bishop of Norwich, Roger Scarning. A chapel on its upper floor also replaced a church of the same dedication that was burnt down in the same riot. Construction of the new gate was intended as part of appeasement for the riot.

The chapel above the gateway was used as a dwelling until 1663, and then as a repository for the bishop's documents. In the 19th century it became a classroom for a song school, and has retained its classroom function since. The gate received significant restoration in the 19th and 20th centuries. It is also a scheduled monument.

== History ==
=== Church of St Ethelbert ===
The church of St Ethelbert which preceded St Ethelbert's Gate likely had a founding in the Late Saxon period, before the Norman Conquest. Its dedication to Ethelbert, king of East Anglia, who was murdered in 794, was also likely pre-Norman. It was one of 15 churches in England, 11 in East Anglia, and seven in Norfolk with this dedication. It was also abbreviated to St Albert's. In 1096, the church was enveloped into the close of Norwich Cathedral. It would have stood to the south-east of what is now St Ethelbert's gate.

The church was a rectory, and had parishioners who lived both inside and outside the cathedral close. The size of its churchyard is unclear; it was possibly an island site bounded by a route from St Michael at Plea to St Mary in the Marsh to the north, a possible extension to St Faith's Lane to the south and east, and Sevecote Rowe to the west. The extent of the parish is similarly unknown but possibly included Bigod's palace (also known as le Stonhus), and was probably bounded by Sevecote Lane on the west, St Faith's Lane on the south, and a line between St Ethelbert's and St Mary's on the east. To the north, the parish may have extended far, maybe to a possible Roman road.

=== Original gate ===
The original gate, which St Ethelbert's gate later replaced in the same position, was likely built in c. 1120; by this time, work on Norwich Cathedral would have moved past the crossing, making labour and materials more available for other works such as the gate. It would have acted as the main service entry to the priory. It was subject to little controversy until the 1272 riot.

This gate was constructed of coursed flints, and had piers at both ends. At about 14 feet (4.3 m) in height, the gate would have had either a floor or roof consisting of 10-by-10-inch (25 cm × 25 cm) cross-beam logs supported by a wall plate and struts from corbels. The niches for these struts still remain. The structure was likely around 3 metres (9.8 ft) shallower than the present gate that replaced it.

=== 1272 storms and Bishop Scarning's charter, and riot ===
In the summer of 1272 around 19 June, a riot in Norwich, caused by controversy between the Norwich citizens and the cathedral, broke out. On 29 June, a thunderstorm struck the spire of Norwich Cathedral, damaging it; on 8 August, Bishop Scarning's charter, the earliest surviving documentary mention of the church, acknowledged damage by 'wind, tumults and other tempests' to St Ethelbert's church also.

In response in his 8 August charter, Bishop Scarning ordained that all parishioners of St Ethelbert's church, which was within the close and thus exempt from control by Norwich's archdeacon and dean, were to instead use St Mary in the Marsh, which was outside the close at the time. Simultaneously, Scarning directed the original parishioners of St Mary's to use St Cuthbert's church which was under cathedral priory control. This effectively made St Ethelbert's church redundant. While this may have been a practical decision, it may equally have been an attempt to bring the churches further under the priory's control. Parishioners were instructed to pay their tithes and other dues to their new respective churches, and their ties to the churches at which they had been baptised and married were effectively severed. Bishop Scarning also appointed one Simon de Scarning, who had been the rector of St Ethelbert's, as St Mary's priest. This deal would be ratified by archdeacon Thomas de Scarning some months later.

Three days following the charter on 11 August, a civil conflict began in which 13 people were killed and parts of the cathedral and its priory were burnt by the citizens of the city. Bartholomew Cotton recounted that:

When they failed to gain admittance, they set fire to the main gate into the monastery, beyond which lay a certain parish church. They burned the gate and the church together with all its ornaments, books, images and contents.

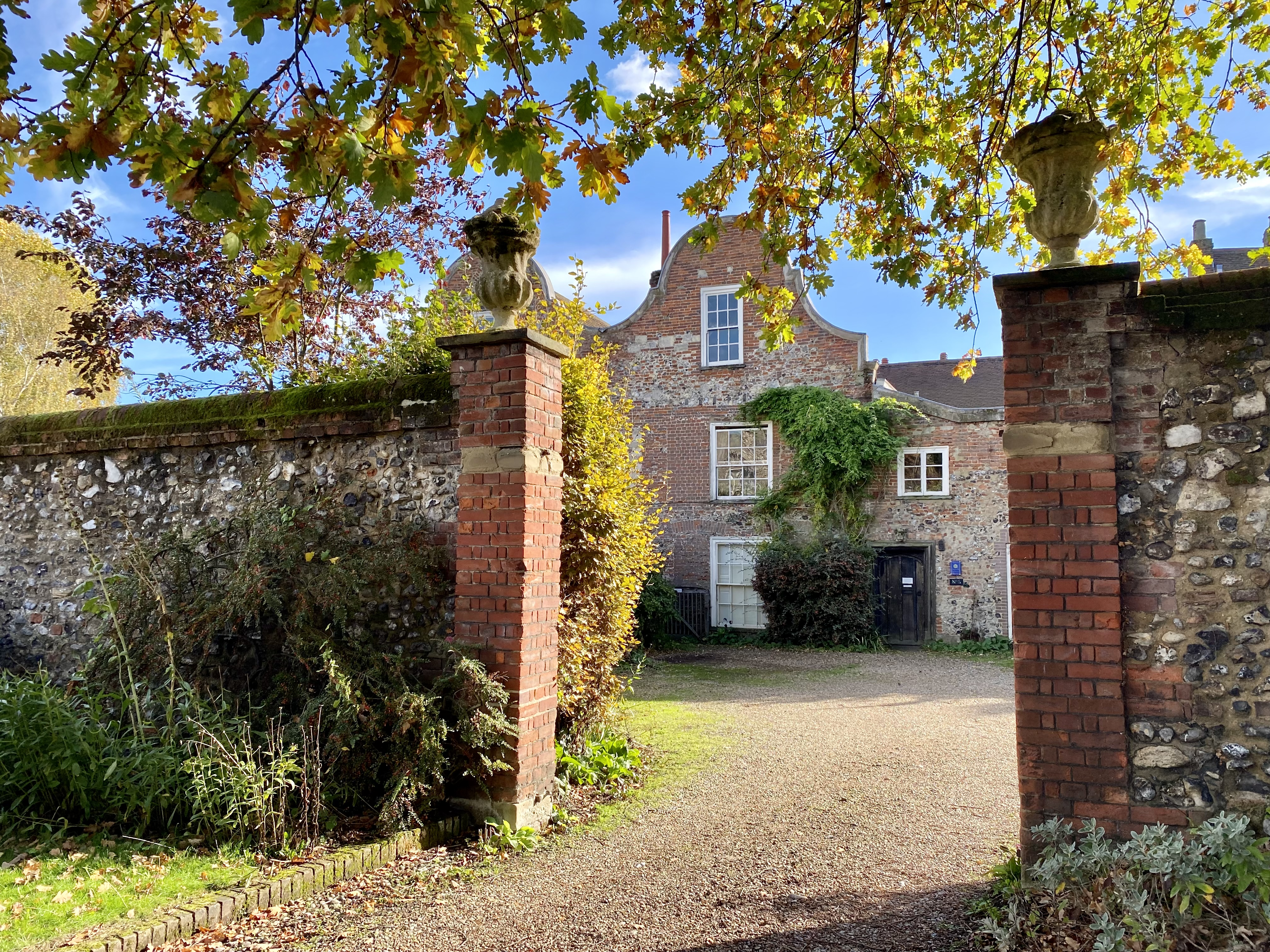
The site of the church (TG 23449 08742) was what is now Almary Green, in the front garden of 6 The Close.

It is generally agreed that this church was St Ethelbert's. The church was not rebuilt after its destruction. In the Norwich Cathedral close on what is now Almary Green (a patch of land spanning a third of an acre), parchmarks can still be seen in the grass today which show the position of the church, which is now the front garden of 6 The Close. A 1970s geophysical survey of the area found evidence of the remains of a stone structure near the northern end of Almary Green.

The original gate, on the other hand, appears to have at least stayed usable for four decades through to its reconstruction. 12th-century ashlar quoins are still visible on either side of the passageway of the reconstructed gate, with burn marks visible.

== St Ethelbert's Gate ==
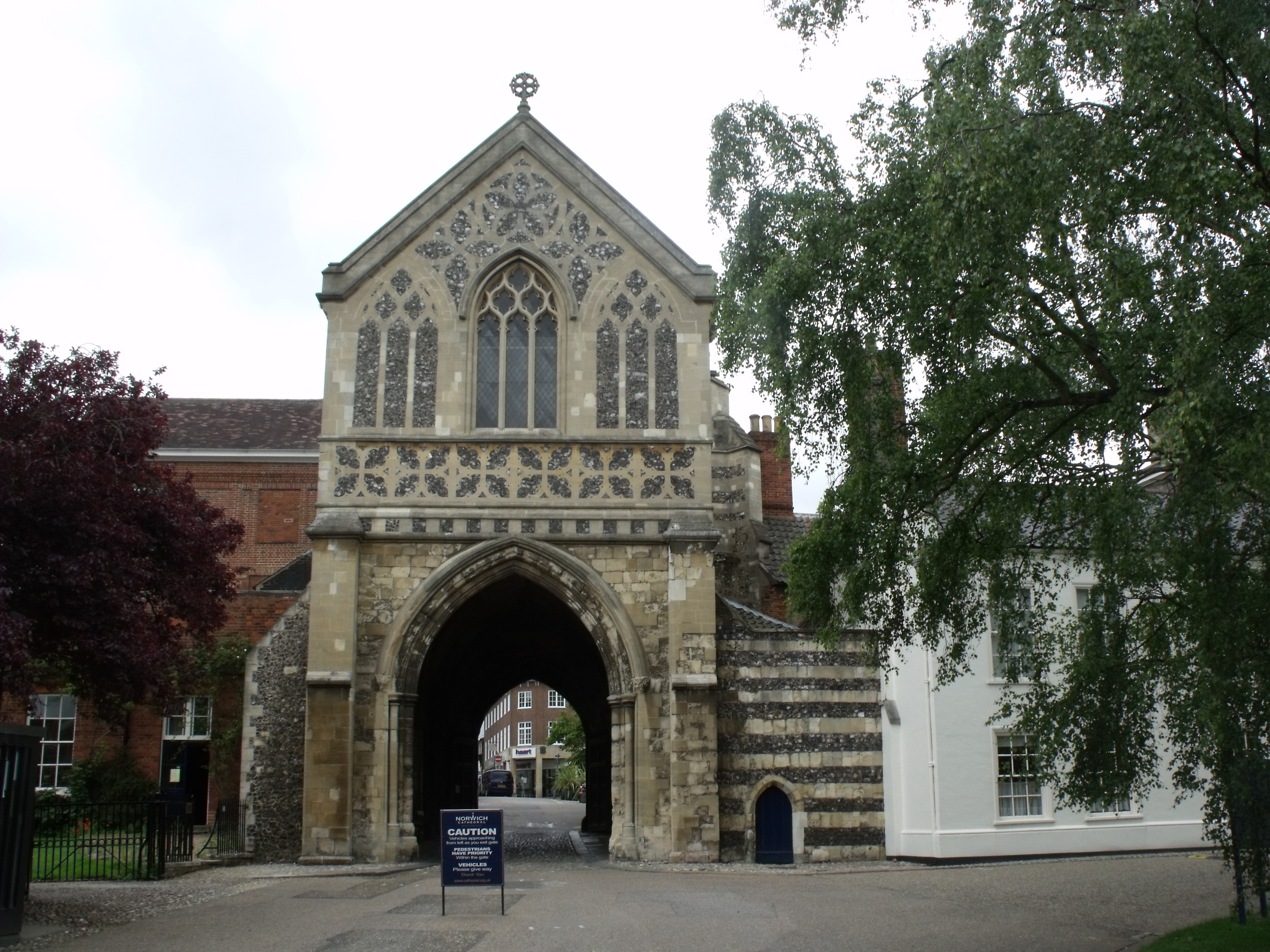
The east façade of St Ethelbert's Gate in 2011

Following the riot, the lifting of an resultant interdict in October 1275, and the absolvement of the excommunicated citizens by the Archbishop of Canterbury (though 30 were already hanged), it was decided that a new chapel would be built over the restored gate. This would be part of appeasement for what the rioters had done to the cathedral, and would replace St Ethelbert's church. The rebuilding of the gate appears to have been low on the list of priorities for the cathedral.

The gate would be reconstructed during John Salmon's time as Bishop of Norwich. A 1316–17 payment was recorded for the reconstruction of the gate and chapel; "expensis circa portas". The £115 8s 5¼d total was apparently payment for several years of previous work. The communar's accounts list the building materials as well as the purchase of two robes for the master; a winter robe costing 18s 4d and a summer one which cost £1. Those involved in the construction included one William Ramsey and his brother. One John 'sculptor' was also involved; Brian Ayers et al have suggested that this may have been John Ramsey I who has been credited for the reconstruction of the similar gateway to the monastic precinct at Bury St Edmunds, and who had property in Norwich.

A priest was assigned to officiate. It essentially acted as a chapel of ease for St Mary in the Marsh. It is unclear how much the chapel was used by those who could no longer use their former church. The chapel was not endowed, with the priest's only way to gain a stipend being through voluntary donation. Struggling to obtain funds for the chapel's upkeep, from the year 1519 or earlier than this, the cellarer let out the gate as a dwelling and it continued as such until 1663. At this time, the bishop's documents began to be stored there. A repair to a crack in the north wall took place around this time also, possibly in 1677 which is noted on a stone on the north side of the gate's eastern front. This repair failed. Small repairs, particularly to the attic storey, were made in 1809 by Repton and Fayerman.

=== As a classroom ===
In 1815, further repairs took place and William Wilkins redesigned the attic in Portland stone. An organ was added, thereby converting the chapel into a song school classroom. Further restoration took place in the 20th century. A large amount of the stonework and carvings were replaced in the 19th and 20th-century restorations.

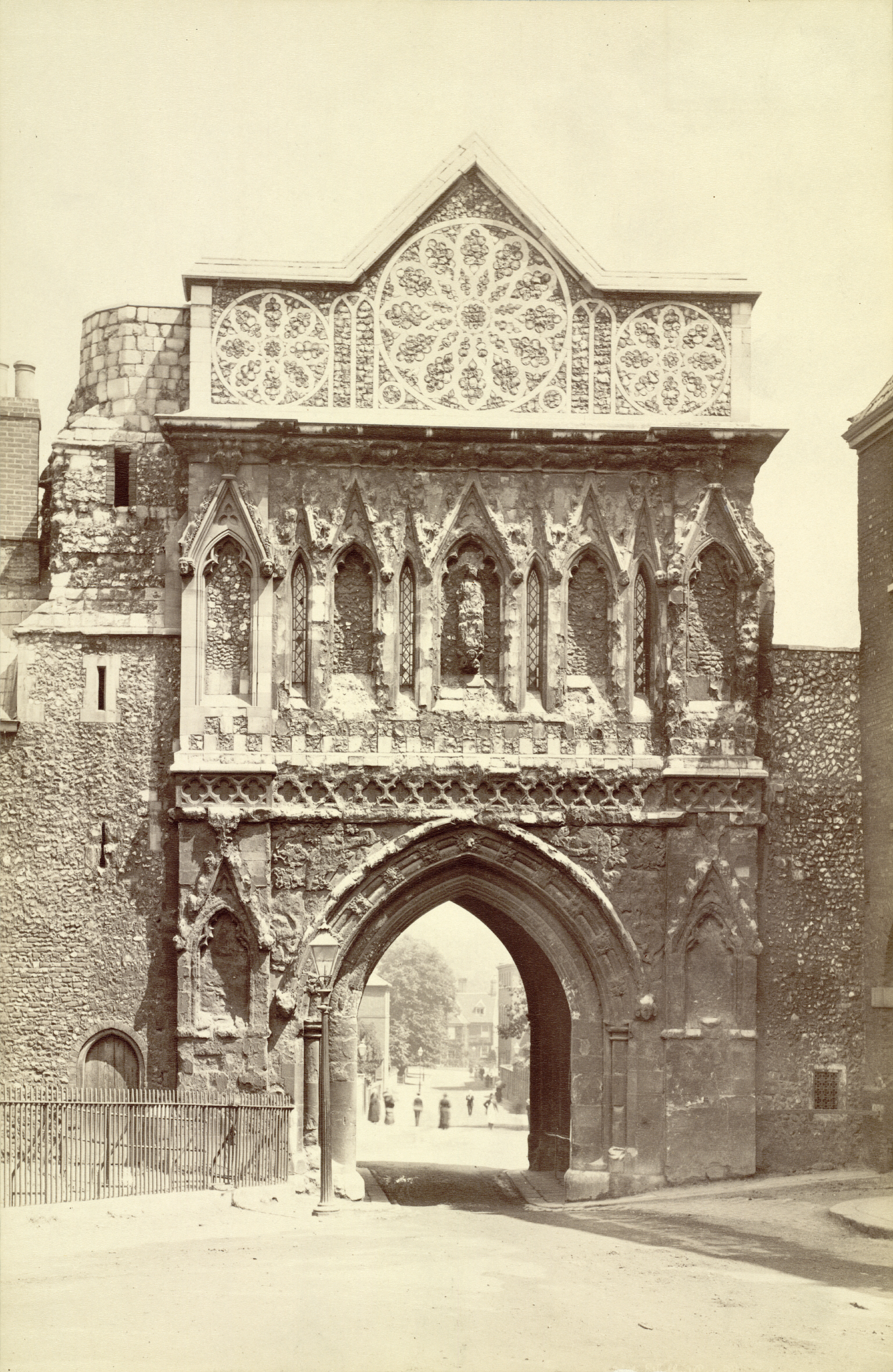
The gate's west façade as photographed in 1865

After its absorption by the King Edward VI School, the chapel continued as a classroom. In 1950, J. W. Chaplin strengthened the south-east corner of the building, and in 1954 P. V. Howes restored its east window. The same latter year, the gate became a Grade I listed building. It remains as a music classroom today under the Norwich School.

== Architecture ==
St Ethelbert's Gate is set into the precinct wall of the Norwich Cathedral close. It is two-storey, and is constructed with flint flushwork and moulded limestone ashlar. It is possibly the earliest firmly dateable example of an architectural aesthetic that would be used for two further centuries in East Anglia.

The gateway arch is two-centre and moulded, and sits on attached columns. In both the east and west arches, there is a moulding formation which appears to have come from a pair of roll and fillet mouldings, though this is not used in the vaulting within the arch. Richard K. Morris has argued that this constitutes an emerging form of the double ogee which was then popularised by William Ramsey in London. Under the arch are a selection of carved stone roof bosses, four of which possibly depict the 14th-century masons who created it, including Ramsey and his brother and two others. These bosses are the best-preserved examples of the quality of the original gate. There is a small door on the left side which leads to a clockwise spiral staircase, and access is available to the chapel from stairs both within the cathedral precinct and from the Tombland area outside the precinct. Inside the upper floor, there are three shafts that support two bays of lierne vaulting.

=== West façade ===
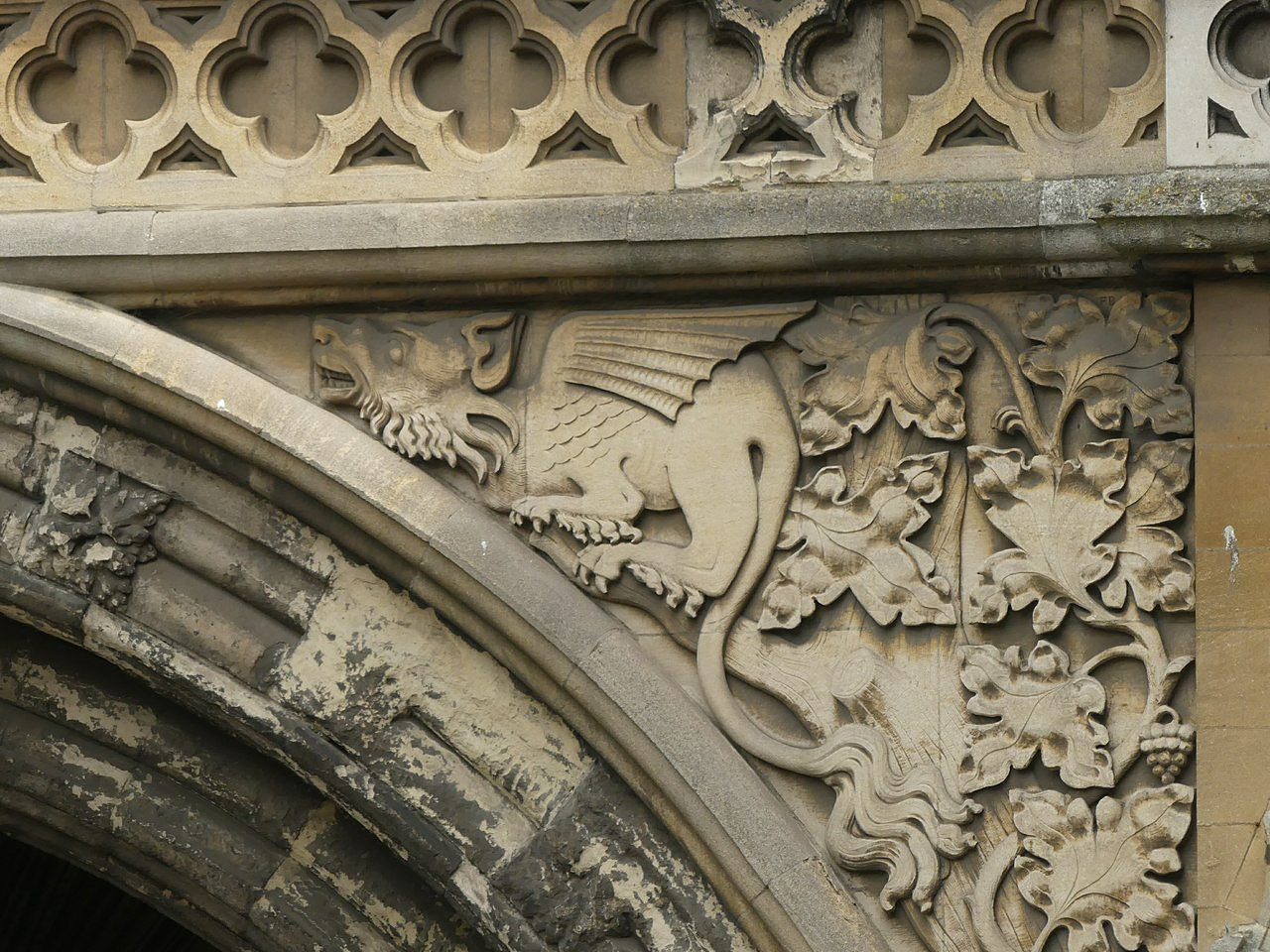
The 20th-century right spandrel on the west facade of St Ethelbert's Gate, depicting Saint George's dragon. A band of quatrefoils sits above.

On the west façade, the arch's spandrels are decorated with 20th-century depictions of Saint George and the Dragon on the left and right respectively, and these two figures are respectively accompanied by a lion on the left and a cockatrice on the right. The figures are framed amongst foliage, and appear to be related to the Bible's Isaiah 14. The west facade has seven canopied niches in total. This includes two blind niches either side of the arch that feature foilated over-arches which are triangular.

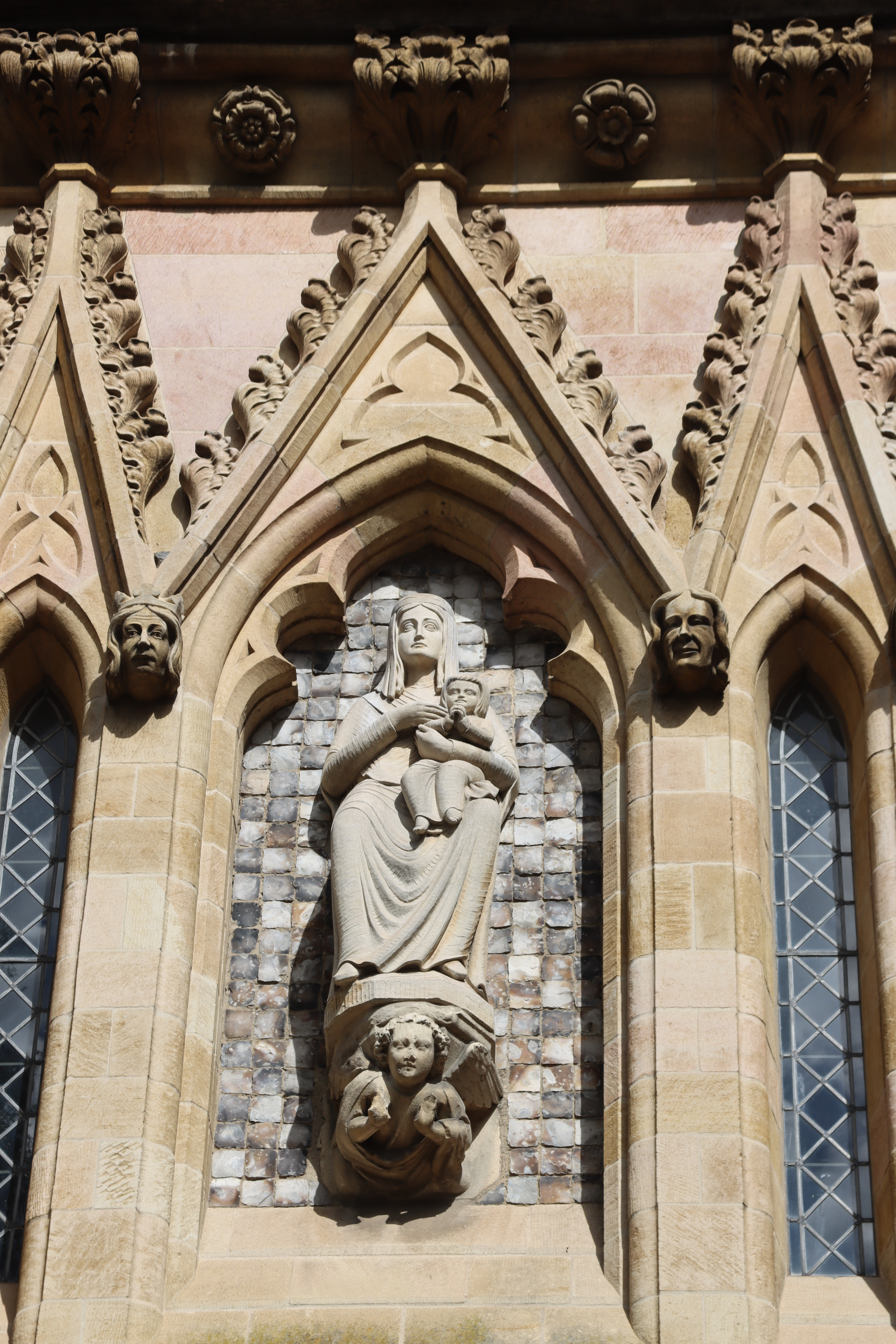
A modern statue of the Virgin and Child sits in the central niche of the west façade, flanked by lancet windows.

On the first floor, where the chapel is located, there is a string-band featuring quatrefoils. In the centre there is a modern statue of the Virgin and Child, though originally here would have existed a depiction of Christ displaying his wounds. There are also lancet windows; these are within further niches and similarly feature foilated and pointed over-arches. The cornice is decorated, and the parapet above it features circular flushwork and a central pediment. The flushwork designs here are different to the original designs that were documented in antiquarian sources. An 1803 drawing of the gate by John Adey Repton documented a large central roundel in which sat a six-pointed star, possibly referring to the Seal of Solomon, itself surrounded with six curved triangles, and this was flanked by further smaller roundels that had three triangles inside with half the number of cusps.

Arguments have been made that the gateway's design was based on a biblical description of one of Solomon's porches.
