= Flushwork =

Type of decorative masonry work

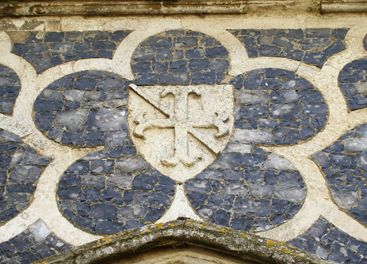
Arms of Sir Guy Ferre (d.1323) in flushwork at Butley Priory, Suffolk

In architecture, flushwork is decorative masonry work which combines on the same flat plane flint and ashlar stone. If the stone projects from a flat flint wall then the term is proudwork, as the stone stands "proud" rather than being "flush" with the wall.

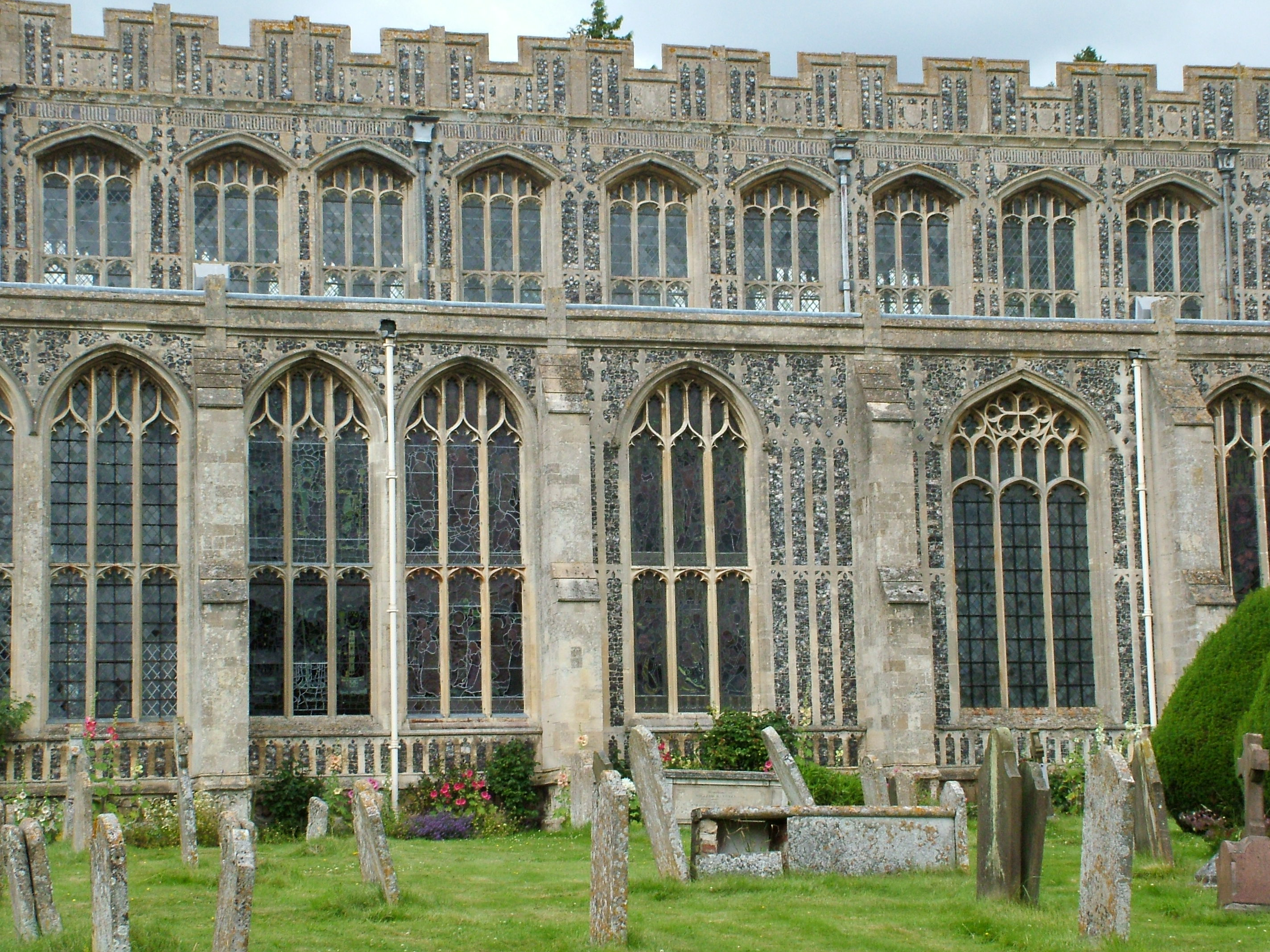
Elaborate 15th-century flint and limestone flushwork at Holy Trinity Church in Long Melford, Suffolk

Flushworked buildings belong to the Perpendicular style of English Gothic architecture. It is characteristic of the external walls of medieval buildings – most of the survivors being churches – in parts of Southern England and especially East Anglia. Flushwork began in the early 14th century, but the peak period was during the wool boom between about 1450 and the English Reformation of the 1520s, when church building virtually ceased and brick construction became more fashionable. The technique continued in occasional use, and saw a major revival in the 19th century, and is still sometimes used in a modern style today, as well as for the restoration or extension of older buildings.

== Technique ==
Flushwork, and flint architecture in general, is usually found in areas with no good local building stone. Although the labour cost of creating flushwork was high, it was still cheaper than importing the large quantity of stone necessary to build or face the entire structure.

The flints in flushwork areas are very carefully knapped (trimmed to shape by chipping) and selected for fit and consistency of colour. The stone usually used is a light limestone, often imported by sea and river from Caen in Normandy or other continental sources, which gives a strong contrast with flint that is most often black. The decorative patterns often form a notable contrast in these respects to those in nearby plain wall areas.

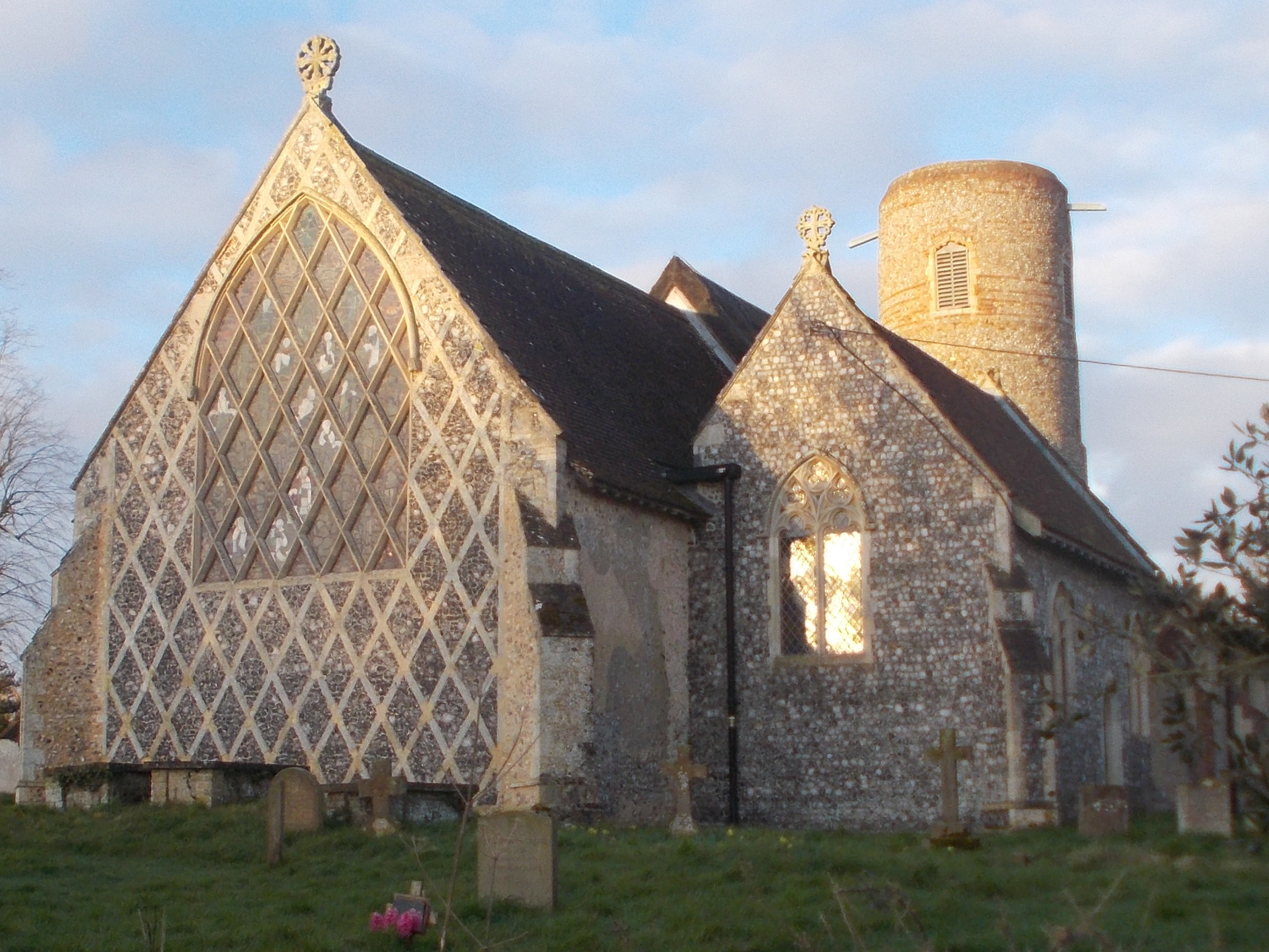
Unusual fretwork tracery and flushwork, at Holy Trinity Church in Barsham, Suffolk

== Uses ==
Typical motifs are arcades, chequers (diapering), shields, heraldic devices, and letters or whole inscriptions. Many motifs are very similar to those achieved in carved or pierced stonework in other areas.

As with carved stone decoration, it is most common to find friezes at the base or top of a wall, or a decorated parapet (again often a later addition) to the top of a tower. Few churches have flushwork all over the main body of the building. An exception is Holy Trinity Church, Long Melford. Porches added to an earlier church often contain showy flushwork, as at the church that is now Chelmsford Cathedral.

Sometimes large areas are covered with chequerwork or diapering, where blocks of stone (often light coloured limestone such as Chilmark Stone or chalk, or greensand) are alternated with panels of dressed flint in a chequerboard pattern. This style is a characteristic of Wiltshire architecture, both vernacular and ecclesiastical. Chequerwork is also found in East Anglia, such as on the Norwich Guildhall (pictured below), the Chapel of St Nicholas in Gipping, or the Victorian St Mary-le-Tower in Ipswich.

== Examples ==
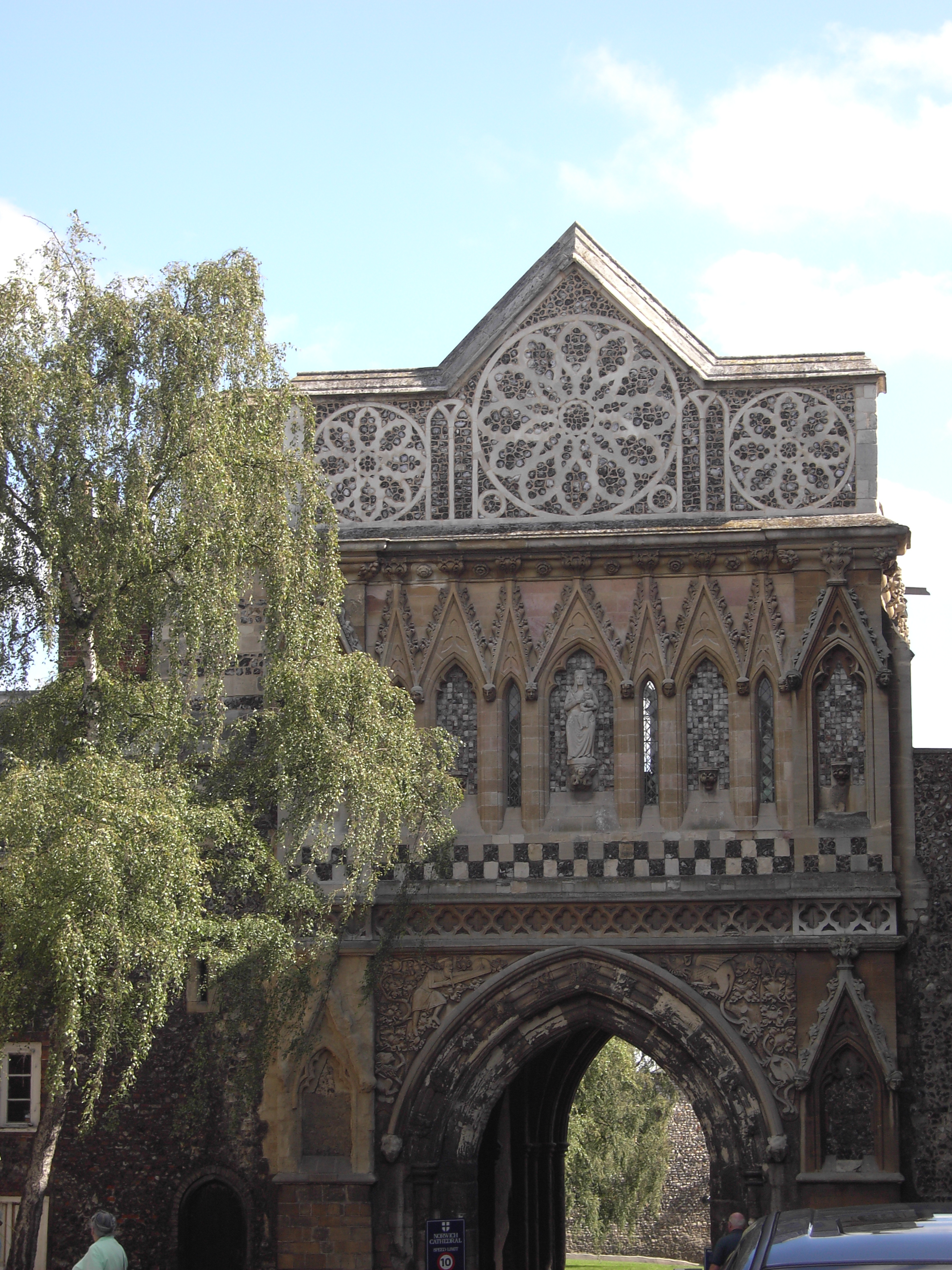
St Ethelbert's Gate at Norwich Cathedral

St Ethelbert's Gate at Norwich Cathedral is one of the most important surviving examples of early flushwork, begun in 1316–17 and completed the following decade. Only nine surviving gatehouses use flushwork, and this one is further distinguished by using it on all four elevations. (The heraldic priory gatehouse at Butley, Suffolk, of 1325 is another flamboyant early example.) The side pictured here has elaborate patterned flushwork in the top register, which uses selected round flints in the circular motifs; this section was restored in the 19th century slightly differently from the original design. The limestone is unusually dominant in the proudwork level with the statue below, where the squared flints are selected for a whitish colour. Below this there are two rows of black flint and limestone chequers.

Holy Trinity Church, Long Melford, Suffolk, is widely regarded as one of the finest wool churches in England. It displays arcading at four levels, shields, and a long inscription running below the crenellations; the inscription names the merchants who paid for the new church. The church of Stratford St Mary also displays long inscriptions, invoking prayers for the church's patrons.

According to Stephen Hart, there are over 500 English churches with some flushwork. Among the finest not mentioned above are St Edmund's Church in Southwold, the Church of Saint Mary in Woolpit, the church in Earl Soham, and several in Norwich. The unique, and odd, east end of Holy Trinity Church at Barsham, Suffolk, has a lattice pattern that continues from the window across the whole wall, although the date is highly uncertain.

== Gallery ==
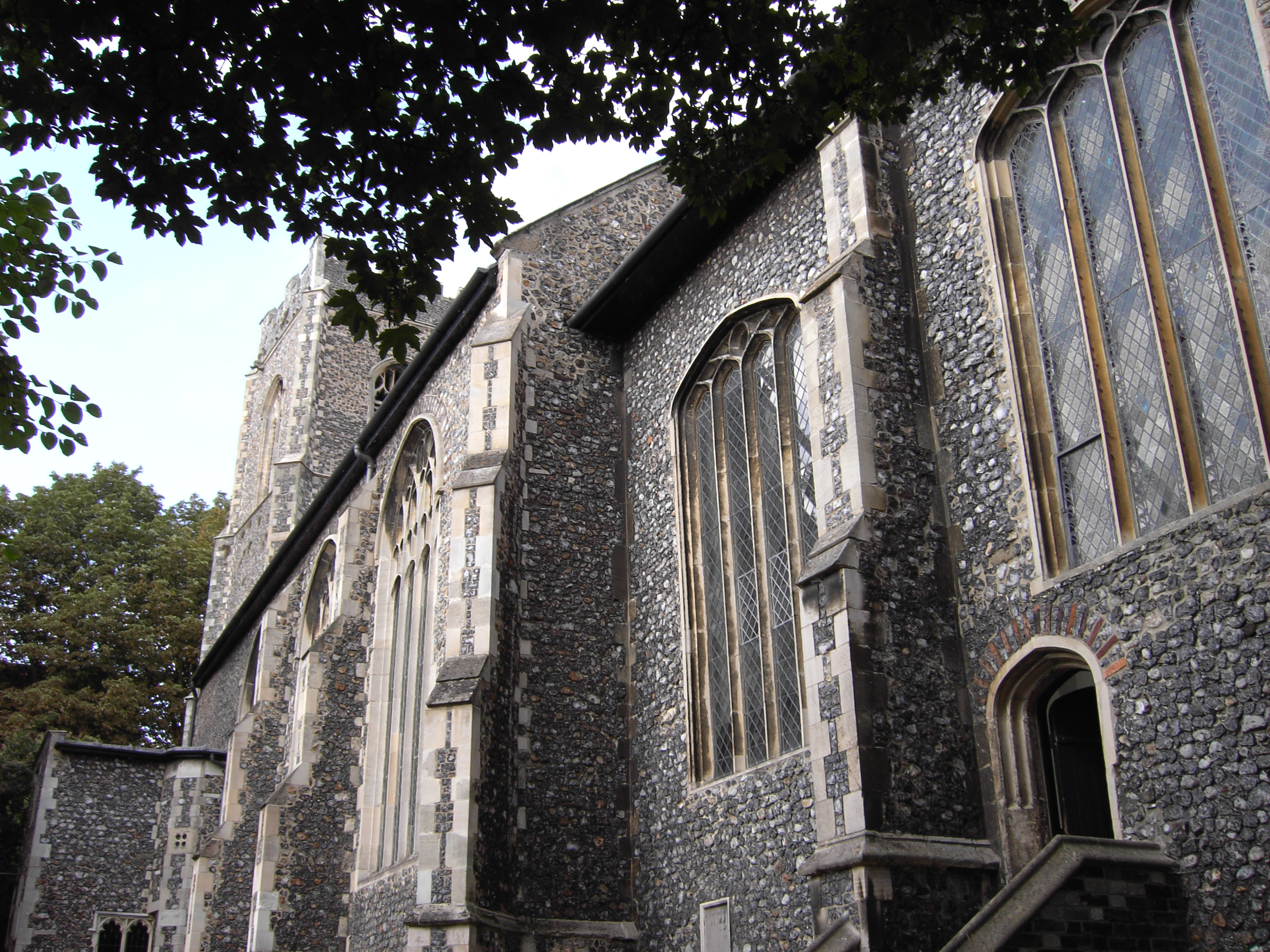
The decorative possibilities suggested by the contrast of limestone quoins against knapped flint no doubt inspired flushwork. (Church of St Peter Parmentergate, Norwich)

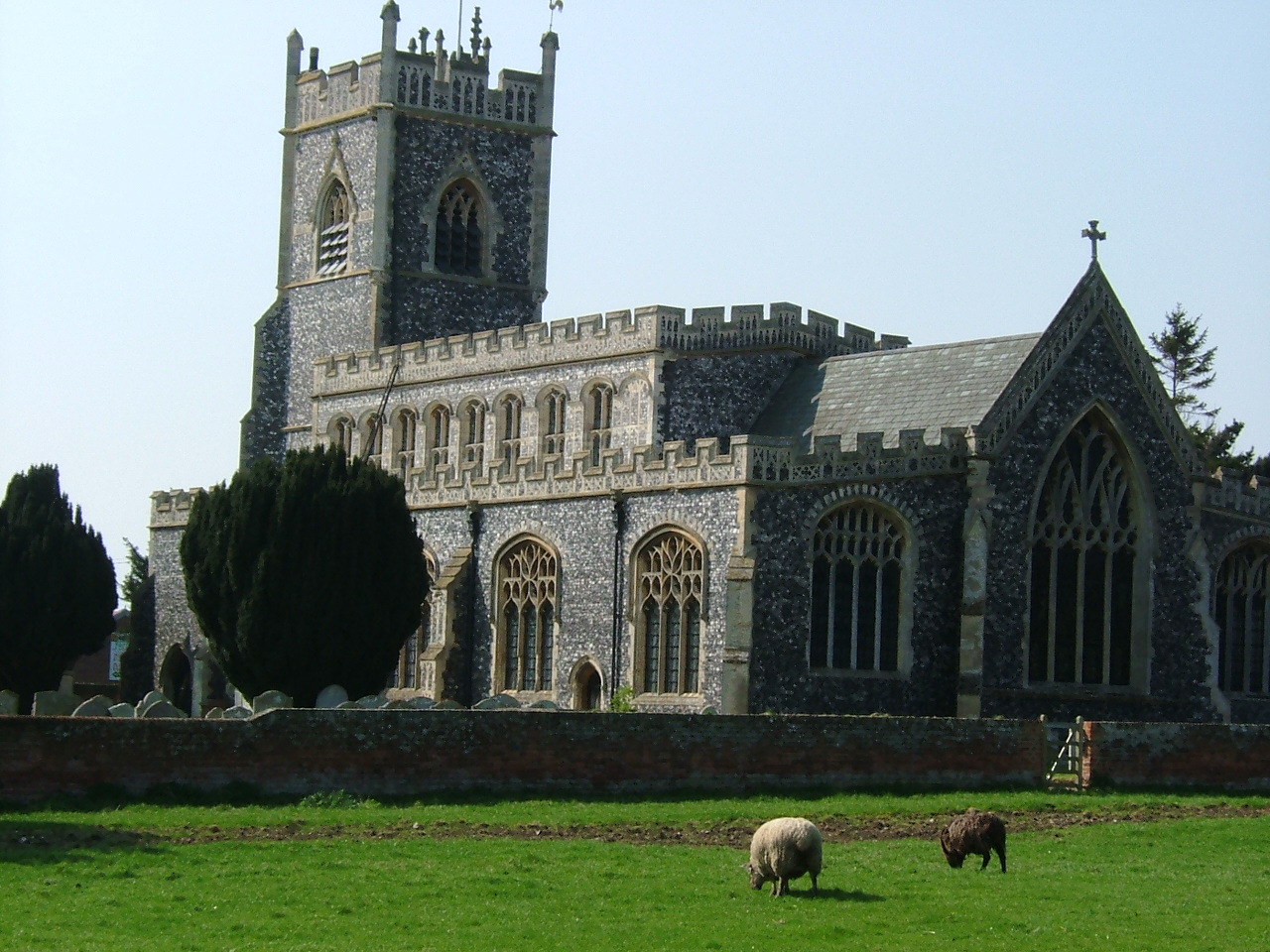
More typical limited flushwork on a village church at Stratford St Mary, Suffolk

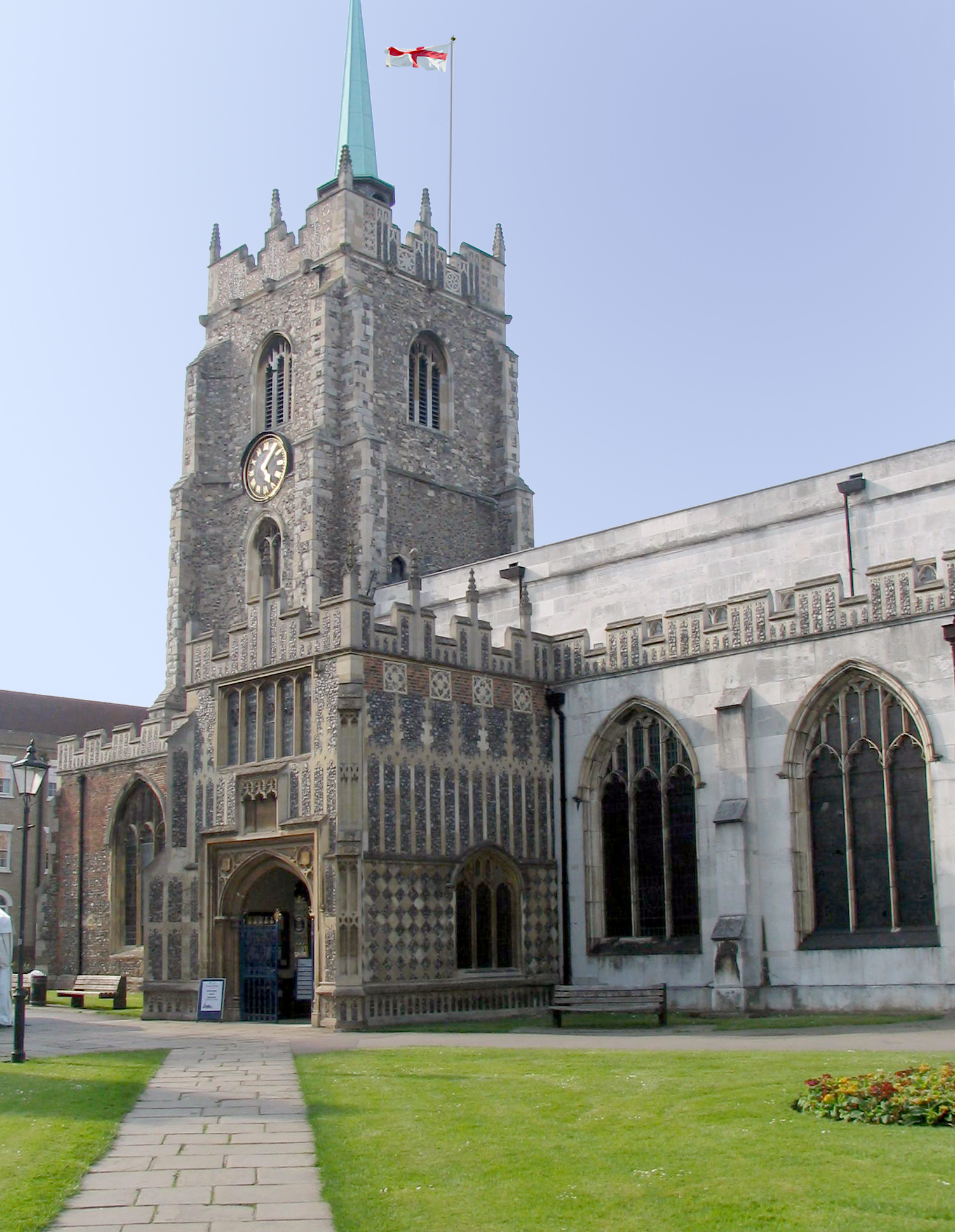
The porch at Chelmsford Cathedral (c. 1500) brings brick into the design at the top level.

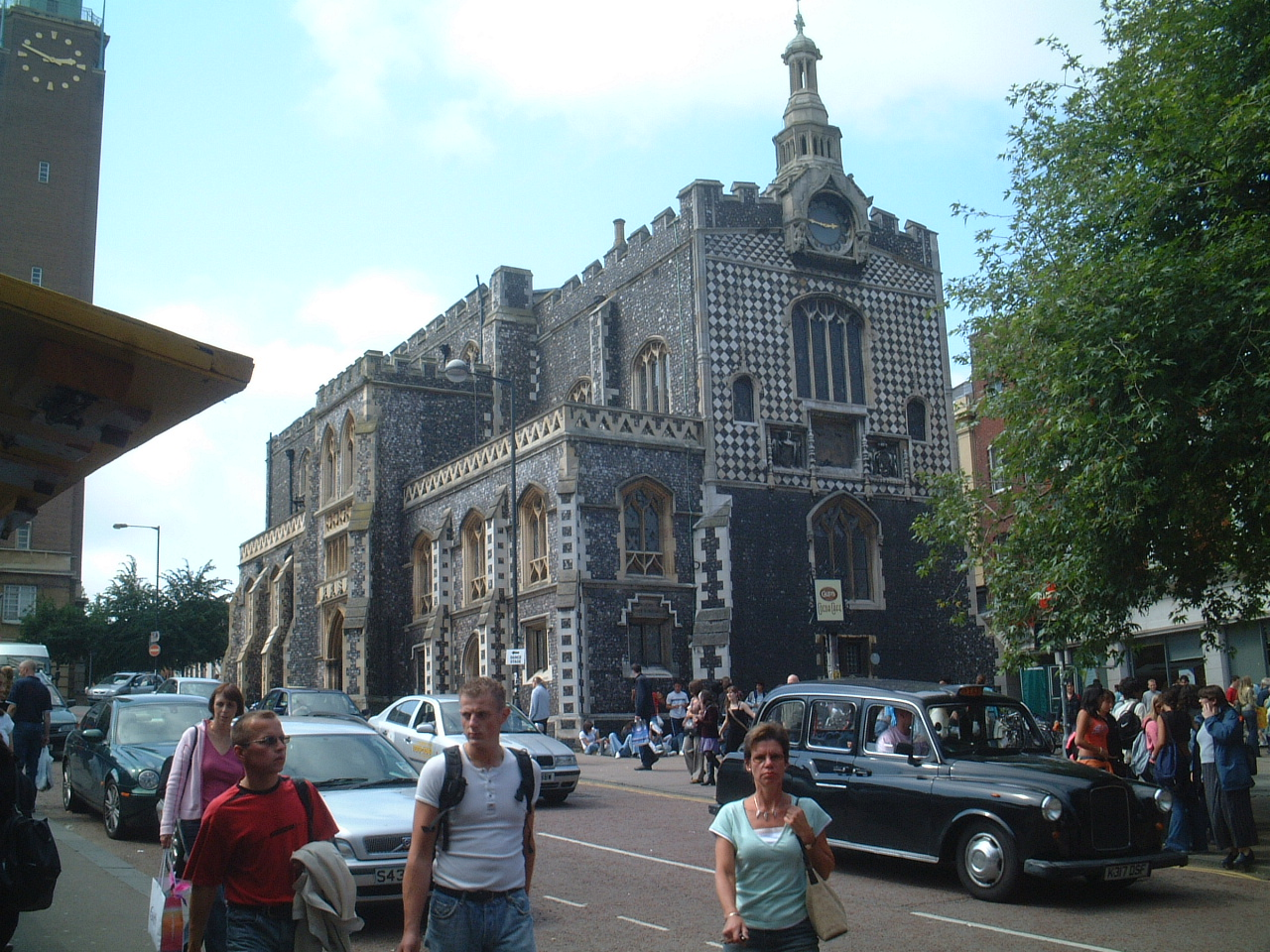
A secular building with diapering: the Norwich Guildhall, constructed in 1407–1412
