= Walter Suffield =

13th-century Bishop of Norwich

- Bishop of Norwich
- Elected: c. 9 July 1244
- Term ended: 19 May 1257
- Predecessor: William de Raley
- Successor: Simon Walton

Orders
- Consecration: 26 February 1245

Personal details
- Died: 19 May 1257
- Denomination: Roman Catholic

Walter Suffield (died 19 May 1257) was a medieval Bishop of Norwich.

== Life ==
Suffield was a canonist at Paris before his election to the see of Norwich about 9 July 1244. He was consecrated on 26 February 1245. He was an eloquent preacher, and showed generosity to the poor (during one famine, even selling some of his own goods in order to provide them with food).

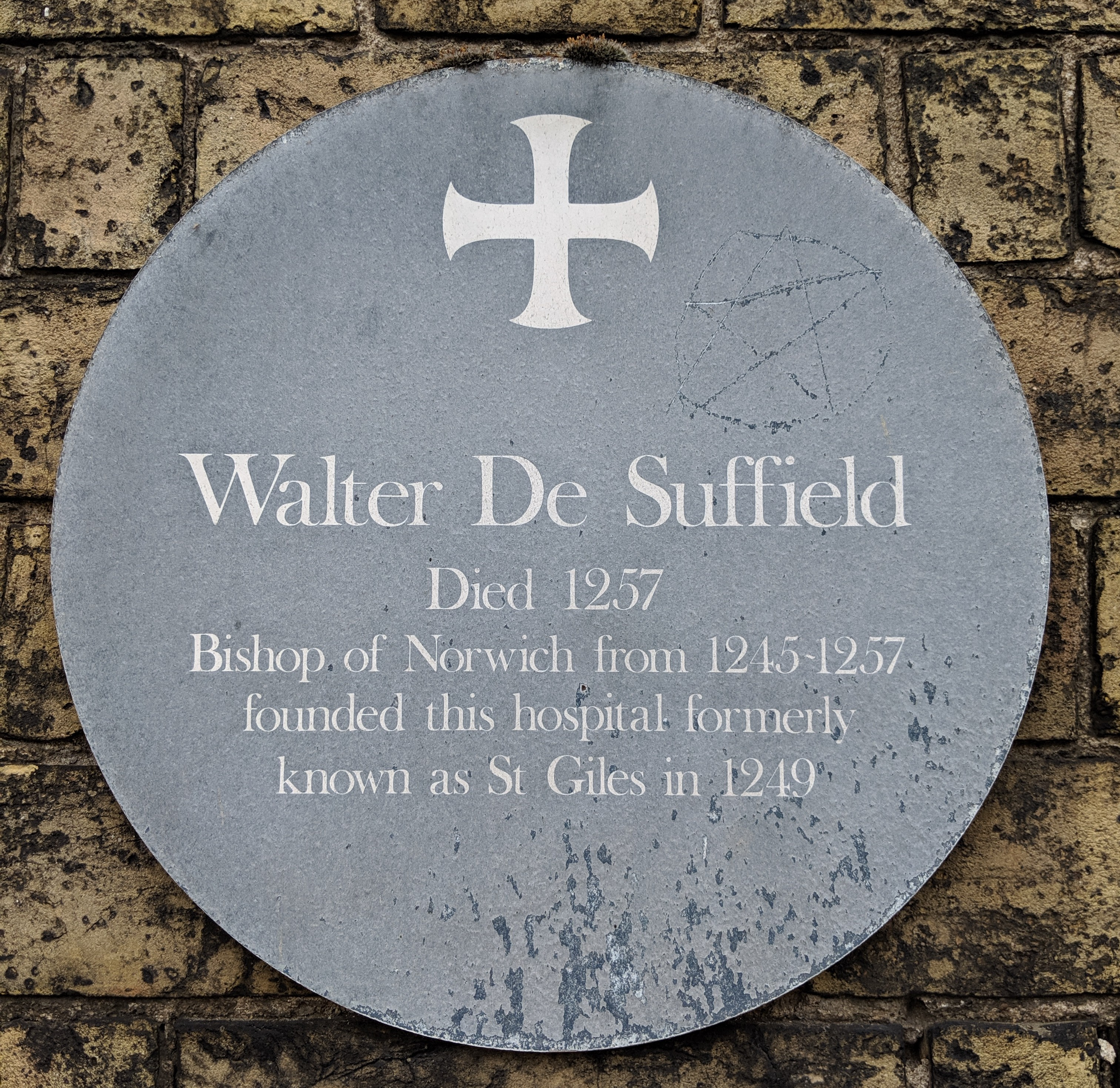
Suffield's plaque in Bishopgate, Norwich, NR1 1AA

In 1249, he founded St. Giles's Hospital in Norwich (which remains in use as the Great Hospital to this day) to provide care for the poor.

He has been reported as visiting his bishop's palace at South Elmham Hall where he enjoyed the hunting.

He died on 19 May 1257, leaving bequests to both the poor and the hospital.

== Citations ==
Catholic Church titles
Preceded by William de Raley	Bishop of Norwich; 1244–1257	Succeeded by Simon Walton
