= William de Ramsey =

14th-century English Gothic architect

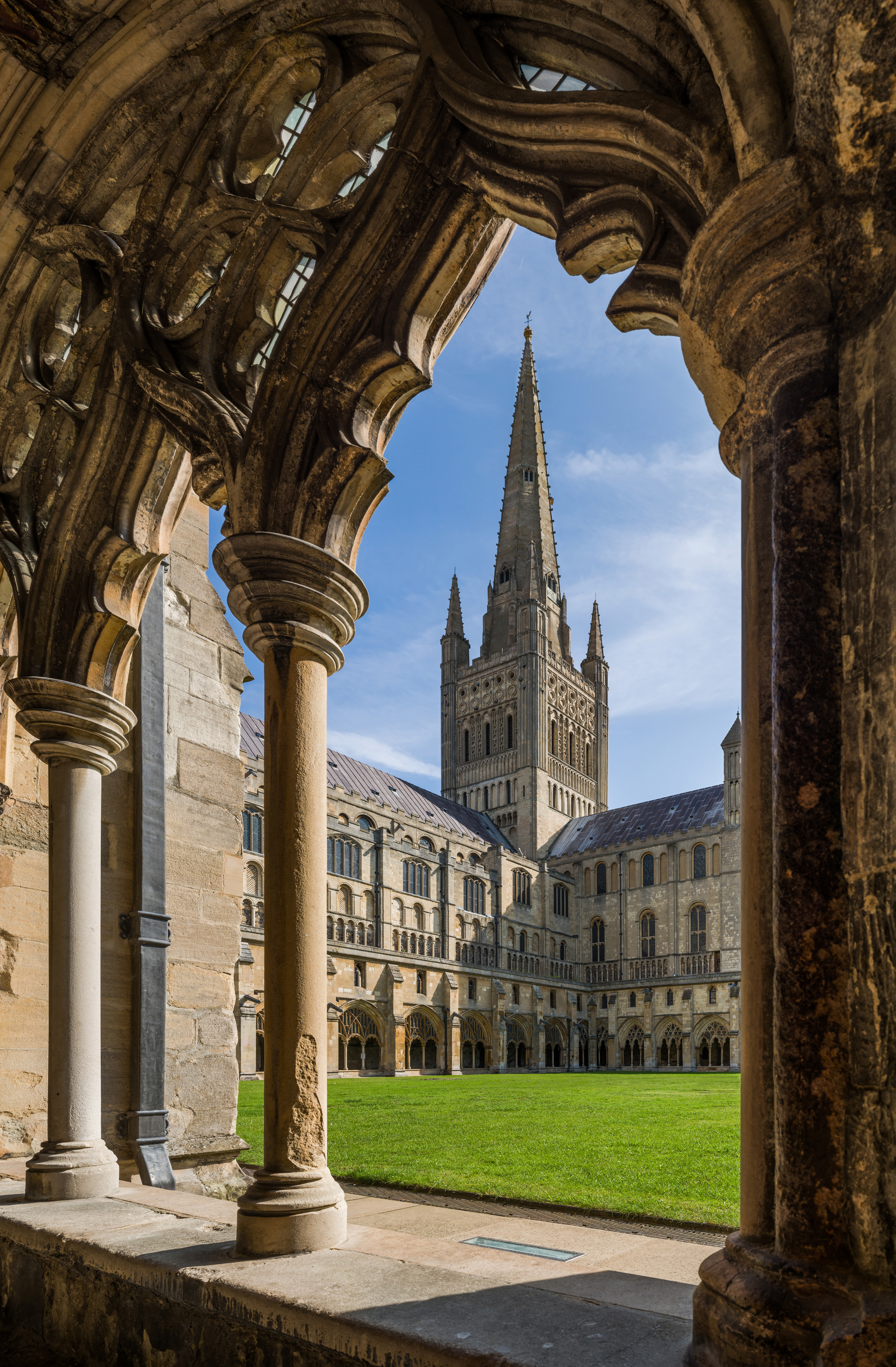
Stonework in the cloister of Norwich Cathedral, Norfolk

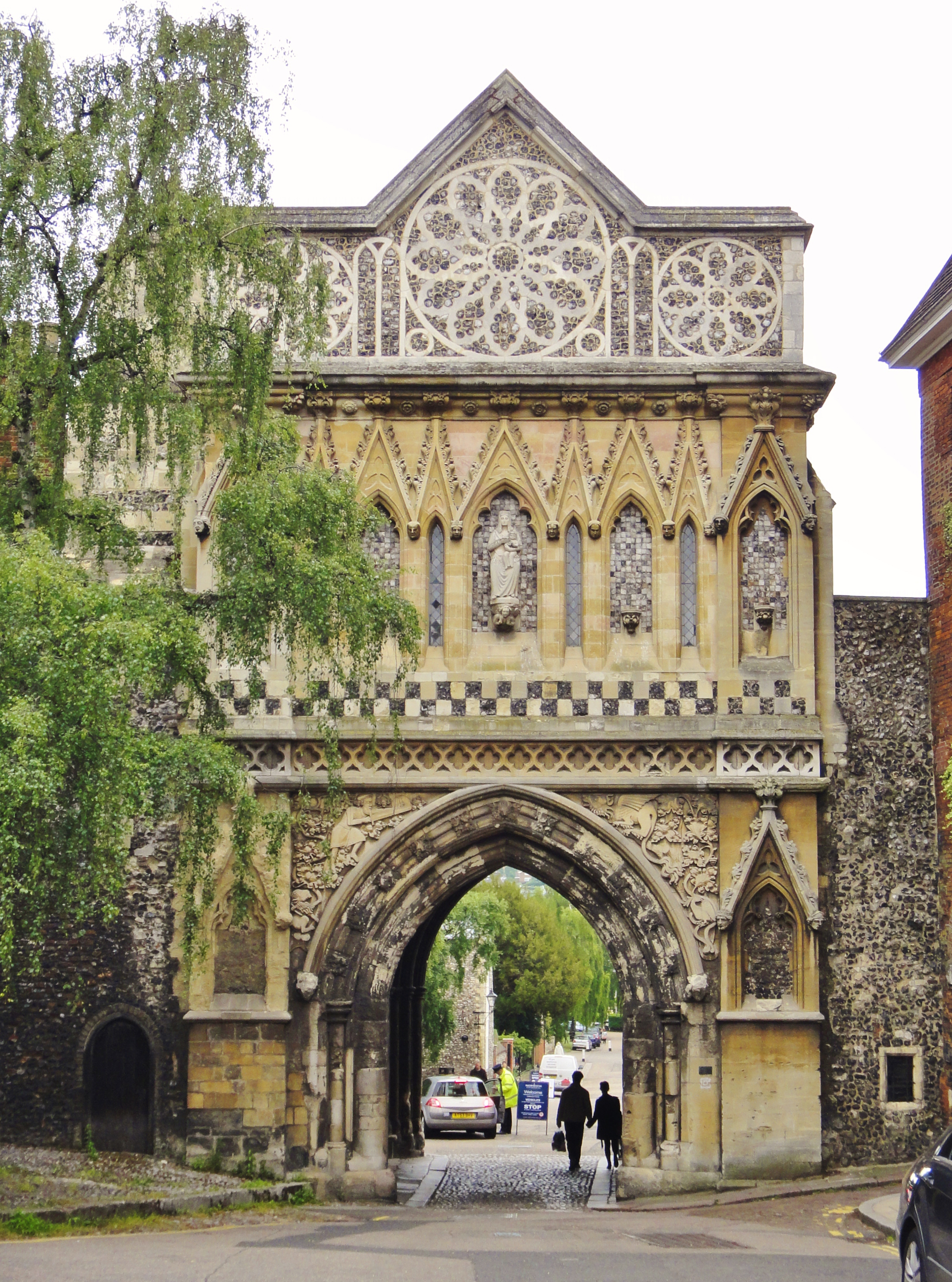
St Ethelbert's Gate, Norwich

William de Ramsey (fl. 1323 – 1349) was an English Gothic master mason and architect who worked on and probably designed the two earliest buildings of the Perpendicular style of Gothic architecture. William Ramsey is thought to have been one of the originators of the Perpendicular style which was to dominate Gothic architecture in England for three centuries "and, if so, he was one of the most influential architects England has ever produced".

== Life ==
The son of John de Ramsey, Master of Works at Norwich Cathedral and probable builder at Ely Cathedral (1324–30), William Ramsey began his career in the 1320s, working with his father on the cloisters at Norwich and probably on the chapel above the St Ethelbert's Gate to the cathedral close. In 1323 he was working on St Stephen's Chapel (since destroyed) at the old Palace of Westminster. He was also a consultant ('Visiting Master') at Norwich's Cathedral between 1326 and 1331. In 1332 he designed the chapter house (since destroyed) at Old St Paul's Cathedral in London. In 1337 he was consulted on the design of the presbytery of Lichfield Cathedral and was charged with supervising building at Stephen's Chapel the same year. The chapter house at St Paul's and St Stephen's in Westminster are known from existing fragments and contemporary illustrations to have been in Perpendicular style, the first buildings to have been built this way.

In 1335 he was one of four commissioners responsible for a report on the Tower of London. The following year, he was made Chief Mason of the Tower and Chief Surveyor of the King's Works there and for all castles south of the River Trent, a lifetime appointment. The great hall and other parts of Penshurst Place (1341–48) were probably his work.

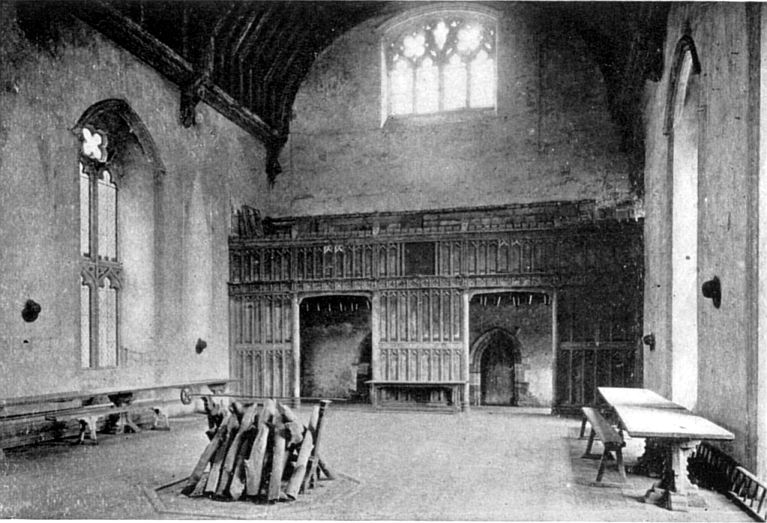
Great Hall, Penshurst Place, Kent

William de Ramsey was a scion of the de Ramsey family of master masons whose work, according to John Harvey, can be found at Ramsey Abbey, Norwich Cathedral, Ely Cathedral, and possibly also in Paris. Ramsey died of plague in 1349, during the Black Death. William Ramsey's daughter, Agnes Ramsey, carried on his workshop after his death.

== Works ==
- Chapter House of St. Paul's Cathedral, City of London, Greater London
- St Stephen's Chapel, Westminster, Greater London
- Penshurst Place, Penshurst, Kent
- St Margaret's Church, Cley next the Sea, Norfolk
- St Ethelbert's Gate, Norwich, Norfolk

== Bibliography ==
- "William de Ramsey". encyclopedia.com.
- Harvey, John (1946). Henry Yevele: The Life of an English Architect. London: B.T. Batsford.
