= Simon Walton (bishop) =

13th-century Bishop of Norwich

Simon Walton (or Simon de Wanton; died 2 January 1266) was an English clergyman who served as the Bishop of Norwich.

== Life ==
A royal justice, Walton was elected to the see of Norwich on 4 June 1257 and was consecrated on 10 March 1258. He was enthroned at Norwich Cathedral on 17 March 1258.

Pope Clement IV ordered Walton to find a coadjutor on 29 September 1265, as the bishop was sick and unable to perform his duties. He died on 2 January 1266.

== Citations ==
Catholic Church titles
| Preceded by Walter Suffield | Bishop of Norwich; 1257–1266 | Succeeded by Roger Skerning |
