= William Middleton (bishop) =

13th-century Bishop of Norwich

- Bishop of Norwich
- Elected: 24 February 1278
- Installed: 27 November 1278
- Term ended: either 31 August or 1 September 1288
- Predecessor: Roger Skerning
- Successor: Ralph Walpole
- Other posts: Archdeacon of Canterbury

Orders
- Consecration: 29 May 1278 by Archbishop Robert Kilwardy, O.P., with unknown co-consecrators

Personal details
- Died: either 31 August or 1 September 1288
- Denomination: Roman Catholic
- Profession: previously clerk; also administrator

William Middleton (or William de Middleton; died 31 August or 1 September 1288) was a medieval Bishop of Norwich.

== Life ==
Middleton began his career as a clerk in the Jewish exchequer in 1265. He was given custody of the rolls in 1276, and in 1277 was at the French royal court. He was an official of Canterbury when he was appointed Archdeacon of Canterbury by Archbishop Robert Kilwardby in October 1275. He may also have held a prebend in the diocese of London.

Middleton was elected on 24 February 1278 and was consecrated on 29 May 1278. He was enthroned at Norwich Cathedral on 27 November 1278. He continued to work on royal administrative business after his election and consecration.

In July 1287 Middleton was appointed to the offices of Seneschal of Gascony and Lieutenant of the Duchy of Aquitaine. He died 31 August or 1 September 1288.

== Citations ==
Catholic Church titles
| Preceded by Roger Skerning | Bishop of Norwich; 1278–1288 | Succeeded by Ralph Walpole |
