= John de Ramsey =

English Gothic architect (fl. c.1304–1349)

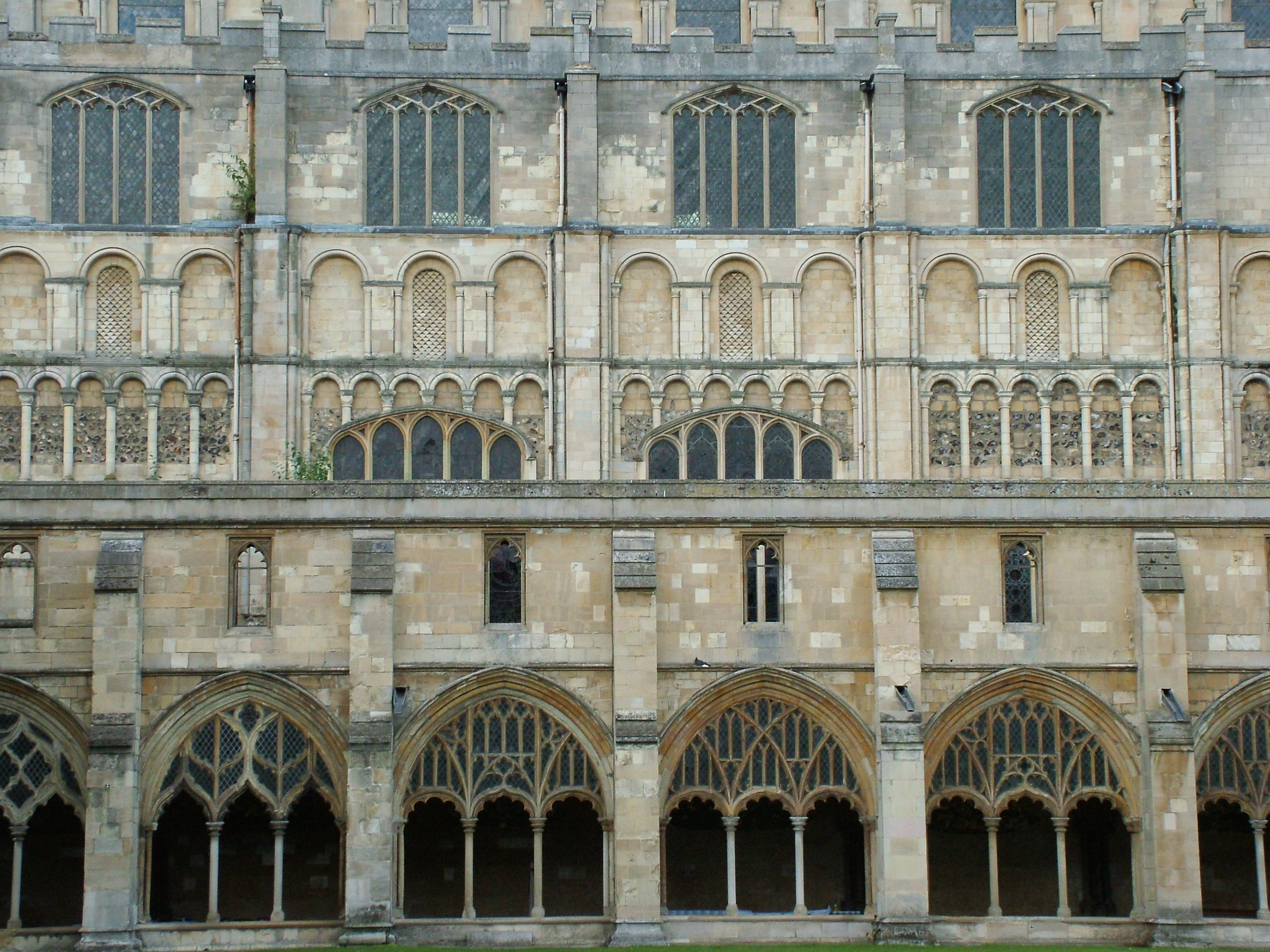
Cloisters at Norwich Cathedral, Norfolk

John de Ramsey (fl. c.1304–1349) was an English master mason and architect working in Gothic architecture in the Kingdom of England in the 14th century. He was Master of the Works at Norwich Cathedral in 1304, at which time a new detached belfry (now demolished) was under construction. It is possible that he designed the southern sections of the cathedral cloisters at Norwich, which he worked on between 1324 and 1330. At Ely, Cambridgeshire he was likely in charge of the Ely Cathedral's construction between about 1322 and 1326. John was also probably a sculptor. John de Ramsey was the son of Richard Curteys, likely the same Richard as Richard le Machun who was himself a mason at Norwich Cathedral (1285–90). In later life he appears to have been in London, where his son William de Ramsey was instrumental in the innovations of Perpendicular Gothic architecture.
