= Roger Skerning =

13th-century Bishop of Norwich

- Bishop of Norwich
- Elected: 23 January 1266
- Term ended: 22 January 1278
- Predecessor: Simon Walton
- Successor: William Middleton
- Other post: Prior of Norwich

Orders
- Consecration: 4 April 1266

Personal details
- Died: 22 January 1278
- Denomination: Roman Catholic

Roger Skerning (or Roger de Skerning; died 22 January 1278) was a medieval Bishop of Norwich.

== Life ==
Skerning was a monk of Norwich Cathedral before he was elected Prior of Norwich in 1257.

Skerning was elected to the see of Norwich on 23 January 1266 and was consecrated on 4 April 1266.

In 1276, William Freney, titular archbishop of Edessa, was acting as Skerning's suffragan in Norwich.

Skerning died on 22 January 1278.

== Citations ==
Catholic Church titles
Preceded by Simon Walton	Bishop of Norwich; 1266–1278	Succeeded by William Middleton
