= List of watermills in the United Kingdom =

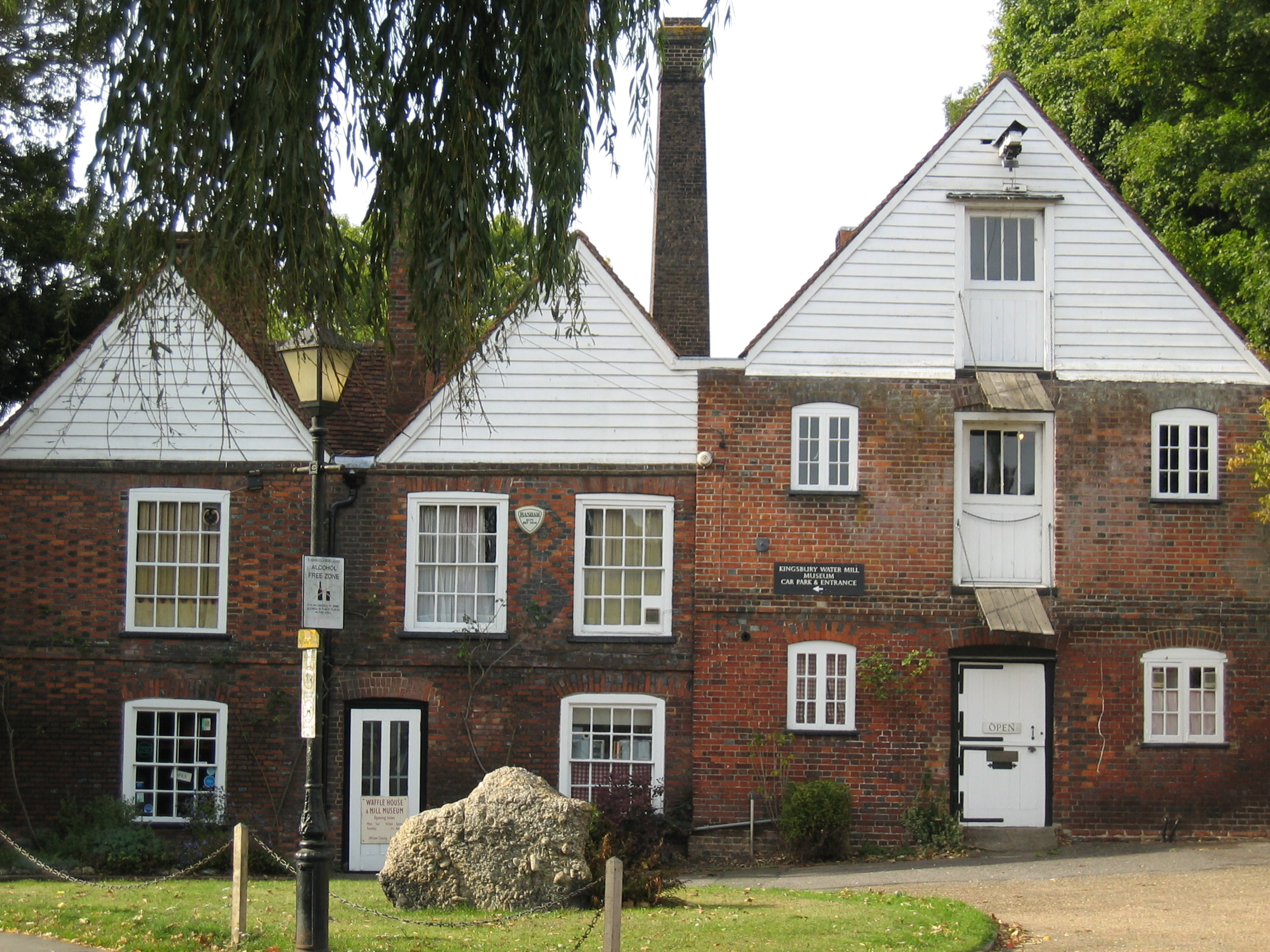
Kingsbury Watermill Museum, St Albans

The use of water power in Britain was at its peak just before the Industrial Revolution. The need for power was great and steam power had not yet become established. It is estimated that at this time there were well in excess of ten thousand watermills in the country. Most of these were corn mills (to grind flour), but almost any industrial process needing motive power, beyond that available from the muscles of men or animals, used a water wheel, unless a windmill was preferred.

Today only a fraction of these mills survive. Many are used as private residences, or have been converted into offices. At least one is now a whiskey distillery, and another is a gin distillery. A number have been preserved or restored as museums where the public can see the mill in operation.

This is a list of some of the surviving watermills and tide mills in the United Kingdom.

"The Lesson of the Water Mill"

Listen to the water mill
Through the livelong day;
How the clicking of the wheel
Wears the hours away.
Languidly the autumn wind
Stirs the withered leaves;
On the field the reapers sing
Binding up the sheaves;
And a proverb haunts my mind
And as a spell is cast,
"The mill will never grind
With the water that has passed."

— Sarah Doudney,

"Puck's Song"
Excerpt

See yon our little mill that clacks
so busy by the brook,
She has ground her corn and paid her tax
ever since Domesday Book.

— Rudyard Kipling,

== England ==
=== Bedfordshire ===
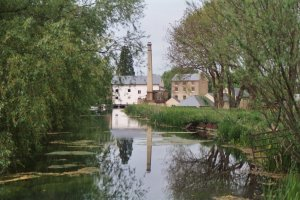
Stotfold Mill, Bedfordshire

- Bowman's Watermill, Astwick
- Bromham Watermill, Bromham
- Clophill Watermill, Clophill
- Franklin's Mill, Biggleswade
- Holme Mills, Holme
- Hulcote Mill, Hulcote
- Stotfold Mill, Stotfold
- The Olde Watermill, Barton-le-Clay

=== Berkshire ===
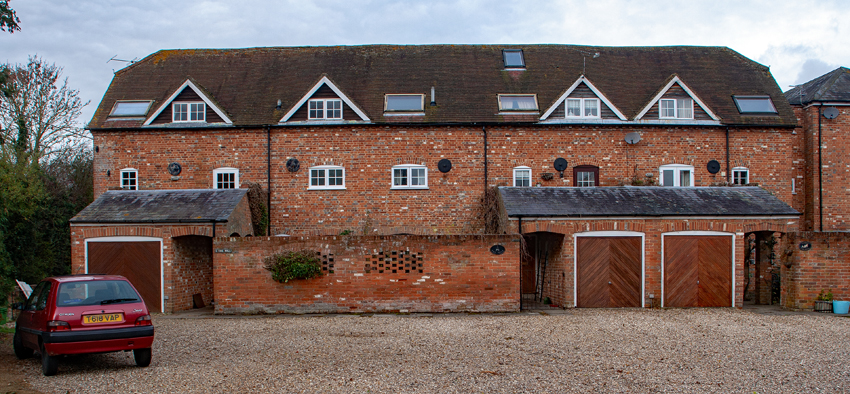
Chamberhouse Mill, Berkshire

- Abbey Mill, Reading
- Bagnor Mill, Bagnor (now occupied by the Watermill Theatre)
- Boxford Mill. Boxford
- Calcot Mill, Reading
- Chamberhouse Mill, Thatcham
- Dun Mill, Hungerford
- Denford Mill, Hungerford
- Eddington Mill, Eddington
- Hungerford Mill, Thatcham
- Sindlesham Mill, Reading
- Twyford Mill, Twyford
- Weston Mill, Weston

=== Buckinghamshire ===
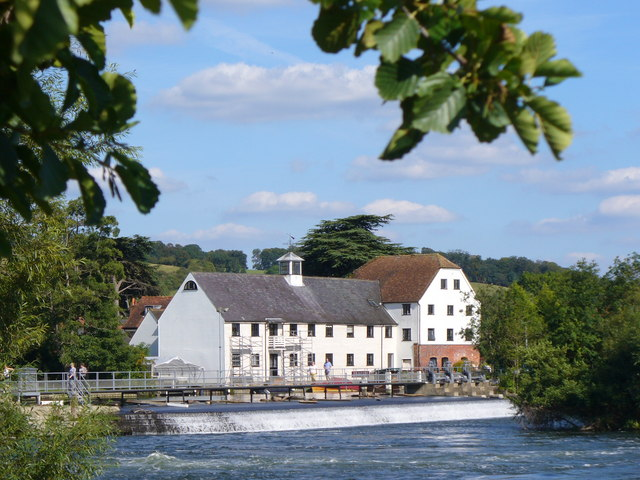
Hambleden Mill, Buckinghamshire

- Castlethorpe Mill, Castlethorpe
- Dodd's Mill, Chenies
- Ford End Mill, Ivinghoe
- Hambleden Mill, Hambleden
- Haversham Mill, Haversham
- Pann Mill, High Wycombe

=== Cambridgeshire ===
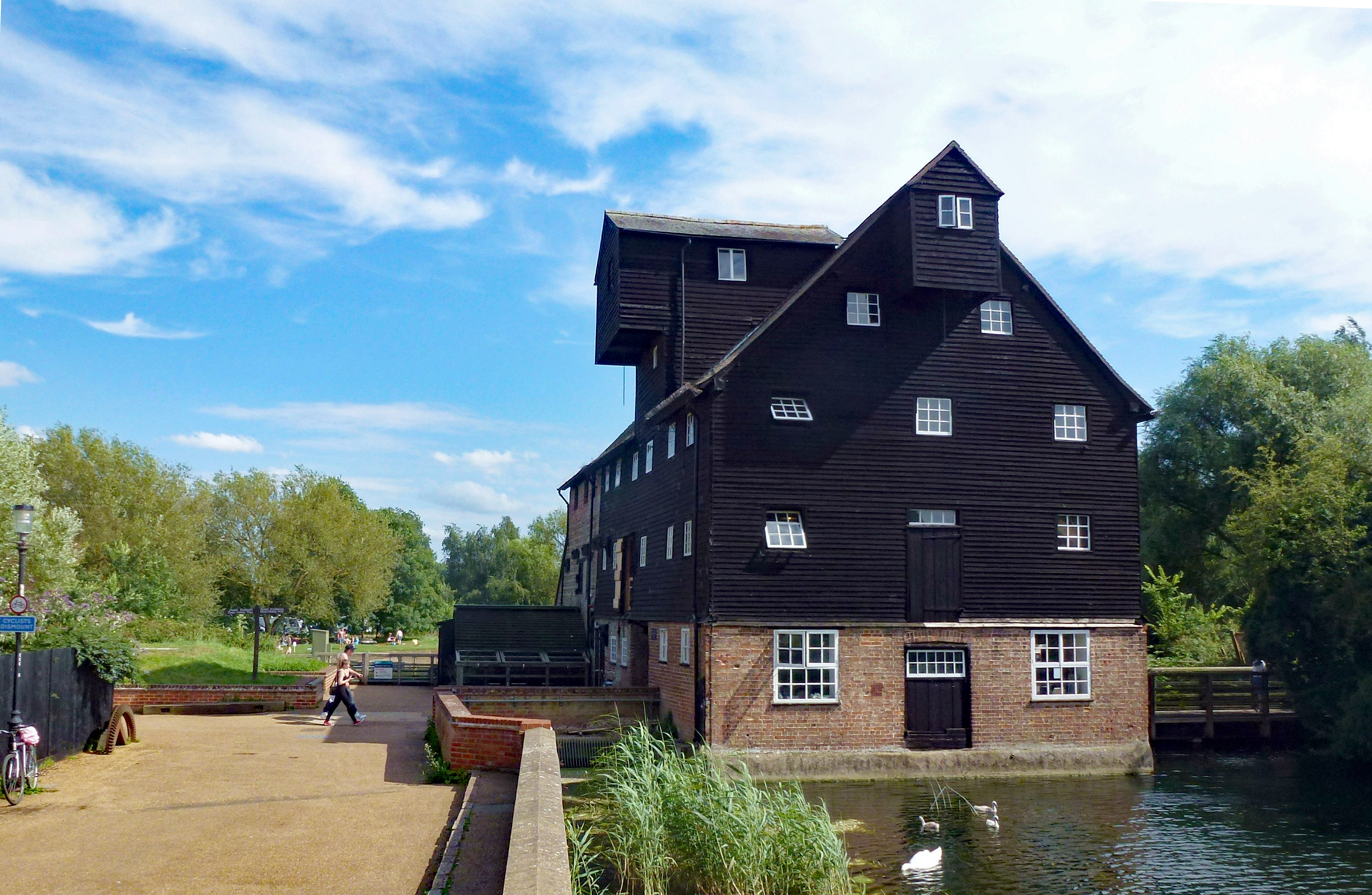
Houghton Mill, Cambridgeshire

- Elton Mill, Elton
- Hauxton Mill, Hauxton
- Hinxton Mill, Hinxton
- Hook's Mill, Guilden Morden
- Houghton Mill, Houghton
- Lode Watermill, Lode
- Maxey Mill, Maxey
- Old Mill, Water Newton
- Topcliffe Mill, Meldreth
- Sacrewell Mill, Peterborough
- Soham Mill, Soham

=== Cheshire ===
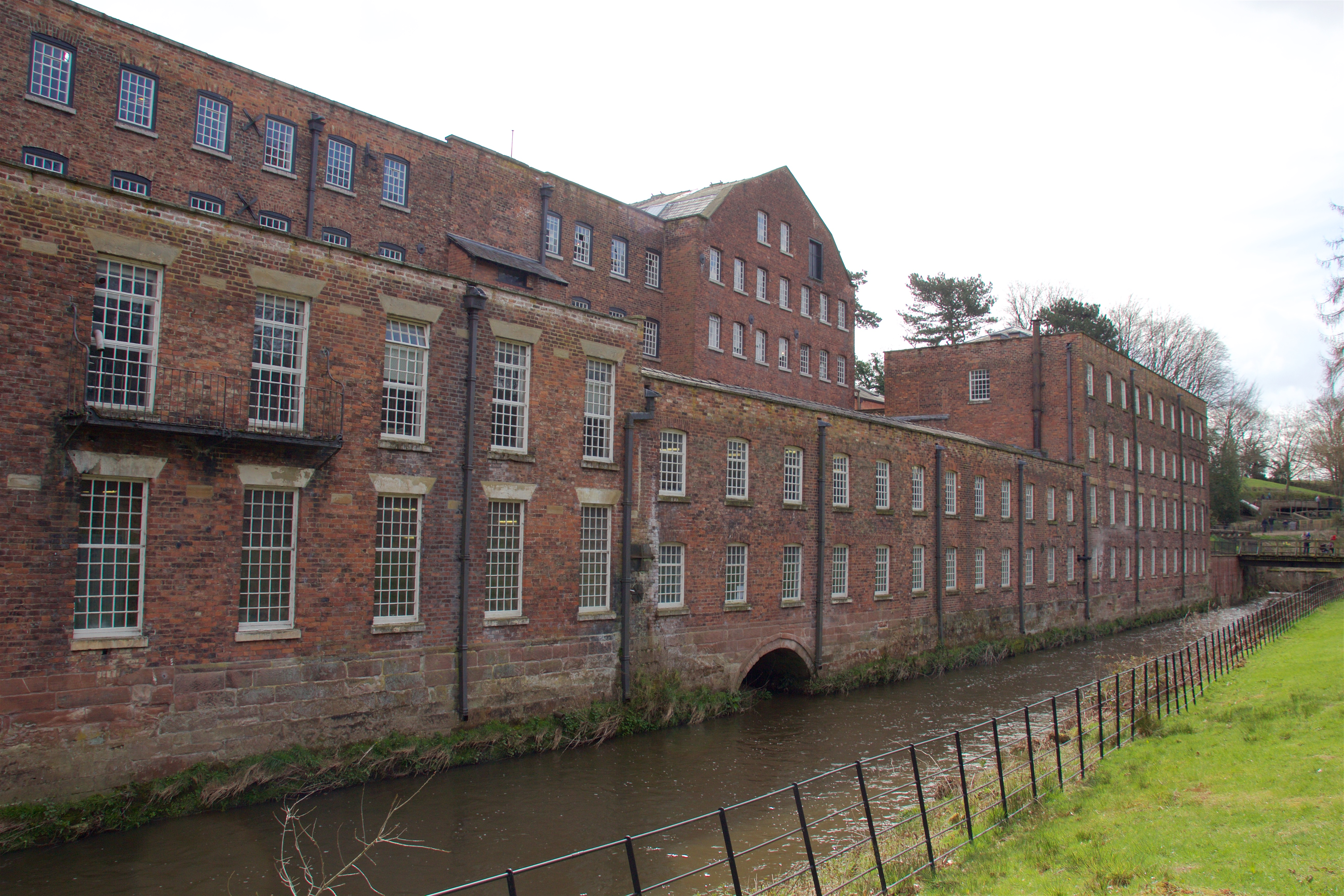
Quarry Bank Mill, Cheshire

- Bollington Mill, Bollington
- Bunbury Mill, Bunbury
- Church Minshull Mill, Church Minshull
- Dunham Massey Sawmill, Dunham Massey Hall
- Nantwich Mill, Nantwich
- Nether Alderley Mill, Macclesfield
- Quarry Bank Mill, Styal
- Stretton Watermill, Stretton
- Trafford Mill, Mickle Trafford, Chester
- Walk Mill, Waverton, Cheshire Built 2008

=== Cornwall ===
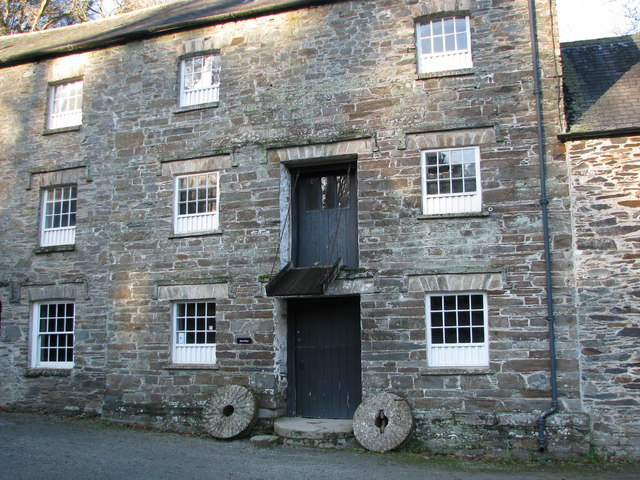
Cotehele Mill, Cornwall

- Bar Pool Mill, Falmouth
- Boscastle Mill, Boscastle
- Carbeal Tide Mill, Torpoint
- Carthew Mill, Carthew
- Cotehele Mill, Calstock
- Dinham Tide Mill, St Minver
- Gerrans Sea Mill, Gerrans
- Heskyn Mill, Tideford
- Hingham Mill, near Wadebridge
- Kestle Mill, Kestle
- Little Petherick Creek tide mill, Little Petherick
- Melinsay Mill, Veryan
- Penpoll tidemill, Feock
- Perranarworthal Manor Mill, Perranarworthal
- Poltesco Higher Mill, Ruan Minor
- Poltesco Lower Mill, Ruan Minor
- Polvellan or Pool Tide Mill, Looe
- Poughill Mill, Bude
- Salter Tide Mill, Saltash
- Tregarus Mill St Stephen
- Tregidden Mill, Tregidden
- Tregoose Old Mill St Columb Major
- Trevillett Mill, Tintagel
- Treway Mill, Zennor
- Trewen Mill, Trewen
- Wheal Martyn, Carthew

=== Cumbria ===
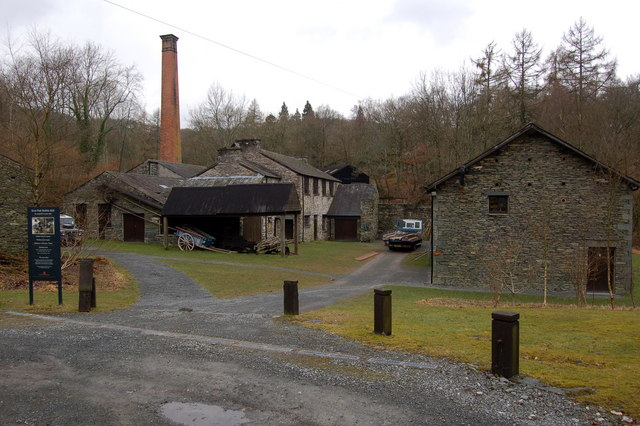
Stott Park Bobbin Mill, Cumbria

- Acorn Bank Mill, Penrith
- Beckside Mill, Kirkby-in-Furness
- Blennerhassett Mill, Aspatria
- Brampton Mill, Appleby
- Boot Watermill, Eskdale
- Gleaston Water Mill, Ulverston
- Heron Corn Mill, Milnthorpe
- High Mill, Alston
- Little Salkeld Watermill, Penrith
- Milton Mill, Crooklands
- Muncaster Mill, Ravenglass
- Old Fulling Mill, Ambleside
- Rutter Mill, Great Asby
- Sparket Mill, Hutton
- Stott Park Bobbin Mill, Ulverston
- Wythop Mill, Embleton

=== Derbyshire ===
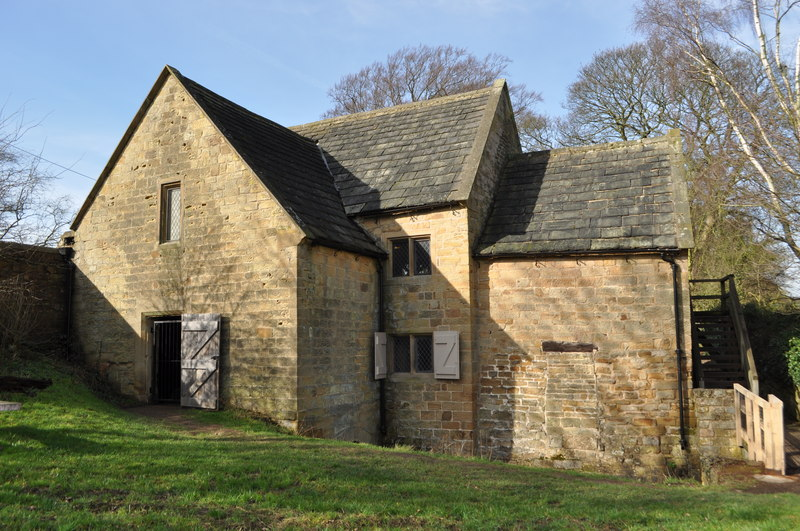
Stainsby Mill, Derbyshire

- Arkwrights Mill, Cromford
- Caudwells Mill, Rowsley
- Derby Silk Mill
- Haarlem Mill, Wirksworth
- Masson Mill, Matlock Bath
- Stainsby Mill, Chesterfield
- Lumsdale Mills, Matlock

=== Devon ===
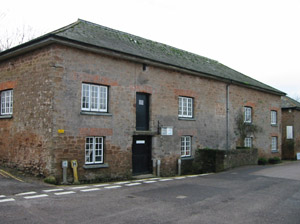
Otterton mill, Devon

- Bicclescombe Mill, Ilfracombe
- Bicklegh Mill, Tiverton
- Branscombe Manor Mill, Branscombe
- Clyston Mill, Broadclyst
- Coldharbour Mill, Cullompton
- Cricklepit Mill, Exeter
- Docton Mill, Hartland
- Finch Foundry, Okehampton
- Hele Mill, Hele Bay, Ilfracombe
- Manor Mill, Seaton
- Morwellham Quay, Gunnislake
- Otterton Mill, Budleigh Salterton
- Sidbury Mill, Sidbury
- Town Mills, Chudleigh
- Town Mill, Totnes

=== Dorset ===
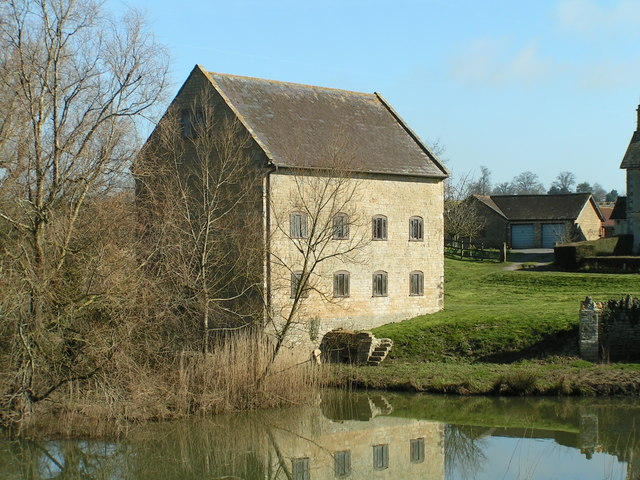
King's Mill, Dorset

- Boar Mill, Corfe Castle
- Cann Mill, Shaftesbury
- Castleton Water Wheel Museum, Sherborne
- Hembury Mill, Askerswell
- King's Mill, Marnhull
- Loverley Mill, Moor Crichel
- Maiden Newton Mill, Maiden Newton
- Mangerton Mill, Bridport
- Melbury Abbas Mill Shaftesbury
- Pegg's Farm Mill, Iwerne Minster
- Place Mill, Christchurch
- Sturminster Newton Mill, Sturminster Newton
- Town Mill, Lyme Regis
- White Mill, Sturminster Marshall
- Upwey Mill, Weymouth

=== Durham ===
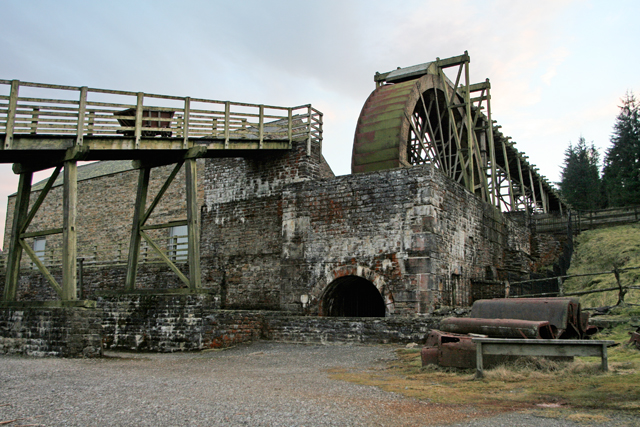
Killhope Wheel, Durham

- Brignall Mill, River Greta
- Killhope Wheel, Killhope
- Leap Mill Farm, Burnopfield
- Path Head Watermill, Blaydon
- Old Fulling Mill, Durham

=== East Sussex ===
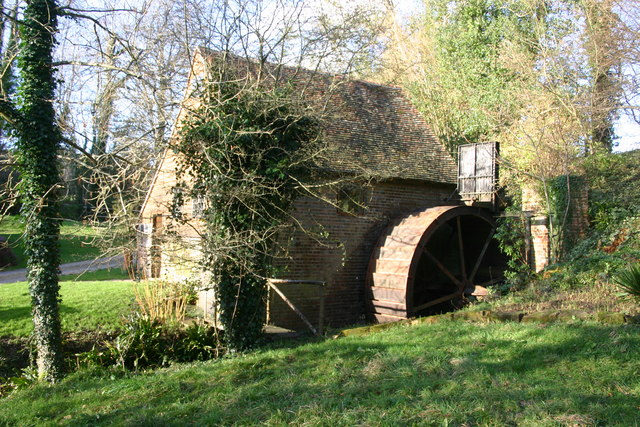
Sheffield Mill, East Sussex

- Bartley Mill, Bells Yew Green
- Bateman's Park Mill, Burwash
- Hellingly Watermill, Hellingly
- Michelham Priory Mill, Hailsham
- Park Mill, Etchingham
- Sheffield Mill, Furners Green
- Tide Mills, Newhaven
- See also:-
  - Medway watermills

=== East Yorkshire ===
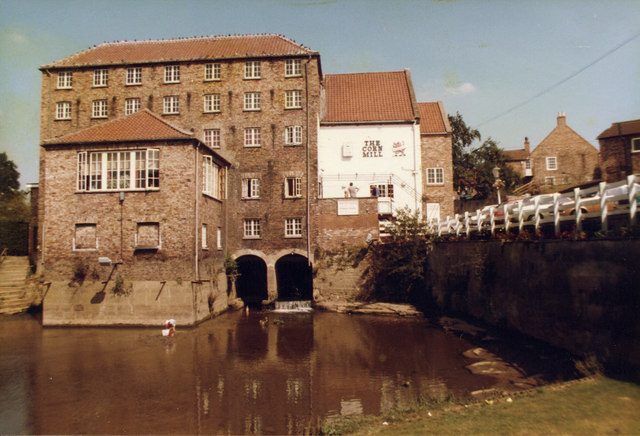
Stamford Bridge Mill, East Yorkshire

- Beswick Mill, Beswick
- Corn Mill, Stamford Bridge
- Old Mill, Sutton upon Derwent
- Welton High Mill, Welton

=== Essex ===
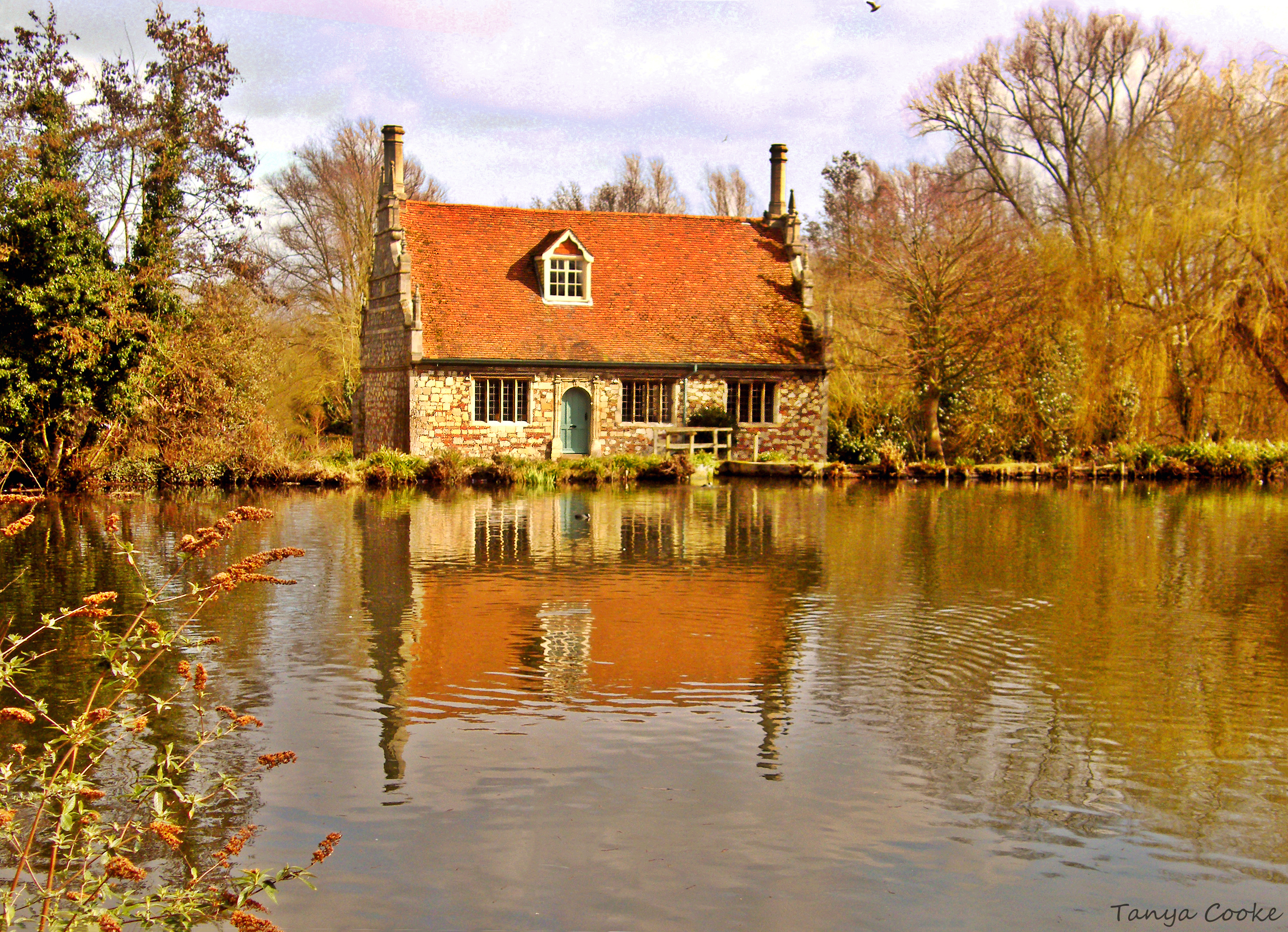
Bourne Mill, Essex

- Alderford Mill, Sible Hedingham
- Beeleigh Mill, Maldon
- Bourne Mill, Colchester
- Bran End Mill, Stebbing
- Easterford Mill, Kelvedon
- Elmbridge Mill, Little Easton,
- Felsted Mill, Felsted
- Fyfield Mill, Fyfield
- Harlow Mill, Harlow
- Hartford End Mill, Hartford End
- Hylands Mill Hylands Park
- Little Hallingbury Mill, Little Hallingbury
- Little Parndon Mill, Little Parndon
- Roydon Mill, Roydon
- Roxwell Mill, Roxwell
- Stebbing Town Mill, Stebbing
- Thorrington Tide Mill, Thorrington
- Tilty Mill, Tilty Abbey
- Writtle Mill, Writtle

=== Gloucestershire ===
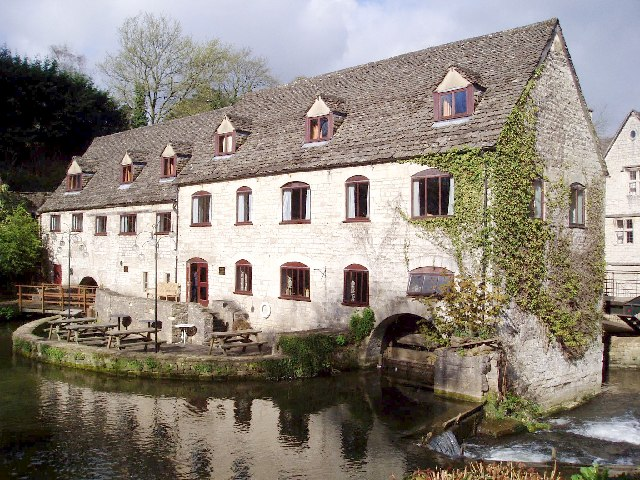
Egypt Mill, Gloucestershire

- Arlington Mill, Bibury
- Dean Heritage Centre, Cinderford
- Egypt Mill, Nailsworth
- Kilcott Mill, Hillesley
- Little Aston Mill, Upper Slaughter
- Old Mill, Lower Slaughter
- Owlpen Manor, Owlpen
- Stanway Watermill, Stanway, Cheltenham
- Syreford Mill, Andoversford

=== Greater London ===
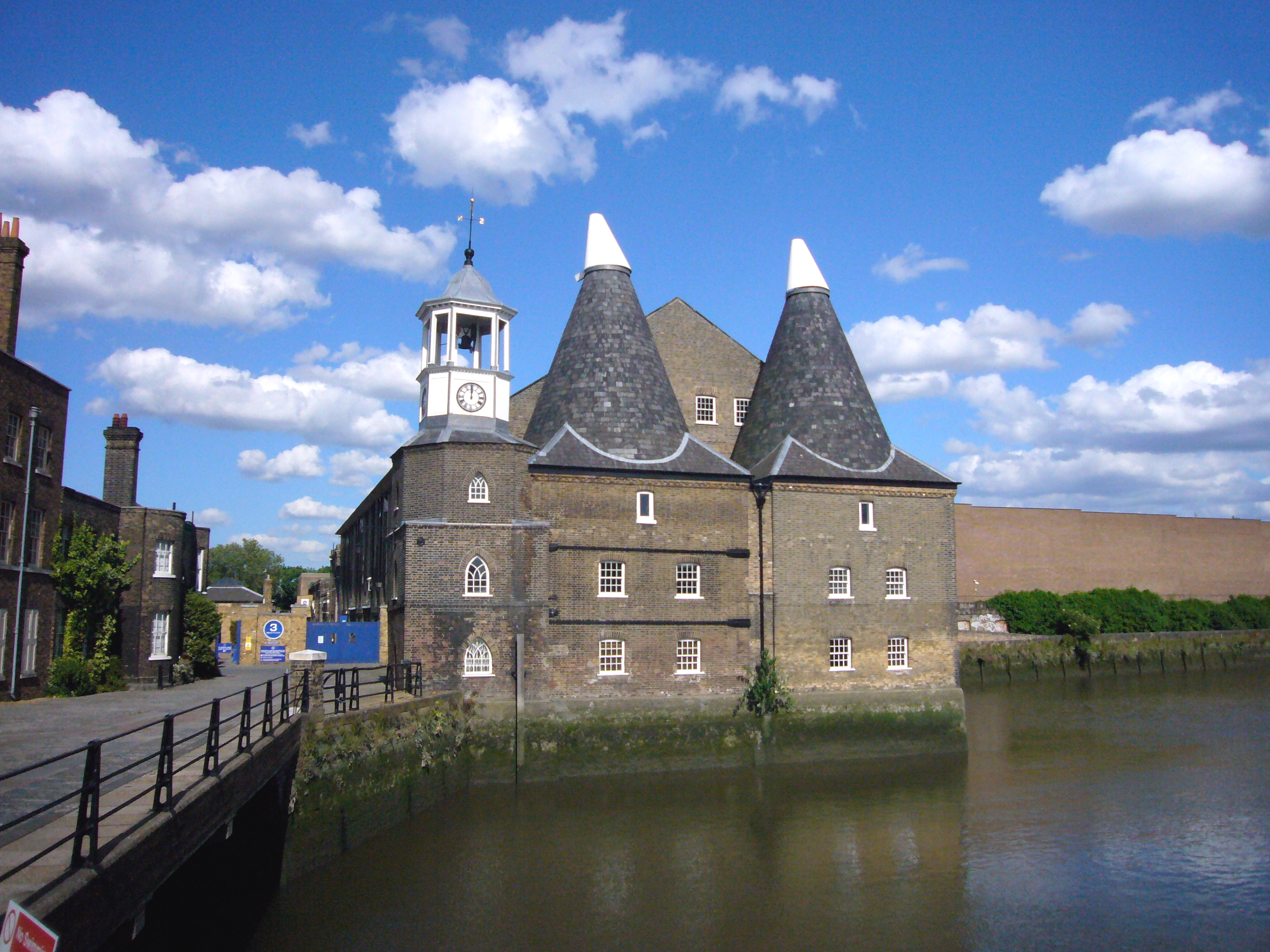
Clock Mill, Greater London

- Butter Hill Mill, Carshalton
- Clock Mill, Bromley-by-Bow
- House Mill, Bromley-by-Bow
- Merton Abbey Mills, Merton
- Ravensbury Mill, Morden
- Upper Mill, Carshalton

=== Hampshire ===
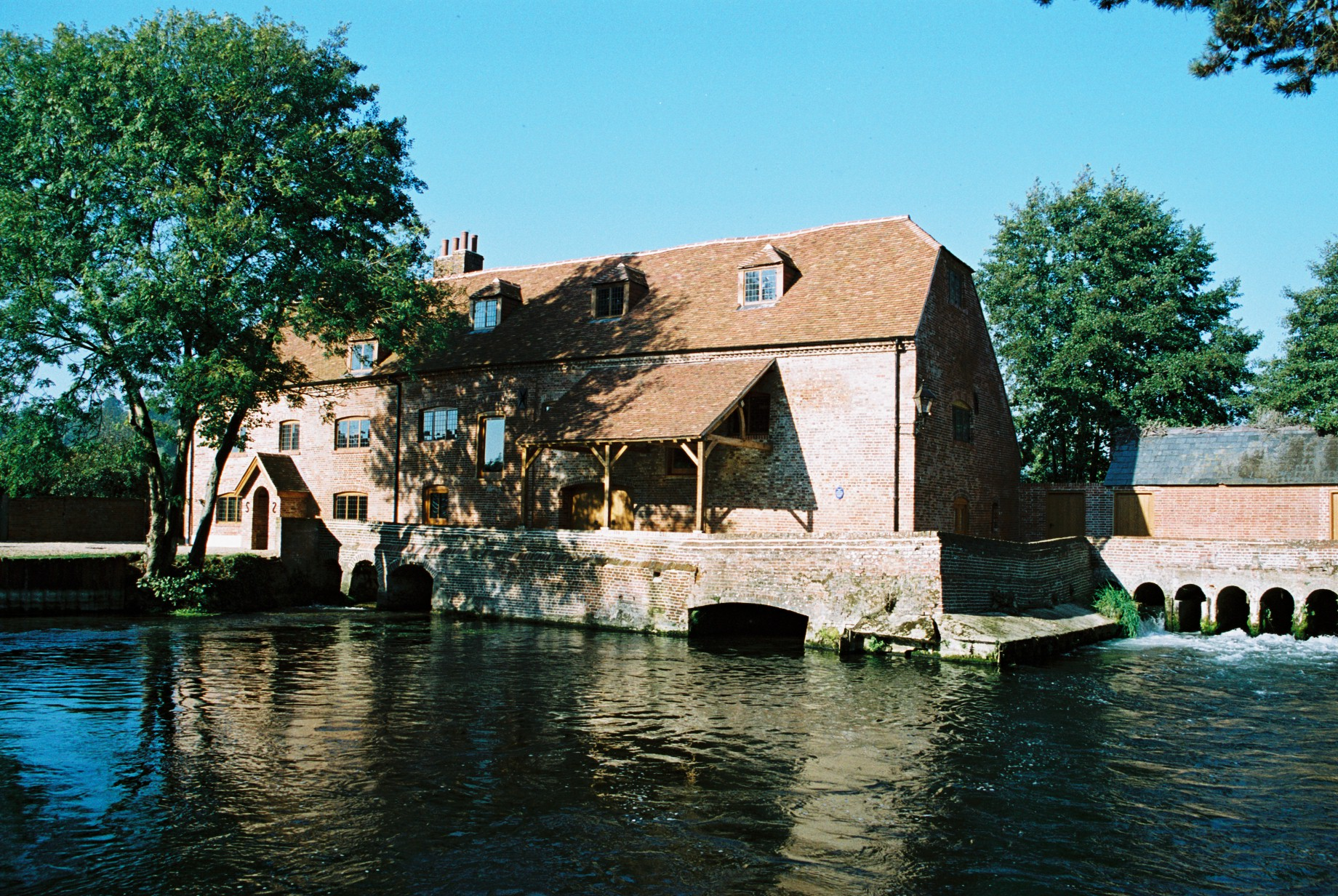
Sadler's Mill, Hampshire

- Abbey Mill, Bishops Waltham
- Abbey Mill, Winchester
- Alderholt Mill, Fordingbridge
- Anstey Mill, Alton
- Ashlett Mill, Fawley
- Barton's Mill, Old Basing
- Beaulieu Tide Mill, Beaulieu
- Beaurepair Mill, Sherborne St John
- Botley Mill, Botley
- Chase Mill, Bishops Waltham
- Chesapeake Mill, Wickham, Hampshire
- College Mill, Winchester
- Durley Mill, Botley
- Eling Tide Mill, Eling
- Fulling Mill, Old Alresford
- Gaters Mill, West End
- Greatham Mill, Greatham
- Greywell Mill, Greywell
- Hartley Mill, Hartley Wespall
- Headley Water Mill, Headley
- Hockley Mill, Twyford
- Isington Mill, Binstead
- Laverstoke Mill, Laverstoke
- Longbridge Mill, Sherfield on Loddon
- Lower Mill, Old Basing
- Lower Neatham Mill, Alton
- Monxton Mill, Monxton
- New Mill, Eversley
- Nether Wallop Mill Nether Wallop
- Old Mill, Selborne
- Paulton's Park Sawmill, Paultons Park
- Pilcot Mill Dogmersfield
- Quay Mill, Emsworth
- Rooksbury Mill, Andover
- St Cross Mill, Winchester
- Sadler's Mill, Romsey
- Shawford Mill, Shawford
- Town Mills, Andover
- Turk's Farm Mill, Bentley, Hampshire
- Upper Mill, Longparish
- Weir Mill, Old Alresford
- Wharf Mill, Winchester
- Whitchurch Silk Mill, Whitchurch
- Winchester City Mill, Winchester
- Woodmill, Southampton

=== Hertfordshire ===
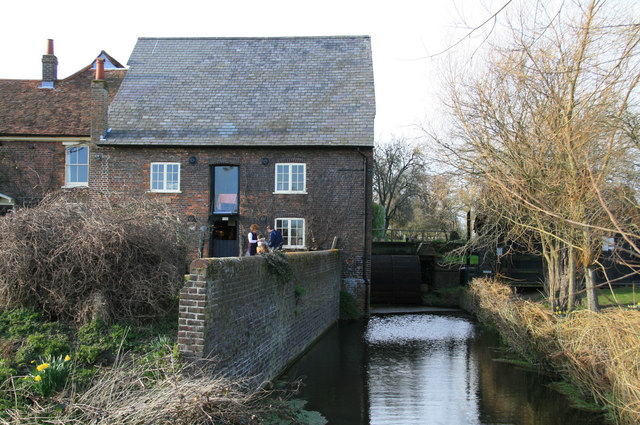
Redbournbury Mill, Hertfordshire

- Kingsbury Watermill, St Albans
- Mill Green Watermill, Hatfield
- Moor Mill, Bricket Wood
- New Barnes Mill, St Albans
- Park Mill, St Albans
- Pre Mill, St Albans
- Redbournbury Mill, Redbourn
- Shafford Mill, St Albans
- Sopwell Mill, St Albans

=== Isle of Wight ===
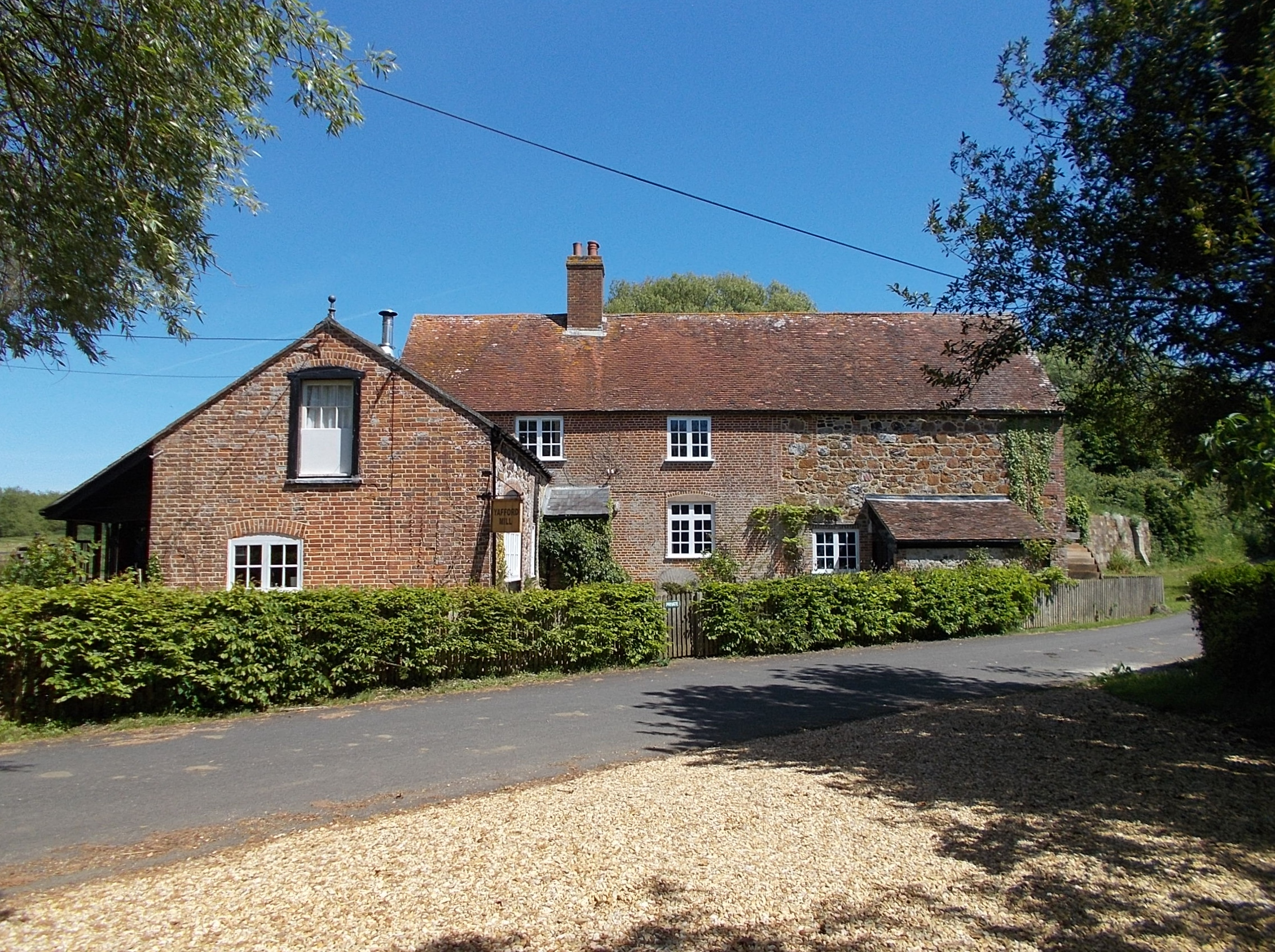
Yafford Mill, Isle of Wight

- Calbourne Mill, Calbourne
- Gatcome Mill, Gatcombe
- Lower Calbourne Mill, Calbourne
- Pan Mill, Newport
- St Cross Mill, Newport
- St Helens Tidal Mill St Helens
- Tidal Mill, Yarmouth
- Yafford Mill, Yafford

=== Kent ===
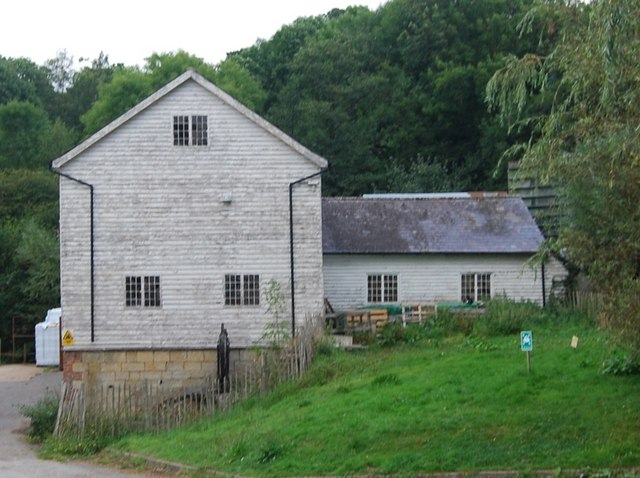
Bradley's Mill, Kent

- Ashbourne Mill, Tenterden
- Bartley Mill, Frant
- Bradley's Mill, Speldhurst
- Chilham Mill, Chilham
- Christmas Mill, Edenbridge
- Crabble Corn Mill, Dover
- Chart Gunpowder Mills, Faversham
- Furnace Mill, Lamberhurst
- Hever Watermill, Hever (Medway)
- Hope Mill, Goudhurst
- Hythe Watermill, Hythe
- Periwinkle Mill, Milton Regis
- Swanton Mill, Mersham (Stour)
- Ryarsh Mill, Ryarsh (Medway)
- Wandle Mill, Benenden

=== Lancashire ===
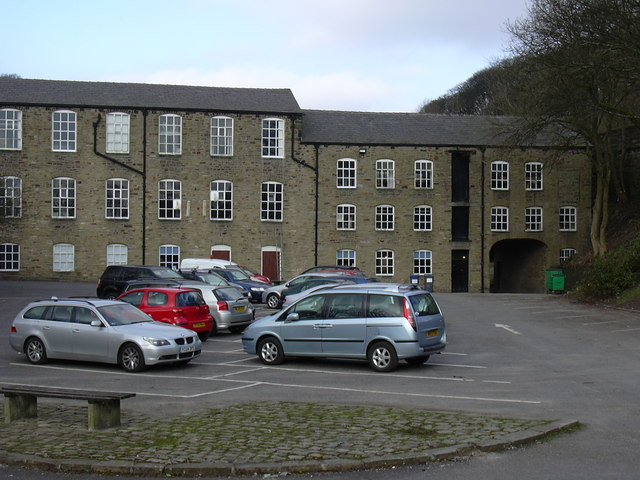
Higher Mill, Lancashire

- Higher Mill, Helmshore, Rossendale
- Thurnham Mill, Conder Green
- Forge Bank Mill, Halton

=== Leicestershire ===
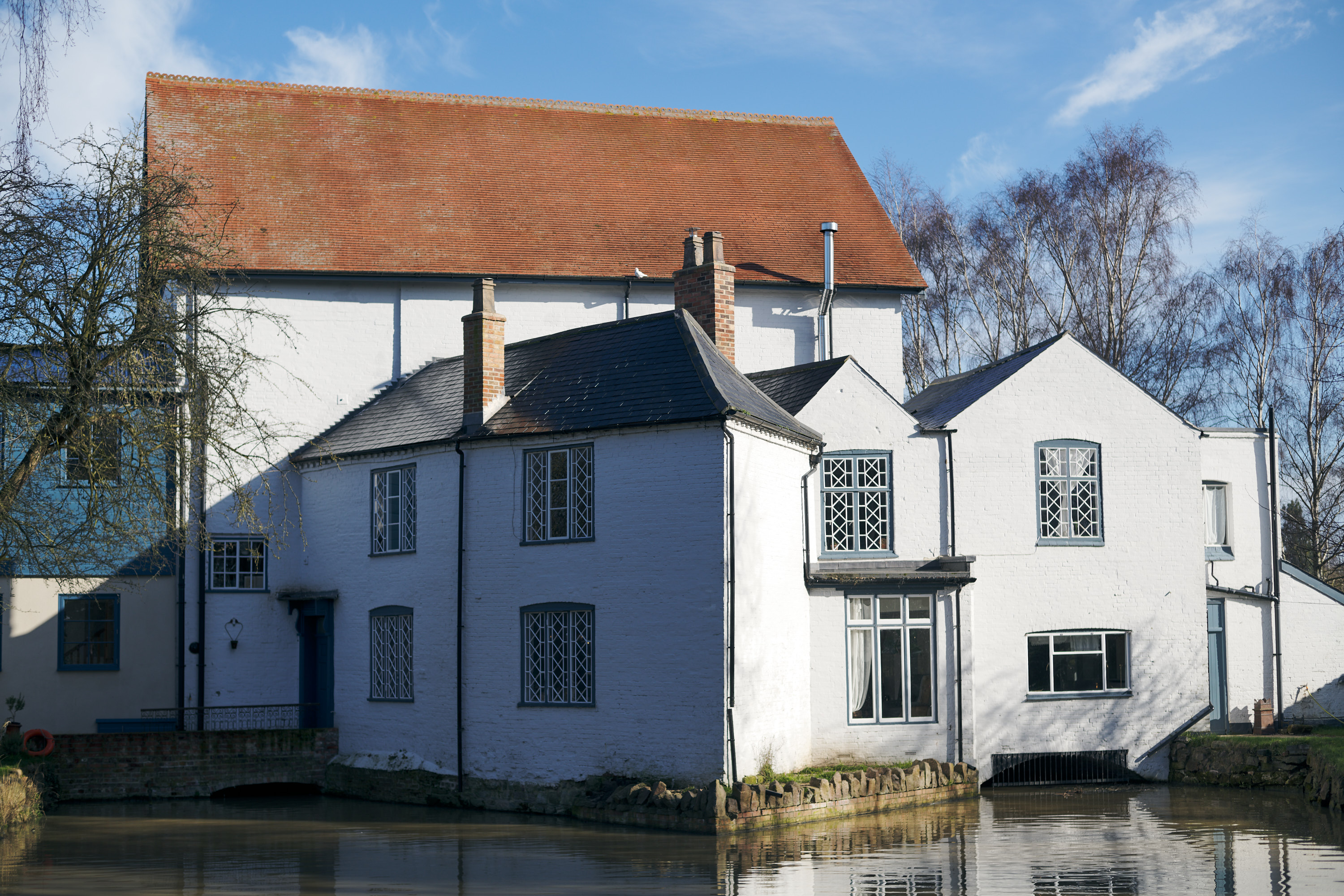
Cotes Mill, Leicestershire

- Claybrooke Mill, Claybrooke Magna
- Cotes Mill, Cotes
- Mill On The Soar, Broughton Astley
- Shepshed Watermill, Shepshed
- Glenfield Watermill Glenfield

=== Lincolnshire ===
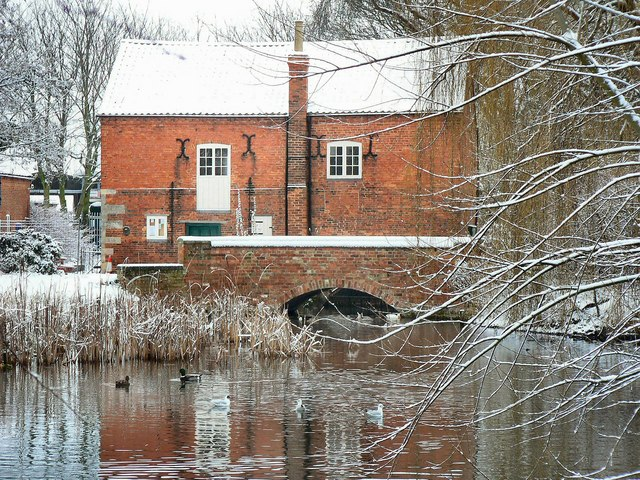
Cogglesford Mill, Lincolnshire

- Alvingham Mill, Alvingham
- Atkin's Mill, Scopwick
- Baines Mill, Louth
- Baldock's Mill, Bourne
- Bridge Street Mill, Louth
- Church Mill, Market Rasen
- Claypole Mill, Claypole
- Claythorpe Mill, Aby
- Cogglesford Mill, Sleaford
- Crown Mill, Louth
- Hibaldstow Wind and Water Mill, Hibaldstow
- Holdingham Mill, Holdingham
- Hubbards Hill Mill, Louth
- Hudd's Mill, Stamford
- James Street Mill, Louth
- Ketsby Mill, South Ormsby
- King's Mill, Stamford
- Londonthorpe Mill, Manthorpe
- Manor Mill, Kirkby Green
- Molecey's Mill West Deeping
- Spittlegate Mill, Grantham
- Stevenson's Mill, Horncastle
- Stockwith Mill, Hagworthingham
- Tealby Thorpe Mill, Tealby
- Tetford Mill, Tetford
- Thoresway Waterwheel, Thoresway
- Tyson's Mill, Tealby
- Westgate Mill, Louth
- Whitton's Mill, Gainsborough
- Young's Mill, Kirkby Green

=== Norfolk ===
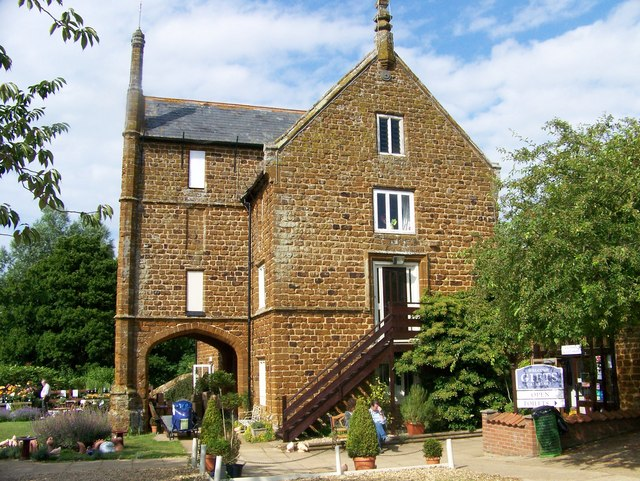
Caley Mill aka Heacham Mill, Norfolk

- Aldborough Watermill on Scarrow Beck
- Bintry Watermill on the River Wensum
- Bolwick Hall Watermill on the Mermaid
- Buxton Watermill on the River Bure
- Congham Oil Mill near Congham
- Eade's Watermill at Great Witchingham
- Foulden Mill, Foulden
- Gimingham Watermill on the River Mun
- Glandford Watermill on the River Glaven
- Gresham Watermill, Gresham,
- Gunton Park Sawmill, Gunton Park
- Heacham Watermill
- Hempstead Watermill
- Kettle Watermill, King's Lynn
- Letheringsett Watermill, Holt
- Letheringsett Brewery watermill
- Little Cressingham Wind and Water Mill, Little Cressingham
- Mundesley Watermill on the River Mun
- Narborough Bone Mill on the River Nar
- Sheringham Watermill, Sheringham
- Snettisham Watermill, Snettisham
- Weybourne Watermill

=== Northamptonshire ===
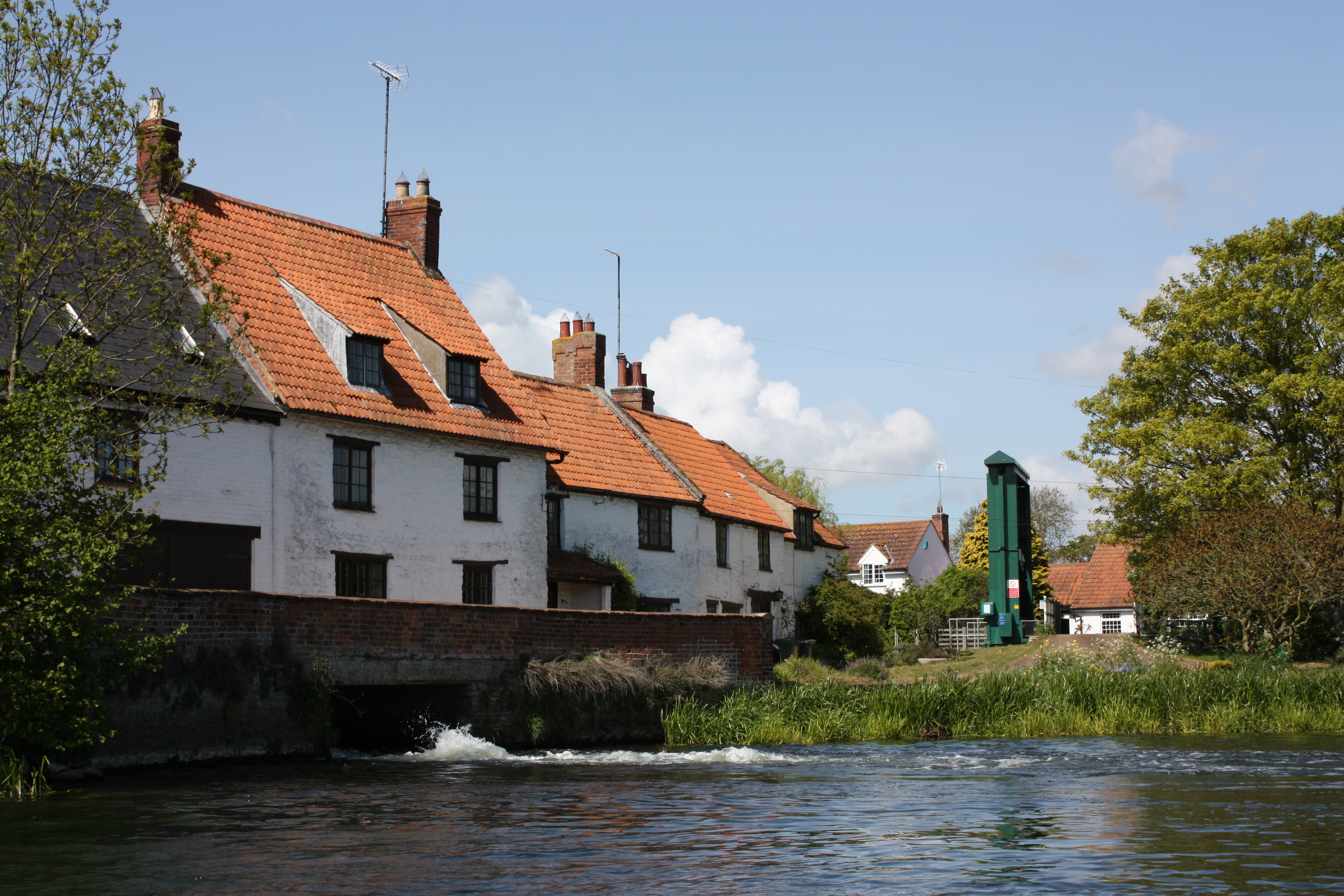
HardwaterMill, Northamptonshire

- Ashton Mill, Oundle
- Billing Mill, Billing
- Hardwater Mill, Great Doddington
- Towcester Mill, Towcester

=== North Yorkshire ===
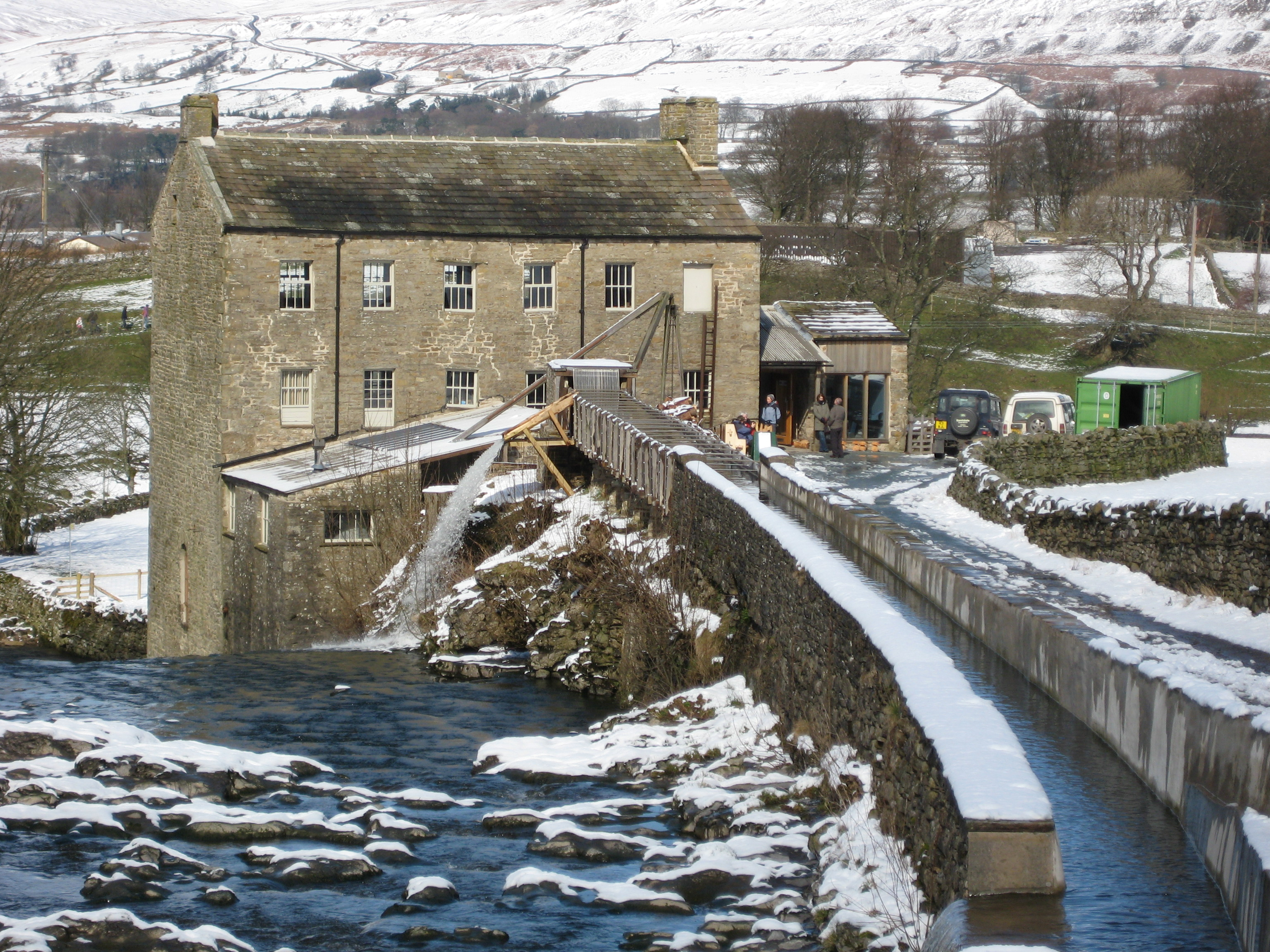
Gayle Mill, North Yorkshire

- Darley Mill Centre, Nidderdale
- Esk Mill, Danby
- Fountains Abbey Mill, Ripon
- Gayle Mill, Hawes, Wensleydale
- Howsham Mill, Malton
- Low Mill, Bainbridge
- Low Mill, Bilsdale
- Low Mill, Keighley
- Pateley Bridge Watermill, Nidderdale
- Raindale Mill, York
- Tocketts Mill, Guisborough
- The Mill, West Burton

=== Northumberland ===
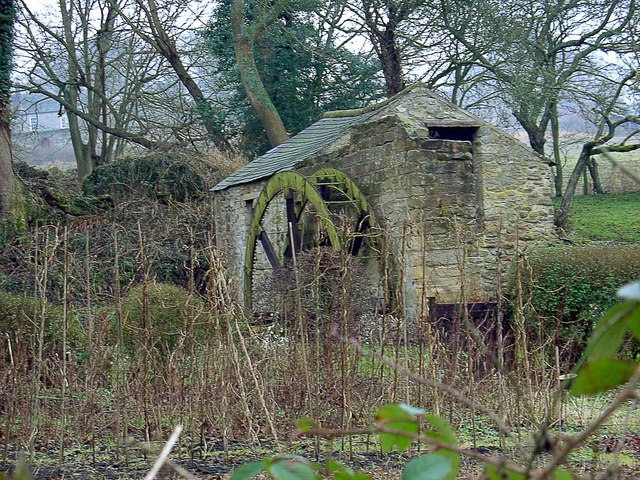
Ridley Mill, Northumberland

- Heatherslaw Mill, Etal
- Ridley Mill, Stocksfield
- Whittle Mill, Horsley

=== Nottinghamshire ===
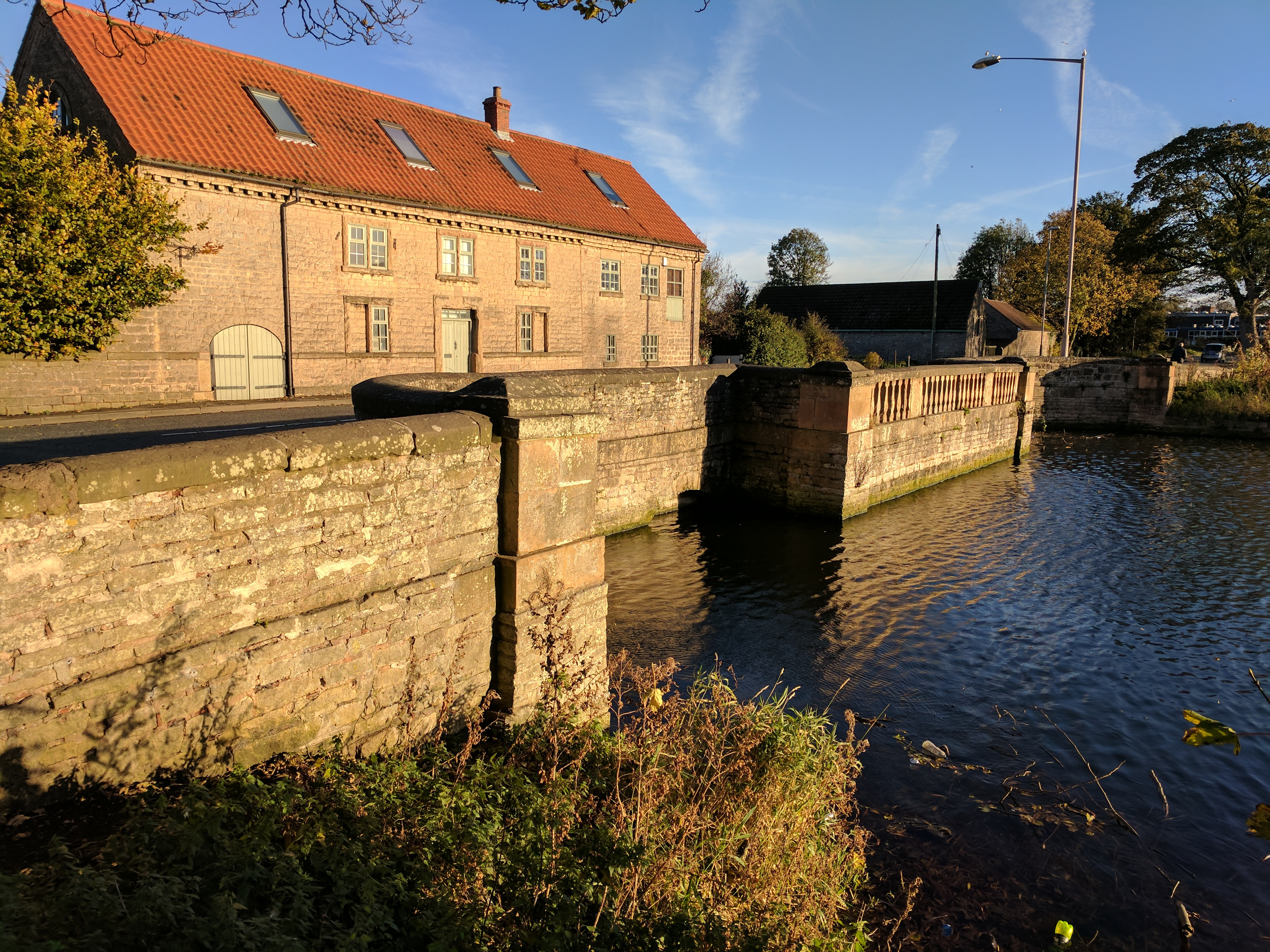
Warsop, Nottinghamshire

- Bath Mill, Mansfield
- Cuckney Mill, Cuckney
- Fiskerton Mill, Fiskerton
- Ollerton Mill, Ollerton
- Rufford Mill, Rufford
- Warsop Mill, Warsop

=== Oxfordshire ===
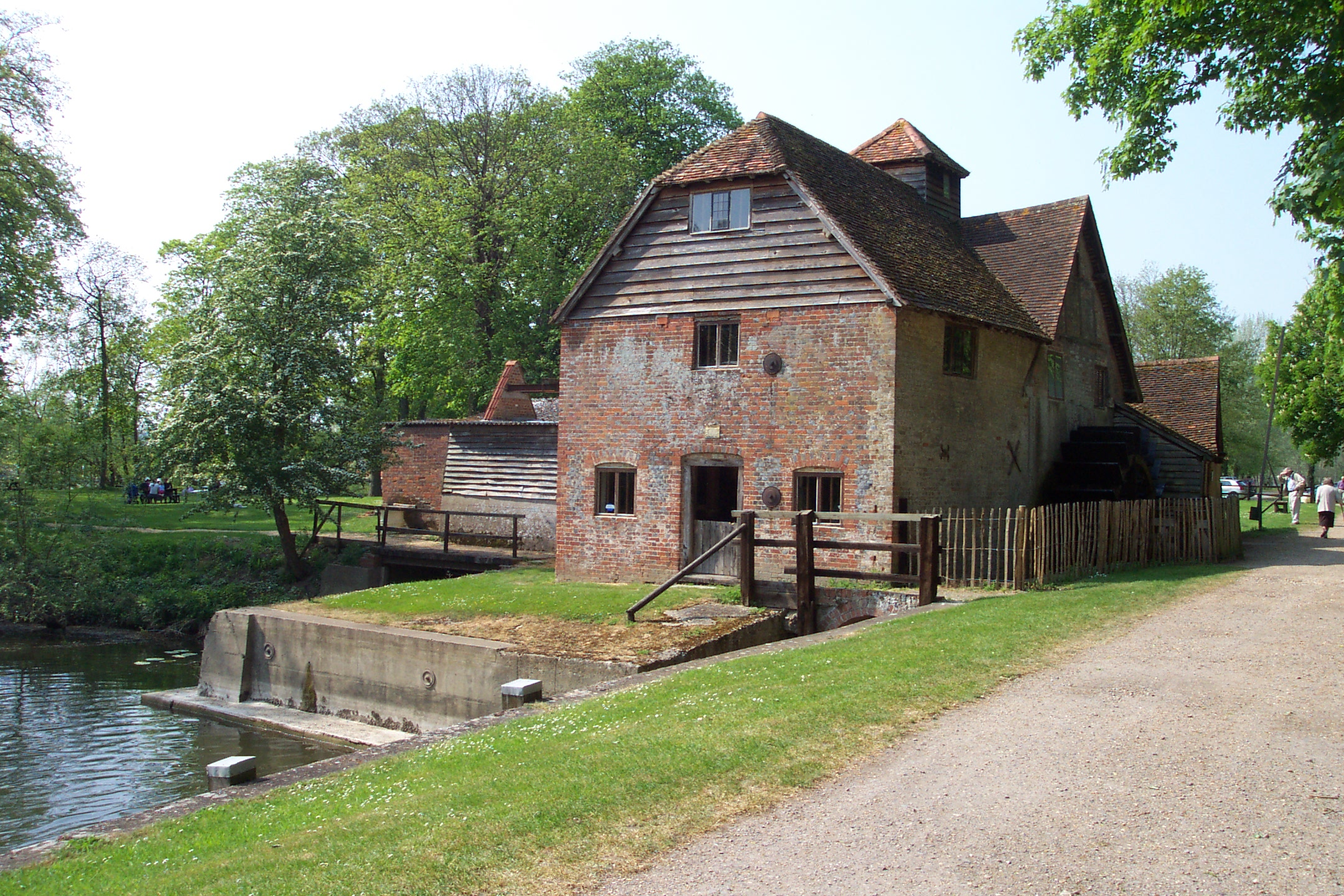
Mapledurham Watermill, Oxfordshire

- Ascott Mill, Ascott-under-Wychwood
- Bliss Tweed Mill, Chipping Norton
- Charney Mill, Charney Bassett
- Church Mill, Standlake
- Combe Mill, Long Hanborough
- Goring Mill, Goring-on-Thames
- Kings Mill, Oxford
- Little Clanfield Mill, Clanfield
- Lower Kingstone Mill, Ashbury
- Mapledurham Watermill, Mapledurham
- The Mill at Sonning, Sonning Eye
- Sandford Mill, Cothill
- Standhampton Mill, Stadhampton
- Venn Mill, Garford
- Wroxton Mill, Wroxton

=== Shropshire ===
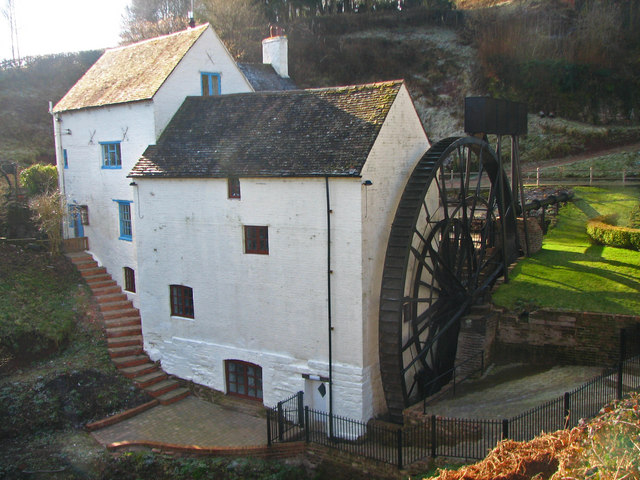
Daniel's Mill, Shropshire

- Borle Mill, Netherton, Highley
- Daniels Mill, Bridgnorth
- Upton Mill, Little Hereford, Shropshire.
- Wrickton Mill, Neenton

=== Somerset ===
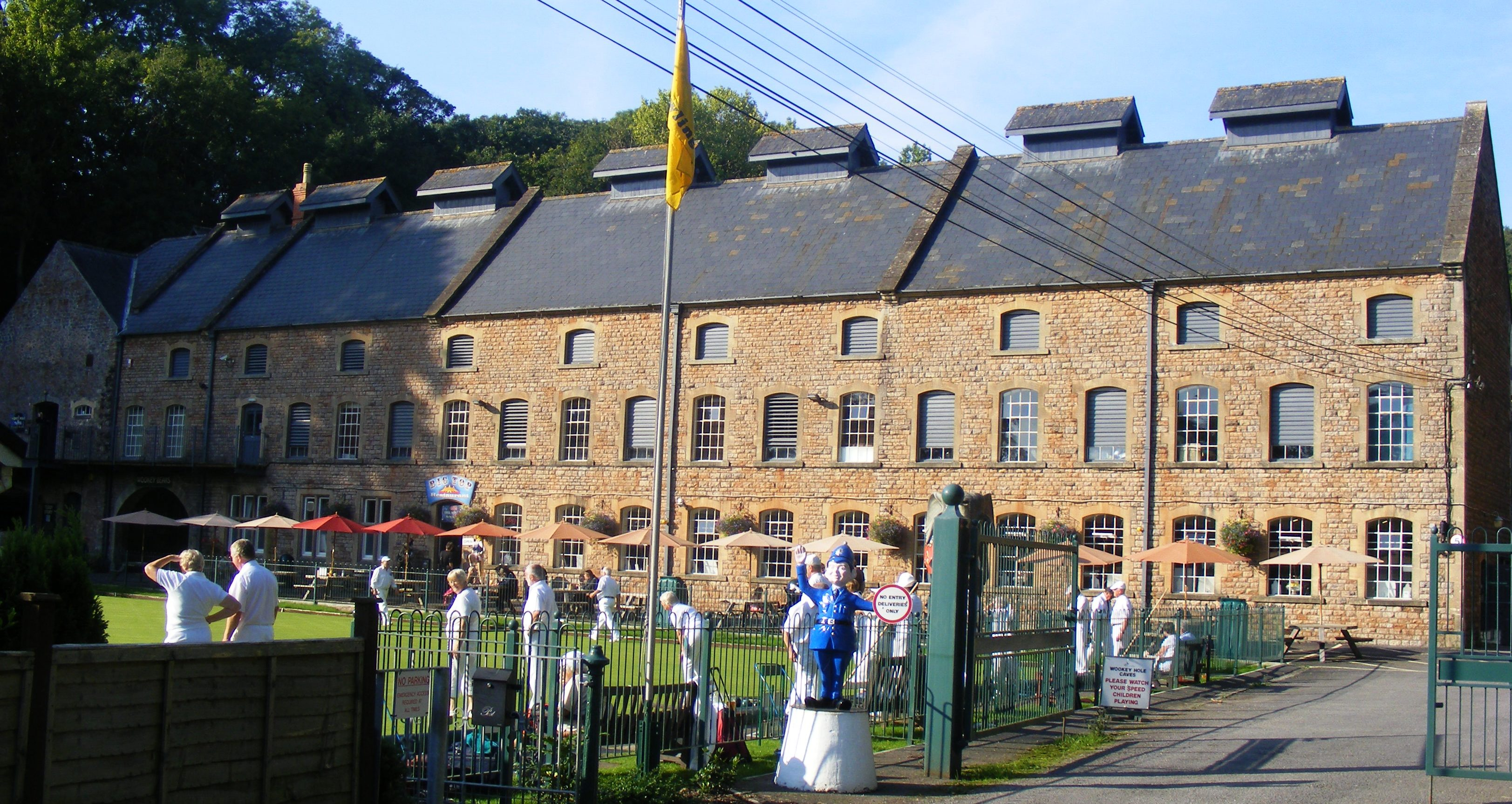
Wookey Hole Paper Mill, Somerset

- Bishop's Lydeard Mill, Bishops Lydeard
- Burcott Mill, Burcot
- Clapton Mill, Ston Easton
- Claverton Pumping Station, Claverton
- Combe House Hotel (originally a tannery) Holford
- Combe Sydenham Mill, Combe Sydenham
- Dunster Working Watermill, Dunster
- Gants Mill, Pitcombe
- Hestercombe Mill, West Monkton
- Higher Mill, Croscombe
- Hinton Farm Mill, Mudford
- Hornsbury Mill, Chard
- Orchard Mill, Williton
- Piles Mill, Allerford
- Priston Mill, Priston
- Rode Mill, Rode
- Saltford Brass Mill, Saltford
- Stratford Mill, Henbury
- Tonedale Mills, Wellington
- Williton Mill, Williton
- Wookey Hole Paper Mill, Wells

=== South Yorkshire ===
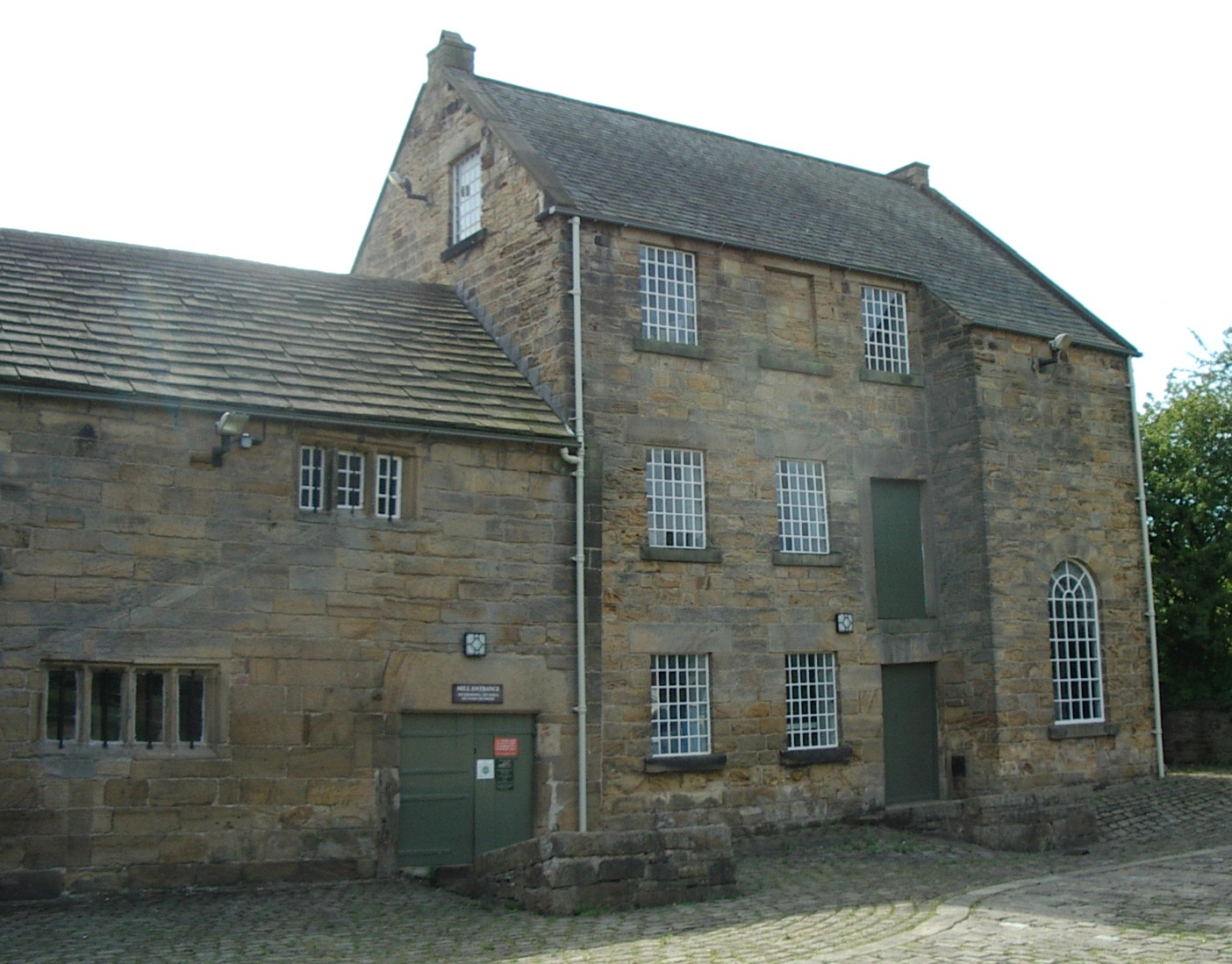
Worsbrough Mill, South Yorkshire

- Abbeydale Industrial Hamlet, Sheffield
- Bedgreave New Mill, Killamarsh
- Sharrow Mills, Sheffield
- Shepherd Wheel, Sheffield
- Top Forge, Thurgoland
- Worsbrough Mill, Barnsley
- Wortley Top Forge, Wortley

=== Staffordshire ===
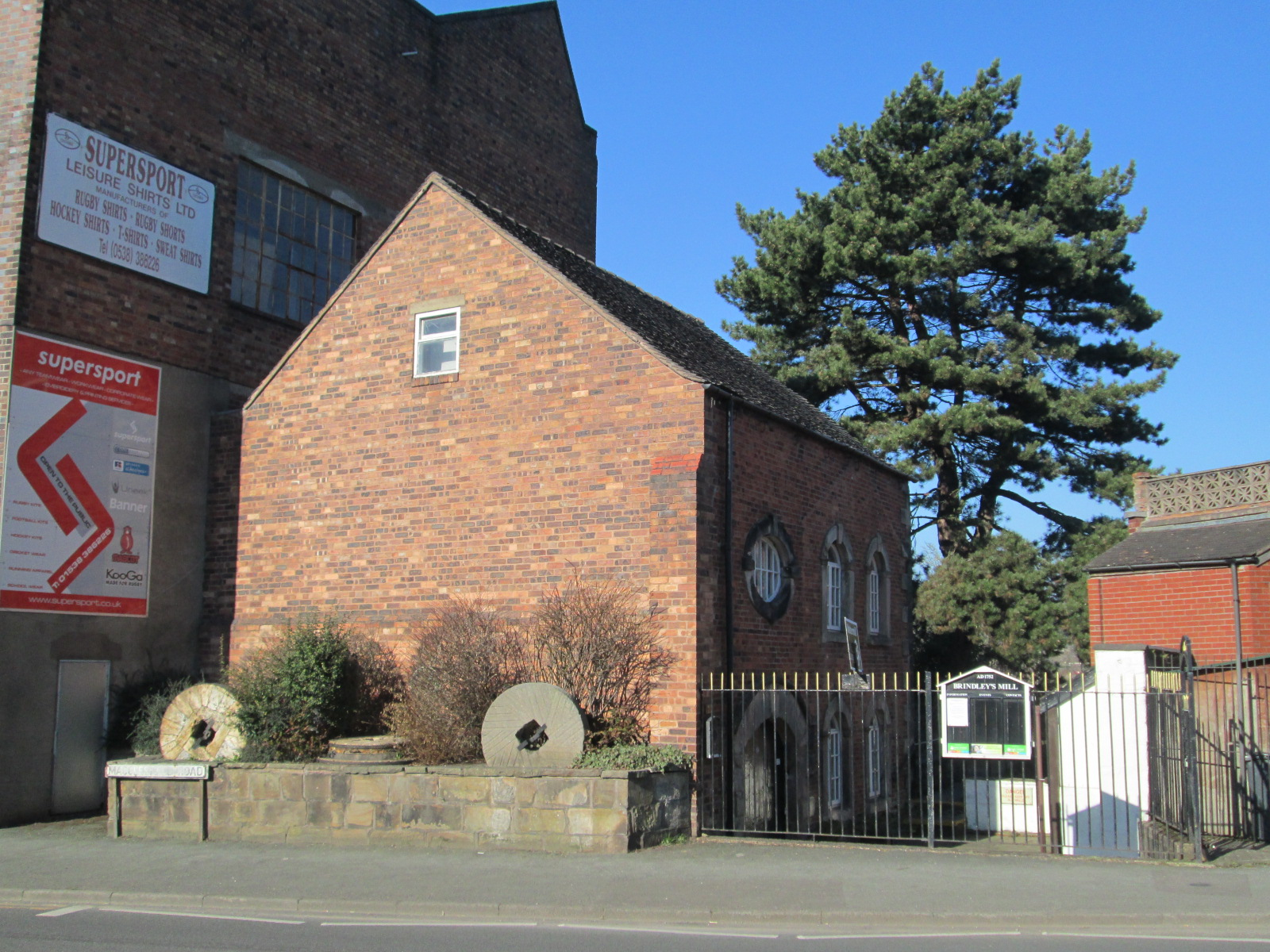
Brindley Mill, Staffordshire

- Boar Mill, Moddershall
- Brindley Water Mill, Leek
- Cheddleton Flint Mill, Cheddleton
- Coppice Mill, Stone
- Flint Mill, Stone
- Hayes Mill, Oulton
- Ivy Mill, Oulton
- Little Aston Mill, Little Aston
- Mosty Lea Mill, Moddershall
- Offley Mill, Staffordshire
- Shugborough Estate Mill, Shugborough Hall, Stafford
- Splashy Mill, Lower Moddershall
- Weaver's Mill, Stone
- Worston Mill, Great Bridgeford

=== Suffolk ===
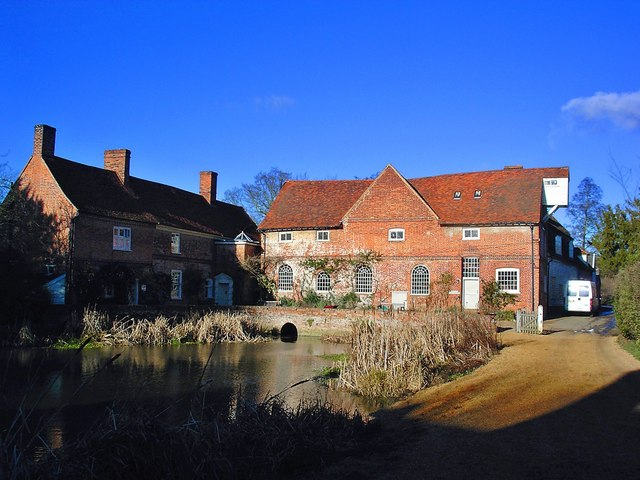
Flatford Mill, Suffolk

- Alton Mill, Stowmarket
- Bucklesham Mill, Bucklesham
- Euston Mill, Euston
- Flatford Mill, East Bergholt
- Letheringham Mill Letheringham
- Pakenham Watermill, Bury St Edmunds
- The Mill Hotel, Sudbury
- Shottisham watermill, Shottisham
- Wickham Mill, Wickham Market
- Woodbridge Tide Mill, Woodbridge

=== Surrey ===
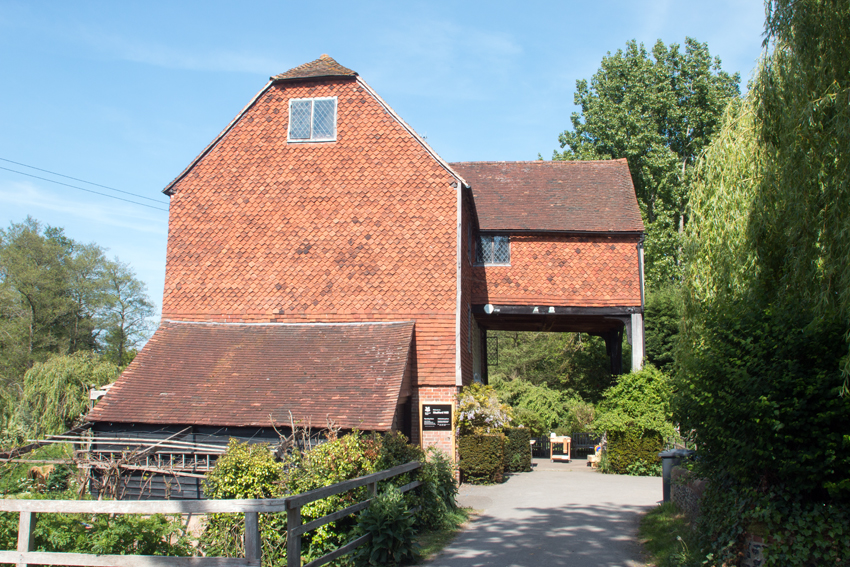
Shalford Mill, Surrey

- Abbey Mill, Eashing
- Albury Mill, Albury
- Botting's Mill, Postford
- Bourne Mill, Farnham
- Bourne Place Mill, Farnham
- Cobham Mill, Cobham
- Cosford Mill, Thursley
- Coxes Lock Mill, Addlestone
- Eashing Mill, Eashing
- Elstead Mill, Elstead
- Enton Mill, Witley
- Gresham Mill, Old Woking
- Gomshall Mill, Gomshall
- Hatch Mill, Farnham
- Hatch Mill, Godalming
- Haxted Watermill, near Edenbridge
- Heath Mill, Worplesdon
- High Mill, Farnham
- Netley Mill, Shere
- Ockford Mill, Godalming
- Ockham Mill, Ockham
- Old Castle Mill, Pixham
- Paddington Mill, Abinger
- Pirbright Mill, Pirbright
- Pippbrook Mill, Dorking
- Pixham Mill, Dorking
- Rickford's Mill, Worplesdon
- Shalford Mill, Guildford
- Sickle Mill, Haslemere
- Snowdenham Mill, Bramley
- Stanford Mill, Haslemere
- Stoke Mill, Guildford
- Town Mill, Guildford
- Unwin's Mill, Old Woking
- Upper Mill, Ewell
- Willey Mill, Farnham
- Wonersh Mill, Wonersh

=== Tyne and Wear ===
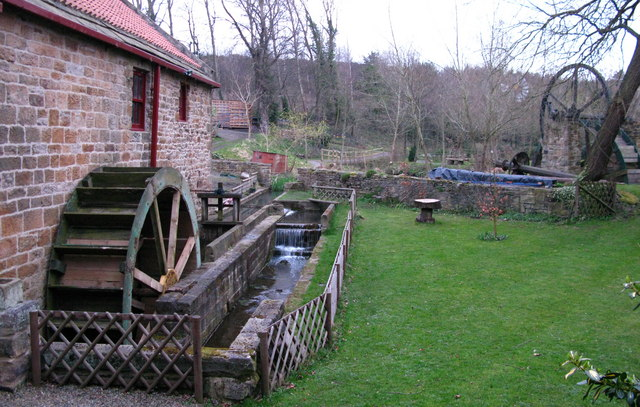
Path Head Water Mill, Tyne and Wear

- Jesmond Dene Mill, Jesmond
- Path Head Watermill, Blaydon

=== Warwickshire ===
Wellesbourne Water Mill, Warwickshire

- Arrow Mill, Alcester
- Charlecote Mill, Stratford-upon-Avon
- Saxon Mill, Warwick
- Wellesbourne Watermill, Wellesbourne

=== West Midlands ===
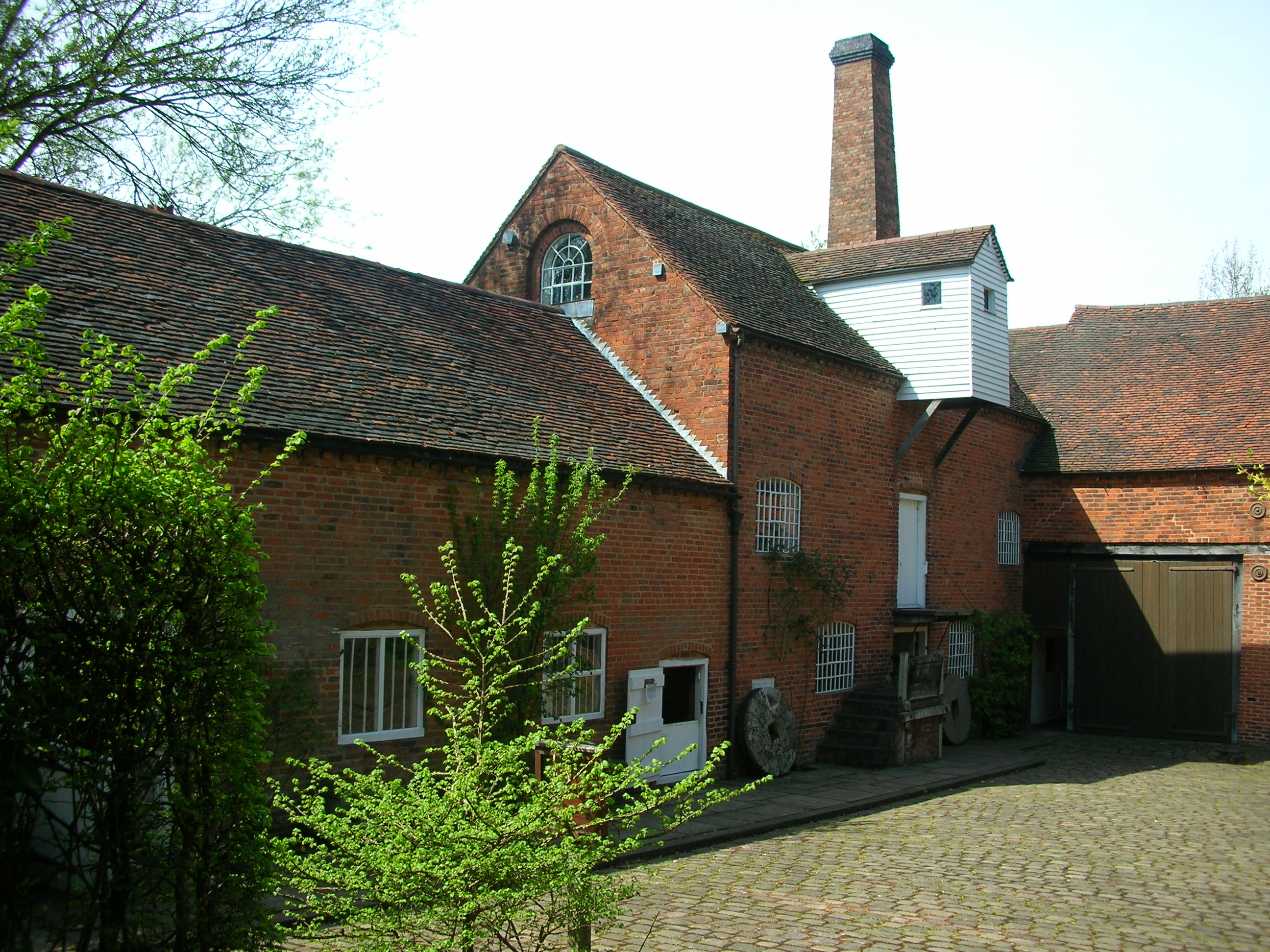
Sarehole Mill, West Midlands

- New Hall Mill, Sutton Coldfield
- Sarehole Mill, Hall Green, Birmingham

=== West Sussex ===
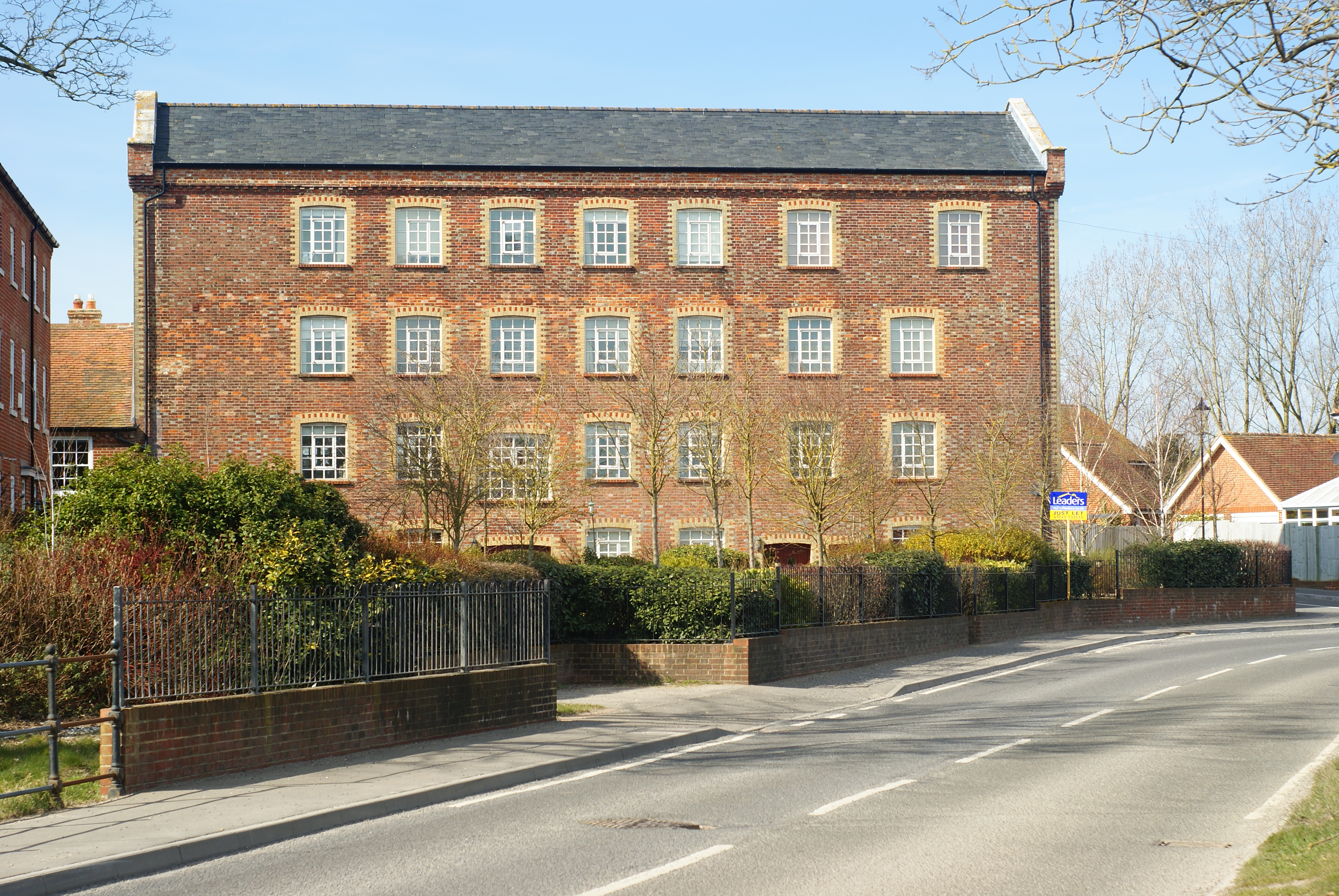
Westhampnett Mill, West Sussex

- Burton Mill, Petworth
- Coultershaw Beam Pump, Petworth
- Horsted Keynes Mill, Horsted Keynes
- Ifield Water Mill, Crawley
- Lurgashall Watermill, Singleton
- Provender Mill Horsham
- Westhampnett Mill
- Woods Mill, Henfield

=== West Yorkshire ===
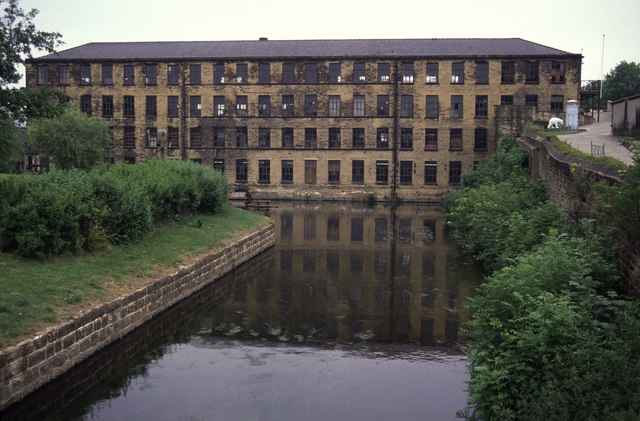
Armley Mills, Leeds, West Yorkshire

- Armley Mills, Armley
- Moorside Mills, Eccleshill
- Scarcroft Watermill, Scarcroft
- Thwaite Mills, Leeds
- Queen's Mill, Castleford

=== Wiltshire ===
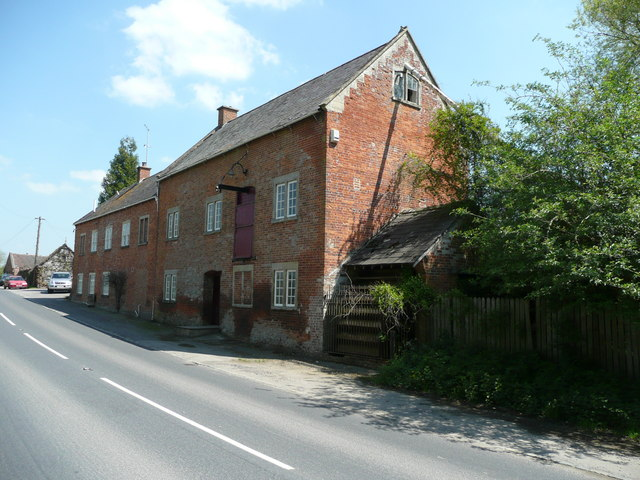
Blackland Mill, Wiltshire

- Blackland Mill, Blackland (near Calne)
- Coleshill Mill, Swindon
- White's Mill, West Lavington
- Broad Town Mill, Broad Town

=== Worcestershire ===
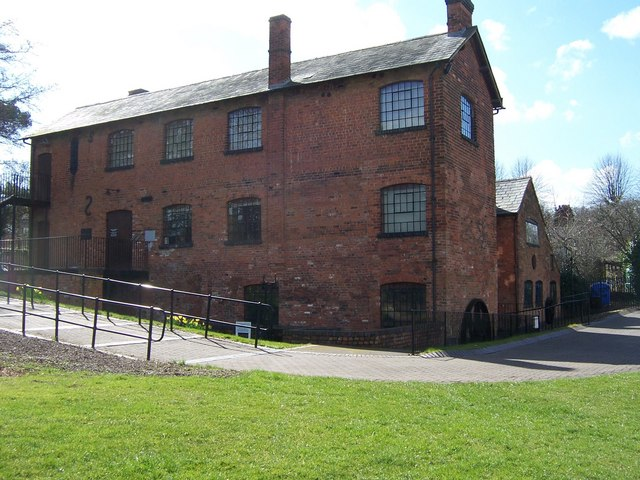
Forge Mill, Worcestershire

- Churchill Forge Mill, Churchill
- Cropthorne Mill, Cropthorne
- Forge Mill, Redditch
- Knowles Mill, Bewdley
- Mortimers Cross Mill, Lucton
- Newnham Mill, Newnham Bridge

== Scotland ==
=== Aberdeenshire ===
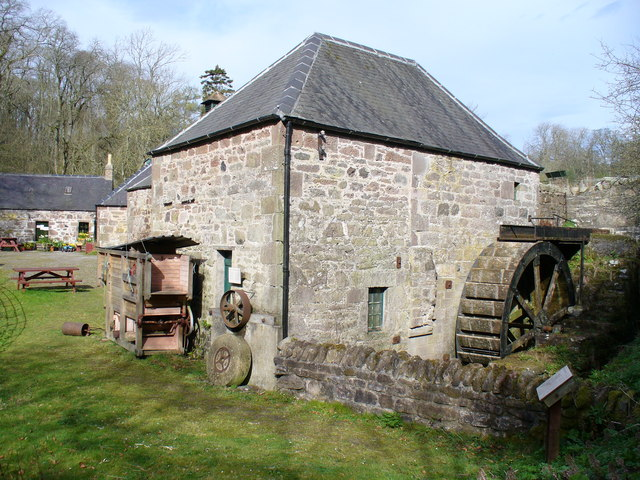
Mill of Benholm, Aberdeenshire

- Benholm Mill, Johnshaven
- Bucket Mill, Finzean
- Mill of Mindoro, Bridge of Don
- Mill of Towie, Drummuir

=== Angus ===
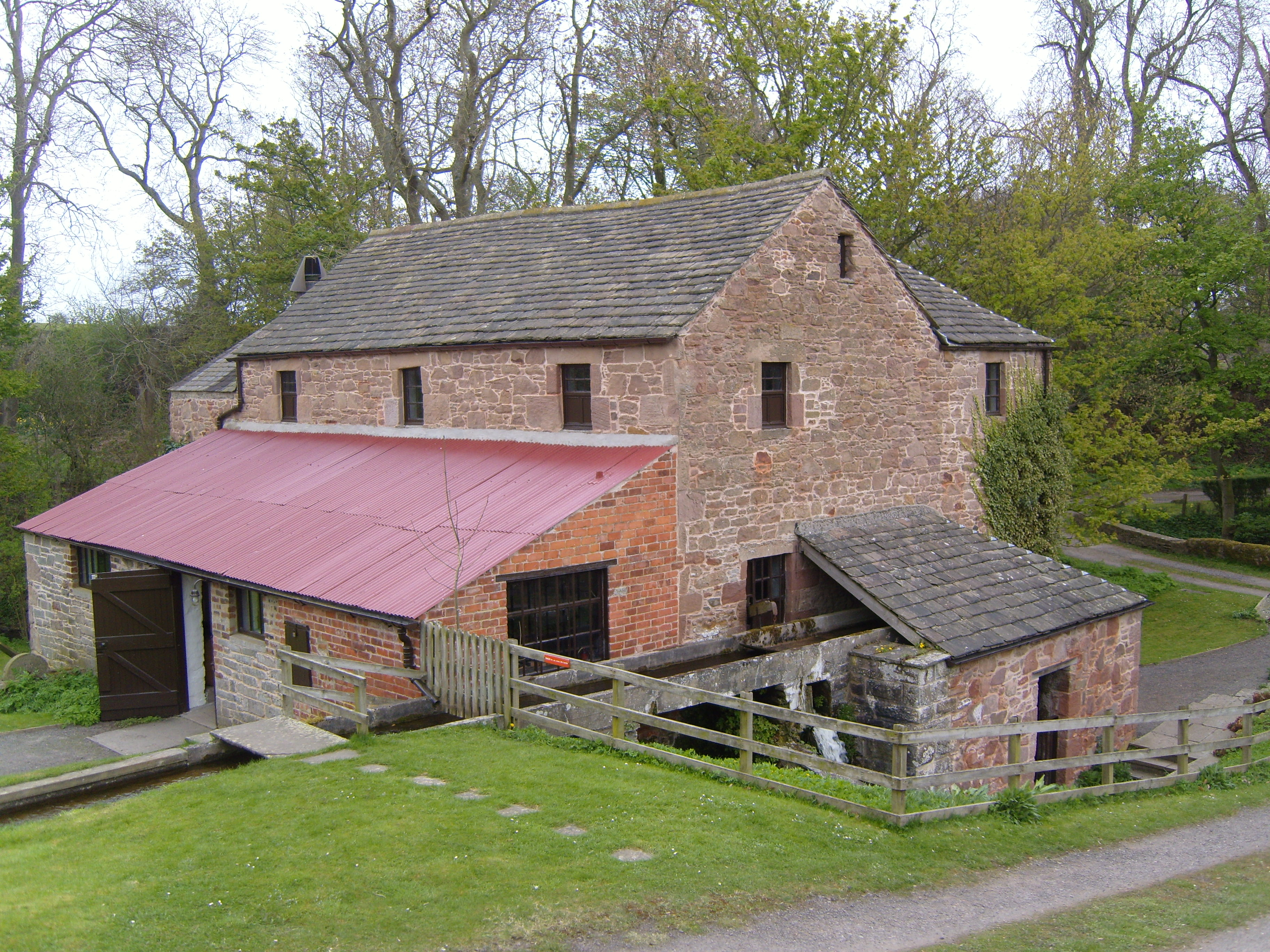
Barry Mill, Angus

- Aberfeldy Watermill, Aberfeldy
- Barry Mill, Carnoustie

=== Dumfries and Galloway ===
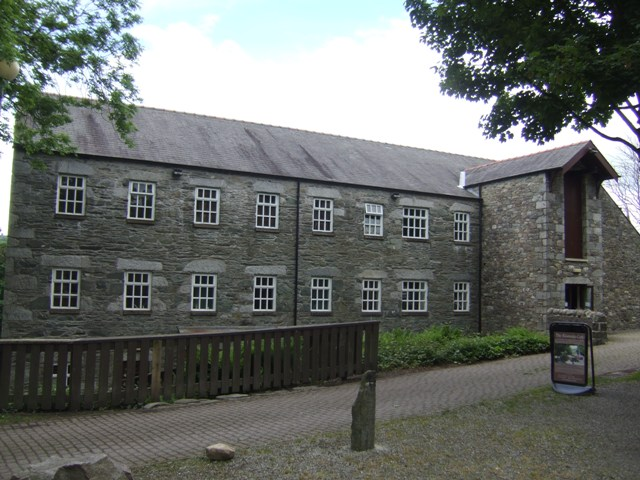
Bobbin Mill on the Fleet, Dumfries and Galloway

- Barburgh Mill, Closeburn
- Enterkinfoot Mill, Enterkinfoot
- Mennock Mill, Mennock
- Mill on the Fleet, Gatehouse of Fleet
- New Abbey Mill, New Abbey

=== East Ayrshire ===
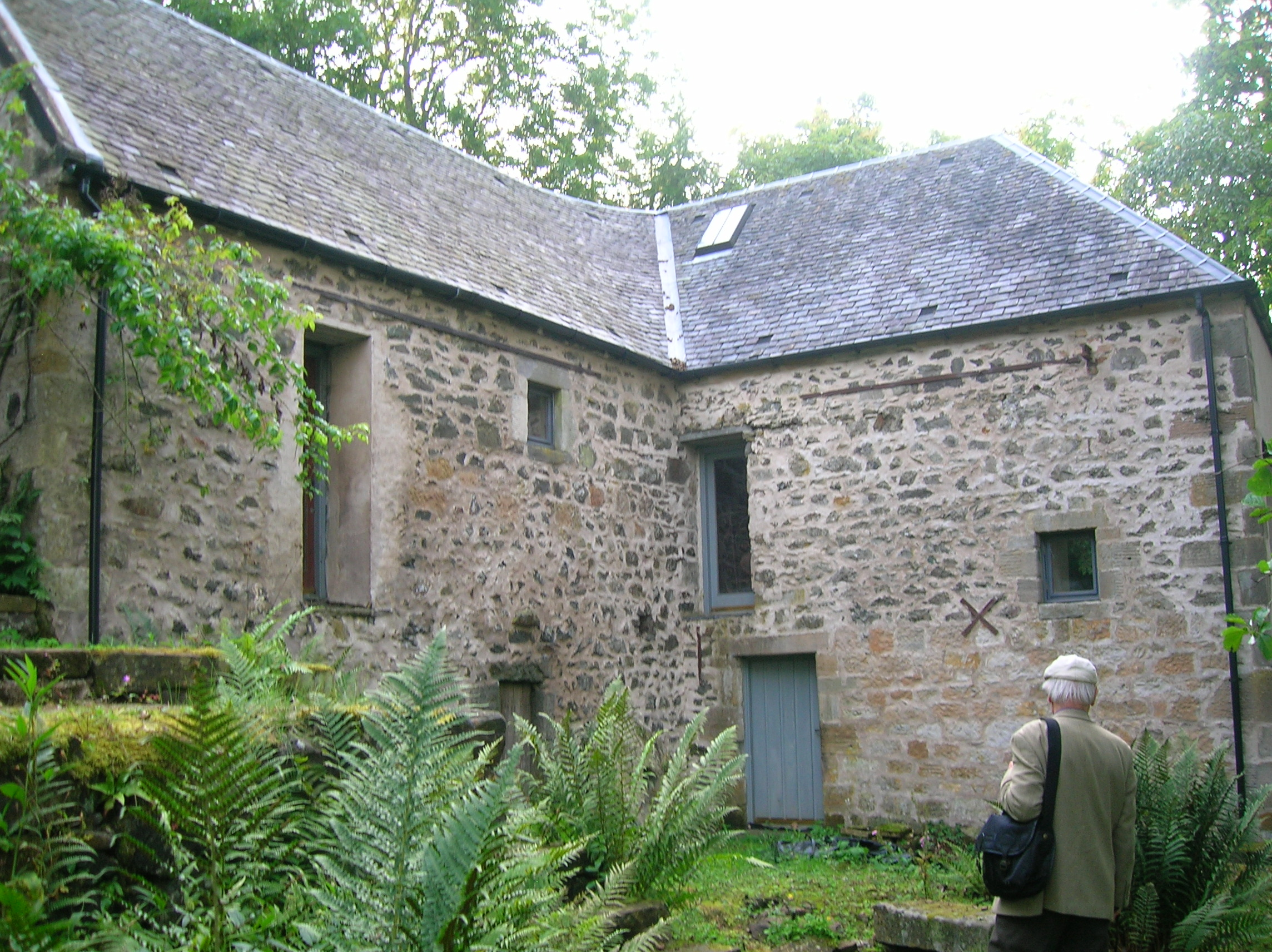
Aiket Mill, East Ayrshire

- Aiket Mill, Dunlop
- Bloak Mill, Dunlop
- Busbie Mill, Knockentiber
- Dalmore Mill, Stair
- Dalmusternock Mill
- Drumastle Mill, Dalry
- Giffen Mill, Barrmill
- Kilmaurs Mill, Kilmaurs
- Ladeside Mill, Mauchline
- Laigh Milton Mill, Gatehead
- Lainshaw Mill, Stewarton
- Lambroch Mill, Stewarton
- Old or Commoncraigs Mill, Dunlop

=== East Lothian ===
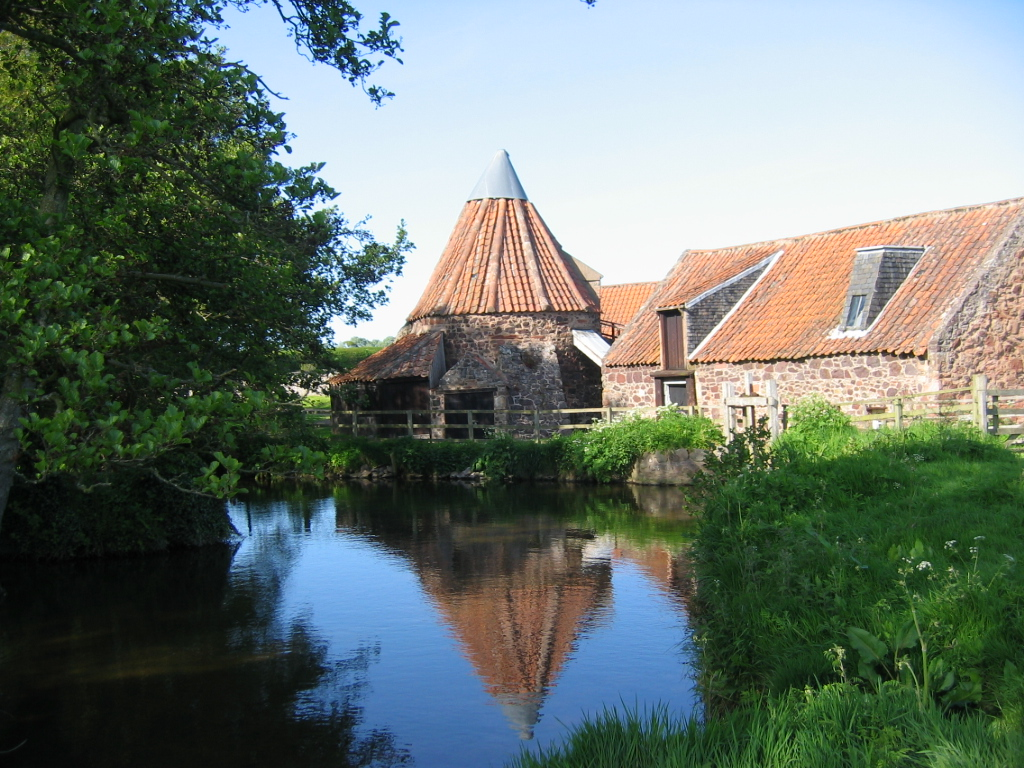
Preston Mill, East Lothian

- Knowes Mill, East Linton
- Preston Mill, East Linton

=== East Renfrewshire ===
- Dripps Mill, Waterfoot
- Knowes Mill

=== Highlands ===
- Click Mill, Kingussie
- John O'Groats Mill, Caithness

=== Lanarkshire ===
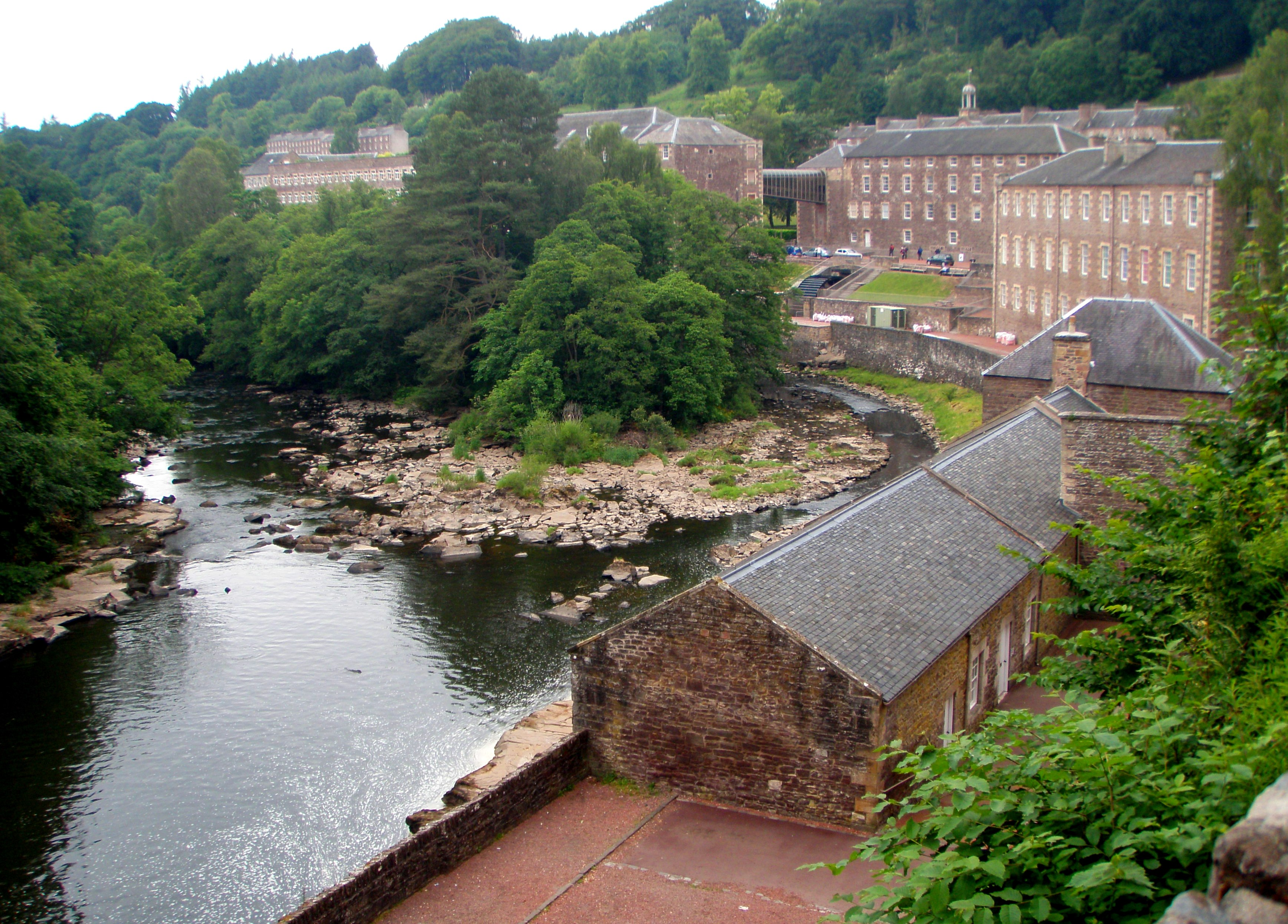
New Lanark mill buildings

- Carmichael Mill, Hyndford Bridge
- New Lanark Mill, New Lanark

=== Moray ===
- Old Mills, Elgin

=== North Ayrshire ===
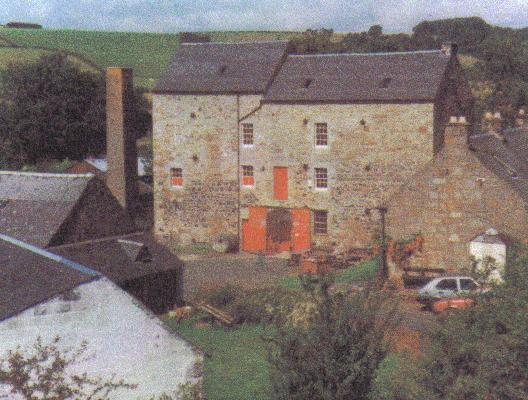
Dalgarven Mill, North Ayrshire

- Bark Mill, Beith
- Broadstone Mill, Barrmill
- Cavan Mill, Auchentiber
- Coldstream Mill, Beith
- Craigmill, Dalry
- Cranshaw Mill, Kilmaurs
- Crevoch Mill, Dunlop
- Cunninghamhead Mill, Cunninghamhead
- Dalgarven Mill, Kilwinning
- Drumastle Mill, Dalry
- Drumbuie Mill, Barrmill
- East Kersland Mill, Dalry
- Giffen Mill, Barrmill
- Giffordland Mill, Dalry
- Kersland Mill, Beith
- Mill o'Beith, Beith
- Nethermill, Kilbirnie
- Perceton Mill, Irvine
- Sevenacres Mill, Kilwinning
- Stevenston Corn Mill

=== Orkney ===
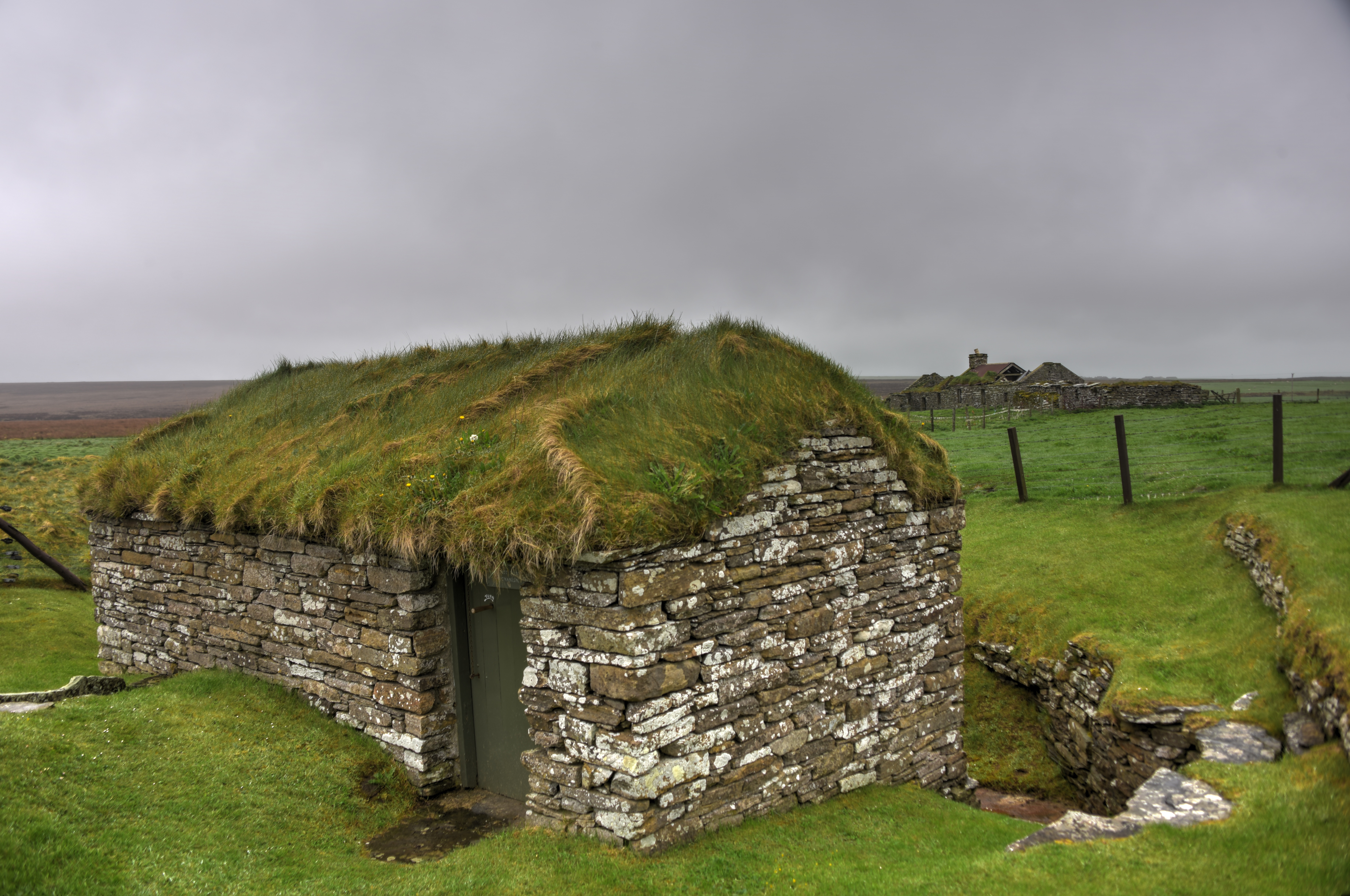
Dounby Click Mill, Orkney

- Ayre Mill, Kirkwall
- Barony Mill, Birsay
- Boloquoy Mill, Sanday
- Cairston Mill, Stromness
- Dounby Click Mill, Dounby
- East Denwick Mill, Deerness
- Elwick Mill, Shapinsay
- Eyrland Mill, Stenness
- Firth Mill, Firth
- Grimness Mill, South Ronaldsay
- Kirbuster Mill, Orphir
- Peckhole Mill, North Ronaldsay
- Rango Mill, Sandwick
- Red House Mill, Eday
- Russland Mill, Harray
- Tankerness Mill, Tankerness
- Tormiston Mill, Stenness
- Trenabie Mill, Westray
- Sebay Mill, Toab
- Sourin Mill, Rousay
- Woodwick Mill, Evie

=== Perthshire ===
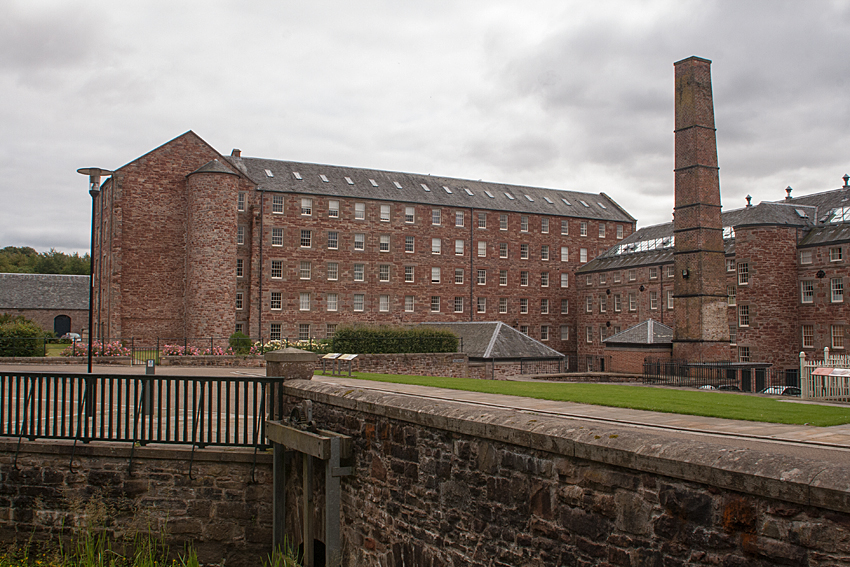
Stanley Mills, Perthshire

- Blair Atholl Watermill, Pitlochry
- Deanston Mill, Deanston
- Keithbank Mill, Blairgowrie
- Lower City Mill, Perth
- Stanley Mill, Stanley

=== Renfrewshire ===
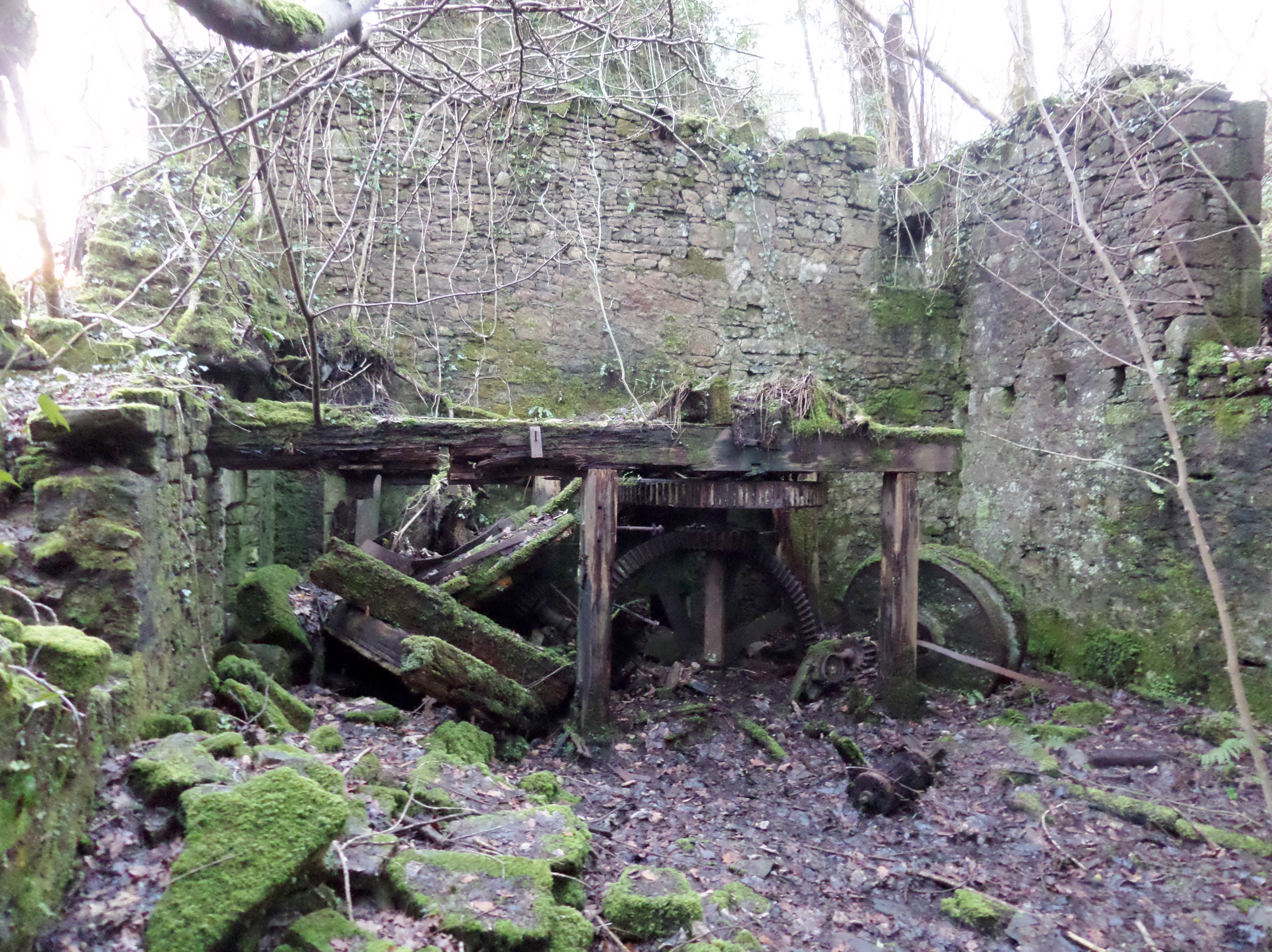
Meikle Millbank Mill, Renfrewshire

- Meikle Millbank Mill, Lochwinnoch

=== Scottish Borders ===
- Robert Small's Printing Works, Innerleithen

=== Shetland ===
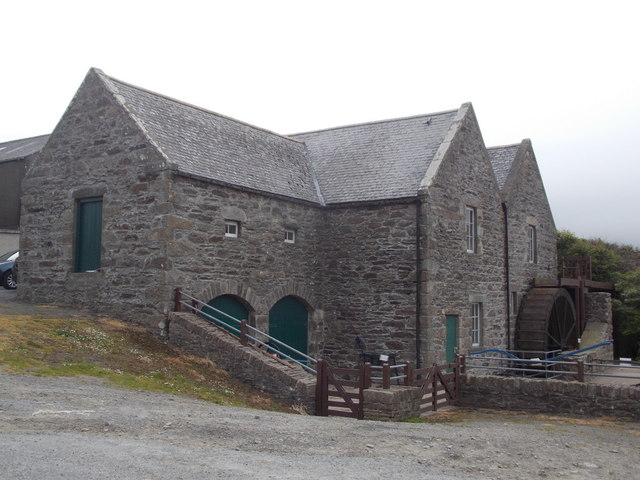
Quendale mill, Shetland

- Crofthouse Museum, Dunrossness
- Huxter Mills, Sandness
- Quendale Water Mill, South Mainland

=== South Ayrshire ===
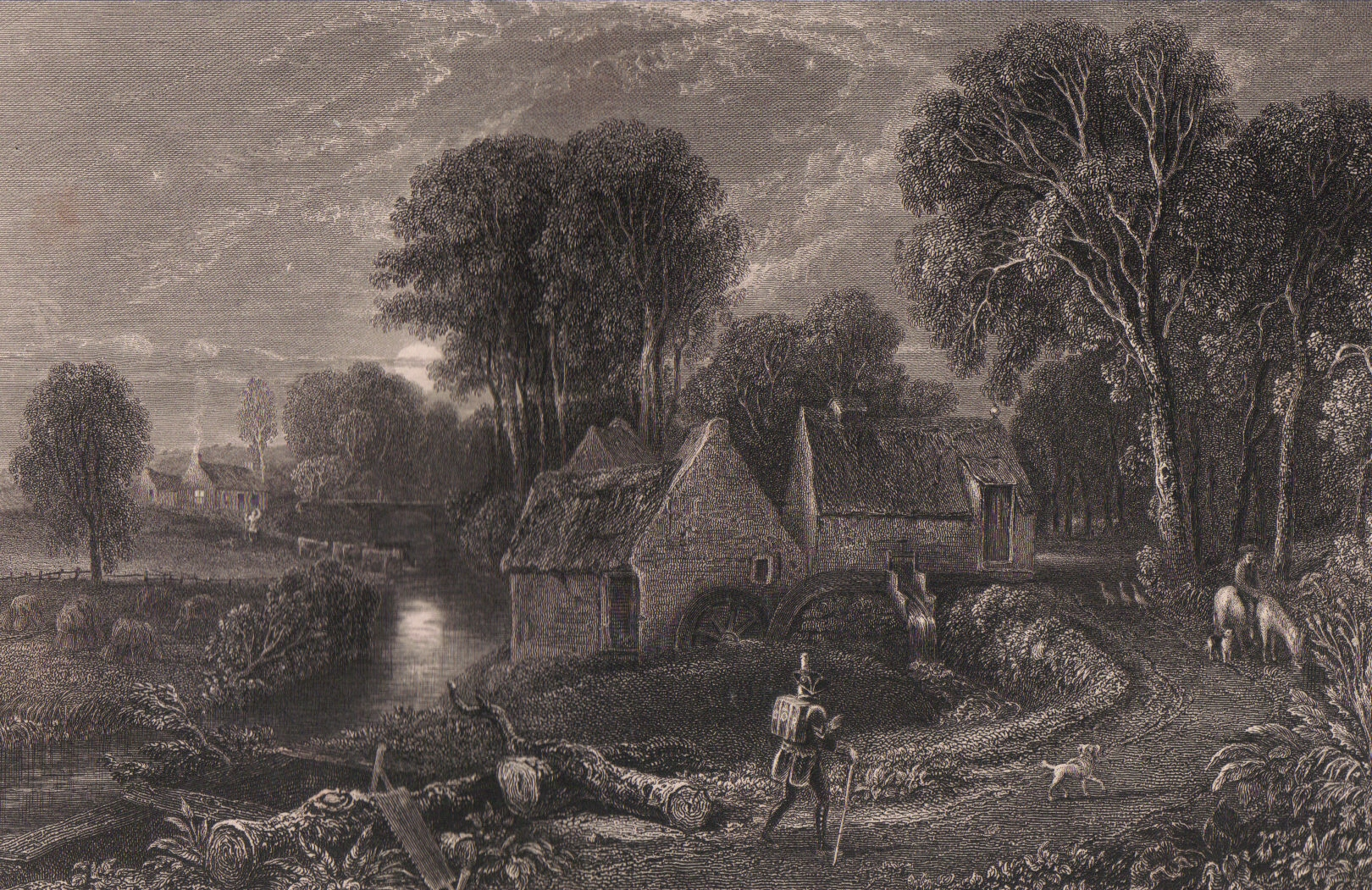
Millmannoch Mill in the 18th century, South Ayrshire

- Dutch Mill, Alloway
- Mill of Fail, Tarbolton
- Millburn Mill, Tarbolton
- Millmannoch, Drongan

=== Western Isles ===
- Siabost Mill, Shawbost
- Garrabost Mill, Garrabost

=== West Lothian ===
- Livingston Mill, Livingston

== Northern Ireland ==
=== County Antrim ===
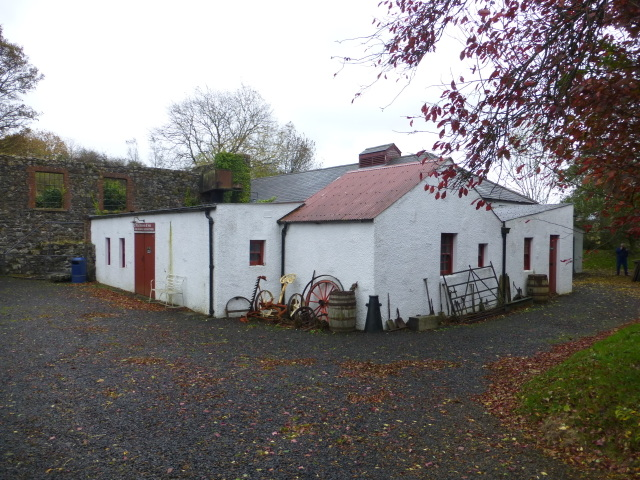
Pattersons Spade Mill, County Antrim

- Orr's Mill, Milltown
- Patterson's Spade Mill, Templepatrick
- Whiggleton Mill, Kells

=== County Down ===
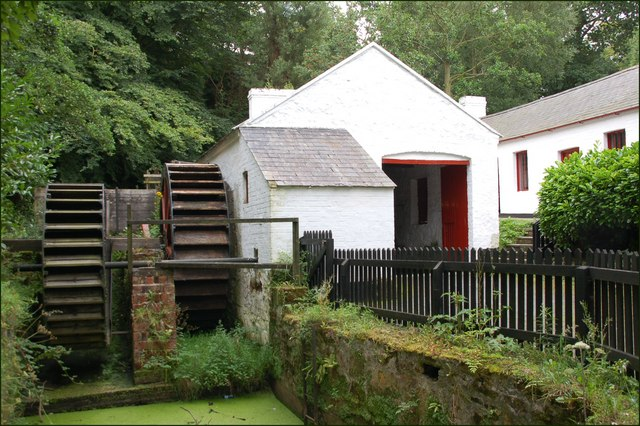
Coalisland Mill, County Down

- Annalong Mill, Annalong
- Castle Ward Mills, Strangford
- Coal Island Spade Mill, Ulster Folk and Transport Museum
- Dundonald Old Mill, Dundonald
- Gorticashel Flax Mill, Ulster Folk and Transport Museum
- Straid Mill, Ulster Folk and Transport Museum
- Marybrook Mills, Listooder

=== County Fermanagh ===
- Florence Court Sawmill, Enniskillen

=== County Tyrone ===
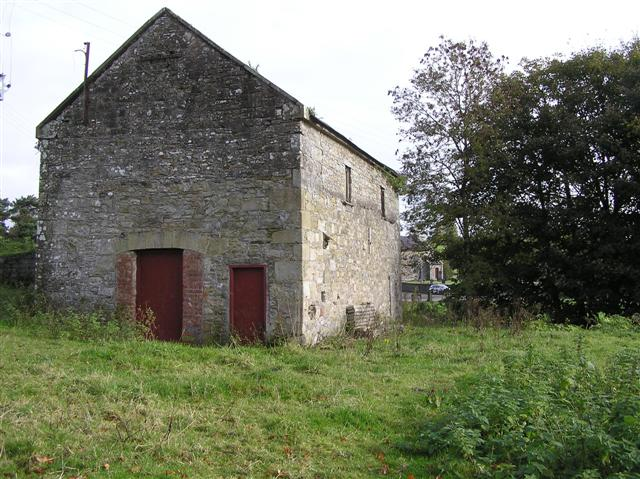
Ballynasaggart, County Tyrone

- Ballynasaggart Mill, Ballygawley
- Ennish Mill, Dungannon
- Wellbrook Beetling Mill, Cookstown

== Wales ==
=== Clwyd ===
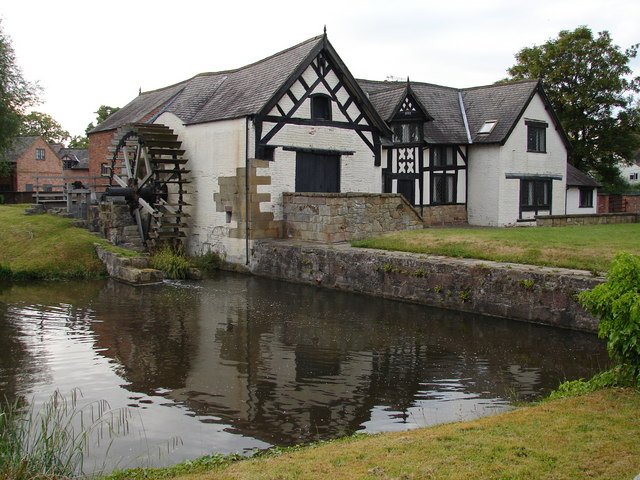
Rossett Mill, Clwyd

- Bersham Ironworks, Bersham
- Corn Mill, Llangollen
- Felin Isaf, Glan Conwy
- Gresford Mill, Gresford
- King's Mill, Wrexham
- Marford Mill, Rossett
- Minera Lead Mine, Coedpoeth
- Nant Mill, Coedpoeth
- Penmachno Woollen Mill, Penmachno
- Pentrifoelas Mill, Pentrefoelas
- Rossett Mill, Rossett
- Trefriw Woollen Mill, Trefriw

=== Dyfed ===
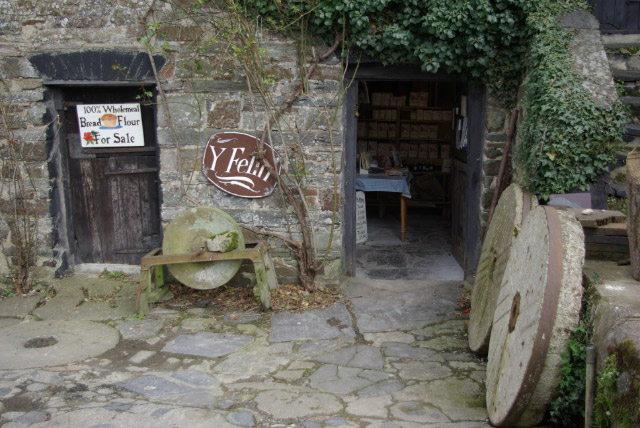
Y Felin, St Dogmaels, Dyfed

- Blackpool Mill, Martletwy
- Cambrian Mill, Dre-fach Felindre
- Carew Tidal Mill, Carew
- Cenarth Mill, Cenarth
- Denant Mill, Dreenhill
- Dre-fach Felindre
- Dyfi Furnace, Furnace
- Felin Ganol, Llanrhystud
- Felin Geri, Cwm Cou
- Felin Hesgwm, Dinas Cross
- Felin Newydd, Crugybar
- Felin yr Aber Llanwnnen
- Llywernog Mine, Llywernog
- Middle Mill, Solva
- Nant y Coy Mill, Wolf's Castle
- Rock Mill, Llandysul
- Tide Mill, Carew
- Tide Mill, Pembroke
- Tregwynt Woollen Mill, Castlemorris
- Y Felin, St. Dogmaels

=== Gwent ===
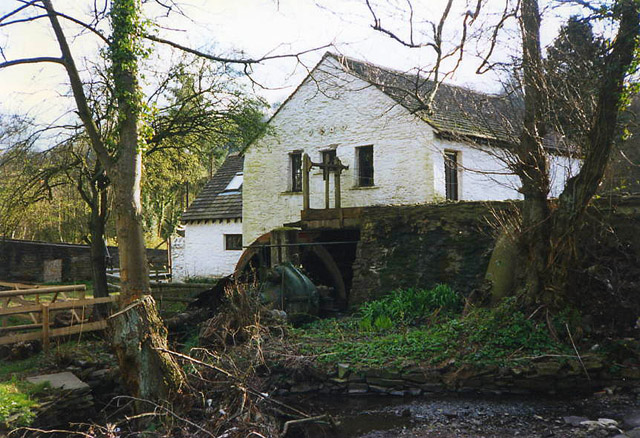
Gelligroes Mill, Gwent

- Gelligroes Mill, Pontllanfraith
- Monnow Mill, Osbaston

=== Gwynedd ===
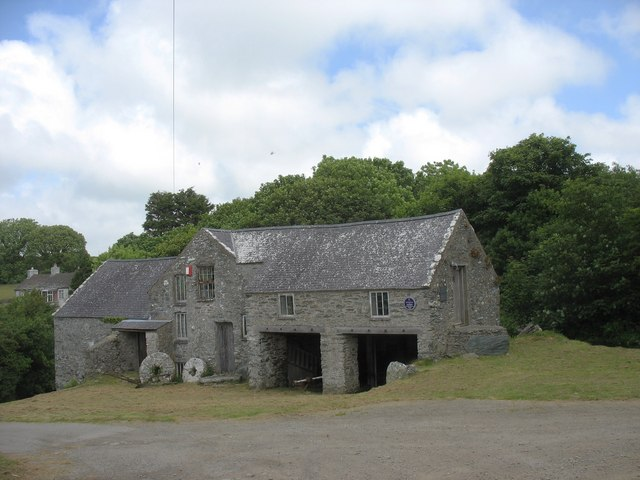
Melin Hywel, Gwynedd

- Brynkyr Woollen Mill, Garndolbenmaen
- Cochwillan Mill, Talybont
- Felin Faesog, Clynnog Fawr
- Melin Hywel, Llanddeusant
- National Slate Museum, Llanberis
- Pant-yr-Ynn Mill, Blaenau Ffestiniog

=== Mid Glamorgan ===
- Melin Pontrhydycyff, Llangynwyd
- Pentre Mill, Pentre

=== Powys ===
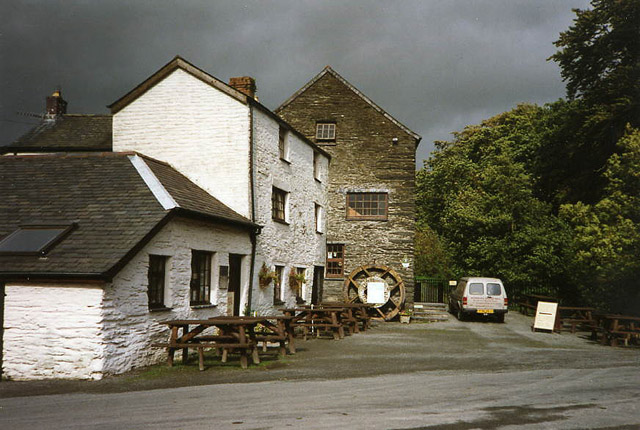
Penegoes Water Mill, Powys

- Bacheldre Mill, Montgomery
- Felin Crewi, Penegoes
- Talgarth Mill, Talgarth

=== South Glamorgan ===
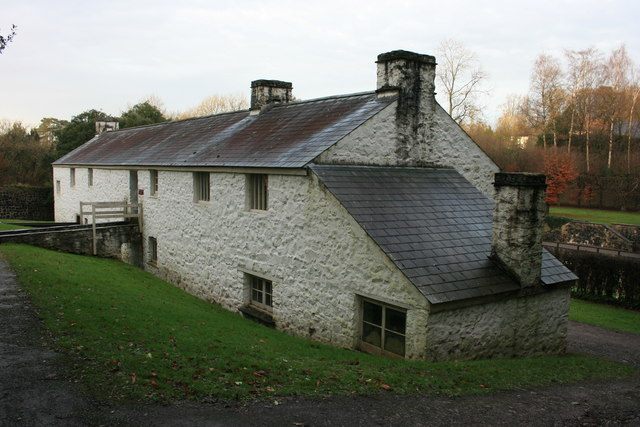
Esgair Moel, South Glamorgan

- Deheufryn Gorse Mill, St Fagans
- Esgair Moel, St Fagans
- Melin Bompren, St Fagans
- Rhayader Tannery, St Fagans
- Tŷ'n Rhos Sawmill, St Fagans

=== West Glamorgan ===
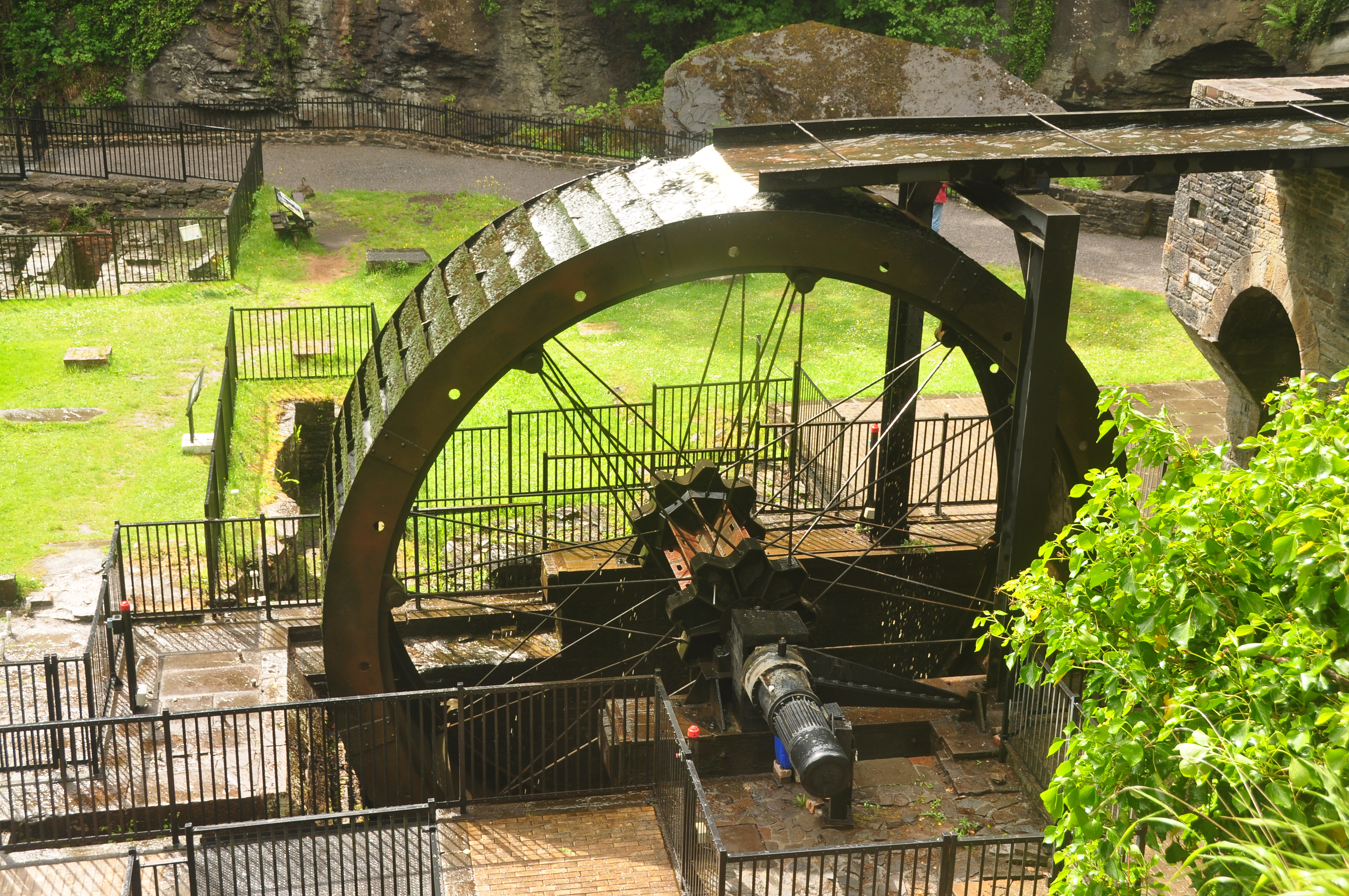
Aberdulais Tin Works, West Glamorgan

- Abbey Woolen Mill, Swansea
- Aberdulais Falls, Aberdulais
- Y Felin Dolwys, Parkmill

== See also ==
- Mills on the River Wey and its tributaries
- List of windmills in the United Kingdom
- List of watermills in the Crown Dependencies
- Windmill
- Windpump
- Tide Mill
- Medway watermills
  - Medway watermills (lower tributaries)
  - Medway watermills (middle tributaries)
  - Medway watermills (upper tributaries)
- Stour watermills
