= Listed parks and gardens in Greater London =

The Register of Historic Parks and Gardens of Special Historic Interest in England, created in 1983, is administered by Historic England. It includes more than 1,600 sites, ranging from gardens of private houses, to cemeteries and public parks.

There are 168 registered parks and gardens in Greater London. 18 are listed at grade I, the highest grade, 32 at grade II*, the middle grade, and 118 at grade II, the lowest grade.

There are no listed parks and gardens in the London Borough of Barking and Dagenham, the Royal Borough of Kingston upon Thames or the London Borough of Waltham Forest.

== Key ==
Grade	Criteria
I	Parks and gardens of exceptional interest, sometimes considered to be internationally important
II*	Particularly important parks and gardens of more than special interest
II	Parks and gardens of national importance and special interest

== Parks and gardens ==
=== Barnet ===
Name	Grade	Location	Type	Completed (Note: The date given is the date used by Historic England as significant for the initial building or that of an important part in the structure's description.)	Grid ref. (Note: The grid reference is based on the British national grid reference system, sometimes known as OSGB36, used by the Ordnance Survey.) Geo-coordinates	Entry number (Note: The "List Entry Number" is a unique number assigned to each listed building and scheduled monument by Historic England.)	Image
Avenue House Grounds	II	Church End	Public park	1880s	TQ 25212 90274	1001430	Avenue House Grounds
East Finchley Cemetery	II*	East Finchley	Cemetery	1855	TQ 25913 89605	1000835	East Finchley Cemetery
Golders Green Crematorium	I	Golders Green	Crematorium	1902	TQ 25360 87961	1001575	Golders Green Crematorium
Golders Green Jewish Cemetery	II	Golders Green	Cemetery	1896	TQ2521788071	1465310	Golders Green Jewish Cemetery
St Pancras and Islington Cemetery	II*	East Finchley	Cemetery	1854	TQ 27218 90615	1001688	St Pancras and Islington Cemetery
Wrotham Park	II	Hadley	Landscape park	Early 19th century	TQ2448998979	1000254	Wrotham Park

=== Bexley ===
Name	Grade	Location	Type	Completed	Grid ref. Geo-coordinates	Entry number	Image
Danson Park	II	Welling	Public park	1760s	TQ4710575029	1000211	Danson Park
Foots Cray Place	II	Foots Cray	Park and garden	1903	TQ4740971818	1000288	Foots Cray Place
Hall Place	II	Bexley	Garden	1920s	TQ 50240 74176	1000247	Hall Place
Lamorbey Park	II	Sidcup	Park and gardens	Early 20th century	TQ4669873240	1000289	Lamorbey Park

=== Brent ===
Name	Grade	Location	Type	Completed	Grid ref. Geo-coordinates	Entry number	Image
Paddington Cemetery	II	Kilburn	Cemetery	1855	TQ 24562 83752	1001542	Paddington Cemetery
Roundwood Park	II	Willesden	Public park	1895	TQ 22142 84043	1001556	Roundwood Park
Willesden Jewish Cemetery	II	Willesden	Cemetery	1873	TQ2210484425	1449184	Willesden Jewish Cemetery

=== Bromley ===
Name	Grade	Location	Type	Completed	Grid ref. Geo-coordinates	Entry number	Image
Crystal Palace Park	II*	Crystal Palace	Public park	1855	TQ 34298 70925	1000373	Crystal Palace Park
Down House	II	Downe	Garden	1846	TQ 43074 60729	1000358	Down House
Holwood Park	II	Keston	Landscape park	1798	TQ4210863862	1000812	Holwood Park
Priory Gardens	II	Orpington	Public park	Late 19th century	TQ 46649 66680	1001444	Priory Gardens
Sundridge Park	II	Sundridge	Landscape park	Late 18th century	TQ 41632 70630	1000841	Sundridge Park

=== Camden ===
Name	Grade	Location	Type	Completed	Grid ref. Geo-coordinates	Entry number	Image
Alexandra Road Park	II*	South Hampstead	Public park	1979	TQ2604583830	1469254	Alexandra Road Park
Bedford Square	II*	Bloomsbury	Garden square	1870s	TQ 29840 81662	1000245	Bedford Square
Bloomsbury Square	II	Bloomsbury	Garden square	1660s	TQ 30336 81674	1000210	Bloomsbury Square
Coram's Fields, with Mecklenburgh and Brunswick Squares	II	King's Cross	Hospital grounds	Mid 18th century	TQ 30496 82277	1000212	Coram's Fields, with Mecklenburgh and Brunswick Squares
Gray's Inn	II*	Holborn	Garden	1770	TQ 30967 81825	1000351	Gray's Inn
Hampstead Cemetery	II	Hampstead	Cemetery	1876	TQ 24869 85577	1001644	Hampstead Cemetery
Highgate Cemetery	I	Highgate	Cemetery	1839	TQ 28414 87057	1000810	Highgate Cemetery
The Hill	II	Hampstead	Camden	1922	TQ 26060 86732	1000244	The Hill
Kenwood	II*	Hampstead	Landscape park	Late 18th century	TQ 27098 87234	1000142	Kenwood
Lincoln's Inn Fields	II	Holborn	Garden square	Early 19th century	TQ 30773 81385	1000819	Lincoln's Inn Fields
Primrose Hill	II	Primrose Hill	Public park	Mid 19th century	TQ 27594 83909	1001526	Primrose Hill
Regent's Park	I	Marylebone	Public park	1827	TQ 27987 82893	1000246	Regent's Park
Russell Square	II	Bloomsbury	Garden square	1806	TQ3008682021	1000213	Russell Square
St George's Gardens	II*	King's Cross	Public park	1889	TQ 30443 82464	1000832	St George's Gardens
St Pancras Gardens	II	St Pancras	Public park	1877	TQ 29739 83503	1001689	St Pancras Gardens
Waterlow Park	II*	Highgate	Public park	1891	TQ 28674 87094	1000849	Waterlow Park

=== City of London ===
Name	Grade	Location	Type	Completed	Grid ref. Geo-coordinates	Entry number	Image
The Barbican	II*	Cripplegate	Housing estate grounds	1982	TQ 32349 81831	1001668	The Barbican
Finsbury Circus	II	Finsbury	Garden square	1817	TQ 32865 81616	1001259	Finsbury Circus
Golden Lane Estate	II	Finsbury	Housing estate grounds	1962	TQ3217482109	1468840	Golden Lane Estate
Middle Temple	II	Temple	Garden	1682	TQ 31144 80848	1001453	Middle Temple

=== Croydon ===
Name	Grade	Location	Type	Completed	Grid ref. Geo-coordinates	Entry number	Image
Addington Palace	II	Addington	Private park	1780s	TQ3661164521	1000790	Addington Palace
Norwood Grove	II	Upper Norwood	Public park	1926	TQ 31195 70599	1000823	Norwood Grove
Promenade de Verdun Memorial Landscape	II	Purley	Memorial garden	1922	TQ2980661612	1431287	Promenade de Verdun Memorial Landscape

=== Ealing ===
Name	Grade	Location	Type	Completed	Grid ref. Geo-coordinates	Entry number	Image
City of Westminster Cemetery	II	Hanwell	Cemetery	1854	TQ 15922 80004	1001543	City of Westminster Cemetery
Royal Borough of Kensington and Chelsea Cemetery	II	Hanwell	Cemetery	1855	TQ 15835 80466	1001544	Royal Borough of Kensington and Chelsea Cemetery
Walpole Park	II	Ealing	Public park	1902	TQ 17397 80242	1000847	Walpole Park

=== Enfield ===
Name	Grade	Location	Type	Completed	Grid ref. Geo-coordinates	Entry number	Image
Broomfield House	II	Palmers Green	Park and garden	Early 18th century	TQ 30412 92729	1000517	Broomfield House
Forty Hall	II	Forty Hill	Park and garden	Late 18th century	TQ 33757 98731	1001357	Forty Hall
Grovelands Park	II*	Southgate	Landscape park	Late 18th century	TQ 30527 94308	1000395	Grovelands Park
Myddelton House	II	Enfield	Garden	1954	TQ 34142 99219	1000243	Myddelton House
Trent Park	II	Cockfosters	Landscape park	Late 18th century	TQ 28735 97589	1000484	Trent Park

=== Greenwich ===
Name	Grade	Location	Type	Completed	Grid ref. Geo-coordinates	Entry number	Image
Eltham Palace	II*	Eltham	Garden	1935	TQ 42461 73950	1001410	Eltham Palace
Greenwich Park	I	Greenwich	Public park	1660s	TQ 39063 77268	1000174	Greenwich Park
Repository Woods	II	Woolwich	Military training area	1800s	TQ4251178100	1001717	Repository Woods
Well Hall Pleasaunce	II	Well Hall	Public park	1936	TQ 42425 75040	1000850	Well Hall Pleasaunce

=== Hackney ===
Name	Grade	Location	Type	Completed	Grid ref. Geo-coordinates	Entry number	Image
Abney Park Cemetery	II	Stoke Newington	Cemetery	1840	TQ 33400 86830	1000789	Abney Park Cemetery
Clissold Park	II	Stoke Newington	Public park	1889	TQ 32643 86470	1000800	Clissold Park
Springfield Park	II	Upper Clapton	Public park	1905	TQ 34629 87518	1000839	Springfield Park

=== Hammersmith and Fulham ===
Name	Grade	Location	Type	Completed	Grid ref. Geo-coordinates	Entry number	Image
Bishops Park	II	Fulham	Public park	1893	TQ 23951 76058	1001677	Bishops Park
Fulham Palace	II*	Fulham	Garden	1760s	TQ 24118 76201	1000133	Fulham Palace
St Peter's Square	II	Hammersmith	Garden square	1830	TQ 22003 78455	1000837	St Peter's Square

=== Haringey ===
Name	Grade	Location	Type	Completed	Grid ref. Geo-coordinates	Entry number	Image
Alexandra Palace	II	Wood Green	Public park	1863	TQ 29667 89984	1001253	Alexandra Palace
Finsbury Park	II	Finsbury Park	Public park	1869	TQ 31719 87513	1000804	Finsbury Park

=== Harrow ===
Name	Grade	Location	Type	Completed	Grid ref. Geo-coordinates	Entry number	Image
Bentley Priory	II	Stanmore	Landscape park	Early 19th century	TQ 15582 92885	1001440	Bentley Priory
Canons Park	II	Stanmore	Public park	1938	TQ1813691988	1001394	Canons Park
Grim's Dyke	II	Harrow Weald	Garden	1870s	TQ 14077 92924	1001254	Grim's Dyke
Harrow Park	II	Harrow on the Hill	Landscape park	1771	TQ1532886993	1001424	Harrow Park

=== Havering ===
Name	Grade	Location	Type	Completed	Grid ref. Geo-coordinates	Entry number	Image
Upminster Court	II	Upminster	Garden	1900s	TQ 56365 87962	1001586	Upminster Court

=== Hillingdon ===
Name	Grade	Location	Type	Completed	Grid ref. Geo-coordinates	Entry number	Image
Harefield Place	II	Harefield	Garden	17th century	TQ 05440 89483	1001525	Upload Photo
Stockley Park	II	Hayes	Business park	1993	TQ0791680469	1466074	Stockley Park

=== Hounslow ===
Name	Grade	Location	Type	Completed	Grid ref. Geo-coordinates	Entry number	Image
Chiswick House	I	Chiswick	Garden	1720s	TQ2083077489	1000111	Chiswick House
Gunnersbury Park	II*	Gunnersbury	Garden	Late 18th century	TQ 18761 78931	1000808	Gunnersbury Park
Osterley Park	II*	Osterley	Park and garden	1760s	TQ 14414 78372	1000287	Osterley Park
Strawberry House	II	Chiswick	Garden	1924	TQ 21859 78091	1000840	Strawberry House
Syon Park	I	Isleworth	Garden	Mid 18th century	TQ 17232 76641	1000148	Syon Park
Walpole House	II	Chiswick	Garden	1920s	TQ 21835 78082	1000846	Walpole House

=== Islington ===
Name	Grade	Location	Type	Completed	Grid ref. Geo-coordinates	Entry number	Image
Bunhill Fields Burial Ground	I	Finsbury	Cemetery	1666	TQ 32693 82267	1001713	Bunhill Fields Burial Ground

=== Kensington and Chelsea ===
Name	Grade	Location	Type	Completed	Grid ref. Geo-coordinates	Entry number	Image
100 Cheyne Walk	II	Chelsea	Garden	1909	TQ 26846 77499	1000799	100 Cheyne Walk
The Boltons	II	Brompton	Garden square	1860s	TQ 26167 78248	1000793	The Boltons
Brompton Cemetery	I	West Brompton	Cemetery	1840	TQ 25719 77766	1000248	Brompton Cemetery
Cadogan Place	II	Belgravia	Garden	1870s	TQ 27953 79085	1000796	Cadogan Place
Chelsea Physic Garden	I	Chelsea	Garden	1673	TQ 27711 77783	1000147	Chelsea Physic Garden
Edwardes Square	II*	Kensington	Garden square	1819	TQ 24999 79118	1000803	Edwardes Square
Hans Place	II	Knightsbridge	Garden square	1770s	TQ 27752 79257	1000809	Hans Place
Holland Park	II	Kensington	Public park	1756	TQ 24820 79810	1000811	Holland Park
Kensal Green Cemetery	I	Kensal Green	Cemetery	1833	TQ 23294 82547	1000817	Kensal Green Cemetery
Ladbroke Estate	II	Notting Hill	Garden square	1868	TQ 24337 80975	1000242	Ladbroke Estate
The Roof Garden, 99 High Street	II	Kensington	Roof garden	1938	TQ 25602 79494	1001406	The Roof Garden, 99 High Street
Roper's Garden	II	Chelsea	Public park	1964	TQ2704477565	1468220	Roper's Garden
Royal Hospital and Ranelagh Gardens	II	Chelsea	Garden	1849	TQ 28091 78055	1000353	Royal Hospital and Ranelagh Gardens
St Luke's Garden	II	Chelsea	Public park	1881	TQ 27198 78303	1000834	St Luke's Garden

=== Lambeth ===
Name	Grade	Location	Type	Completed	Grid ref. Geo-coordinates	Entry number	Image
Brockwell Park	II	Herne Hill	Public park	1892	TQ 31658 74036	1000794	Brockwell Park
Kennington Park	II	Kennington	Public park	1854	TQ 31411 77704	1000816	Kennington Park
Lambeth Palace	II	Lambeth	Garden	1920s	TQ 30673 79175	1000818	Lambeth Palace
Myatt's Fields	II	Camberwell	Public park	1889	TQ 31817 76701	1000822	Myatt's Fields
The Rookery	II	Streatham Common	Public park	1913	TQ 30929 70835	1000829	The Rookery
Ruskin Park	II	Camberwell	Public park	1910	TQ 32503 75749	1000831	Ruskin Park
St Michael's Convent	II	Streatham	Garden	Mid 19th century	TQ 31027 71177	1000836	St Michael's Convent
West Norwood Cemetery and Crematorium	II*	West Norwood	Cemetery	1837	TQ 32249 72131	1000851	West Norwood Cemetery and Crematorium

=== Lewisham ===
Name	Grade	Location	Type	Completed	Grid ref. Geo-coordinates	Entry number	Image
Grove Park Cemetery	II	Grove Park	Cemetery	1935	TQ 41680 71535	1001681	Grove Park Cemetery
Horniman Gardens	II	Forest Hill	Public park	1930	TQ 34811 73217	1000813	Horniman Gardens
Manor House Gardens	II	Lee	Public park	1770s	TQ 39433 74889	1000821	Manor House Gardens

=== Merton ===
Name	Grade	Location	Type	Completed	Grid ref. Geo-coordinates	Entry number	Image
Cannizaro Park	II*	Wimbledon	Public park	Early 18th century	TQ 23097 70664	1000797	Cannizaro Park
Morden Hall Park	II	Morden	Park and garden	1870s	TQ 26230 68244	1001336	Morden Hall Park
South Park Gardens	II	Wimbledon	Public park	1889	TQ 25331 70782	1001398	South Park Gardens
Wimbledon Park	II*	Wimbledon	Public park	1760s	TQ 24703 72394	1000852	Wimbledon Park

=== Newham ===
Name	Grade	Location	Type	Completed	Grid ref. Geo-coordinates	Entry number	Image
City of London Cemetery	I	Aldersbrook	Cemetery	1857	TQ 42257 86441	1000286	City of London Cemetery
West Ham Park	II	West Ham	Public park	1887	TQ 40038 84268	1001685	West Ham Park

=== Redbridge ===
Name	Grade	Location	Type	Completed	Grid ref. Geo-coordinates	Entry number	Image
Valentines Park	II	Gants Hill	Public park	1907	TQ 43606 87640	1000843	Valentines Park
Wanstead Park	II*	Wanstead	Public park	1818	TQ4104087270	1000194	Wanstead Park

=== Richmond upon Thames ===
Name	Grade	Location	Type	Completed	Grid ref. Geo-coordinates	Entry number	Image
Bushy Park	II*	Teddington	Public Park	18th century	TQ 15837 69642	1000281	Bushy Park
Fieldend	II	Twickenham	Housing estate grounds	1960	TQ1579371711	1468495	Upload Photo
Garrick's Villa	II	Hampton	Garden	Late 18th century	TQ 14238 69414	1000805	Garrick's Villa
Ham House	II*	Ham	Garden	Late 17th century	TQ 17390 72752	1000282	Ham House
Hampton Court	I	Hampton	Park and garden	1540	TQ 16570 68051	1000108	Hampton Court
Hampton Court House	II*	Hampton	Garden	1760s	TQ 15292 69025	1000175	Hampton Court House
Strawberry Hill	II*	Twickenham	Garden	18th century	TQ 15871 72275	1000214	Strawberry Hill
Marble Hill	II*	Twickenham	Park and garden	18th century	TQ 17353 73651	1000400	Marble Hill
Pope's Garden	II	Twickenham	Garden	1720s	TQ 15939 72808	1000826	Pope's Garden
Richmond Park	I	Richmond	Public park	Mid 17th century	TQ2022972941	1000828	Richmond Park
Royal Botanic Gardens	I	Kew	Botanic garden	1840s	TQ 17937 76087	1000830	Royal Botanic Gardens
Teddington Cemetery	II	Teddington	Cemetery	1879	TQ 15362 71797	1001547	Teddington Cemetery
York House	II	Twickenham	Garden	1900s	TQ 16579 73388	1001548	York House
Terrace and Buccleuch Gardens	II	Richmond Hill	Public park	1887	TQ 18063 73945	1001551	Terrace and Buccleuch Gardens
Terrace Walk	II*	Richmond Hill	Promenade	1700	TQ 18272 73951	1001552	Terrace Walk

=== Southwark ===
Name	Grade	Location	Type	Completed	Grid ref. Geo-coordinates	Entry number	Image
Belair	II	West Dulwich	Public park	1785	TQ 32767 73305	1000791	Belair
Dulwich Park	II	Dulwich	Public park	1890	TQ 33615 73600	1000416	Dulwich Park
Nunhead Cemetery	II*	Nunhead	Cemetery	1840	TQ 35454 75571	1000824	Nunhead Cemetery
Peckham Rye Park	II	Peckham	Public park	1894	TQ 34890 74840	1000825	Peckham Rye Park
Southwark Park	II	Rotherhithe	Public park	1869	TQ 35191 78949	1000838	Southwark Park

=== Sutton ===
Name	Grade	Location	Type	Completed	Grid ref. Geo-coordinates	Entry number	Image
Carshalton House	II	Carshalton	Garden	1720	TQ 27596 64458	1000798	Carshalton House
Nonsuch Park	II	Cheam	Park and Garden	Late 18th century	TQ 23091 63767	1001672	Nonsuch Park

=== Tower Hamlets ===
Name	Grade	Location	Type	Completed	Grid ref. Geo-coordinates	Entry number	Image
Arnold Circus	II	Bethnal Green	Public park	1900	TQ 33643 82549	1001300	Arnold Circus
Bethnal Green Gardens	II	Bethnal Green	Public park	1875	TQ 34960 82808	1001673	Bethnal Green Gardens
Island Gardens	II	Millwall	Public park	1895	TQ 38400 78331	1000815	Island Gardens
Novo Cemetery	II	Mile End	Cemetery	1855	TQ3612482436	1416421	Novo Cemetery
Victoria Park	II*	Bethnal Green	Public park	1845	TQ3627283847	1000178	Victoria Park

=== Wandsworth ===
Name	Grade	Location	Type	Completed	Grid ref. Geo-coordinates	Entry number	Image
Alton East Estate	II	Roehampton	Housing estate grounds	1955	TQ2254673311	1466474	Alton East Estate
Alton West Estate	II	Roehampton	Housing estate grounds	1961	TQ2181974044	1466474	Alton West Estate
Battersea Park	II*	Battersea	Public park	1854	TQ 28049 77164	1000283	Battersea Park
Grove House	II	Roehampton	Garden	Mid 18th century	TQ 21917 74314	1000419	Grove House
Putney Vale Cemetery	II	Putney Vale	Cemetery	1891	TQ 22330 72643	1000827	Putney Vale Cemetery
Springfield University Hospital	II	Tooting	Hospital grounds	1841	TQ 27072 72561	1001601	Springfield University Hospital
Wandsworth Park	II	Wandsworth	Public park	1903	TQ 24853 75245	1000285	Wandsworth Park

=== Westminster ===
Name	Grade	Location	Type	Completed	Grid ref. Geo-coordinates	Entry number	Image
Belgrave Square	II	Belgravia	Garden square	1825	TQ 28266 79422	1000792	Belgrave Square
Berkeley Square	II	Mayfair	Garden square	1767	TQ 28770 80598	1000516	Berkeley Square
Brunel Estate	II	Westbourne	Housing estate grounds	1974	TQ2515081623	1468695	Brunel Estate
Buckingham Palace Garden	II*	Westminster	Garden	1826	TQ 28785 79554	1000795	Buckingham Palace Garden
Chester Square	II	Belgravia	Garden square	1835	TQ 28509 78951	1001675	Chester Square
Churchill Gardens	II	Pimlico	Housing estate grounds	1962	TQ2913878024	1469043	Churchill Gardens
Dolphin Square Gardens	II	Pimlico	Housing estate grounds	1937	TQ2950078004	1455668	Dolphin Square Gardens
Eaton Square	II	Belgravia	Garden square	1827	TQ 28254 78939	1000801	Eaton Square
Eccleston Square	II	Pimlico	Garden square	1836	TQ 28936 78645	1000802	Eccleston Square
Green Park	II*	St James's	Public park	1826	TQ 28894 79975	1000806	Green Park
Grosvenor Square	II	Mayfair	Garden square	1726	TQ 28378 80796	1000807	Grosvenor Square
Hyde Park	I	Mayfair	Public park	1820s	TQ 27577 80341	1000814	Hyde Park
Kensington Gardens	I	South Kensington	Public park	1730s	TQ 26342 80148	1000340	Kensington Gardens
Parliament Square	II	Westminster	Public square	1950	TQ 30050 79640	1001342	Parliament Square
Pimlico Gardens	II	Pimlico	Public park	1915	TQ2966377939	1469085	Pimlico Gardens
Portman Square and Manchester Square	II	Marylebone	Garden square	1780	TQ 28065 81254	1000820	Portman Square and Manchester Square
St George's Square Garden	II	Pimlico	Garden square	1844	TQ2961278110	1467523	St George's Square Garden
St James's Park	I	St James's	Public park	1828	TQ2945579732	1000483	St James's Park
St James's Square	II	St James's	Garden square	1818	TQ 29510 80343	1000833	St James's Square
Trafalgar Square	I	Charing Cross	Public square	1845	TQ 30007 80447	1001362	Trafalgar Square
Victoria Embankment Gardens	II*	Charing Cross	Public park	1872	TQ 30341 80190	1000844	Victoria Embankment Gardens
Victoria Tower Gardens	II	Westminster	Public park	1879	TQ 30258 79170	1000845	Victoria Tower Gardens
Warwick Square	II	Pimlico	Garden square	1843	TQ 29138 78498	1000848	Warwick Square
The Water Gardens, Burwood Place	II	Paddington	Housing estate grounds	1966	TQ2726381395	1466630	The Water Gardens, Burwood Place
Wilton Crescent	II	Belgravia	Garden square	1827	TQ 28123 79576	1001676	Wilton Crescent
