= Hanwell Cemetery =

Hanwell Cemetery may refer to one of the cemeteries in the town of Hanwell, all of which are near each other:

- City of Westminster Cemetery, Hanwell, Ealing, 31 Uxbridge Road on the south side of the road, W7 3PP
- Royal Borough of Kensington and Chelsea Cemetery, Hanwell, 38 Uxbridge Road on the north side of the road, W7 3PX
- St. Mary's Church, Hanwell, on Church Road, W7 3BZ, the traditional graveyard for Hanwell
