= Wenman Coke =

Wenman Coke may refer to:

- Wenman Coke (died 1776), MP for Norfolk
- Wenman Coke (1828–1907), soldier and politician, grandson of the above
