= Hoveton Hall =

Country house in Norfolk, England

Coordinates: 52.7282°N 1.4282°E

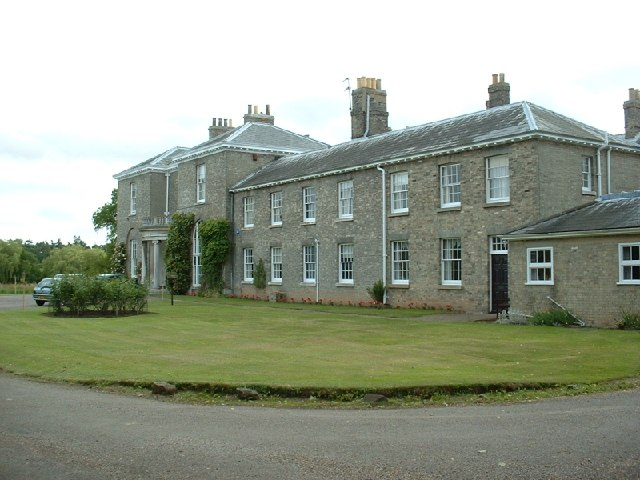
Hoveton Hall in 2005

Hoveton Hall in the parish of Hoveton in Norfolk is a Regency-style country house made of gault brick with a slate roof. It was built between 1809 and 1812, on or near the site of the previous ancient manor house of the same name, by Mrs Christabell Burroughes (1764-1843), daughter and heiress of Henry Negus (1734-1807) of Hoveton Hall, an attorney, and wife of James Burkin Burroughes (1760-1803) of Burlingham Hall, Norfolk. The architect was Humphry Repton. It is a well-preserved historic house of significance on the English Heritage Register. The Negus family had been seated at Hoveton Hall for several generations. The surrounding estate today consists of 120 acres of gardens and parkland and 450 acres of arable land as well as picturesque woodland. The gardens are open to the public during part of the year and there are facilities available for accommodation and special events including weddings.

== Early history of Hoveton Hall Estate ==
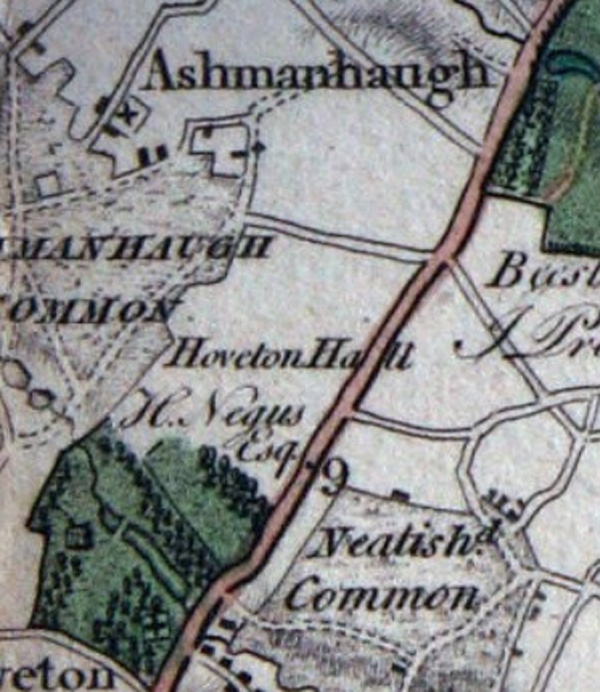
Hoveton Hall marked on Faden's map of 1797 as the seat of "H.Negus Esq."

The exact site of the previous manor house, also called Hoveton Hall, demolished when the new house was built in 1809, is unknown as no part of it survives. However Basil Cozens-Hardy concluded, having analysed old maps and data: "it would seem that the original Hall was near the kitchen garden in the park, as a map and schedule of about 1840 (see map below) calls the field to the south-west "the Old Hall Close” (a "close" being an old term for an enclosed field). Moreover in Faden’s map of 1797 (see image) the Hall is shown at this point with an avenue running down to the road."

== Christabell Burroughes ==
The builder of Hoveton Hall was Mrs Christabell Burroughes who commissioned Humphry Repton to construct the new mansion in 1809.

Christabell was born in 1764, the daughter and heiress of Henry Negus (1734-1807) of Hoveton Hall and of Bungay in Suffolk. The Negus family had been seated at Hoveton Hall for at least five generations, the head of the family always being given the first name Henry.

In 1789 Christabell married James Burkin Burroughes who had inherited Burlingham Hall in Norfolk (now demolished). The couple lived at Burlingham Hall for some time but in 1803 at the early age of 43 James died leaving Christabell to care for seven sons and one daughter.

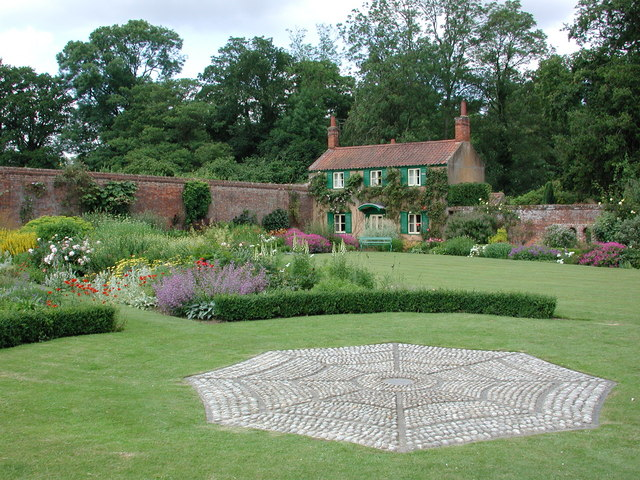
Walled Garden at Hoveton Hall

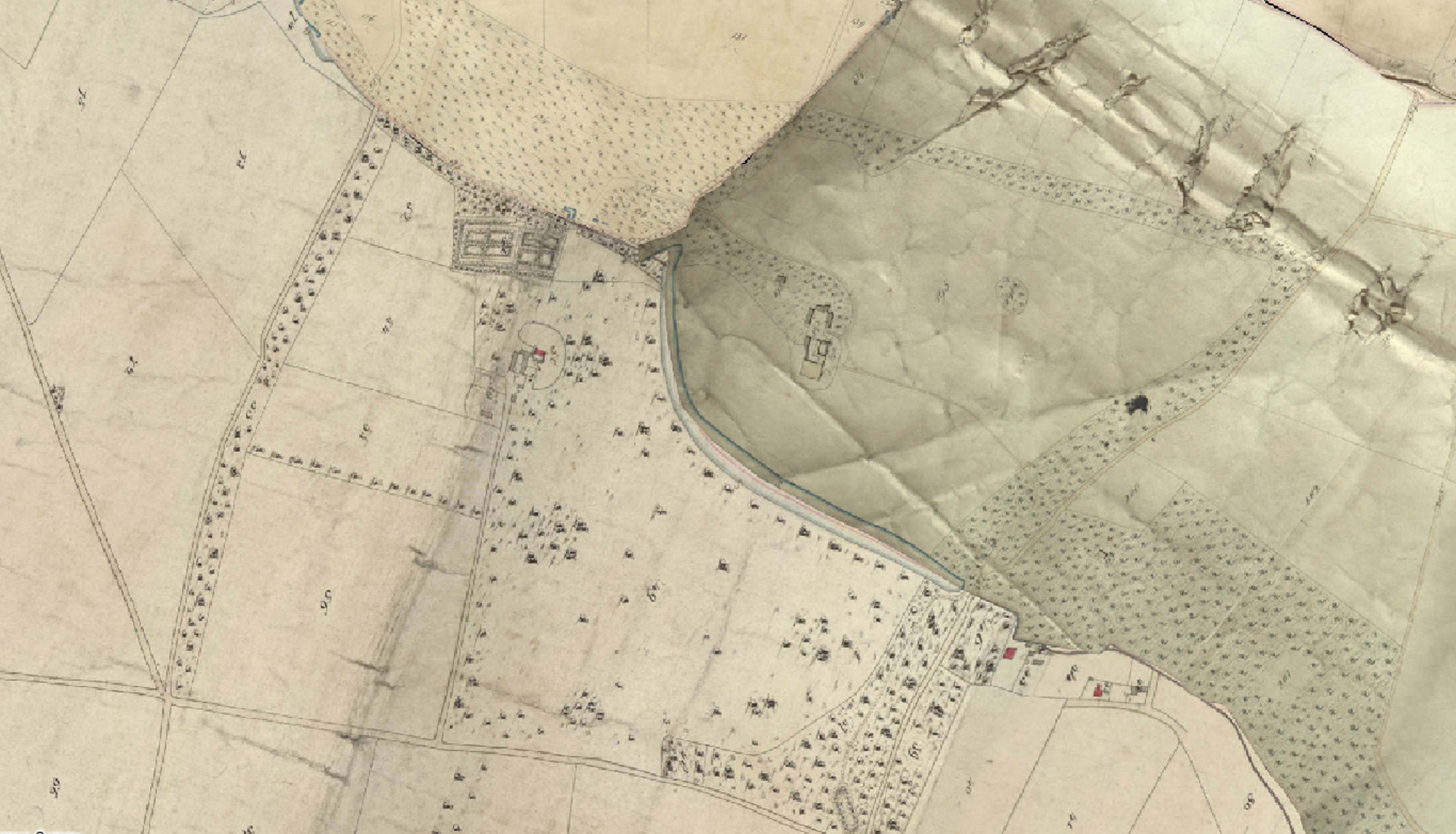
Map of Hoveton Hall in 1840

She remained at Burlingham Hall for several years until the death of her father in 1807, when she inherited from him the Hoveton estate with its old manor house. Possibly because her eldest son, Henry Negus Burroughes (1791-1872) (later an MP for Norfolk), then a minor, was due to reach his majority of 21 in 1812 and thereupon inherit his paternal estate of Burlingham Hall, she decided to build a new house for herself at Hoveton. By 1812 the new house was complete and she moved there from Burlingham Hall with her younger children. She suffered a severe loss three years later when two of her sons James and Edward, students at Cambridge University, died within a week of each other due to an outbreak of an infectious fever.

Christabell was a skilled gardener and was mentioned frequently in the gardening literature of the time. She had built the walled garden by 1828 as it is shown on the Enclosure Map of 1828. In 1841 the botanist James Grigor visited Hoveton Hall and gave a very favourable account of the garden, commenting:

"Though evening was darkening around us when we visited this place, we had sufficient time to perceive that it ranks deservedly high as a seat of general excellence ... Whilst the flower-garden here is of such perfect character, the scenes of the shrubbery and pleasure-ground are of an equally interesting description. The shrubbery is a well-managed piece of work, successfully blended with the lawn of the pleasure-ground, and though modern, already contributing to the general beauty of the place. The most elegant part of the picture lies betwixt the Hall and the kitchen-garden, a locality which art has rendered very ornamental, and where the shrubs are assuming a high degree of beauty. The whole place is so judiciously laid out, that we hazard the opinion that it has been done by someone who has become eminent in his profession. The trees here form a grand sight. They are chiefly of the oak tribe, and at the south-west side of the mansion they rise in the form of an avenue. The elegant manner in which this seat is kept, combined with the extensive and well-assorted collection of flowers and shrubs which it contains, merits our highest praise."

In 1843 Christabell died and her eldest son Henry Negus Burroughes inherited Hoveton Hall.

== Negus family of Hoveton ==
The descent of the Negus family of Hoveton was as follows:

- Henry Negus of Hoveton St Peter, who married Mary Loveland, daughter of John Loveland, hosier and Alderman of Norwich.
  - Elizabeth Negus (1637-1706), daughter, who married Thomas Blofeld (c.1635-1708), 6 times MP for Norwich; the arms of Blofeld impaling Negus were sculpted on the front of Hoveton House, in the parish of Hoveton St John, which he built.
  - Henry Negus of Hoveton, son, who married Deborah Richardson;
    - Henry Negus (born c.1668- ) son, of Hoveton St Peter, Secretary to the Duke of Norfolk and Lord Lieutenant of Norfolk in 1685, Capt. of Militia in 1687. He married Sarah Fowle (Fowke?), daughter of ... Fowle (Fowke?) of Yarmouth;
      - Sarah Negus (1692-1758), daughter, who married Thomas Blofeld (1697-1766) of the Middle Temple and of Hoveton House. Their only child and heiress was Sarah Blofeld (1734-1817), who married her cousin John Blofeld, who inherited Hoveton Hall;
      - Henry Negus (1685-1727), son, who married Christiana Palgrave, a daughter and co-heiress of Thomas Palgrave of Norwich, a brewer;
        - Henry Negus (born 1708) of Hoveton Hall, son, Sheriff of Norfolk in 1740 and Customer (of the Port of Yarmouth?) who married Christabella Johnson, daughter of .... Johnson;
          - Henry Negus (born 1734), son, of Bungay and Hoveton Hall, an attorney, who in 1761 married Mary D'Eye, a daughter and co-heiress of Thomas D'Eye; His funeral hatchment survives in Hoveton Church;
            - Chrisabelle Negus (d.1843), daughter and heiress of Hoveton Hall, who in 1779/80 married James Burkin Burroughes (1760-1803) of Burlingham Hall, Norfolk;
              - Henry Negus Burroughes (1791-1872), son, MP for Norfolk, who in 1818 married firstly Jane Hoste, sister of Sir William Hoste, 1st Baronet.

== Henry Negus Burroughes ==
After he inherited Hoveton Hall in 1843 Henry Negus Burroughes retained Burlingham Hall as his main residence and his younger brother William Burroughes lived at Hoveton Hall for some time.

In about 1850 Hoveton was let to John Gurney (1809-1856) and his wife Laura, whose daughter Catherine Gurney was born there. The prominent and wealthy Gurney family had established the Norwich Bank in Norfolk and John's father the banker Samuel Gurney (1786-1856) was a noted philanthropist. John Gurney moved to his ancestral home Earlham Court a few years later and died there in 1856 at the age of only 44 leaving Laura to care for the children. A century later John's great-grandson Desmond Gurney Buxton purchased Hoveton Hall and lived there for many years (see below).

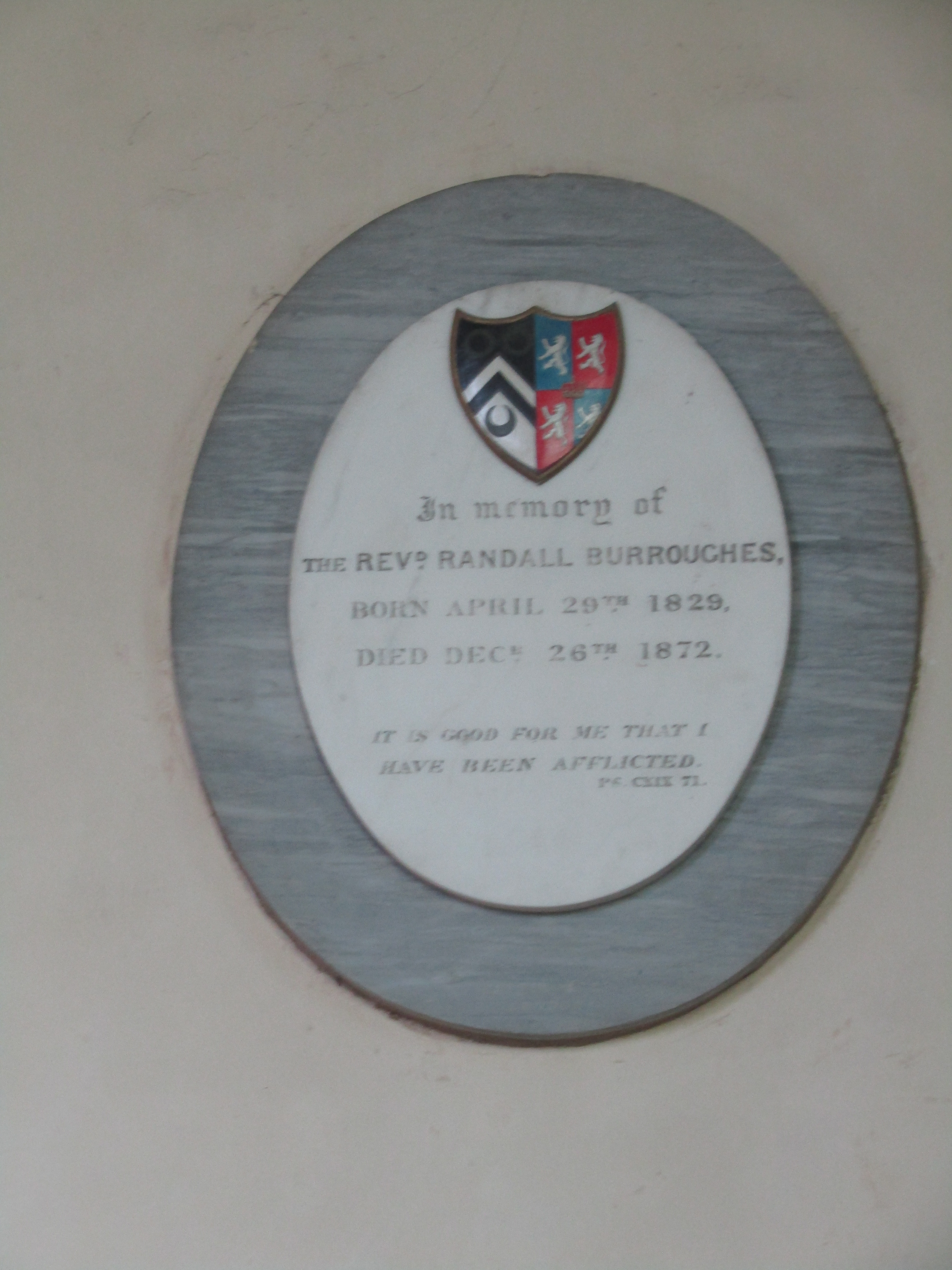
Mural monument to Rev. Randall Burroughes (1829-1872), Saint Peter and Saint Paul’s Church, Honing, Norfolk

After John Gurney quitted Hoveton Hall it became the home of the Reverend Randall Burroughes (1829-1872) who moved there with his family. Randall Burroughes was the son of Henry Negus Burroughes, the son of Hoveton's builder. In 1852 he married Emily Harbord, the daughter of Edward Harbord, 3rd Baron Suffield. The couple lived at Hoveton Hall until Randall's death in 1872. In the same year Henry Negus Burroughes died and Hoveton Hall was sold to Sir Jacob Henry Preston in 1873.

== Sir Jacob Henry Preston ==
Sir Jacob Henry Preston (1812-1891) owned nearby Beeston Hall where he continued to live after he purchased Hoveton Hall. He was related to the Burroughes family by marriage as his sister Pleasance Preston had married Jeremiah Burroughes a younger son of Christabell. After Sir Jacob Preston died in 1891 Hoveton Hall was inherited by his son and subsequently his grandson, Sir Jacob Preston (1887-1818), neither of whom appear to have lived there, instead letting it to tenants.

John Barwell (1825-1912) a wealthy wine merchant and his wife Sabine rented the house from about 1875 until after 1881. A later tenant was Sir James William Malcolm, a captain in the Royal Pembroke Artillery Militia, who lived there from about 1890 to after 1901.

== Twentieth Century Owners ==
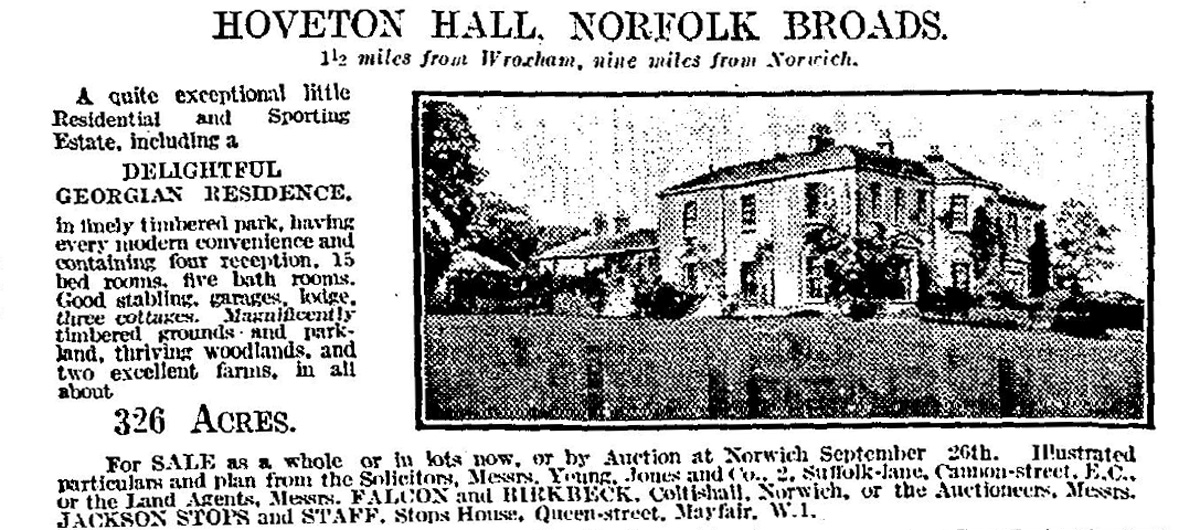
Advertisement for the sale of Hoveton Hall in 1931

In 1912 Sir Jacob Preston, whose grandfather had purchased it, sold Hoveton Hall to the Reverend John Hare Beevor (1861-1914), whose widow Susan continued to live there until 1919 when it was sold.

The new owner was Geoffrey Fowell Buxton (1852-1929), a director of Barclay Bank and a soldier, the second in command of the 1st Battalion of the Norfolk Regiment. In 1903 he served as the mayor of Norwich. When he died in 1929 his widow Mary put the property on the market.

George Cradock bought the house but his wife Eunice having died in 1934 he put the property up for sale the following year. The purchaser was Captain Henry Douglas Clark (1889-1952), the son of a prominent shipbuilder, who made substantial renovations. Finally in 1946 Desmond Buxton bought Hoveton Hall and it has remained in the Buxton family since then.
