= East Norfolk (constituency) =

Parliamentary constituency in the United Kingdom 1832-1868 & 1885-1950

- Former county constituency for the House of Commons
- Context of 1832-1868. Extract from 1837 result: the north-eastern 'doubly' blue land.
- County: Norfolk

1885–1950
- Seats: One
- Created from: North Norfolk and South Norfolk
- Replaced by: North Norfolk, South Norfolk, Central Norfolk and Great Yarmouth

1832–1868
- Seats: Two
- Created from: Norfolk
- Replaced by: North Norfolk and South Norfolk

East Norfolk was a constituency in the county of Norfolk that returned two members of parliament to the House of Commons of the Parliament of the United Kingdom from 1832 until 1868. It was re-established in 1885 with representation of one member. That seat was abolished in 1950.

== History ==
The constituency was first created by the Great Reform Act for the 1832 general election, and abolished for the 1868 general election. In that period the Parliamentary County of Norfolk was split into two divisions – Eastern Norfolk and Western Norfolk, each returning two members.

Further to the Reform Act 1867, Norfolk was reorganised into the North, South and West divisions, with each of the three divisions again returning two members. The Eastern division was replaced by the bulk of the North and South Divisions.

Under the Redistribution of Seats Act 1885, the three two-member county divisions were replaced with six single-member divisions. The second version of this constituency was one of the single-member seats. It was abolished under the Representation of the People Act 1948, which came into effect for the 1950 general election.

== Boundaries and boundary changes ==
=== 1832–1868 ===
- The Hundreds of Blofield, Clavering, Depwade, Diss, Earsham, North Erpingham, South Erpingham, Eynesford, East Flegg, West Flegg, Forehoe, Happing, Henstead, Humbleyard, Loddon, Taversham, Tunstead and Walsham.

=== 1885–1918 ===
- The Sessional Divisions of Blofield and Walsham, East and West Flegg, Taversham, and Tunstead and Happing;
- Part of the Sessional Division of South Erpingham; and
- The part of the Borough of Great Yarmouth in the county of Norfolk.

As Great Yarmouth formed a separate Parliamentary Borough, only non-resident freeholders of the Borough were entitled to vote in this constituency.

=== 1918–1950 ===
- The Urban District of North Walsham; and
- The Rural Districts of Blofield, East and West Flegg, Loddon and Clavering, St Faith's, and Smallburgh.

The division was expanded to the south, with the addition of eastern parts of the Southern Division (Loddon and Clavering Rural District). Also gained small area to the west from the Northern Division.

On its abolition, the contents of the seat were distributed as follows:

- North Walsham and the Rural District of Smallburgh to North Norfolk;
- area to the north and east of Norwich, mostly comprising the (former) Rural District of St Faiths, to the new constituency of Central Norfolk;
- most of the (combined) Rural District of Blofield and Flegg to the new county constituency of Yarmouth; and
- the Rural District of Loddon and Clavering (renamed Loddon) back to South Norfolk.

== Members of Parliament ==
=== 1832–1868 ===
Election	1st member	1st party	2nd member	2nd party
1832	William Windham	Whig	Hon. George Keppel	Whig
1835	Edmond Wodehouse	Conservative	Horatio Walpole	Conservative
1837	Edmond Wodehouse	Conservative	Henry Negus Burroughes	Conservative
1855	Sir Henry Stracey, Bt	Conservative	Henry Negus Burroughes	Conservative
1857	Charles Ash Windham	Whig	Sir Edward Buxton, Bt	Whig
1858	Charles Ash Windham	Whig	Hon. Wenman Coke	Whig
1859	Edward Howes	Conservative	Hon. Wenman Coke	Liberal
1865	Edward Howes	Conservative	Clare Sewell Read	Conservative
1868	constituency abolished			

=== 1885–1950 ===
Year	Member	Party
1885	re-created but reduced to one member	
1885	Sir Edward Birkbeck	Conservative
1892	Sir Robert Price	Liberal
1918	Michael Falcon	Unionist
1923	Hugh Seely	Liberal
1924	Reginald Neville	Unionist
1929	Viscount Elmley	Liberal
1931	Viscount Elmley	Liberal National
1939	Frank Medlicott	Liberal National
1950	constituency abolished	

== Elections ==
Decades:	1830s; 1840s; 1850s; 1860s; 1880s; 1890s; 1900s; 1910s; 1920s; 1930s; 1940s

=== Elections in the 1830s ===
General election 1832: East Norfolk
Party	Candidate	Votes	%
Whig	William Windham	3,304	26.7
Whig	George Keppel	3,261	26.3
Tory	Nathaniel Peach	2,960	23.9
Tory	William Cholmondeley	2,852	23.0
Majority		301	2.4
Turnout		6,229	88.5
Registered electors		7,041	
Whig win (new seat)			
Whig win (new seat)			

General election 1835: East Norfolk
Party	Candidate	Votes	%	±%
Conservative	Edmond Wodehouse	3,482	27.6	+3.7
Conservative	Horatio Walpole	3,196	25.3	+2.3
Whig	William Windham	3,076	24.4	−2.3
Whig	Richard Hanbury Gurney	2,866	22.7	−3.6
Majority		616	4.9	N/A
Majority		120	0.9	N/A
Turnout		6,385	87.7	−0.8
Registered electors		7,281		
Conservative gain from Whig		Swing	+3.3	
Conservative gain from Whig		Swing	+2.6	

General election 1837: East Norfolk
Party	Candidate	Votes	%	±%
Conservative	Edmond Wodehouse	3,654	27.3	−0.3
Conservative	Henry Negus Burroughes	3,523	26.3	+1.0
Whig	William Windham	3,237	24.2	−0.2
Whig	Richard Hanbury Gurney	2,978	22.2	−0.5
Majority		286	2.1	+1.2
Turnout		6,759	81.0	−6.7
Registered electors		8,343		
Conservative hold		Swing	±0.0	
Conservative hold		Swing	+0.7	

=== Elections in the 1840s ===
General election 1841: East Norfolk
Party	Candidate	Votes	%	±%
Conservative	Edmond Wodehouse	3,495	42.1	+14.8
Conservative	Henry Negus Burroughes	3,434	41.3	+15.0
Whig	William ffolkes	1,378	16.6	−29.8
Majority		2,056	24.8	+22.7
Turnout		c. 4,843	c. 56.6	c. −24.4
Registered electors		8,556		
Conservative hold		Swing	+14.9	
Conservative hold		Swing	+15.0	

General election 1847: East Norfolk
Party	Candidate	Votes	%	±%
Conservative	Edmond Wodehouse	Unopposed		
Conservative	Henry Negus Burroughes	Unopposed		
Registered electors		8,638		
Conservative hold				
Conservative hold				

=== Elections in the 1850s ===
General election 1852: East Norfolk
Party	Candidate	Votes	%	±%
Conservative	Edmond Wodehouse	Unopposed		
Conservative	Henry Negus Burroughes	Unopposed		
Registered electors		8,216		
Conservative hold				
Conservative hold				

Wodehouse resigned via accepting the office of Steward of the Manor of Hempholme, causing a by-election.

By-election, 17 July 1855: East Norfolk
Party	Candidate	Votes	%	±%
Conservative	Henry Stracey	Unopposed		
Conservative hold				

General election 1857: East Norfolk
Party	Candidate	Votes	%	±%
Whig	Charles Ash Windham	Unopposed		
Whig	Edward Buxton	Unopposed		
Registered electors		7,755		
Whig gain from Conservative				
Whig gain from Conservative				

Buxton's death caused a by-election.

By-election, 1 July 1858: East Norfolk
Party	Candidate	Votes	%	±%
Whig	Wenman Coke	2,933	51.9	N/A
Conservative	Henry Stracey	2,720	48.1	New
Majority		213	3.8	N/A
Turnout		5,653	72.9	N/A
Registered electors		7,755		
Whig hold		Swing	N/A	

General election 1859: East Norfolk
Party	Candidate	Votes	%	±%
Liberal	Wenman Coke	Unopposed		
Conservative	Edward Howes	Unopposed		
Registered electors		7,776		
Liberal hold				
Conservative gain from Liberal				

=== Elections in the 1860s ===
General election 1865: East Norfolk
Party	Candidate	Votes	%	±%
Conservative	Edward Howes	3,100	30.3	N/A
Conservative	Clare Sewell Read	2,985	29.2	N/A
Liberal	Sir Thomas Proctor-Beauchamp, 4th Baronet	2,150	21.0	N/A
Liberal	Wenman Coke	1,994	19.5	N/A
Majority		991	10.7	N/A
Turnout		5,115 (est)	64.4 (est)	N/A
Registered electors		7,939		
Conservative hold		Swing	N/A	
Conservative gain from Liberal		Swing	N/A	

=== Elections in the 1880s ===
General election 1885: East Norfolk
Party	Candidate	Votes	%	±%
Conservative	Edward Birkbeck	4,682	51.3	
Liberal	Philip Falk	4,440	48.7	
Majority		242	2.6	
Turnout		9,122	81.7	
Registered electors		11,161		
Conservative win (new seat)				

General election 1886: East Norfolk
Party	Candidate	Votes	%	±%
Conservative	Edward Birkbeck	4,578	53.4	+2.1
Liberal	Henry Lee-Warner	4,000	46.6	−2.1
Majority		578	6.8	+4.2
Turnout		8,578	76.9	−4.8
Registered electors		11,161		
Conservative hold		Swing	−2.1	

=== Elections in the 1890s ===
Price

General election 1892: East Norfolk
Party	Candidate	Votes	%	±%
Liberal	Robert Price	4,743	52.4	+5.8
Conservative	Edward Birkbeck	4,303	47.6	−5.8
Majority		440	4.8	N/A
Turnout		9,046	92.2	+15.3
Registered electors		9,812		
Liberal gain from Conservative		Swing	+5.8	

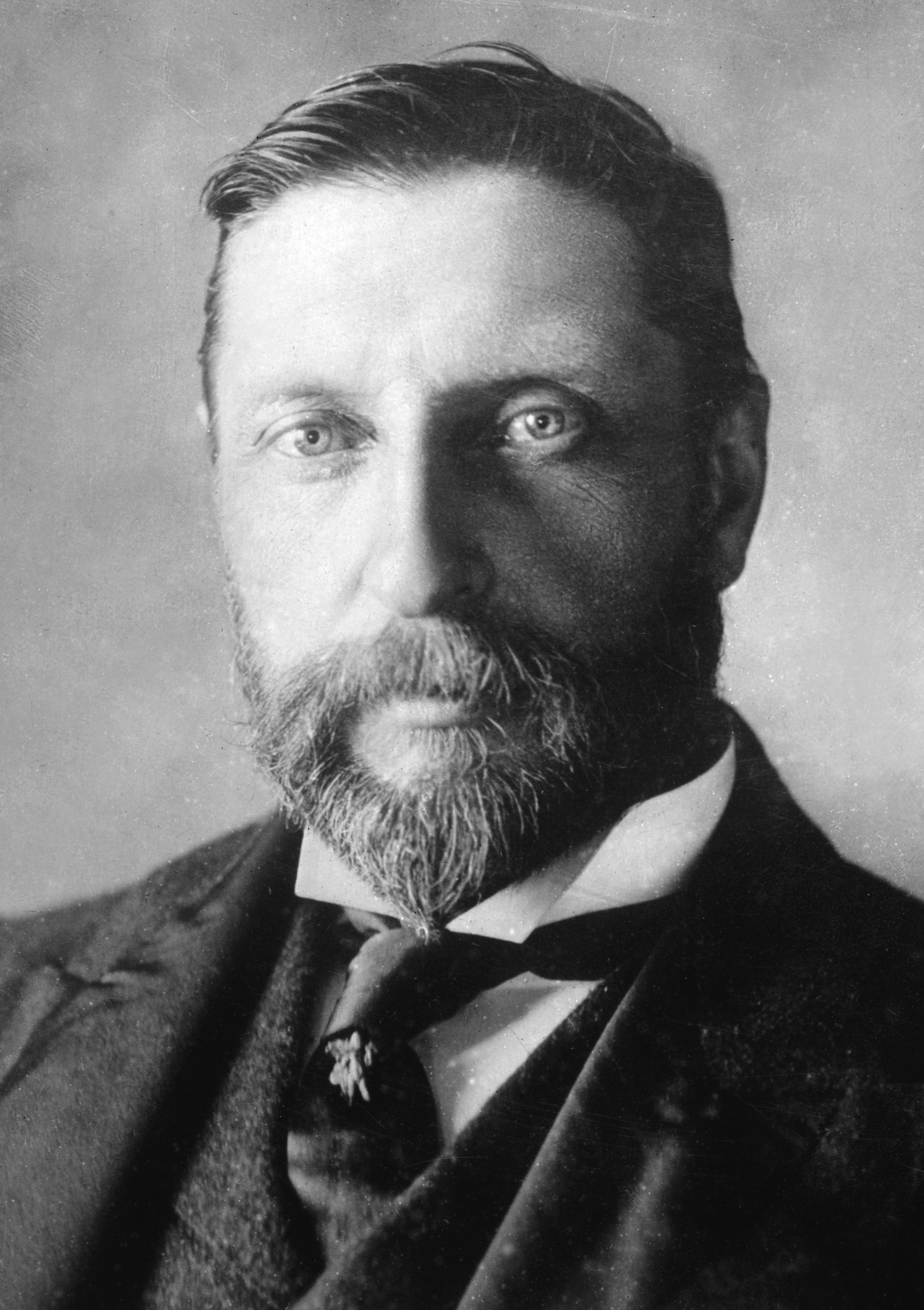
Haggard

General election 1895: East Norfolk
Party	Candidate	Votes	%	±%
Liberal	Robert Price	4,606	51.1	−1.3
Conservative	H. Rider Haggard	4,408	48.9	+1.3
Majority		198	2.2	−2.6
Turnout		9,014	83.2	−9.0
Registered electors		10,839		
Liberal hold		Swing	−1.3	

=== Elections in the 1900s ===
General election 1900: East Norfolk
Party	Candidate	Votes	%	±%
Liberal	Robert Price	4,563	55.0	+3.9
Conservative	William Louis St. John Prioleau	3,733	45.0	−3.9
Majority		830	10.0	+7.8
Turnout		8,296	76.9	−6.3
Registered electors		10,791		
Liberal hold		Swing	+3.9	

General election 1906: East Norfolk
Party	Candidate	Votes	%	±%
Liberal	Robert Price	5,631	62.1	+7.1
Conservative	Sir Raymond Boileau, 4th Baronet	3,435	37.9	−7.1
Majority		2,196	24.2	+14.2
Turnout		9,066	80.7	+3.8
Registered electors		11,237		
Liberal hold		Swing	+7.1	

=== Elections in the 1910s ===
General election January 1910: East Norfolk
Party	Candidate	Votes	%	±%
Liberal	Robert Price	5,592	56.3	−5.8
Conservative	Cecil Fitch	4,348	43.7	+5.8
Majority		1,244	12.6	−11.6
Turnout		9,940	86.0	+5.3
Registered electors		11,560		
Liberal hold		Swing	−5.8	

General election December 1910: East Norfolk
Party	Candidate	Votes	%	±%
Liberal	Robert Price	5,265	57.7	+1.4
Conservative	Frank Meyer	3,865	42.3	−1.4
Majority		1,400	15.4	+2.8
Turnout		9,130	79.0	−7.0
Registered electors		11,560		
Liberal hold		Swing	+1.4	

General election 1914–15:

Another general election was required to take place before the end of 1915. The political parties had been making preparations for an election to take place and by July 1914, the following candidates had been selected;

- Liberal: Robert Price
- Unionist:

General election 1918: Norfolk East
Party		Candidate	Votes	%	±%
C	Unionist	Michael Falcon	7,030	44.9	+2.6
	Liberal	Fred Henderson	6,691	42.8	−14.9
	National Farmers Union	W. B. Taylor	1,926	12.3	New
Majority			339	2.1	N/A
Turnout			15,647	49.6	−29.4
Registered electors			31,578		
	Unionist gain from Liberal		Swing	+8.8	
C indicates candidate endorsed by the coalition government.

=== Elections in the 1920s ===
General election 1922: Norfolk East
Party	Candidate	Votes	%	±%
Unionist	Michael Falcon	9,270	41.0	−3.9
Liberal	Hugh Seely	8,962	39.7	−3.1
Labour	George Edward Hewitt	4,361	19.3	New
Majority		308	1.3	−0.8
Turnout		22,593	70.2	+20.6
Registered electors		32,204		
Unionist hold		Swing	−0.4	

General election 1923: Norfolk East
Party	Candidate	Votes	%	±%
Liberal	Hugh Seely	11,807	49.6	+9.9
Unionist	Michael Falcon	8,472	35.6	−5.4
Labour	George Edward Hewitt	3,530	14.8	−4.5
Majority		3,335	14.0	N/A
Turnout		23,809	72.5	+2.3
Registered electors		32,845		
Liberal gain from Unionist		Swing	+7.7	

General election 1924: Norfolk East
Party	Candidate	Votes	%	±%
Unionist	Reginald Neville	11,283	44.6	+9.0
Liberal	Hugh Seely	9,114	36.0	−13.6
Labour	Reginald Barrington Bates	4,907	19.4	+4.6
Majority		2,169	8.6	N/A
Turnout		25,304	75.6	+3.1
Registered electors		33,470		
Unionist gain from Liberal		Swing	+11.3	

General election 1929: Norfolk East
Party	Candidate	Votes	%	±%
Liberal	Viscount Elmley	13,349	39.6	+3.6
Unionist	Reginald Neville	12,434	37.0	−7.6
Labour	Bill Holmes	7,856	23.4	+4.0
Majority		915	2.6	N/A
Turnout		33,639	77.6	+2.0
Liberal gain from Unionist		Swing	+5.6	

=== Elections in the 1930s ===
General election 1931: Norfolk East
Party	Candidate	Votes	%	±%
National Liberal	Viscount Elmley	25,945	79.8	+42.8
Labour	Bill Holmes	6,562	20.2	−3.2
Majority		19,383	59.6	+57.0
Turnout		32,507	71.7	−5.9
National Liberal hold		Swing		

General election 1935: Norfolk East
Party	Candidate	Votes	%	±%
National Liberal	Viscount Elmley	23,108	68.8	−11.0
Labour	Norman Reeve Tillett	10,461	31.2	+11.0
Majority		12,647	37.6	−22.0
Turnout		33,569	66.8	−4.9
National Liberal hold		Swing	−11.0	

1939 East Norfolk by-election
Party	Candidate	Votes	%	±%
National Liberal	Frank Medlicott	18,257	62.9	−5.9
Labour	Norman Reeve Tillett	10,785	37.1	+5.9
Majority		7,472	25.8	−11.8
Turnout		29,042	53.1	−13.7
National Liberal hold		Swing	−5.9	

General election 1939–40

Until the parliament elected in 1935 was extended, another general election was required to take place before the end of 1940. The political parties made preparations for an election to take place, and by the autumn of 1939, the following candidates had been selected;

- Liberal National: Frank Medlicott
- Labour: Norman Reeve Tillett
- Independent Conservative: James F. Wright (Secretary, Norfolk Farmers Union)

=== Elections in the 1940s ===
General election 1945: Norfolk East
Party	Candidate	Votes	%	±%
National Liberal	Frank Medlicott	23,307	55.8	−13.0
Labour	Norman Reeve Tillett	18,467	44.2	+13.0
Majority		4,840	11.6	−26.0
Turnout		41,774	68.9	+2.1
National Liberal hold		Swing	−7.1	
