= Edmond Wodehouse (Norfolk MP) =

British politician

Edmund Wodehouse (26 July 1784 – 21 August 1855) was a British politician.

== Background ==
Wodehouse was the son of Thomas Wodehouse, younger son of Sir Armine Wodehouse, 5th Baronet, and brother of John Wodehouse, 1st Baron Wodehouse. His mother was Sarah, daughter of Pryse Campbell.

== Political career ==
Wodehouse entered Parliament as one of two representatives for Norfolk in 1817, a seat he held until 1830. He was then a Tory. Between 1835 and 1855 he was Conservative Member of Parliament (MP) for Norfolk East.

== Family ==
Wodehouse married his first cousin, Lucy, daughter of Reverend Philip Wodehouse, in 1809. They had several children, including Sir Philip Wodehouse and General Edmund Wodehouse. She died in June 1829. Wodehouse remained a widower until his death in August 1855, aged 76.

== See also ==
- Earl of Kimberley

Parliament of the United Kingdom
Preceded by Sir Jacob Astley, Bt; Thomas Coke	Member of Parliament for Norfolk; 1817–1830; With: Thomas Coke	Succeeded by Thomas Coke; Sir William ffolkes, Bt
Preceded by William Windham; Hon. George Keppel	Member of Parliament for Norfolk East; 1835–1855; With: Lord Walpole 1835–1837; Henry Negus Burroughes 1837–1855	Succeeded by Henry Negus Burroughes; Sir Henry Stracey, Bt
