= Charles Ash Windham =

British Army officer and politician (1810–1870)

General Sir Charles Ash Windham KCB
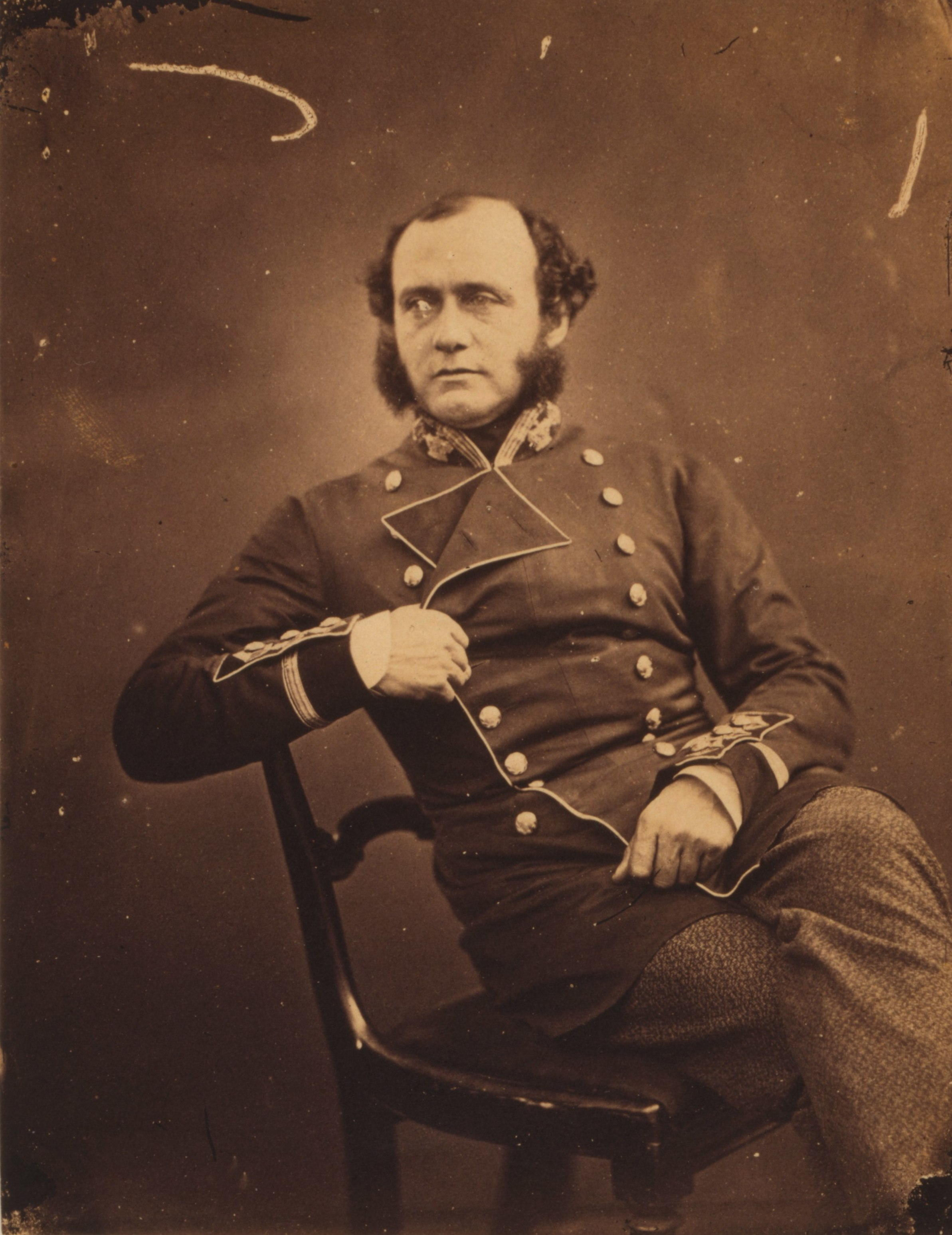
- Charles Ash Windham, 1855
- Born: 10 October 1810; Felbrigg, Norfolk
- Died: 1870 (aged 59–60); Jacksonville, Florida
- Burial place: Hanwell cemetery
- Military career
- Allegiance: United Kingdom
- Branch: British Army
- Rank: General
- Conflicts: Crimean War

General Sir Charles Ash Windham (10 October 1810 – 2 February 1870) was a British Army officer and Liberal Party politician.

== Biography ==
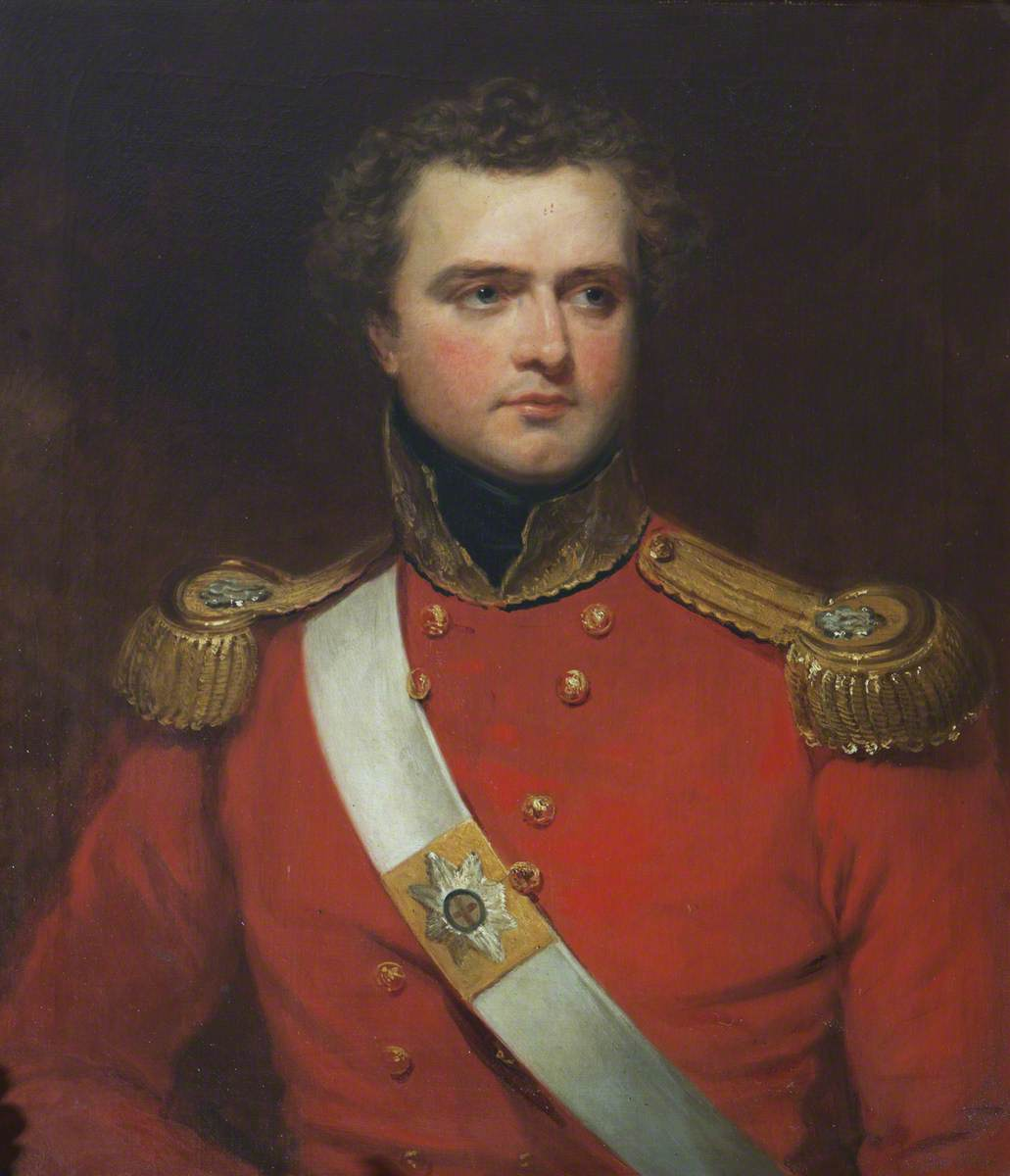
Portrait of Windham as a captain in 1833

Educated at the Royal Military College, Sandhurst, Windham was commissioned as an ensign in the Coldstream Guards on 30 December 1826. Windham married Marianne Catherine Emily Beresford, daughter of Admiral Sir John Beresford, 1st Baronet, on 1 March 1849.

He led the charge on the Great Redan to the south of the Malakoff redoubt at Sevastopol on 8 September 1855 during the Battle of the Great Redan in the Crimean War. William Howard Russell, the correspondent of The Times, claimed that in doing so Windham had "saved the honour of the army". He also fought in the Second Battle of Cawnpore during the Indian Rebellion.

The Windham family were lords of the manor of Metton, Norfolk. Windham became a Member of Parliament (MP) for East Norfolk and held the seat from 1857 to 1859.

Promoted to lieutenant-general on 5 February 1866, he became Commander of the British Troops in Canada in October 1867.

Windham died in Florida, was interred temporarily in Montreal and finally buried in Hanwell cemetery, Middlesex, England.

Parliament of the United Kingdom
Preceded by Sir Henry Stracey, Bt; Henry Burroughes	Member of Parliament for East Norfolk; 1857–1859; With: Sir Edward Buxton, Bt 1857–58; Hon. Wenman Coke	Succeeded by Wenman Coke; Edward Howes
Military offices
Preceded by Sir John Michel	Commander of the British Troops in Canada; 1867–1870	Succeeded by Sir Charles Doyle
