= List of public art in the London Borough of Croydon =

This is a list of public art in the London Borough of Croydon.

== Coombe ==
Image	Title / subject	Location and coordinates	Date	Artist / designer	Architect / other	Type	Designation	Notes
	Bench (with a relief carving of a centaur)	Coombe Wood Garden	c. 1925–1930	Eric Gill	—N/a	Concrete bench	—N/a	

== Croydon ==
Image	Title / subject	Location and coordinates	Date	Artist / designer	Architect / other	Type	Designation	Notes
	Statue of John Whitgift	Outside Croydon Library, Katharine Street	c. 1903	John Wenlock Rollins	Charles Henman Jr.	Architectural sculpture	Grade II	
More images	Statue of Queen Victoria	Outside Croydon Library, Katharine Street	1903	Francis John Williamson	—N/a	Statue	Grade II	
More images	Croydon Cenotaph	Outside Croydon Library, Katharine Street 51.3723°N 0.0994°W	1921	Paul Raphael Montford	James Burford	War memorial	Grade II*	
	War memorial	Outside Croydon Minster, Church Street 51.3725°N 0.1062°W	c. 1930 (after an original of 1922)	—N/a	Charles Marriott Oldrid Scott	Memorial cross	Grade II	The original memorial of Chilmark stone was unveiled 27 February 1922; it was destroyed in a storm c. 1930 and replaced by the current memorial of Portland stone.
	Minerva	Croydon College	c. 1953–1959	?	Robert Atkinson and Partners	Relief	—N/a	
	Vulcan	Croydon College	c. 1953–1959	?	Robert Atkinson and Partners	Relief	—N/a	
More images	Jorrocks	96 George Street	1982	John W. Mills	—N/a	Equestrian statue	—N/a	
More images	Ronnie Corbett, Samuel Coleridge-Taylor and Peggy Ashcroft	Charles Street	2013	?	—N/a	Sculpture	—N/a	Figures selected by a public vote. Part of the Sustrans Portrait Benches series.
	Winston Churchill mural	Corner of Park Street and High Street	2016	David Hollier	—N/a	Mural	—N/a	
	Electric City	Corner of Park Street and High Street 51.3732°N 0.0999°W	2018	Dan Kitchener	—N/a	mural	—N/a	30 by 30 ft (9 by 9 m), freehand spray paint. Painted in 2.5 days in May 2018.

=== Croydon Airport ===
Image	Title / subject	Location and coordinates	Date	Artist / designer	Architect / other	Type	Designation	Notes
More images	De Havilland Heron	Entrance to Croydon Airport	1997					
More images	Battle of Britain War Memorial	Purley Way, outside Croydon Airport	1991					

== Old Coulsdon ==
Image	Title / subject	Location and coordinates	Date	Artist / designer	Architect / other	Type	Designation	Notes
More images	Old Coulsdon War Memorial	Junction of Coulsdon Road and Canon's Hill 51.3074°N 0.1200°W	1919	?	?	Memorial cross	Grade II	Unveiled 14 September 2019.

== Selhurst ==
Image	Title / subject	Location and coordinates	Date	Artist / designer	Architect / other	Type	Designation	Notes
	Selhurst War Memorial	Trinity Court, Selhurst Road 51.3899°N 0.0885°W	1922	Arthur Hook	—N/a	Celtic cross	Grade II	Unveiled 25 November 1922. Originally stood outside Holy Trinity Church on this site, which was demolished in the 1980s.
	Lion and unicorn	Sydenham Road, at entrance to King George's Field	1936					

== Woodcote ==
Image	Title / subject	Location and coordinates	Date	Artist / designer	Architect / other	Type	Designation	Notes
	Promenade de Verdun War Memorial	Promenade de Verdun 51.3367°N 0.1360°W	1922	?	?	War memorial	Grade II	
