= Robert Price (Liberal politician) =

British politician

Robert John Price

Sir Robert John Price (26 April 1854 – 18 April 1926) was a British surgeon, barrister and Liberal Party politician. He sat in the House of Commons from 1892 to 1918, and was one of only a few British politicians to have also pursued careers in both medicine and the law.

He was the son of Edward Price of Highgate, North London and his wife Elvina née Mountford. He was educated at Cholmeley School, better known as Highgate School, in Highgate and at University College Hospital, where he graduated M.R.C.S.E. in 1876. He was called to the bar at the Middle Temple in 1883.

Price elected at the 1892 general election as the Member of Parliament (MP) for East Norfolk, and held the seat until he retired from Parliament at the 1918 general election.

He was knighted in 1908.

Price died on 18 April 1926, at age 71, at Sussex Mansions in London.

== Personal life ==
In 1881 he married Eva Montgomery, daughter of Jasper Wilson Johns, who had been a Liberal MP for the Nuneaton division of Warwickshire.

Parliament of the United Kingdom
Preceded by Sir Edward Birkbeck	Member of Parliament for East Norfolk; 1892 – 1918	Succeeded by Michael Falcon
