= Promenade de Verdun War Memorial =

War memorial in Purley, London Borough of Croydon, England

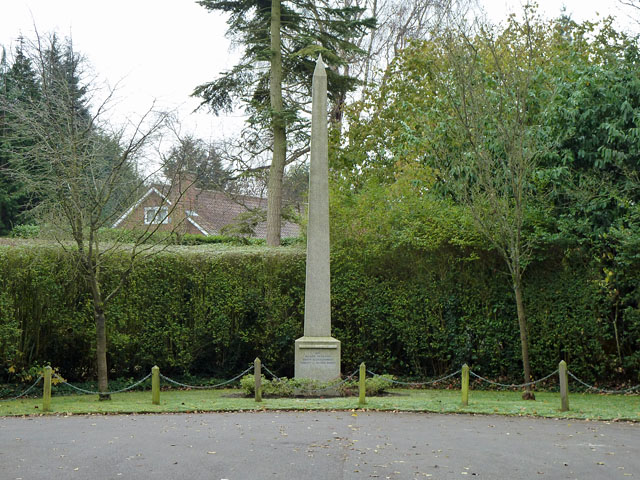

- Location within Greater London
- 51.3367°N 0.136°W
- Type: War memorial
- Location: Woodcote, Purley, London Borough of Croydon

History
- Built: 1922

National Register of Historic Parks and Gardens
- Official name: Promenade de Verdun Memorial Landscape
- Designated: 18 February 2016
- Reference no.: 1431287

Listed Building – Grade II
- Official name: Promenade de Verdun War Memorial
- Designated: 18 February 2016
- Reference no.: 1431367

The Promenade de Verdun War Memorial is a First World War memorial in the garden village of Woodcote, Purley, in the London Borough of Croydon, England. It was designed by a local surveyor, William Webb, who had laid out the garden village in the early 20th century. Webb determined on a memorial to the soldiers of France who were killed in the First World War; as a commemoration of their sacrifice, and as a means to foster good relations between the United Kingdom and the Republic of France. The memorial consists of a 0.5 km boulevard, lined with Lombardy poplars planted in 10 tonnes of soil brought from France, and culminating in a 6m high obelisk carved from Cornish granite. The obelisk is inscribed; "AUX/ SOLDATS DE FRANCE/ MORTS GLORIEUSEMENT/ PENDANT LA GRAND GUERRE" and was unveiled in 1922. The stone is a Grade II listed structure and the setting is registered on the Register of Historic Parks and Gardens of Special Historic Interest in England.

== History ==
Woodcote Garden Village was laid out in the early 20th century by William Webb (1862–1930), a surveyor and businessman from Kent. Webb bought the land in the 1890s and construction of the village took place between 1901 and 1920. (Note: William Webb was committed to developing the Woodcote Estate as a garden suburb, reflecting an approach he called "Garden First". The buildings' architects were required to work in close cooperation with the landscape architects in the creation of the estate.) Work was interrupted by the First World War, and at its end, Webb determined on the establishment of a memorial to the soldiers of France who had died in the conflict. His joint aims were to honour the dead of Britain's greatest ally and to cement good relations between the two countries. At the time of the memorial's construction, post-war relations between France and England were at a low ebb, due to differences in approach as to how to extract war reparations from their joint enemy, Germany.

The memorial's name, Verdun, is taken from the Battle of Verdun, which took place on the Western Front in France from 21 February to 18 December 1916 and was the longest engagement of the First World War. The French and the German armies each sustained over a third of a million casualties. In 2016, to commemorate the centenary of the battle, the war memorial and its setting were among three in Britain recognising French sacrifice which were given listed building status. (Note: Along with the Verdun obelisk and the Promenade de Verdun Memorial Landscape, the other monuments listed or upgraded were La Délivrance in the London Borough of Barnet and the statue of Marshal Foch in central London.)

Many of the trees which line the avenue were destroyed in the Great storm of 1987. Croydon London Borough Council, which owns and operates the site, has since undertaken replanting.

== Description ==
Webb chose a slightly rising site for the memorial and laid out a 0.5 km boulevard which culminates in the obelisk carved from a single slab of Cornish granite. The road is lined with lined with Lombardy poplars, to echo traditional French street planting, bedded in 10 tonnes of soil brought from France. The soil, donated by the French government, came from Armentières on the Franco-Belgian border. It was sifted prior to use and two sack loads of shrapnel and bullets were extracted. The memorial landscape is listed at Grade II on the Register of Historic Parks and Gardens of Special Historic Interest in England. The obelisk is a Grade II listed structure. It carries the inscription: "AUX/ SOLDATS DE FRANCE/ MORTS GLORIEUSEMENT/ PENDANT LA GRAND GUERRE".

== Gallery ==
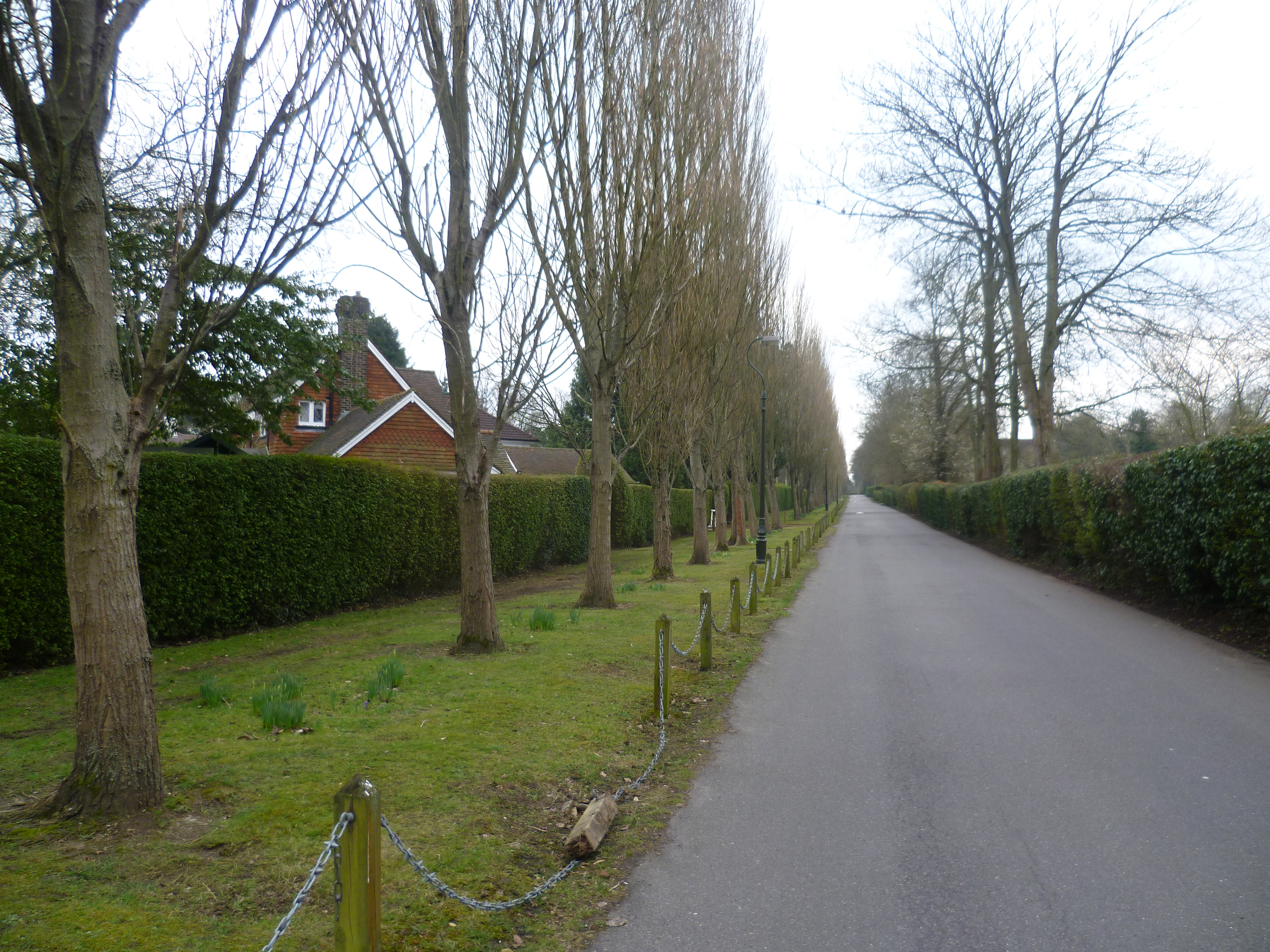
The promenade

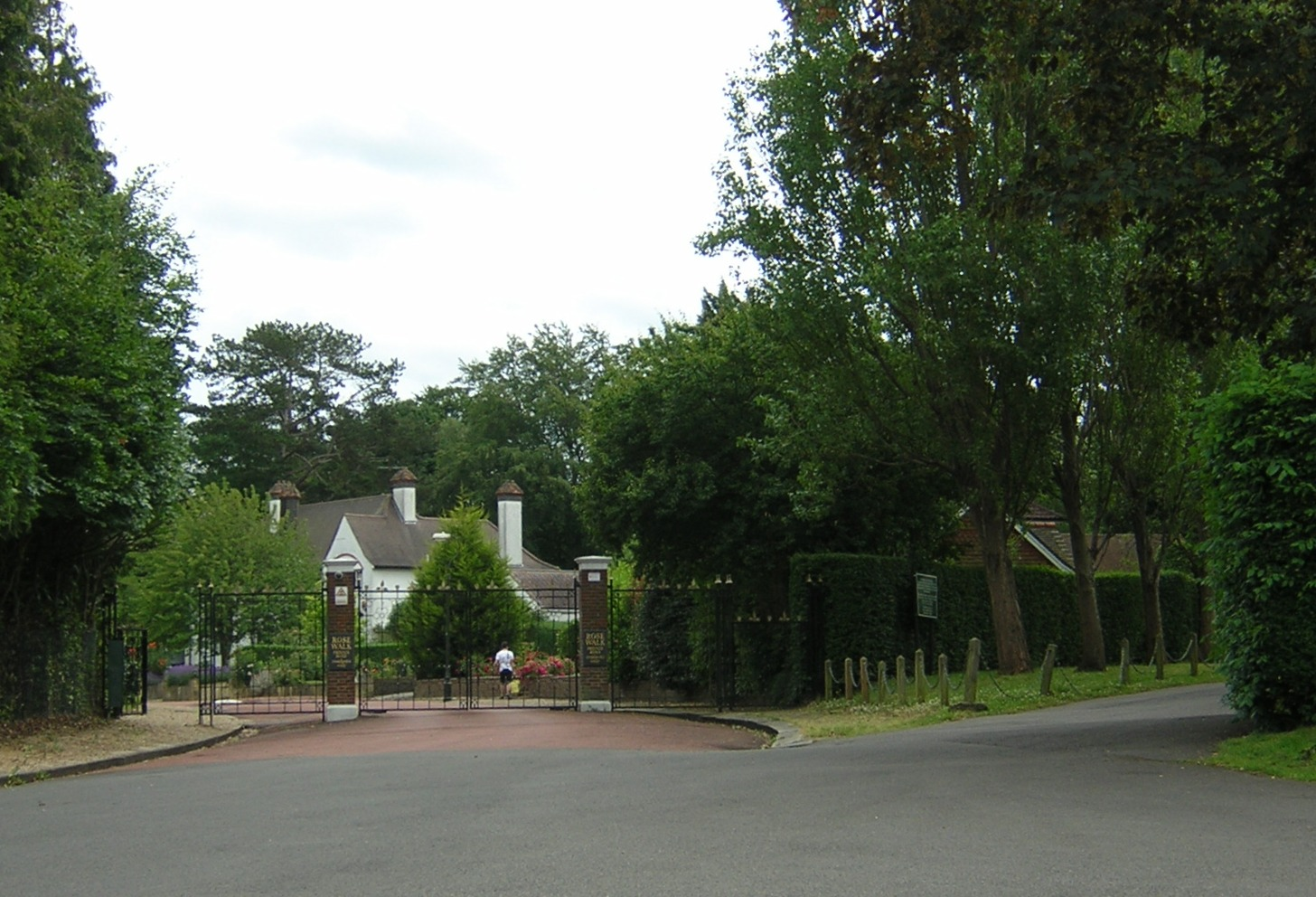
Junction of the promenade and Rose Walk

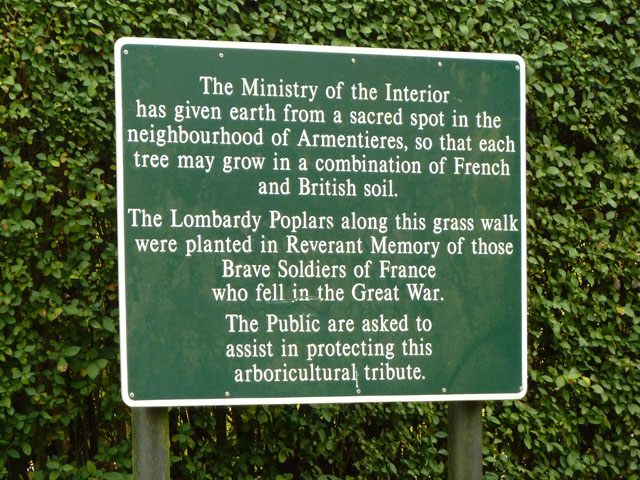
Information panel

== See also ==
- Listed parks and gardens in Greater London
- List of public art in the London Borough of Croydon
- Grade I listed war memorials in England
- Grade II* listed war memorials in England

== Sources ==
- Jankowski, Paul (2014). Verdun: The Longest Battle of the Great War. Oxford: Oxford University Press. ISBN 978-0-199-31689-2. OCLC 945718459.
- Pevsner, Nikolaus; Cherry, Bridget (2002). London 2: South. The Buildings of England. New Haven and London: Yale University Press. ISBN 978-0-300-09651-4. OCLC 719418472.
