= Michael Falcon =

British politician and cricketer

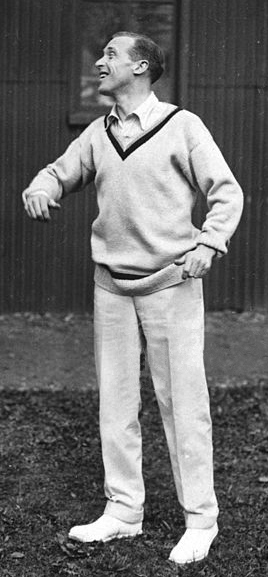
- Falcon in 1926

Personal information
- Born: 21 July 1888; Norwich, Norfolk
- Died: 27 February 1976 (aged 87); Norwich, Norfolk
- Batting: Right-handed
- Bowling: Right-arm fast-medium
- Relatives: Harry Falcon (brother)

Domestic team information
- Years: Team
- 1907–1946: Norfolk
- 1908–1911: Cambridge University
- 1912–1936: Free Foresters

Career statistics
Competition	First-class
Matches	89
Runs scored	3,282
Batting average	25.24
100s/50s	4/9
Top score	134
Balls bowled	9,540
Wickets	231
Bowling average	24.79
5 wickets in innings	20
10 wickets in match	1
Best bowling	7/70
Catches/stumpings	44/–
- Source: CricketArchive, 23 October 2015

Michael Falcon (21 July 1888 – 27 February 1976) was a British Conservative Party politician and an amateur cricketer who played first-class cricket from 1908 to 1936.

Falcon was the son of Michael Falcon of Horstead House, Norwich and his wife Isabella (née Mordy) from Workington in Cumberland. He was educated at Harrow School and at Pembroke College, Cambridge, where he graduated B.A. and LL.B. in 1910, and was called to the bar in 1911 at the Inner Temple.

During World War I he was a captain in the Territorial Force from 1915 to 1918.

He was elected at the 1918 general election as the Member of Parliament (MP) for East Norfolk, and held the seat until his defeat at the 1923 general election.

He was mainly associated with Cambridge University Cricket Club and Marylebone Cricket Club (MCC), of which he was a member. He played Minor Counties cricket with Norfolk County Cricket Club from 1906 to 1946, and captained the team from 1912 to 1946. He made 89 appearances in first-class matches, but never played in the County Championship. In 1921 AC MacLaren said Falcon was the best fast bowler in England and regretted that he was not selected for the Ashes that summer. He played in MacLaren's England XI in August 1921 which beat the previously undefeated Australians at Eastbourne, distinguishing himself by taking 6/67 in Australia's first innings.

== Personal life ==
Falcon was married in 1930 to Kathleen Gascoigne, the daughter of Captain G. C. O. Gascoigne. They had five children, Mary, Sybil, Anne, Michael and Rachel. His brother, Harry, was also a first-class cricketer.

Parliament of the United Kingdom
Preceded by Sir Robert Price	Member of Parliament for East Norfolk; 1918 – 1923	Succeeded by Hugh Seely
