= Harry Falcon =

English cricketer

Personal information
- Full name: Joseph Henry Falcon
- Born: 9 April 1892; Horstead, Norfolk, England
- Died: 11 February 1950 (aged 57); Lowestoft, Suffolk, England
- Batting: Right-handed
- Bowling: Right-arm fast-medium
- Relatives: Michael Falcon (brother)

Domestic team information
- Years: Team
- 1911–1924: Norfolk
- 1914: Cambridge University

Career statistics
Competition	First-class
Matches	2
Runs scored	3
Batting average	–
100s/50s	–/–
Top score	3*
Balls bowled	362
Wickets	5
Bowling average	33.00
5 wickets in innings	–
10 wickets in match	–
Best bowling	3/72
Catches/stumpings	–/–
- Source: Cricinfo, 16 July 2019

Joseph Henry 'Harry' Falcon (9 April 1892 – 11 February 1950) was an English first-class cricketer.

The son of Michael Falcon and his wife, Isabella Falcon (née Mordy), he was born at Horstead House in Norfolk. He was educated at Harrow School, before going up to Pembroke College, Cambridge. While at Cambridge, he made two appearances in first-class cricket for Cambridge University against Sussex and the Marylebone Cricket Club. He took 5 wickets in his two matches, with best figures of 3 for 72. He played minor counties cricket for Norfolk before the First World War, making seven appearances in the Minor Counties Championship from 1911 to 1914.

Falcon served in the war with the 1st East Anglian Regiment, enlisting as a second lieutenant in August 1914. He was made a temporary lieutenant in May 1915, with full promotion to the rank coming in June 1916. He was made an acting captain in August 1917, while second in command of a battalion, with full promotion to the rank coming in August 1918. Following the conclusions of the war, he was made an acting major in February 1919, relinquishing the appointment in June 1919.

He resumed playing minor counties for Norfolk after the war, making an additional fourteen appearances in the Minor Counties Championship from 1920 to 1924. He died suddenly at Lowestoft in February 1950. His brother, Michael, was also a first-class cricketer.
