= Henry Negus Burroughes =

British politician

Henry Negus Burroughes (8 February 1791 – 22 March 1872) was a British Conservative Party politician. He was the eldest child of James Burkin Burroughes (1760-1803) and Christabel Burroughes (1764-1843), the daughter of Henry Negus of Hoveton Hall.

He was a Member of Parliament for East Norfolk from 1837 to 1857. Over his 20 years of being MP he made a total of 6 contributions during debates.

Burroughes was married to Jane Sarah Hoste; the couple had five children. One of their sons, Henry Negus Burroughes Jr. (born 1821), was described in A Naval Biographical Dictionary by William Richard O'Byrne. Jane died on 5 October 1851 and Henry married, secondly, Augusta Susanna Proctor in November 1854.

Parliament of the United Kingdom
Preceded by Lord Walpole; Edmond Wodehouse	Member of Parliament for East Norfolk; 1837–1857; With: Edmond Wodehouse until 1855; Sir Henry Stracey, Bt 1855–1857	Succeeded by Charles Ash Windham; Sir Edward Buxton, Bt
