= The Water Gardens, Burwood Place =

Grade II listed garden in Westminster, London, England

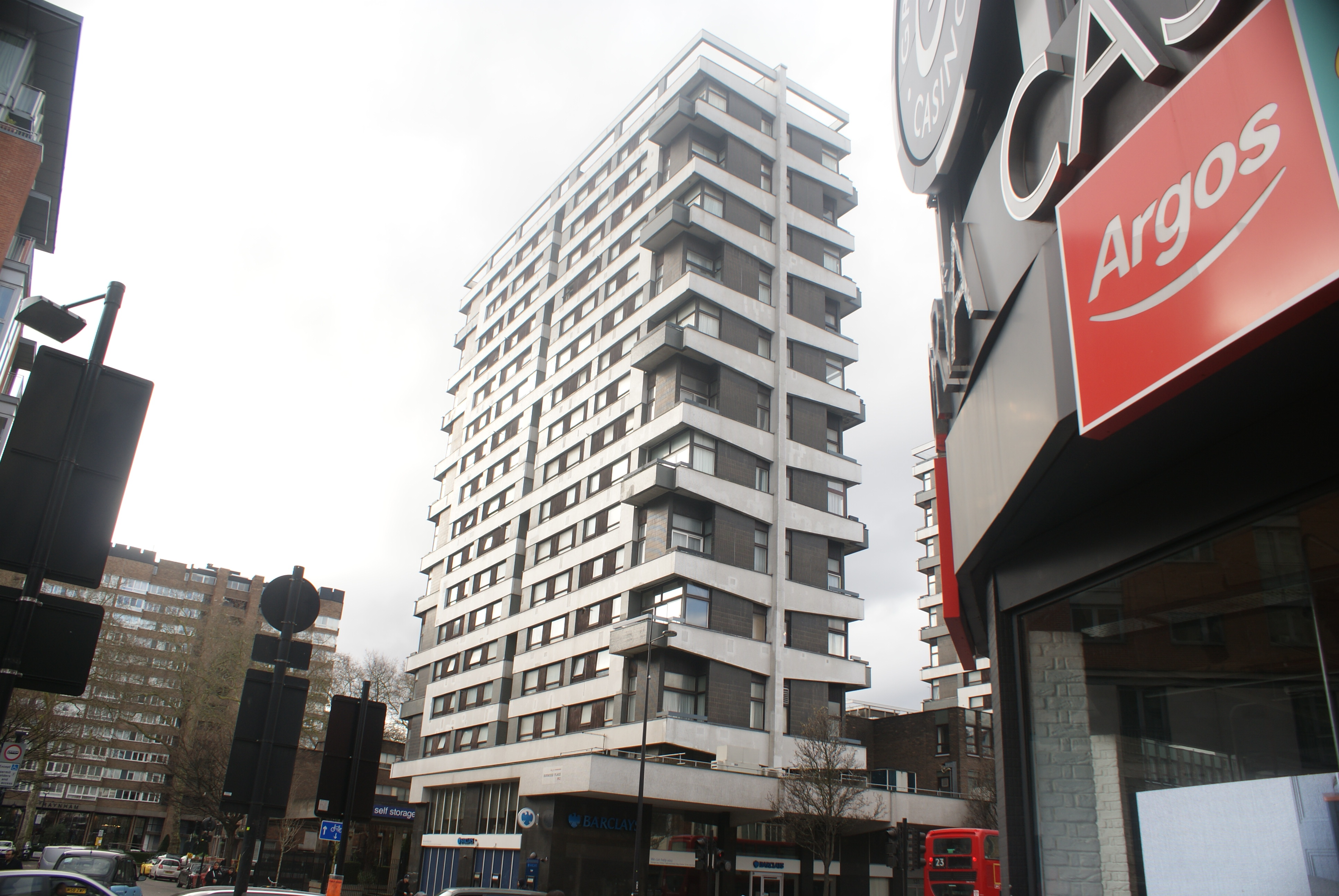
- One of the three residential towers in the complex
- Interactive map of The Water Gardens, Burwood Place
- 51.517150°N 0.167264°W
- Type: Communal gardens
- Location: Burwood Place, Edgware Road, London

History
- Built: 1961-6

Site notes
- Architect: Philip Hicks
- Architectural style: Brutalist
- Owner: Private

National Register of Historic Parks and Gardens
- Official name: The Water Gardens Designed Landscape, Burwood Place
- Designated: 18 August 2020
- Reference no.: 1466630

The Water Gardens, on Burwood Place, Edgware Road, London are a residential development comprising a communal garden and three apartment blocks. The development was planned in 1960 and constructed between 1961 and 1966. The owners of the site are the Church Commissioners, who engaged Trehearne and Norman, Preston and Partners as architects and Philip Hicks as landscape designer. The gardens were renovated in 2018 and are listed at Grade II on the Register of Historic Parks and Gardens of Special Historic Interest in England.

== History and description ==
The Water Gardens forms part of the Hyde Park Estate, the freehold of which is held by the Church Commissioners. The commission was established in 1948 and has responsibility for the management of the assets of the Church of England. The Water Gardens development was part of a masterplan for the redevelopment of the Hyde Park Estate led by Anthony Minoprio, an architect and town planner, which saw the first construction of high rise tower blocks on the estate. The Water Gardens comprises three seventeen-storey residential blocks, surrounded by communal gardens. The architects were Trehearne and Norman, Preston and Partners with Philip Hicks as landscape designer. Hicks designed a water garden with formal, rectangular pools set on podia which form the roofs of the development's underground car parks. In 2018–19, the gardens were subject to a major renovation, coinciding with the refurbishment of the car parks. The Commissioners' aim was to rejuvenate what they saw as "arguably one of the finest examples of 20th century private gardens in London". The work was undertaken by Refolo Landscape Architects and was nominated for several awards.

Bridget Cherry, in her revised London 3: North West volume in the Pevsner Buildings of England series, reissued in 2002, noted similarities between the Water Gardens development and the contemporary Barbican Estate in the City of London. However, Cherry suggested that the Water Gardens blocks were "cruder in detail [although] similarly overpowering". She was somewhat more complimentary about Hick's landscaping, describing it as "ingenious but contrived". The garden is listed at Grade II on the Register of Historic Parks and Gardens of Special Historic Interest in England.

== Sources ==
- Cherry, Bridget; Pevsner, Nikolaus (2002). London 3: North West. The Buildings of England. New Haven, US and London: Yale University Press. ISBN 978-0-300-09624-8.
- Church Commissioners, ed. (2018). The Hyde Park Estate (PDF). London: Church of England.
