= Sir Edward Buxton, 2nd Baronet =

British Liberal Party politician

Sir Edward North Buxton, 2nd Baronet (16 September 1812 – 11 June 1858) was a British Liberal Party politician.

He was the son of Sir Thomas Fowell Buxton and his wife, Hannah Gurney (1783–1872). He married Catherine Gurney (1814–1911), daughter of Samuel Gurney (1786–1856) of the Norwich Gurney family, on 12 April 1836.

He became 2nd Baronet Buxton of Bellfield and Runton on 19 February 1845, on the death of his father.

He served as Member of Parliament for Essex South from 1847 to 1852 and for East Norfolk from 1857 until his death in 1858.

He died on 11 June 1858, leaving 7 sons and 5 daughters. He was succeeded as 3rd Baronet by his eldest son, Thomas Fowell Buxton, (26 January 1837 – 28 October 1915). Another of his sons, with the same name as himself, lived 1 September 1840 – 9 January 1924 and was elected MP for Walthamstow in 1885.

Parliament of the United Kingdom
Preceded by George Palmer; Thomas William Bramston	Member of Parliament for Essex South; 1847–1852; With: Thomas William Bramston	Succeeded by Sir William Bowyer-Smijth, Bt; Thomas William Bramston
Preceded by Henry Negus Burroughes; Sir Henry Stracey, Bt	Member of Parliament for East Norfolk; 1857–1858; With: Charles Ash Windham	Succeeded by Charles Ash Windham; Hon. Wenman Coke
Baronetage of the United Kingdom
Preceded by Thomas Fowell Buxton	Baronet (Belfield); 1845–1858	Succeeded by Thomas Fowell Buxton
