= Upminster Court =

Grade II listed house in Upminster, England

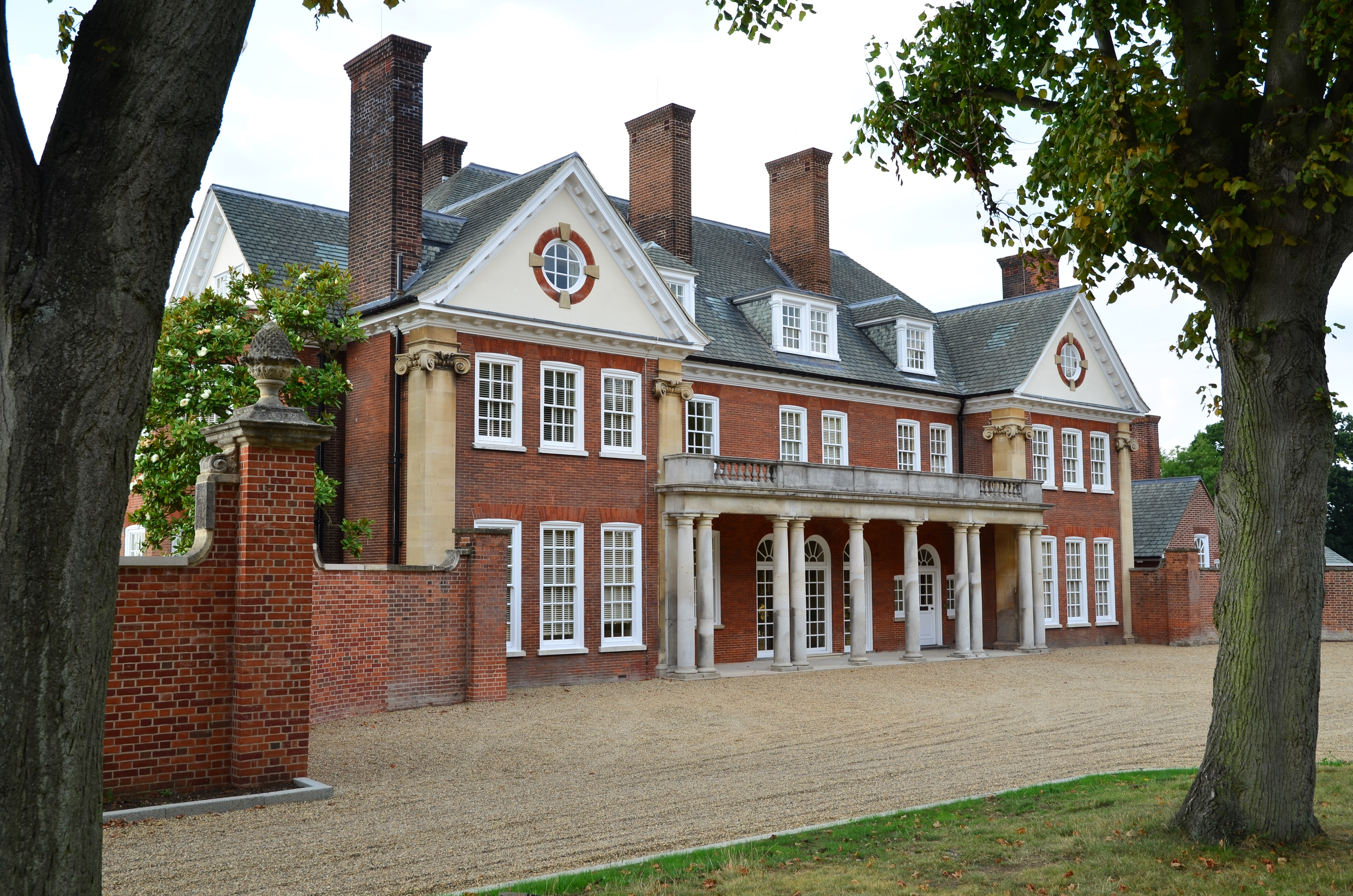
- Interactive map of Upminster Court
- 51.5687°N 0.2555°E
- Type: House
- Location: Cranham, Upminster London

History
- Built: 1906-8

Site notes
- Architect: Charles Reilly
- Architectural style: English neo-Renaissance / Wrenaissance
- Owner: Private

Listed Building – Grade II
- Official name: Upminster Court
- Designated: 14 September 1979
- Reference no.: 1079931

Listed Building – Grade II
- Official name: Entrance Piers and Gates to Upminster Court
- Designated: 14 September 1979
- Reference no.: 1079888

Listed Building – Grade II
- Official name: Stable block at Upminster Court
- Designated: 14 September 1979
- Reference no.: 1183723

National Register of Historic Parks and Gardens
- Official name: Upminster Court Gardens
- Designated: 1 May 1986
- Reference no.: 1001586

Upminster Court, on Hall Lane, Cranham, Upminster, in East London is a country house dating from the beginning of the 20th century. It was designed by Charles Reilly and built between 1906-8 for Samuel Williams, a prosperous shipping and coal merchant. After a half-century of institutional use, following the sale of the estate in the 1940s, the house was bought by a logistics company for use as their headquarters. Following the purchase, the company undertook a major restoration of the house and wider estate. The house is a Grade II listed building and its garden is recorded, also at Grade II, on the Register of Historic Parks and Gardens of Special Historic Interest in England.

== History and description ==
Samuel Williams established a profitable coal and shipping business based in London's docks at the end of the 19th century. In 1904, he bought an estate at Cranham, Upminster and employed his son Arthur to oversee the design and construction of a country house. Arthur engaged Charles Reilly as architect, plans were drawn up in 1905 and the house was built between 1906-8. (Note: The design of Upminster Court is sometimes mistakenly attributed to Charles Reilly's more famous son, Sir Charles Herbert Reilly, who followed his father as an architect but gained greater prominence as the long-serving head of the University of Liverpool School of Architecture.) The house became home to Arthur and his new wife, but remained in the family for less than 40 years. Arthur moved to Devon in the 1930s and sold the estate after his wife's death. It was then owned by a range of local authorities, until its sale to a logistics company in the early 21st century. A major restoration was undertaken at this time. The estate remains a private corporate headquarters and is not open to the public.

The house is of two storeys with attics. The construction material is red brick with Portland stone dressings. A large portico frames the front of the house, between two projecting wings. Charles O'Brien, in his revised London 5: East volume in the Pevsner Buildings of England series, reissued in 2007, describes the court as, "a handsome villa on the grand scale, in a free English Renaissance style".

Upminster Court is a Grade II listed building and its garden is recorded, also at Grade II, on the Register of Historic Parks and Gardens of Special Historic Interest in England. The entrance gates, and stable block are also listed at Grade II.

== Sources ==
- Cherry, Bridget; O'Brien, Charles; Pevsner, Nikolaus (2007). London 5: East. The Buildings of England. New Haven, US and London: Yale University Press. ISBN 978-0-300-10701-2.
