= Avenue House Grounds =

Garden in London Borough of Barnet, United Kingdom

Coordinates: 51.5975°N 0.1937°W

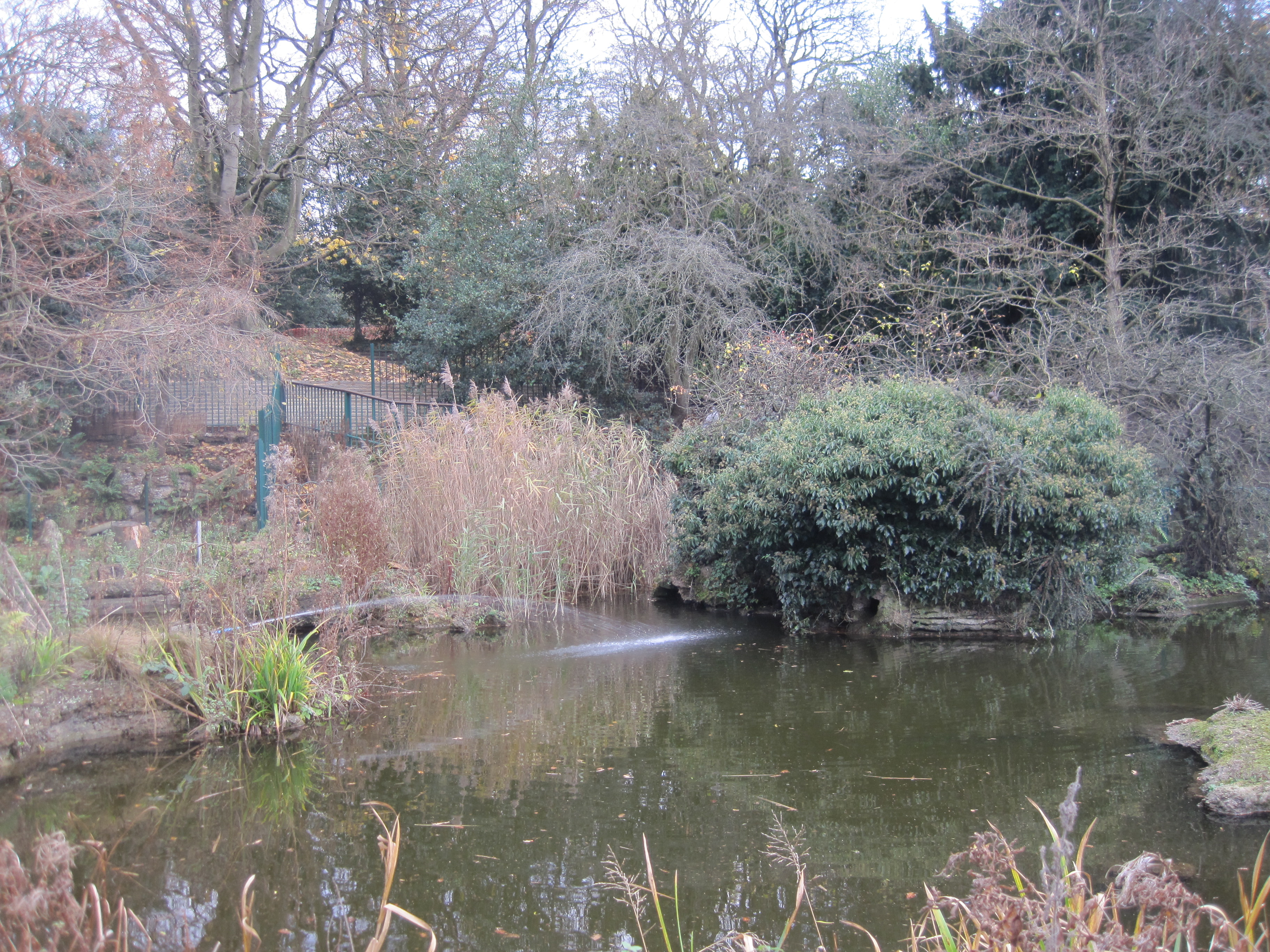
Ornamental pond

Avenue House Grounds is a ten-acre (four hectares) Site of Local Importance for Nature Conservation on East End Road in Church End, Finchley in the London Borough of Barnet. The estate is now known as Stephens House & Gardens.

Avenue House is a Grade II listed Victorian villa dating from 1859 on a site previously known as Temple Croft Fields, named after the Knights Templar, who were granted 40 acres there in 1243. From 1312 to the Dissolution of the Monasteries in 1539, it was owned by the Knights Hospitaller.

In 1874, the house and estate was acquired by ink magnate and later local MP Henry Stephens (1841–1918), who lived there with his family. He enlarged the house, added the building of a stable and employed the leading landscape gardener Robert Marnock to design the grounds, which include a walled garden and staff accommodation called The Bothy. Stephens bequeathed the house and grounds to the Finchley Urban District Council, subject to the condition that it was open for the use and enjoyment always of the public under reasonable regulation, in his will when he died in 1918, and is commemorated in a small museum, The Stephens Collection, in the visitor centre at Stephens House & Gardens.

The gardens were opened to the public in 1928. They have been set out as a public park, with lawns, trees including fine old evergreens, and shrubberies. There is also an ornamental pond with a fountain and a children's playground.

The Bothy was built in the shape of a castle sometime in the late 1870s. It is one of the earliest, if not the first, non-Roman concrete structures in England. It is a Grade II listed building . The Bothy garden is maintained by volunteers and is open to visitors monthly during the summer.

The main ecological interest is the birdlife, including great spotted woodpeckers, greenfinches, great tits and robins. Frogs breed in the pond.

Over ten years the Finchley Society led by Barbara Warren raised funds - the Spike Milligan Statue Fund - to commission a statue of former local resident Spike Milligan cast in bronze by local sculptor John Somerville and erected by the stables block in the grounds of Avenue House. The statue of Spike sitting on a bench was unveiled on 4 September 2014 at a ceremony attended by a number of local dignitaries and show-business celebrities including Roy Hudd, Michael Parkinson, Maureen Lipman, Terry Gilliam, Kathy Lette, Denis Norden and Lynsey de Paul.

== See also ==
- Nature reserves in Barnet
- Barnet parks and open spaces
