= Wenman Coke (1828–1907) =

British soldier and Liberal Member of Parliament

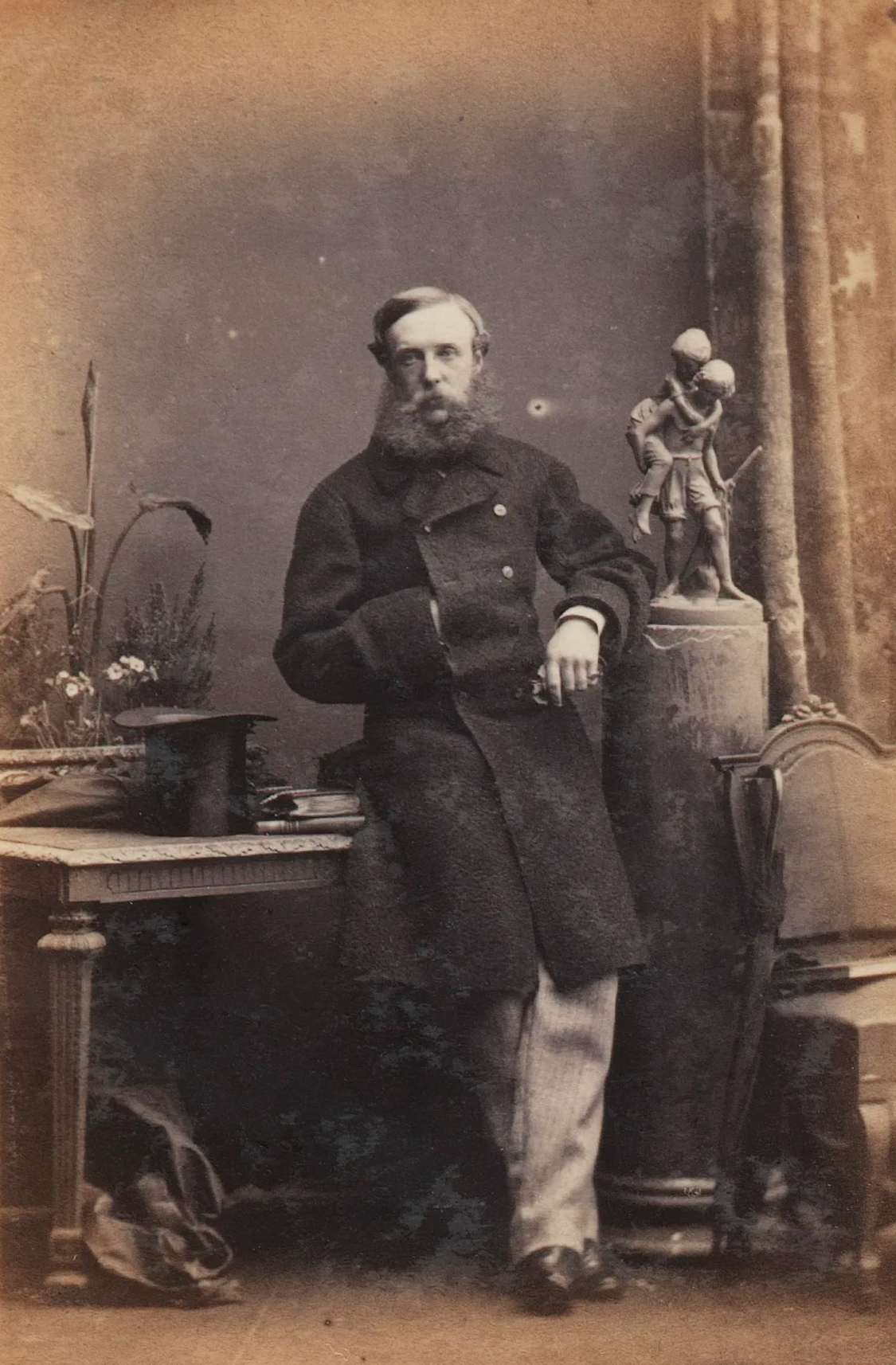
Portrait by Camille Silvy, 1861

The Hon. Wenman Clarence Walpole Coke (13 July 1828 – 10 January 1907) was a British soldier and Liberal Member of Parliament.

== Background ==
Coke was the fourth son of the agricultural reformer Thomas Coke, 1st Earl of Leicester ("Coke of Norfolk"), by his second wife Lady Anne Emilia, daughter of William Keppel, 4th Earl of Albemarle.

== Military and political career ==
Coke was a lieutenant-colonel in the Scots Guards and fought in the Crimean War. In 1858 he was returned to Parliament as one of two representatives for Norfolk East, a seat he held until 1865.

== Personal life ==
Coke made a single appearance in first-class cricket for the Marylebone Cricket Club in 1851. He died unmarried in January 1907, aged 78.

Parliament of the United Kingdom
Preceded by Charles Ash Windham; Sir Edward Buxton, Bt	Member of Parliament for Norfolk East; 1858–1865; With: Charles Ash Windham 1858–1859; Edward Howes 1859–1865	Succeeded by Edward Howes; Clare Sewell Read
