= Springfield Park (London) =

Park in Upper Clapton in the London Borough of Hackney

Coordinates: 51.571°N 0.058°W

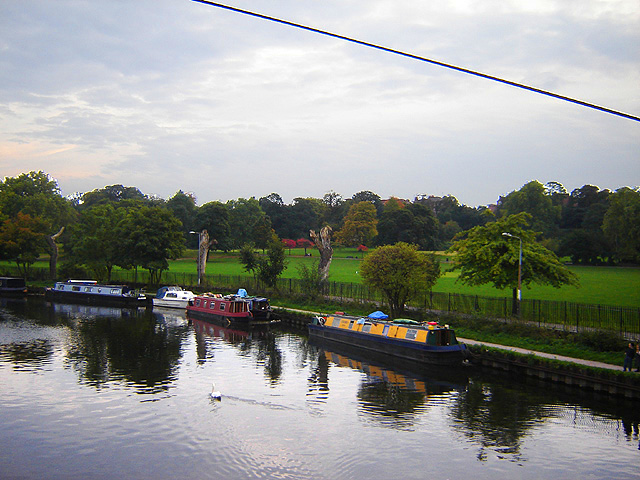
Springfield Park from the High (pedestrian) bridge over the Lea. (October 2005)

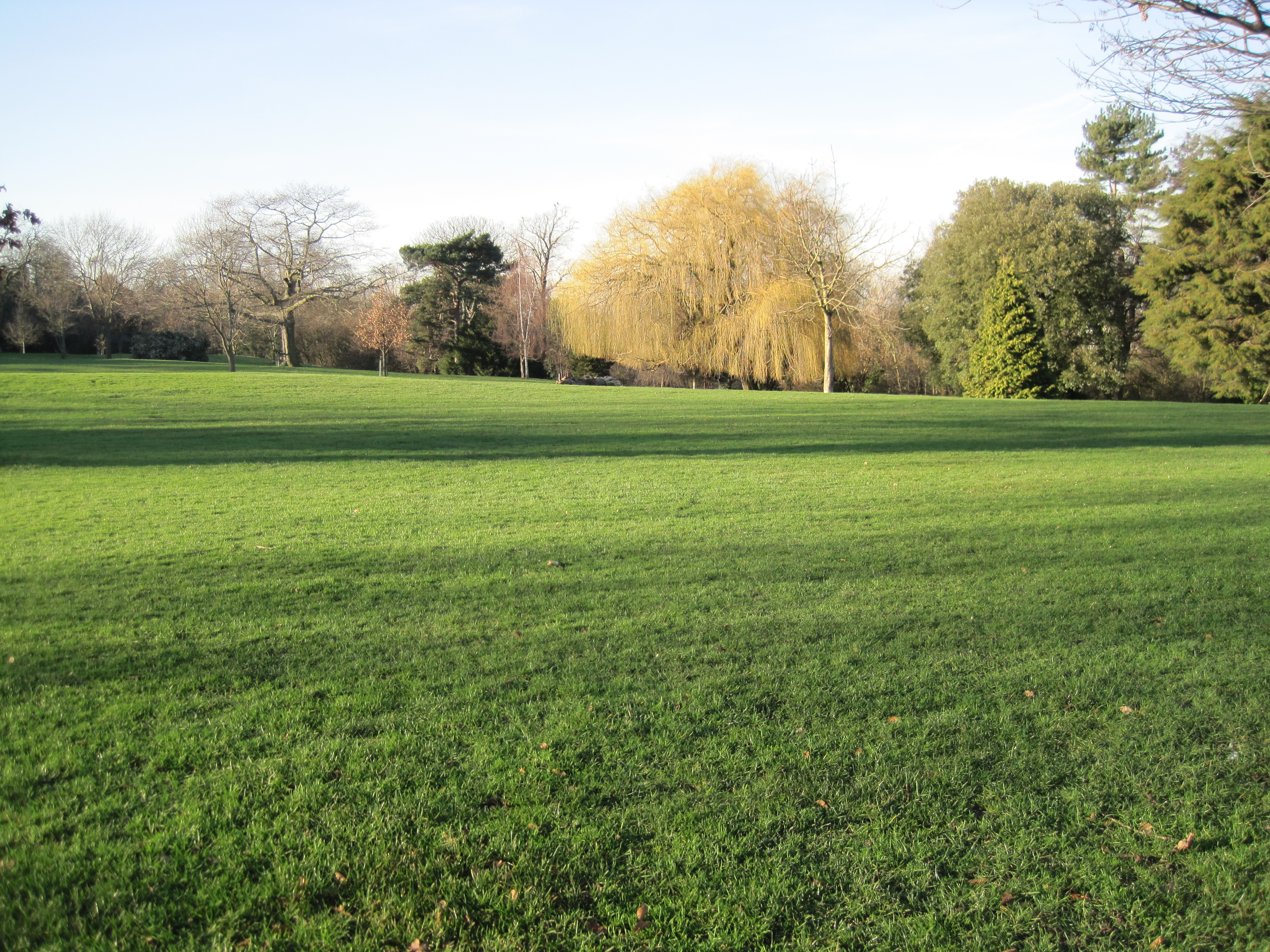
Springfield Park

Springfield Park is a park in Upper Clapton in the London Borough of Hackney.

Spring Hill Recreation Ground, immediately to the north of the park, is an additional amenity. The Recreation Ground is also managed by the local authority and together they comprise a continuous public open space.

Springfield Park was formed in 1905 from the grounds of three private houses, one of which still survives as a cafe. It is a local nature reserve.

== Topography and environs ==
The park occupies 14.73 hectares (36.4 acres) and slopes from the high ground on the edge of Stamford Hill to the towpath of the River Lee Navigation on the River Lea. Situated on the other side of the river/navigation to the park is Springfield Marina, a large basin for narrow boats. The park is also adjacent to the Lea Rowing Club and Spring Hill Recreation Ground, which is used by Hackney Rugby Club. The higher ground of the park affords views over Walthamstow Marshes to Walthamstow and Epping Forest.

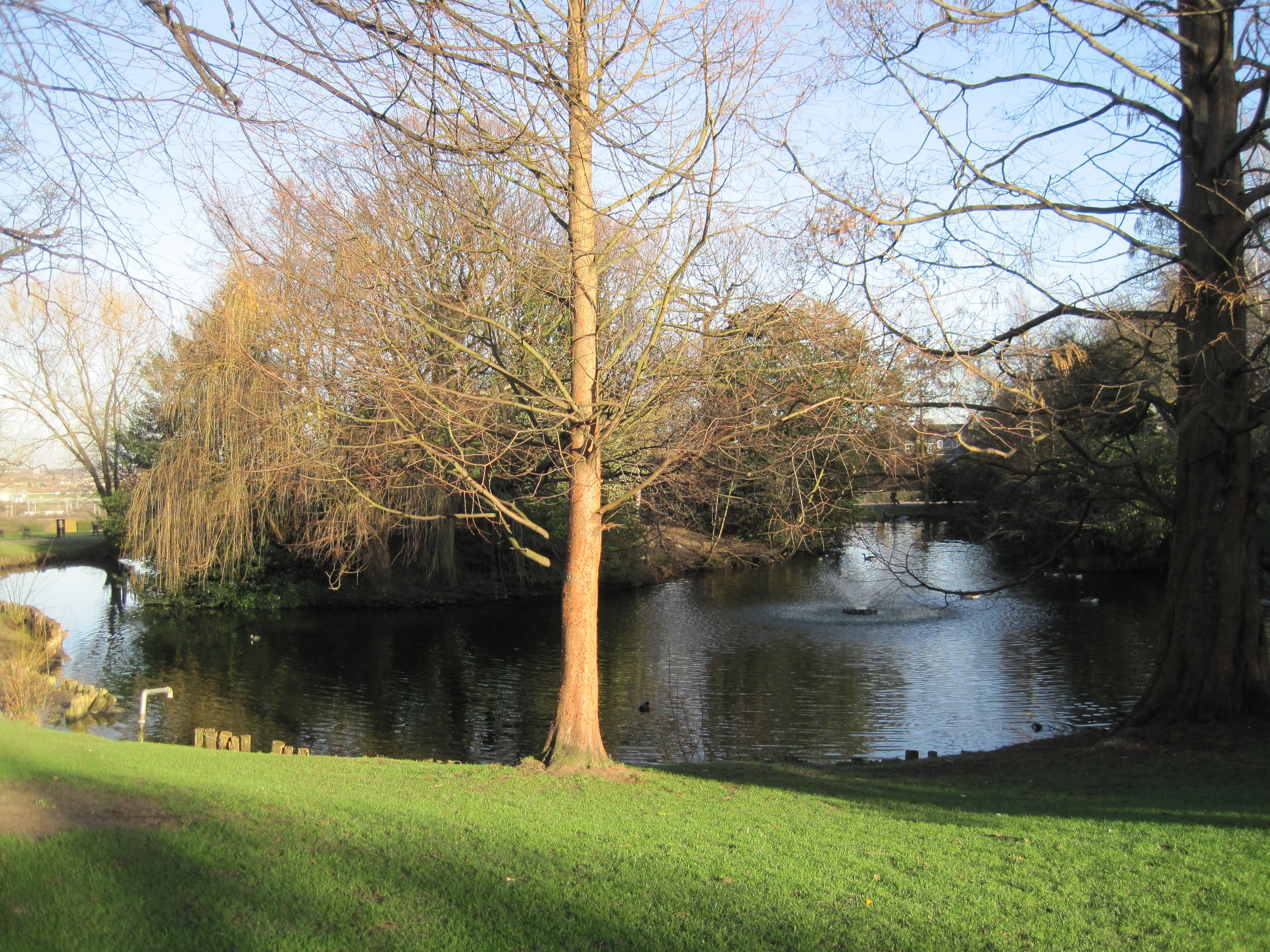
Lake in Springfield Park

== History ==
The Georgian era Springfield House stands near the main entrance to the park on a road known simply as Springfield. It was a private residence well before the surroundings were given over to housing in the mid-Victorian period. The park area remained intact as a private estate until 1902 when the house and land went up for sale. A group of local businessmen saved the park when it went up for auction and eventually the London County Council took over responsibility for the park and it opened to the public on 5 August 1905.

Roman sarcophagi were found during building and landscaping work in the nineteenth century at the park along with pottery and other burials. The Hackney Boat, being the remains of a late Saxon logboat were found close by in 1987. The original boat and replica are on display in Hackney Museum.

As well as Springfield House, there were two other large houses on the estate, 'Springhill House' and 'The Chestnuts'. They had to be demolished due to their deteriorating condition when the council took them over. A road called Spring Lane ran through the estate but this was re-routed along the Lee and now forms part of the tow-path walk.

The area now occupied by the park formerly included a feature known as 'Giles Dock' which may have been associated with nearby tile yards. This facility is visible on an Estate Map of 1774, still present in the 1868 Ordnance Survey map but had been filled in by 1896 - possibly as part of the 1876 works to straighten the river in this area.

== Facilities ==
Sports facilities include five tennis courts, a bowling green and grounds for rugby, cricket and other sports on the wide flat area by the river. The park is home to Hackney Rugby Club, and planning has begun on a replacement for the rugby side's clubhouse, which was burnt down in April 1999. The Spark Cafe is housed in Springfield House, now known locally as the White House Mansion. Near the house is a large conservatory which was open to the public but has since been closed. There is a large pond and ornamental gardens with fountains and a children's playground as well as a bandstand.

The Springfield Park Restoration Project aims to restore and improve many aspects of the park, with work due to start in summer 2019.

The Capital Ring, a 121-kilometre (75 mi) circular walking route around London, passes through the park on the section from Stoke Newington to Hackney Wick, and the distinctive green signs can be seen in the park. Another walking route, the Lea Valley Walk, is close by and can be accessed via the River Lee towpath.

The park received a Green Flag award in July 2008.

== Springfield Park community orchard ==
The small community orchard contains varieties of local apple trees, including examples rescued from Hackney gardens. There is also a medlar tree and an olive tree.
