= Royal Borough of Kensington and Chelsea Cemetery, Hanwell =

Cemetery in Hanwell, London, England

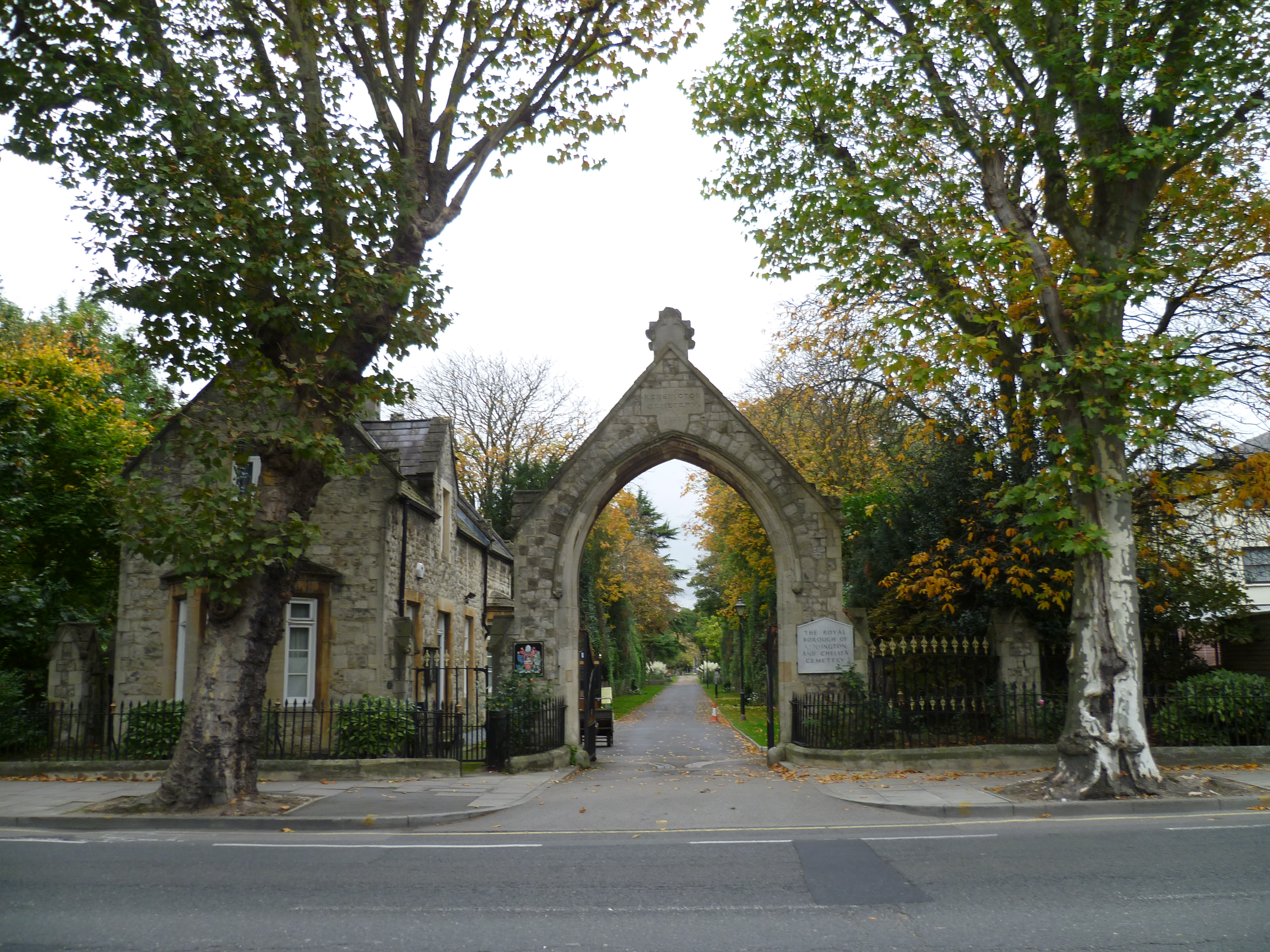
- Main entrance to the cemetery
- Interactive map of Royal Borough of Kensington and Chelsea Cemetery, Hanwell

Details
- Established: 1855
- Location: 31 Uxbridge Road, Hanwell London W7 3PX
- Country: England
- Coordinates: 51°30′40.85″N 0°19′54.29″W
- Type: Public
- Owned by: Royal Borough of Kensington and Chelsea
- Size: 7.7 hectares (19 acres)
- Website: Official website

Royal Borough of Kensington and Chelsea Cemetery, Hanwell (aka Hanwell Cemetery) is located on the north side of the Uxbridge Road in Hanwell, London, England. The cemetery was opened in 1855 to take the pressure off the burial grounds in St Mary Abbots parish in North Kensington. The Burial Act 1857 also mandated that new interments were to be carried out beyond the densely populated areas of London. The cemetery is designed in the Victorian style for parks, intricately landscaped with many curving paths. The cemetery is owned and operated today by the Royal Borough of Kensington and Chelsea.

== History ==
Although located in the London Borough of Ealing, this extramural cemetery was created and opened in 1855 by the St Mary Abbots parish in North Kensington, with the assistance of the Hanwell Urban District Council. This was to take the pressure off St Mary's own burial grounds which were almost full. Moreover, burials within the capital were now looked upon as a potential health problem and so the Burial Act 1857 was passed. One of the provisions was for new interments to be carried out beyond the densely populated areas of London.

It lies on the east side of Hanwell's boundary with West Ealing and the old boundary stones can still be seen along the ground's eastern perimeter.

In common with the Victorian style for parks, it is intricately landscaped with many curving paths. A variety of trees including yew, pine and oak are spread throughout the grounds with tall cedars around the perimeter help to create a more interesting vista than would an open and repeating grid system of graves. The entrance from the Uxbridge Road is through a tall stone arch with heavy iron gates and past a lodge. A long avenue of tall evergreen yew, holly and box hedging, leads to the burial area and the chapel which is situated towards the centre. The chapel (which is now disused and in disrepair), lodge and arch, are built of Kentish Ragstone in the Revived Gothic style. All three were designed by Thomas Allom whose name appears inscribed atop the arch. He himself is buried in Kensal Green Cemetery.

It was then taken over by the then Metropolitan Borough of Kensington and they opened another cemetery, nearby at Acton in 1926. It is now owned by the Royal Borough of Kensington and Chelsea.

== Ecology ==
Before the Inclosure Acts, this ground was the deep, rich, common land, known as East Field. The land is drained by a very small brook which rises from a spring in nearby Milton Road just to the north. This flows unseen now, through a culvert that runs under the grounds towards the Uxbridge Road in the south. Its distance from main roads, the shelter given by the trees and general lack of busy activity, makes this a very peaceful place. It is no wonder therefore, that the cemetery has become something of a sanctuary for wild birds. The London Borough of Ealing views it as part of a conservation corridor with that of its neighbouring cemetery the Westminster City Cemetery, Hanwell on the opposite side of the Uxbridge Road.

== Notable interments ==
- Sir Arthur Benn (1858–1937), British politician and businessman
- John Conolly (1794–1866) Pioneering psychiatrist and superintendent of the Hanwell Asylum. He was buried here when it was still permitted for local residents to also be interred in these ground.
- Marta Cunningham (1869–1937), founder of the Not Forgotten Association in 1921 to support ex-servicemen from the Great War which is still running today.
- James Charles Inglis (1851–1911) who was a British civil engineer. It is a very tall memorial, which also features his likeness in carved relief in the style of a medallion.
- Sir Francis McClintock (1819–1907), Irish Arctic explorer who led the 1857–59 expedition that confirmed the fate of Sir John Franklin.
- General Sir Charles Reid (1818–1901) East India Company officer.
- Edgar Albert Smith (1847–1916), conchologist.
- Sir Charles Ash Windham (1810–1870) – "Hero of the Redan".

== Gallery ==
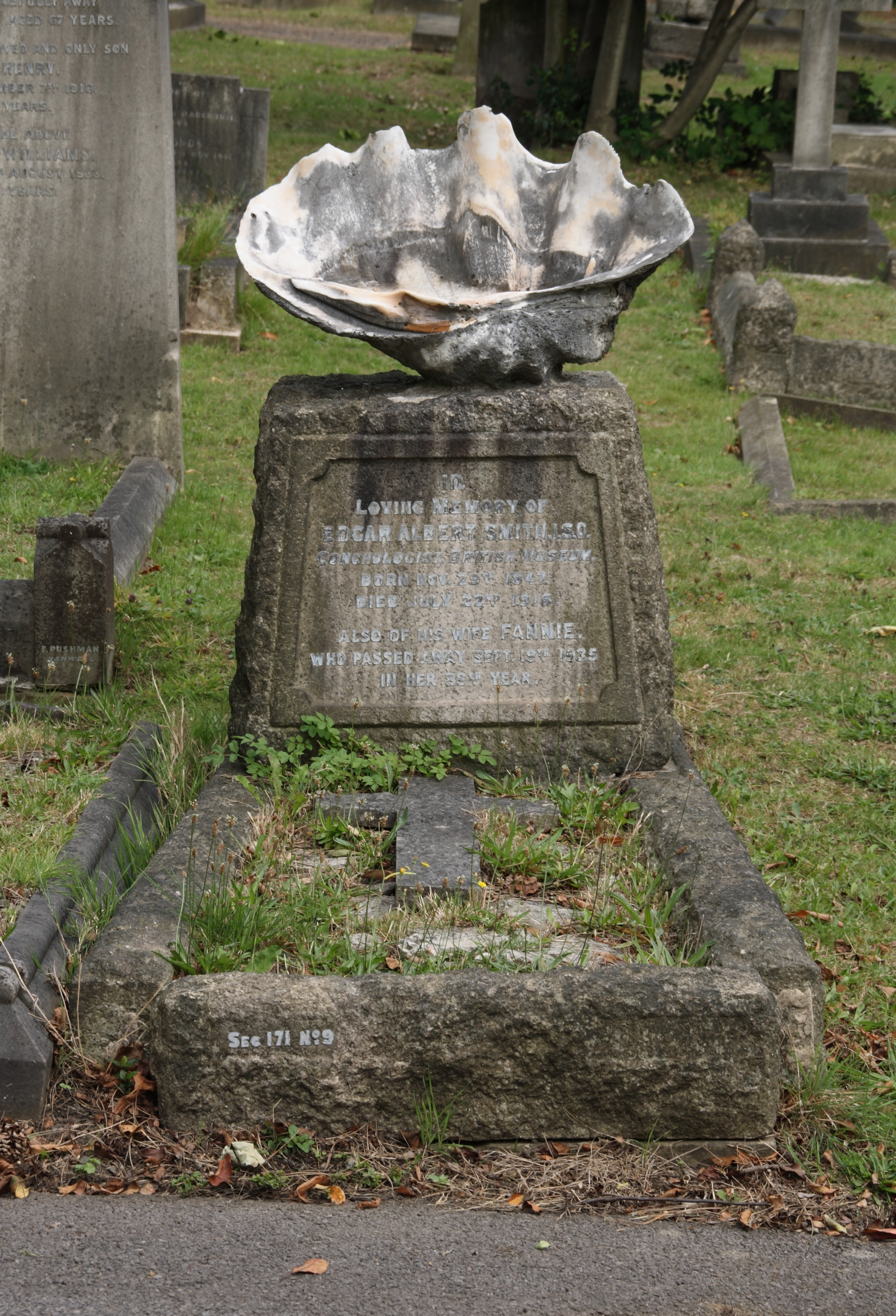
Edgar Albert Smith (1847–1916), British zoologist.

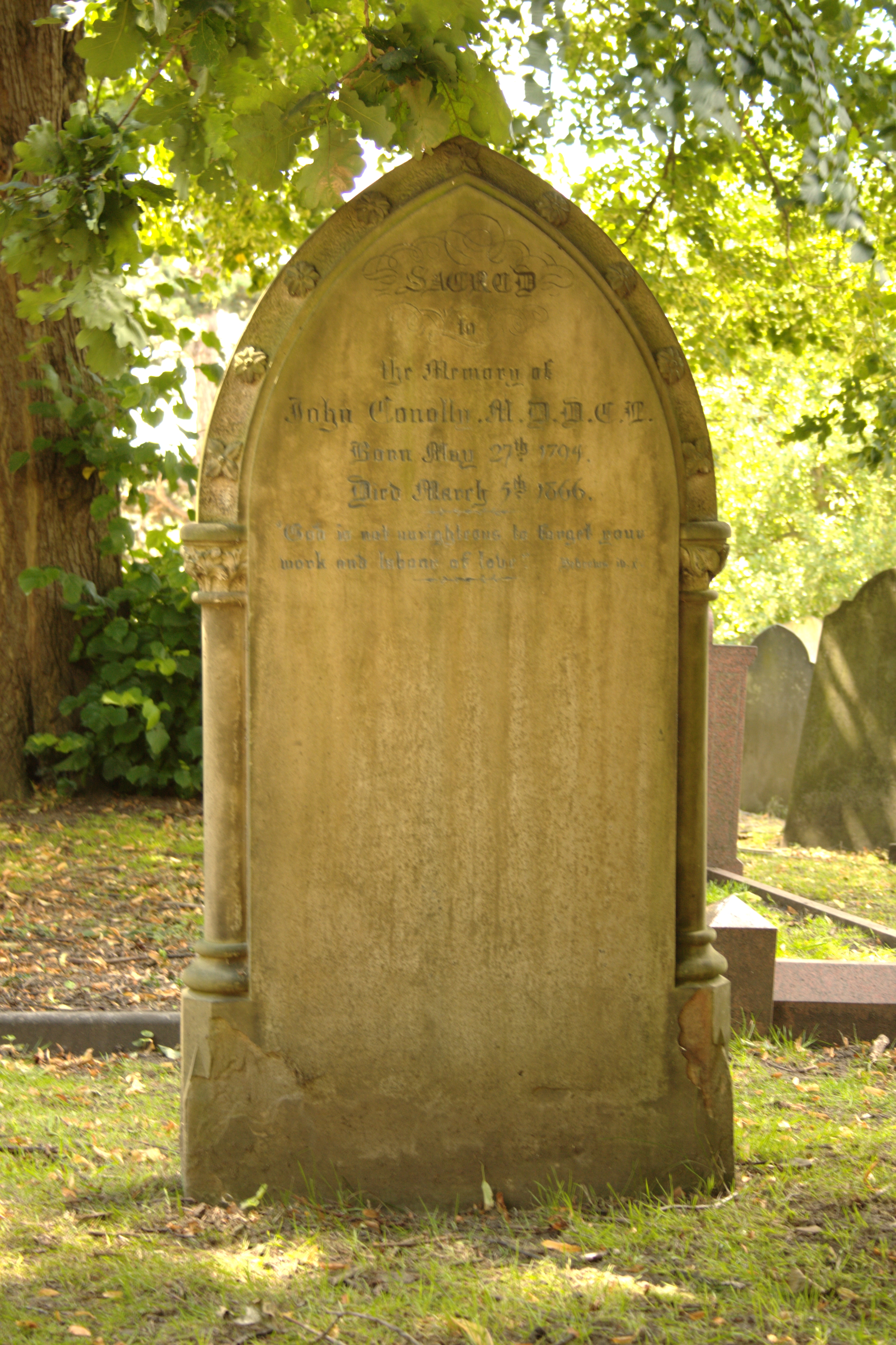
John Conolly (1794–1866), pioneering psychiatrist.

Also buried at the cemetery are 65 Commonwealth service personnel of both World Wars, many buried in a war graves plot with CWGC headstones. A Screen Wall memorial lists those buried in graves that could not be marked by headstones.
