= Church End, Finchley =

Locality in London, England

Coordinates: 51.6021°N 0.1927°W

Church End
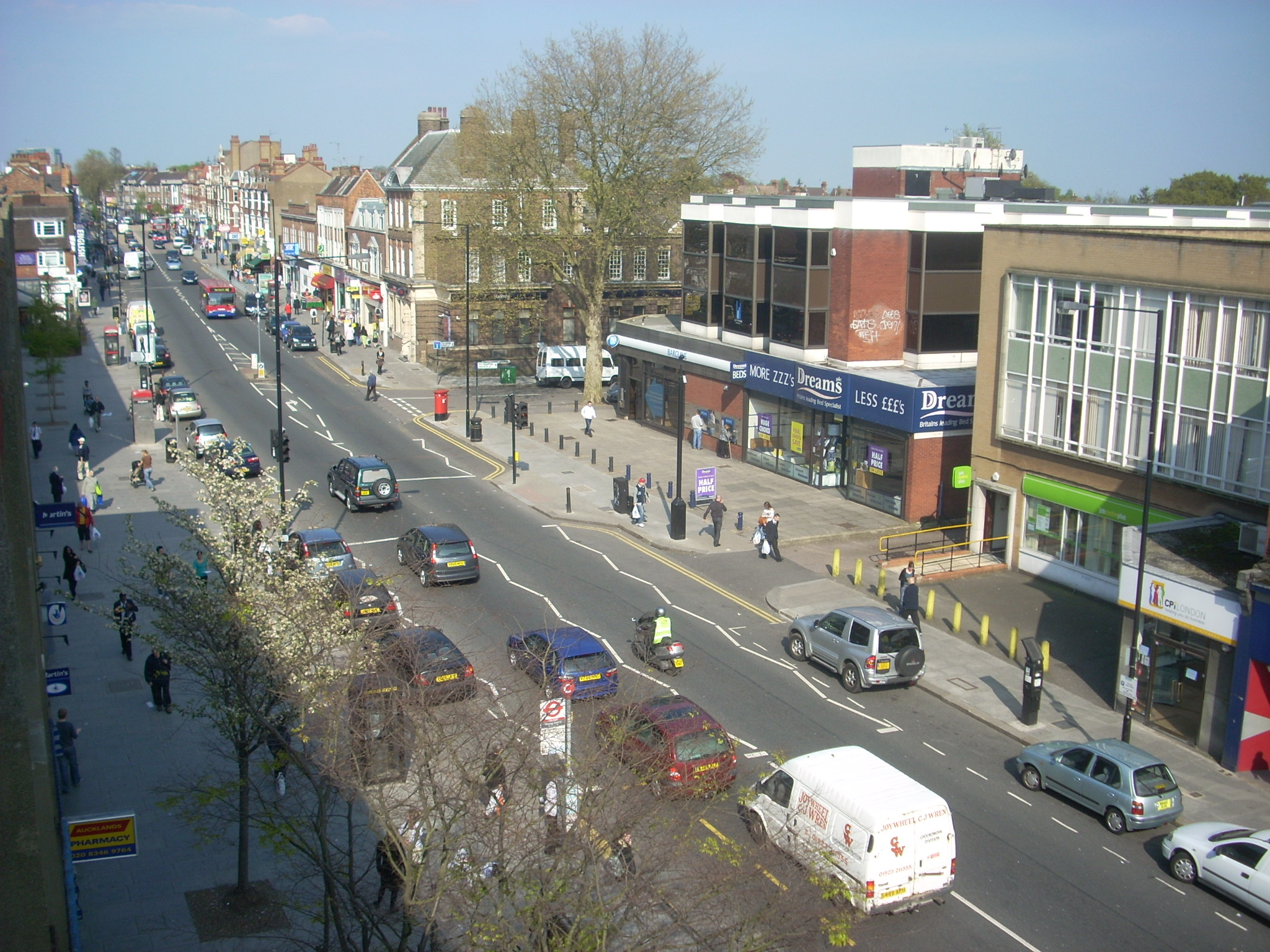
- Ballards Lane

- Location within Greater London
- Population: 15,715 (2011 Census. Finchley Church End ward)
- OS grid reference: TQ255905
  - Charing Cross: 7 mi (11.3 km) SSE
- London borough: Barnet
- Ceremonial county: Greater London
- Region: London
- Country: England
- Sovereign state: United Kingdom
- Post town: LONDON
- Postcode district: N3
- Dialling code: 020
- Police: Metropolitan
- Fire: London
- Ambulance: London
- UK Parliament: Finchley and Golders Green
- London Assembly: Barnet and Camden

Church End (often known as Finchley Central) is a locality within Finchley in the London Borough of Barnet in London, England. Aside from its church it centres on Finchley Central Underground station. Church End is an old village, now a suburban development, centred 7 miles (11 km) north-northwest of Charing Cross.

== Toponymy ==
Church End was named in 1683. The name, which refers to the parish church of Finchley, St Mary, is formed from Middle English 'churche' and 'ende' and means 'district by the church'. The name Finchley Church End is a ward in Barnet.

== Geography ==
The main road runs on a south–north axis, and is called Regents Park Road (previously Ducksetters Lane) from the North Circular Road until it reaches the road bridge at Finchley Central station (Northern line), where the name changes to Ballards Lane. Its heart is the ancient district around St Mary's Church, where the imposing brick tower of Pardes House Primary School (formerly Christ's College Finchley) is a landmark.

== Amenities ==
There is a public library in Regents Park Road in Gateway House, a new building facing the junction with Hendon Lane. The library was relocated in September 2017 from its former home in Hendon Lane, next to the church. To the north, along Regents Park Road and Ballards Lane, close to the station, is a retail district with a Victorian and Edwardian shopping parade as well as a couple of pubs and modern shops including Sainsbury's and Tesco.

Further north, Victoria Park is the home of the Finchley Carnival, a large fun fair held every year in July, dating back to 1905. Victoria Park has a lawn bowls and croquet club with a modern clubhouse.

To the southeast along East End Road are two institutions of note: Avenue House, built in 1859 and home to the Finchley Society, and a Jewish cultural centre, the Sternberg Centre. Avenue House was the home of Henry "Inky" Stephens, (1841–1918), a former local MP, who left Avenue House to "the people of Finchley" on his death in 1918. The house and ten acres of fine landscaped gardens and parkland open to the public are now run by a local charitable trust. In February 2014 the estate was relaunched and rebranded, in conjunction with a Heritage Lottery Fund bid, as Stephens House and Gardens. "Inky" Stephens was the son of Dr Henry Stephens (1796–1864), who founded the Stephens Ink Company, the first producers of "Blue-Black Writing Fluid" in 1832. A small museum, The Stephens Collection, commemorates this invention and the Stephens family, along with the history of writing materials including many photographs and artefacts. In 2016 the museum closed temporarily in order to move to a new location within the estate's new Visitor Centre established within the former stables block.

South, along Regents Park Road, is College Farm, the last farm in Finchley (entrance in Fitzalan Road), and a statue, referred to locally as "The Naked Lady", but more properly named La Délivrance.

== History ==
=== Hendon Lane and the Church ===
West ward of Finchley Urban District in the 1930s.

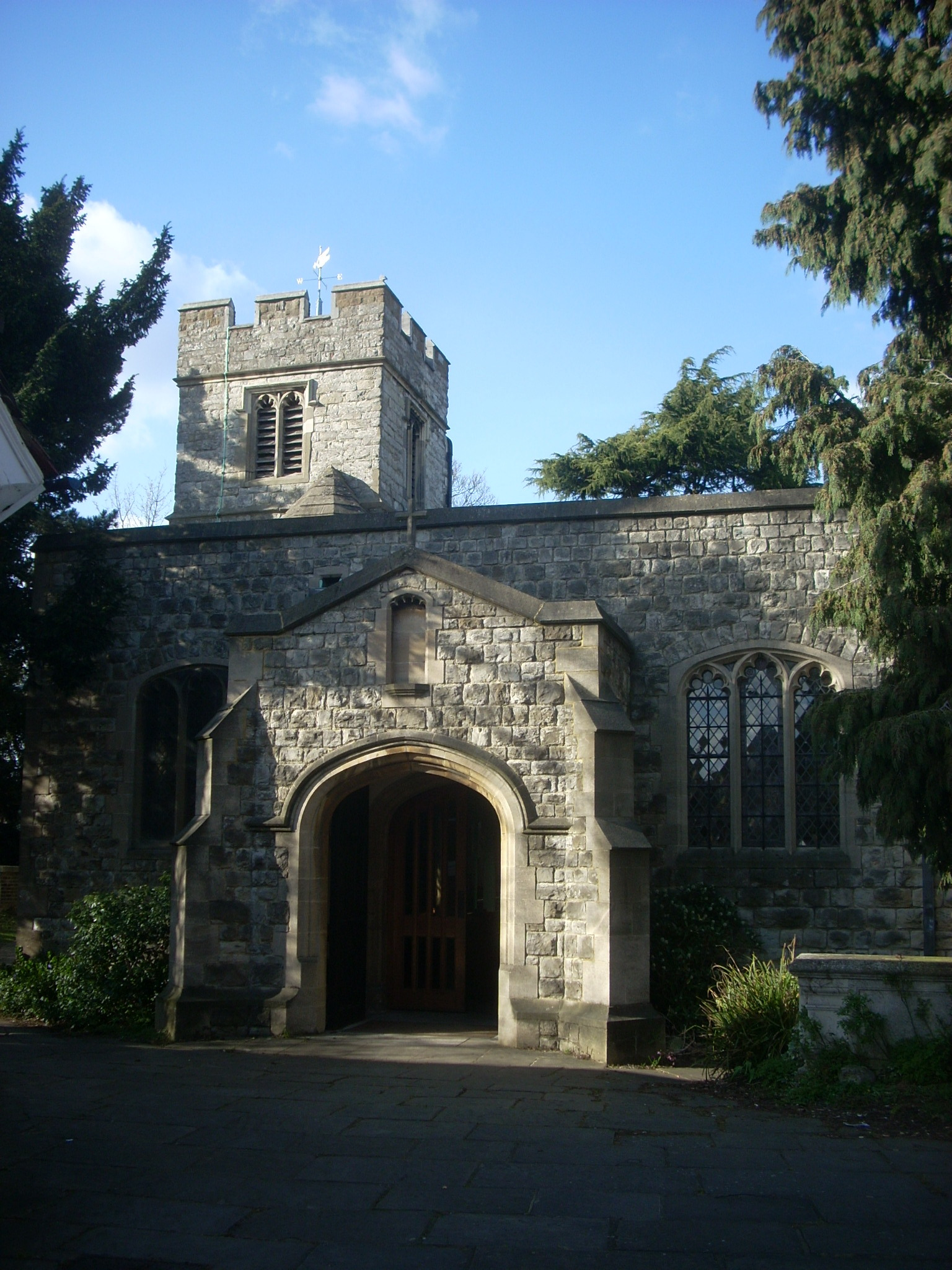
The entrance to St Mary's church

Finchley's oldest church, St Mary-at-Finchley, was established sometime in the 12th century, early documents mention it from the 1270s, and by 1356 it was dedicated to St Mary.

The building has been altered many times since its foundation and the oldest parts, the north wall and the tower (which seems to have had a steeple during the 16th and 17th centuries), date from the reign of Henry VII. The organ, which dates from 1878, was from Henry Willis & Sons, the famous organ builders. In the churchyard are the graves of Thomas Payne, the radical and bookseller, and Major John Cartwright the political reformer.

Next to the church in Hendon Lane stood the Old Queen’s Head, which took its name from Queen Anne, and was owned by the Finchley Charities. In 1833 the original inn burned down and was rebuilt, surviving until the lease on the house came up in 1857. The rector of Finchley, Thomas Reader White, refused to renew the lease on the house and the inn did not move to its present location as the New Queen’s Head, in East End Road until the 1860s. White renamed the buildings Finchley Hall and used it to house a school of the same name which later became Christ's College Finchley. In 1902 Finchley Council took over the hall for offices but bomb damage (1940) made the building unsafe and they were demolished shortly after. Church End Library (1960) occupied the site to about 2015.

From 1787 to 1880 a cage for criminals stood between the Church and the Old Queen’s Head. The Anglican community established a National school in 1813 which was rebuilt as St Mary's School in 1852. In 1990 the school was re-established near to the brook at Dollis Park and now only the infants' section, built in 1902, remains on the original location. The site of the main school building is now occupied by Barnet Civil and Family Courts Centre, which opened in 1993. It was announced in 2014 that the adjacent former infants' section building, having survived a threat of demolition, would enjoy a change of use and become a synagogue.

Finchley's old rectory, first mentioned in 1476, also stood near the church and in 1810 was chiefly built of timber, with roofs of slate and tiles. Ralph Worsley, rector 1794–1848, went to live at Moss Hall in Nether Street, which his wife had inherited, whereupon the rectory house was leased. One of the first actions of Thomas Reader White, rector 1848–77, was to replace the old house with one to the north, built in stock brick to the design of Anthony Salvin. In 1974 a smaller rectory was built to the west and the Victorian one was demolished. During the English Civil War, the church's old Norman font was buried in the rectory garden; it was rediscovered in Victorian times and now stands in the church.

In 1888 Finchley Council established a voluntary fire brigade in Hendon Lane near the top of Gravel Hill which remained at this location until 1933 (see Long Lane). In 1904 Finchley obtained the first motorised fire engine in Great Britain (see picture and article). Gravel Hill gets its name from the gravel pits which dotted the area in the eighteenth and nineteenth centuries. At the top of Gravel Hill a house, now converted into apartments, stands on the site of the old village pond, which was filled in around 1900.

Close by is Finchley Garden Village which was developed around a green in 1910 as a small garden suburb. At the bottom of Hendon Lane is a lane curiously named Crooked Usage. Originally a part of Hendon Lane, its picturesque name dates from the straightening of Hendon Lane in 1911–12.

=== Regents Park Road and Ballards Lane ===
Until the 1820s the only route north from Temple Fortune to Finchley was along a road called Ducksetters Lane (known as such by 1475). This ran close to the present Regents Park Road, and terminated where the junction with Gravel Hill is today. The road then passed along the very top part of Hendon Lane, before continuing north as Ballards Lane (known as such since 1424). There had been a number of larger houses in Ballards Lane since the 15th century of which only the 18th-century Cornwall House in Cornwall Avenue, now remains.

The King of Prussia public house was a licensed property by the middle of the 18th century and may have originally been the King’s Head. It was substantially rebuilt in the 1960s and was later called The Dignity. The pub closed in October 2016 and was replaced by a chicken restaurant. In June 2019, after a largely local campaign, the restaurant closed and was turned into a pub again, retaking the name The King of Prussia. It occupies the ground floor of a six-storey block containing offices and the Travelodge Finchley.

In 1826 an Act of Parliament meant the construction of a new turnpike road between Marylebone and North Finchley which, in Church End, is now called Regents Park Road and replaced Ducksetters Lane. The people of Finchley continued to use the old lane as the tollgate, situated in Ballards Lane at the junction of Nether Street, meant that parishioners had to pay to use their main thoroughfare. After much protest the gate was moved to just south of the junction of East End Road and was shortly afterwards removed. It was commemorated with a blue plaque put up at the Queen’s Head by the Finchley Society, but the pub closed in 2012 and is now apartments.

In the late 1830s or early 1840s Peter Kay established a garden nursery on the site now occupied by Tesco on Ballards Lane, which closed in 1889 (see also Long Lane), and in 1874 William Clements started a nursery on a triangular plot at the junction of Regents Park Road and Hendon Lane. Ford Madox Brown lived at 1 Grove Villas on Regents Park Road between 1853 and 1855 where he painted a number of agricultural scenes and, most notably, "The Last of England".

In 1867 Finchley and Hendon station was opened by the Edgware, Highgate and London Railway which became later Finchley (Church End) station and finally, in 1940, Finchley Central station. The establishment of a railway and the removal of the tollgates enabled the development of residential streets and a row of shops, Albert Terrace and The Railway Hotel. This was demolished in 1962 and replaced with an office block.

The area was still a village until news of a possible tramline between Golders Green and North Finchley encouraged suburban development. From the railway station north as far as Long Lane parades of shops were built from 1893 onwards, and were well established when in 1909 the trams were introduced. In 1911 King Edward's Hall replaced Clements' nursery and was used as a hospital during World War I.

The Alcazar Cinema (1913) between Princes Avenue and Redbourne Avenue was renamed the Bohemia in 1915 and during the 1920s relocated south to where Gateway House was later built. Gateway House was demolished at the end of 2015 and the site has been redeveloped, now containing a new public library and a small supermarket, with five floors of apartments above.

At the northern end of the shopping area is Finchley Police Station, which closed in 2012 and in 2019 still awaits redevelopment. There had been a police station in Finchley from 1873 but the present location dates from 1886 when Wentworth Lodge in Ballards Lane was bought. The old police station continued from 1889 until 1965 when it was rebuilt.

Across the road from the police station is Victoria Park (approx 18 acres). Opened in 1902, it was intended to mark Queen Victoria's Diamond Jubilee and was Finchley's first public park. It contains a playground, tennis courts, a cafe and a lawn bowls and croquet club with two greens. From 1905 Victoria Park was the location of the Finchley Carnival.

=== Finchley Manor and surrounding district ===
Wards of Finchley Municipal Borough in the 1950s.

Running west to east from Church End to East Finchley is East End Road. This was possibly Piryton Lane (known in 1423). Midway along this road is the manor house for the Bibbesworth estate, Finchley's principal manor house. Bibbesworth was a sub-manor which had been born from an earlier estate owned by a family styling itself the Finchleys during the 13th century (although whether the area takes its name from the family or the other way round has never been entirely clear). By 1319 it was being called a manor.

Richard Rook had a court in 1364 and these court leets and baron continued until the last was held in 1936. There was certainly a manor house by 1253 but this burnt down and was replaced during the 15th and 16th centuries. Of the original building only a ditch, possibly a moat, remains. The only Lord of note is William Hastings, Lord Hastings (d. 1483), whose family held the manor until 1527. From 1622 until 1830 the manor was controlled by the descendants of Edward Allen, a London merchant.

The last to hold the manor was Edward Cooper Arden and the last court was held in 1936. The manor house seen today, now the Sternberg Centre, was built in 1723 by the Allens. The house was used as a boys' school between 1819 and 1857. Between 1863 and 1882 it was the residence of George Plucknett, a magistrate, who used the main hall to hear cases. Between 1921 and 1981 the order of Ste Marie Auxiliatrice used the building as a girls' school.

Until the beginning of the 20th century a curious oblong pond with a central island existed opposite the manor and was known locally as the "moat"; however these are more likely to have been fish ponds or openings created by the extraction of clay for making bricks for the building of the 16th-century building. The lane known as The Avenue, which runs behind Avenue House, is derived from a line of trees planted by Elizabeth King whose husband was lord of the manor in the 1600s. Built in 1859, Avenue House and ten acres of grounds were bought in 1874 by the ink manufacturer, philanthropist and later MP Henry 'Inky' Stephens and left on his death to the people of Finchley in 1918, the grounds later becoming a public park. The estate is now (2014) known as Stephens House and Gardens.

East of the manor house was Manor Farm where details of the calf and the cart in Dante Gabriel Rossetti's painting "Found" was painted. Finchley Cricket Club and a Pure Gym now occupy the site.

=== Long Lane ===
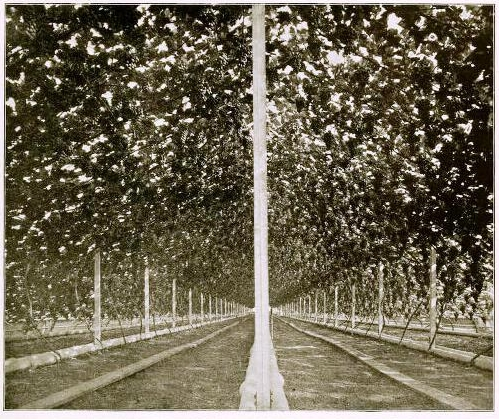
Greenhouse with 10,000 bunches of Black Alicante grapes, Claigmar Vineyard, c.1894. According to Peter Edmund Kay, the photograph was taken at the request of the gardener to the Prince of Wales, the future King Edward VII, "who desired the Prince to see what he considered the finest house of grapes ever grown. Mr Craig said 'I consider this as great an achievement in horticulture as Westminster Abbey is in architecture'".

Another road running from Church End to East Finchley is Long Lane (known as such by 1719) which may have been known in medieval times as Ferrours Lane. Roughly halfway along its route at a crossroads is Squires Lane which runs from the manor house to the High Road, the traditional division between East Finchley and Church End. Behind the large houses which fronted the west side of Ballards Lane, Squires Lane and Long Lane, was Claigmar Vineyard, started in 1872 by Peter Kay's son, Peter Edmund Kay. By the early 1900s Kay was producing 100 tons each of grapes and tomatoes and 20,000 dozens of cucumbers a year in greenhouses with a total length of five and a quarter miles.

In 1903 Finchley Electric Light Company opened a generating station on the vineyard site which was purchased by the Finchley Council two years later and later still, in 1955, by the Eastern Electricity Board. Sir Charles Redvers Westlake, who was engineer at the works between 1935 and 1948, was later responsible for the building of the Owen Falls dam, Uganda. The site is now the headquarters of the Pentland Group of companies.

Also on Squires Lane, Finchley Urban District Council opened its first swimming pool in 1915, which was closed in the 1990s. The swimming baths were demolished and replaced by terraced housing. Further along the road Squires Lane School was built in 1906; this became Manor School in 1932 and Manorside School in 1936.

=== Nether Street and West Finchley ===
Nether Street was recognised by the mid-14th century as an old street, sometimes called "Lower Street" in later periods. Essentially an access road to properties and land, the most important of which were Moss Hall (see North Finchley) and Brent Lodge. Brent Lodge was built on land which had been part of "Warren’s Gift", a charitable estate, sometime between 1817 and 1824. It was a substantial property whose grounds were considerably reduced during the 1920s. The house was demolished in 1962 despite efforts by the comedian Spike Milligan and the Finchley Society.

West Finchley station on the LNER railway opened on 1 March 1933 and became part of the London Underground upon electrification on 14 April 1940. Nether Street has one claim to fame as the childhood home of the actor Terry-Thomas who received some of his early education at Fernbank School in Hendon Lane.

West of Nether Street is Dollis Brook, a tributary of the River Brent which forms the western boundary between the ancient parishes of Finchley and Hendon. The viaduct carrying the Mill Hill East branch of the Northern line at the bottom of Dollis Road was built between 1863 and 1867 to designs by Sir John Fowler. It has thirteen arches and is, at 80 feet high, the highest point above sea level on the London Underground system.

Beyond is a very large house called Nether Court. This estate was originally in the Mill Hill district of Hendon, but was brought into Finchley during boundary changes made in 1933. The house was built for local businessman Henry Tubbs in 1883 to the design of architect Percy Stone. Tubbs allowed Finchley Golf Club to use the grounds in 1892. The club ceased after 1914 but returned in 1930. A row of California redwood sequoia trees may be seen nearby.

At 60 Court House Road there is a plaque placed by the Finchley Society to Harry Beck, designer of the London Underground tube map, who lived here from 1936 until 1960 and used Finchley Central tube station where a replica map and commemorative plaque may be seen on the southbound platform.

== Notable people ==
- Ella Corfield, pharmacist, who was the younger daughter of the Reverend David Caird, Lyndhurst, Regent's Park Road, Church End
