= Cholderton and District Water Company =

British water company

Cholderton and District Water Company Limited
- Industry: Water Supply
- Founded: 1904
- Headquarters: Cholderton, England
- Area served: 21 square kilometres (8.1 sq mi) of Southern England
- Website: choldertonwater.co.uk

Cholderton and District Water Company Limited is a private water supplier, serving an area on the border of Hampshire and Wiltshire in the south of England. Until 1 May 2018 it was by far the smallest licensed water company in England and Wales, but since this time is no longer regulated by Ofwat and its area has formally become part of the area covered by Wessex Water as a licensed water company. It supplies about 2,500 people over an area of around 21 km^{2} in the parishes of Cholderton and Bulford in Wiltshire, and Shipton Bellinger, Thruxton, Amport and Quarley in Hampshire and is a private limited company with company number 357098.

The water company was established by the Cholderton and District Water Order 1904, confirmed by the Water Orders Confirmation Act 1904 (4 Edw. 7. c. clxxxvi), by Henry Charles Stephens, of Finchley, north London, the son of Henry Stephens, the founder of the Stephens Ink Company. It is owned by the Cholderton Estate.

Cholderton and District Water Company does not provide sewerage services; mains sewerage facilities are provided by Southern Water in its area.
