= Robert Marnock =

Scottish horticulturalist and garden designer

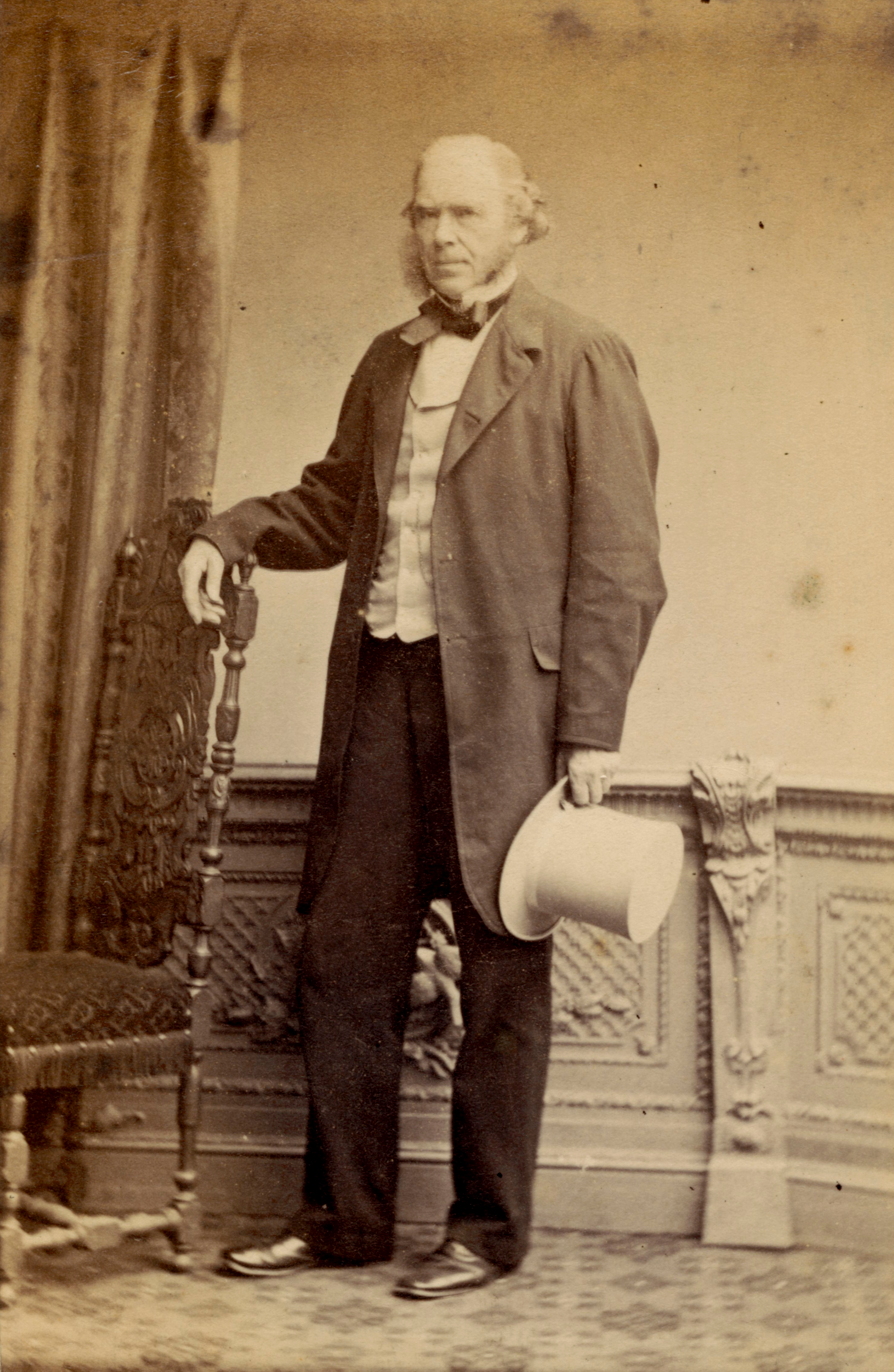
- c. 1865
- Born: 1800
- Died: 1889 (aged 88–89)
- Occupations: Gardener, landscape designer

Robert Marnock (1800–1889) was one of the leading Scottish horticulturalists and garden designers of the 19th century. He was considered by his contemporaries to be the best exponent of the Gardenesque school of landscape gardening.

== Life ==
Before he came to Sheffield, Marnock worked as the head gardener in Bretton Hall (now the Yorkshire Sculpture Park), Wakefield between 1829 and 1833. He was appointed by the Sheffield Botanical and Horticultural Society in 1833 to design and lay out the Sheffield Botanical Gardens, at an annual salary of £100. Marnock designed the Botanical Gardens in a style praised by the great gardening journalist John Claudius Loudon as revealing ‘a mind deeply imbued with knowledge of his profession.’ He became the first curator of the Gardens in 1836. A major restoration of the Gardens, completed in summer 2008, reinstated elements of Marnock's design.

In 1839, Marnock moved on to lay out the gardens of the Royal Botanic Society of London in Regent's Park and was appointed as the gardens' curator of the advice of John Claudius Loudon. He left this post in 1863 but continued to practise in his profession as a landscape gardener until 1879, during this time he returned to Sheffield for two commissions, Thornbury in 1865 and Weston Park in 1873.

In the 1860s, Marnock worked for Louis Huth on the park and garden of Possingworth Park, Sussex.

Another of his achievements was the landscaping in the 1870s of the grounds of Avenue House, Finchley, north London, the property of ink magnate and local MP Henry Charles Stephens. After Stephens' death in 1918 they became a public park, renamed Stephens House & Gardens in February 2014. Since then, the estate has benefited from National Lottery money to restore Marnock's designs to their original grandeur.

Marnock was editor of The Floricultural Magazine for four years.

One of the best preserved examples of his work is Dunorlan Park in Royal Tunbridge Wells which has recently undergone a £2.8 million transformation to restore it to the original Marnock design. The park is now on English Heritage's National Register of Historic Parks and Gardens. Robert Marnock lived near Tunbridge Wells, in Rusthall, and his last commission was the Grosvenor Recreation Ground, near Quarry Road, Tunbridge Wells, opened in 1889 by Mayor John Stone-Wigg.
