= Victoria Park, Finchley =

Park in the London Borough of Barnet

Coordinates: 51.6033°N 0.1838°W

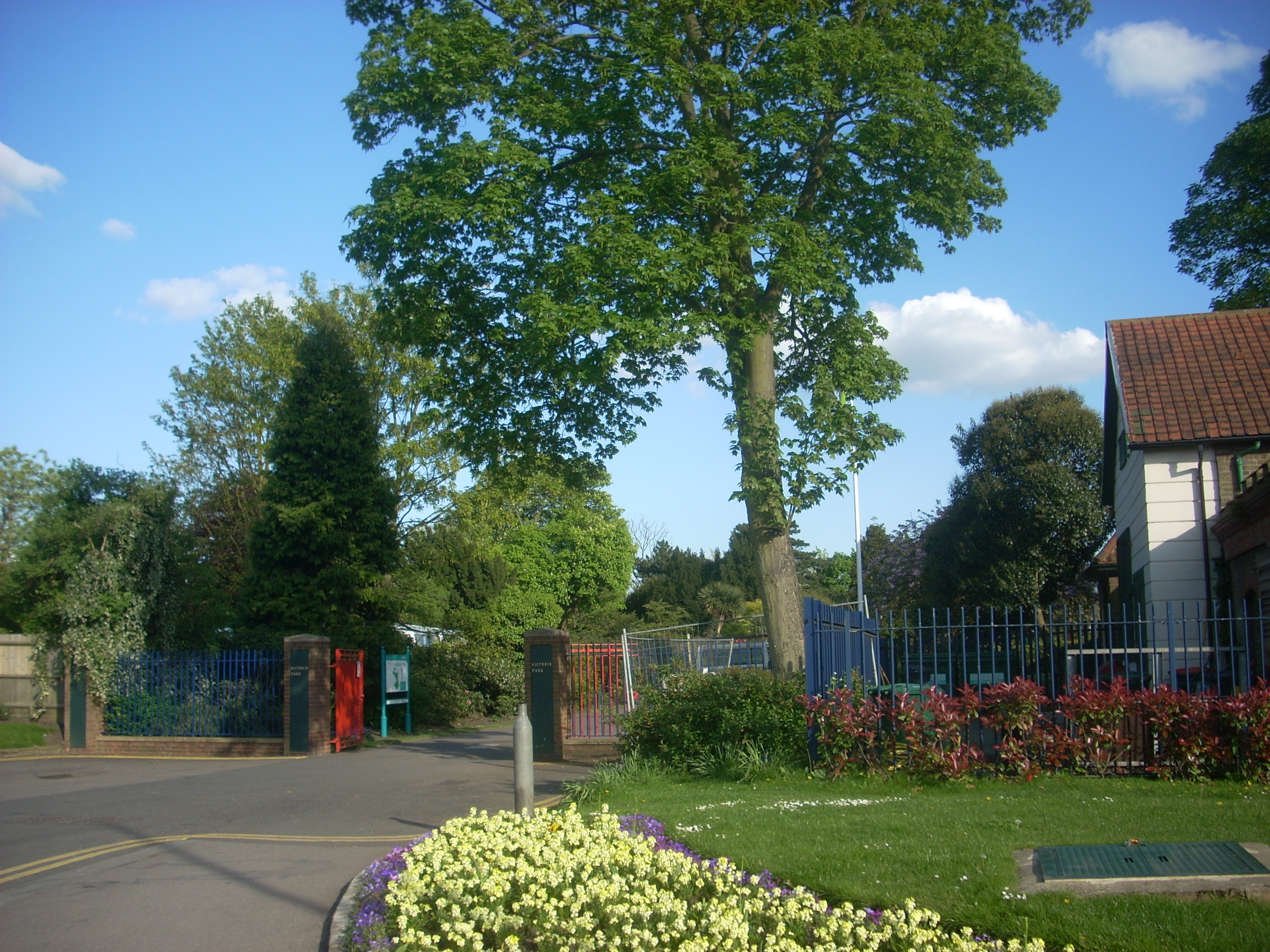
Ballards Lane entrance to the park, 2009

Victoria Park is in Church End in Finchley in the London Borough of Barnet. It covers seven hectares (17 acres). It is on the east side of Ballards Lane and fairly close to Finchley Central and West Finchley tube stations.

== History ==
Much of the park was originally part of Colby's Farm, where Charles Dickens wrote part of Martin Chuzzlewit. In 1887 Henry Stephens proposed converting the fields to a public park to commemorate Queen Victoria's Golden Jubilee, but it was not opened until 1902, a year after Queen Victoria's death. It was the only public park in the former Borough of Finchley until 1914.

The park is mainly grassland, with playgrounds, fine trees and ornamental gardens, playing fields, six public tennis courts, Finchley Victoria Bowling and Croquet Club with two lawns and a clubhouse, and a café open seven days a week.

There are entrances on Ballards Lane, Long Lane, Etchingham Park Road and Park View Road.

== Awards ==
Victoria Park achieved a Green Flag Award for 2009–2010. The Green Flag Award Scheme is run by The Civic Trust and is intended to be the benchmark against which the quality of public parks and green spaces can be measured. It also recognises the diversity and value of green space to the local community.

=== Gallery ===
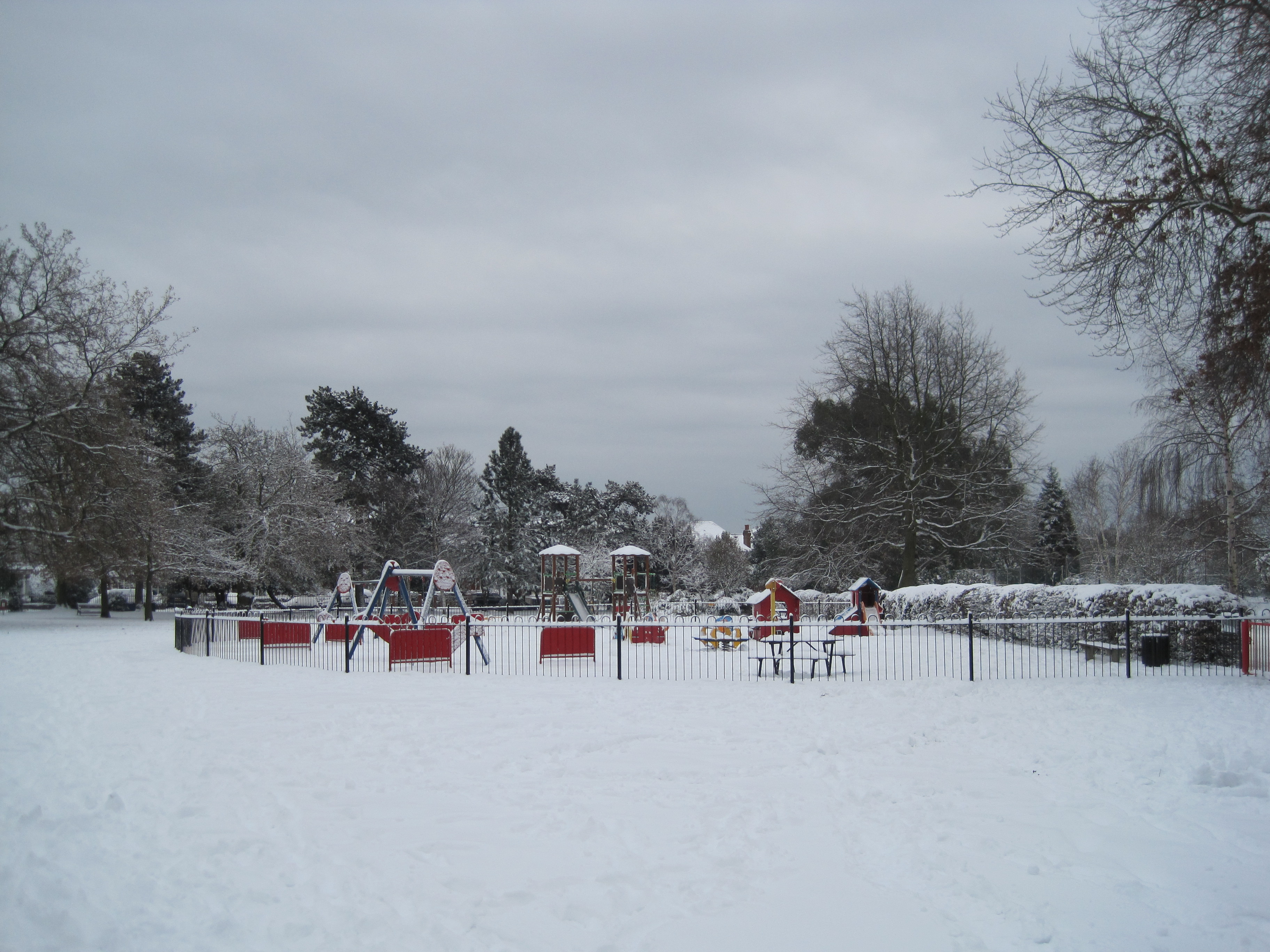
Playground in snow

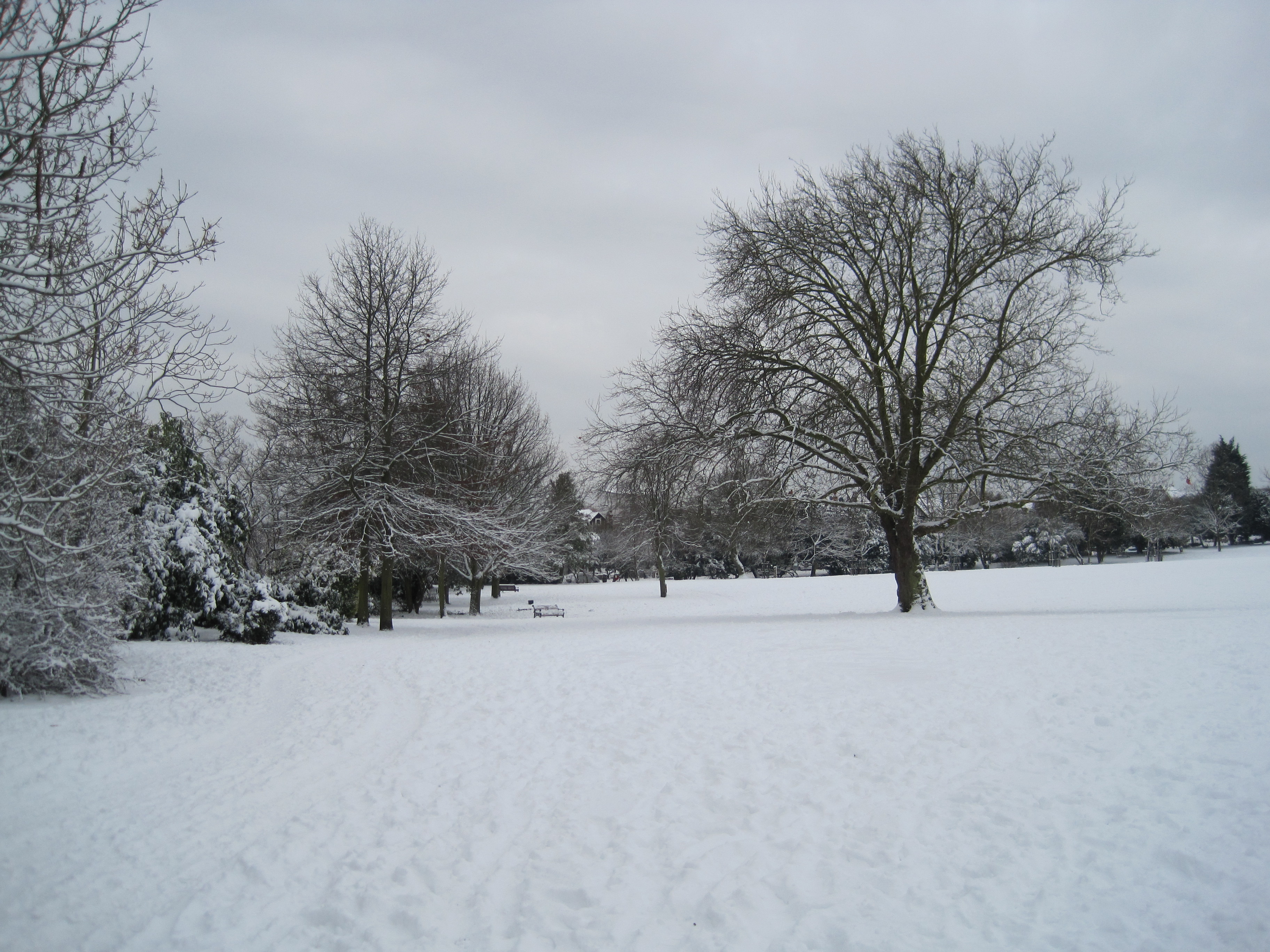
The park in snow
