= Long Lane Pasture =

Nature preserve in Finchley, Barnet, Greater London, United Kingdom

Coordinates: 51.5970°N 0.1811°W

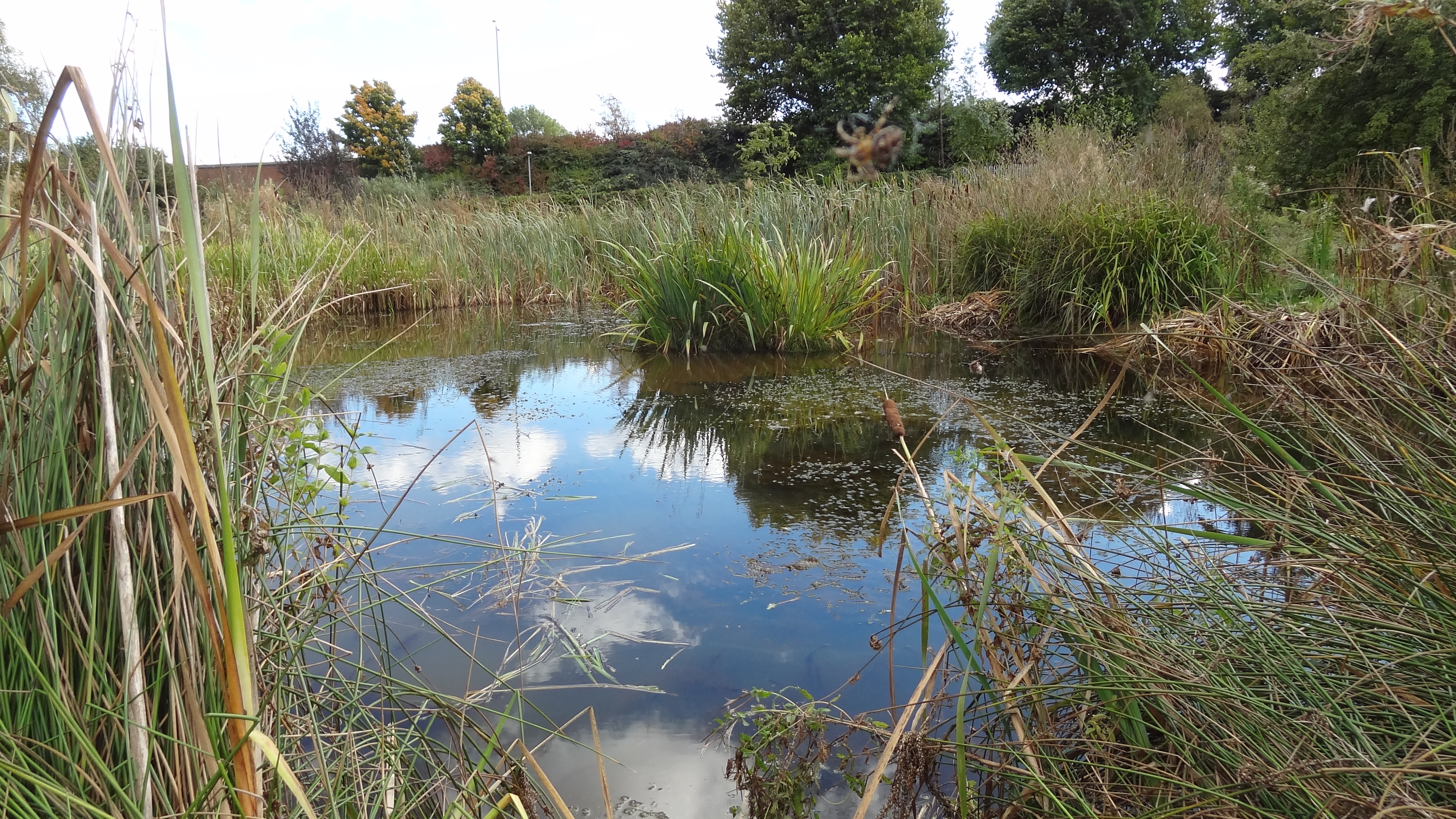

Long Lane Pasture is a 1.1-hectare (2.7-acre) nature reserve in Finchley in the London Borough of Barnet. It is owned by Barnet Council and managed by the Long Lane Pasture Trust. The council does not contribute any funds to the Trust.

The site was acquired in 1912 by the Municipal Borough of Finchley for "public recreation and enjoyment", but it lost half its land to the construction of the North Circular Road in the 1920s. In 1965 Finchley borough became part of the London Borough of Barnet, which thus acquired the site. It was open to the public and for many years horses grazed on it, until the 1980s when it was closed for roadworks.

In 1999 the council decided to sell it for housing, but the decision was overturned in 2006 following a public campaign to keep it as open space, and in 2009 the Trust was granted a 25-year lease. Under a management plan agreed with the council, the site is managed to protect its wildlife value and maintain and enhance its biodiversity.

There is access by a footpath from Long Lane immediately north of the North Circular Road.
