= Henry Stephens (Conservative politician) =

English businessman

- Stephens in 1895

Member of Parliament for Hornsey
- In office 1887–1900
- Preceded by: James McGarel-Hogg
- Succeeded by: Charles Barrington Balfour

Personal details
- Born: Henry Charles Stephens; 2 February 1841 Lambeth, London, England
- Died: July 1918
- Political party: Conservative
- Parent: Henry Stephens (father)
- Nickname: Inky

Henry Charles "Inky" Stephens (2 February 1841 – July 1918) was an English businessman and Conservative Party politician. He sat in the House of Commons from 1887 to 1900 as the Member of Parliament (MP) for the Hornsey division of Middlesex.

== Life ==
Stephens was born at 71 York Road, Lambeth, London on 2 February 1841, the son of Dr Henry Stephens and his second wife Anne, of Redbourn, Hertfordshire. Dr Henry Stephens (1796–1864) was the inventor in 1832 of an indelible "blue-black writing fluid" which was to become famous as Stephens' Ink and to form the foundation of a successful worldwide company for over 150 years.

The family moved to Finchley, north London, in 1844 where Dr Stephens bought and renovated a large residence named Grove House, in Ballards Lane. The outbuildings of Grove House were used by the inventor as a laboratory for research and manufacture of ink and wood stains; thus Henry Charles grew up among his father's work and learnt the business from a young age.

After an early education in France, the boy returned to England to attend University College School. He left school at the age of 16 but continued with chemistry and science studies (at the School of Mines, Kensington - now part of Imperial College London) while also involved in the family business. At the age of 23, in 1864, he took over the management of the company upon the sudden death of his father, who collapsed and died at Farringdon station.

The year before (1863), he had married Margaret Agnes Mackereth, the daughter of an old medical-student friend of his father. They lived for a while in Grove House with Stephens' widowed mother, then in 1874 purchased nearby Avenue House in East End Road and ten acres of adjacent land, on a site formerly known as Temple Croft Field.

Stephens enlarged and improved the house and in the 1870s sought advice about having the grounds developed, and employed landscape gardener Robert Marnock (1800–1889). Marnock's plans included lawns, ponds, mounds, paths and steps, and a walled kitchen garden and park-keeper's dwelling known as The Bothy (1882). Stephens added a water tower with adjacent building, a lodge, coach house and stable block and arranged for a number of rare trees to be planted throughout the grounds.

In 1872 the ink factory and offices were moved from Aldersgate Street to 275 Holloway Road, Holloway; in 1892 the factory moved again to nearby Gillespie Road, close to Arsenal station. In January 1888 Stephens was admitted to the Freedom and Livery of the Worshipful Company of Spectacle Makers. The Stephens' Ink company was innovative and profitable and Henry Stephens was a very wealthy man.

In February 1900 his eldest son, Henry O'Reilly Stephens, sought to enforce an agreement made with his father in June 1893 whereby he would be paid £25,000 or interest of 6% per annum of that sum for the rest of his life in the event of him leaving the company. The case was settled out of court on unknown terms.

Stephens was popular in Finchley as a businessman, lecturer and philanthropist and was known as "Inky" Stephens, the "uncrowned king of Finchley", as a result.

Aside from the family business and politics, he was a chemist, a local benefactor and philanthropist, and had an interest in agriculture and water management. He owned an estate in Cholderton, Wiltshire, where he set up the Cholderton and District Water Company in 1904.

== Political life ==
He was elected as MP for the Hornsey constituency, which included Finchley, at a by-election in 1887 (defeating the later-to-be-disgraced Horatio Bottomley) after the sitting Conservative MP was elevated to the peerage. He was re-elected in 1892, returned unopposed in 1895, and stood down from Parliament on a point of principle at the 1900 general election.

== Legacy ==
In 1887 he proposed, and later partially financed, the establishment of a park in Finchley to commemorate Queen Victoria's Golden Jubilee, and this was finally opened in 1902 as Victoria Park, Finchley's first public park. When Stephens died in 1918, he bequeathed Avenue House and its ten acres of grounds to 'the people of Finchley'.

The house and grounds were held in trust by Finchley Urban District Council, subject to the condition that they be 'open for the use and enjoyment always of the people, subject to reasonable regulation'. The house and grounds, now known as Stephens House and Gardens, are now run by a local charitable trust as an event venue and as a memorial to Dr Stephens and his son.

The estate, now with a new visitor centre and cafe, contains a small museum - The Stephens Collection - featuring the history of the Stephens family and the estate, the development of the Stephens ink company into a worldwide brand, and the history of writing materials generally.

Parliament of the United Kingdom
Preceded by James McGarel-Hogg	Member of Parliament for Hornsey; 1887 – 1900	Succeeded by Charles Balfour
