= Finchley =

District of London, England

Coordinates: 51.599°N 0.187°W

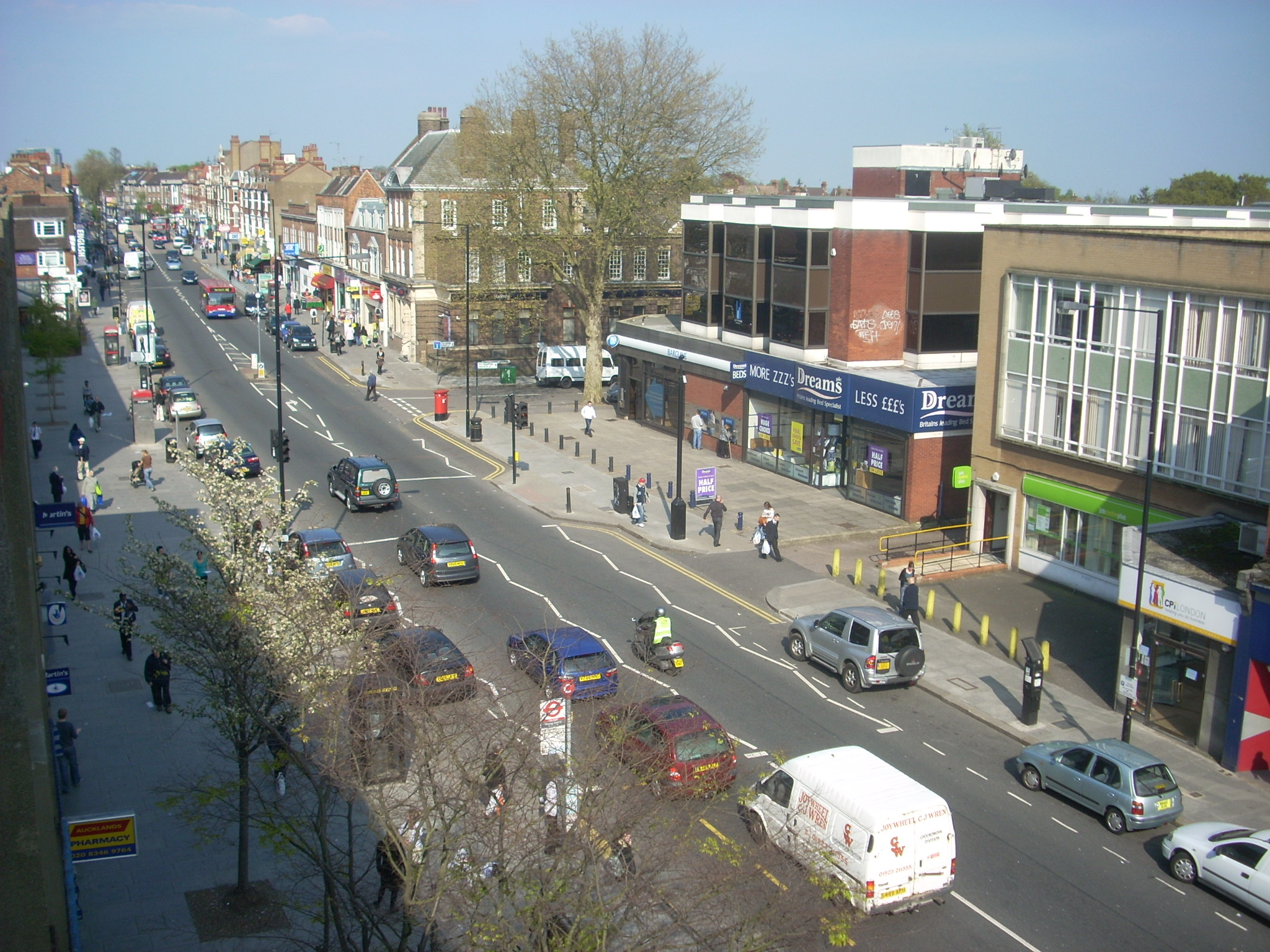
- Ballards Lane, Church End, Finchley

- Location within Greater London
- Population: 65,812 (2011 Census
- OS grid reference: TQ255905
  - Charing Cross: 6.8 mi (10.9 km) S
- London borough: Barnet
- Ceremonial county: Greater London
- Region: London
- Country: England
- Sovereign state: United Kingdom
- Post town: LONDON
- Postcode district: N2, N3, N12, parts of N20
- Dialling code: 020
- Police: Metropolitan
- Fire: London
- Ambulance: London
- UK Parliament: Finchley and Golders Green
- London Assembly: Barnet and Camden

Finchley (/ˈfɪntʃli/) is a large district of north London, England, in the London Borough of Barnet. 7 mi (11 km) north of Charing Cross, nearby districts include: Golders Green, Muswell Hill, Friern Barnet, Whetstone, Mill Hill and Hendon.

It is predominantly a residential suburb, with three town centres: North Finchley, East Finchley and Finchley Church End (Finchley Central). Made up of four wards, the population of Finchley was 65,812 as of 2011.

== History ==
Finchley (parish) population
1881	11,191
1891	16,647
1901	22,126
1911	39,419
1921	46,716
1931	58,964
1941	war #
1951	69,991
1961	69,370
# no census was held due to war
source: UK census

Finchley probably means "Finch's clearing" or "finches' clearing" in late Anglo-Saxon; the name was first recorded in the early 13th century. Finchley is not recorded in Domesday Book, but by the 11th century its lands were held by the Bishop of London. In the early medieval period the area was sparsely populated woodland, whose inhabitants supplied pigs and fuel to London.

Extensive cultivation began about the time of the Norman conquest. By the 15th and 16th centuries the woods on the eastern side of the parish had been cleared to form Finchley Common. The medieval Great North Road, which ran through the common, was notorious for highwaymen until the early 19th century.

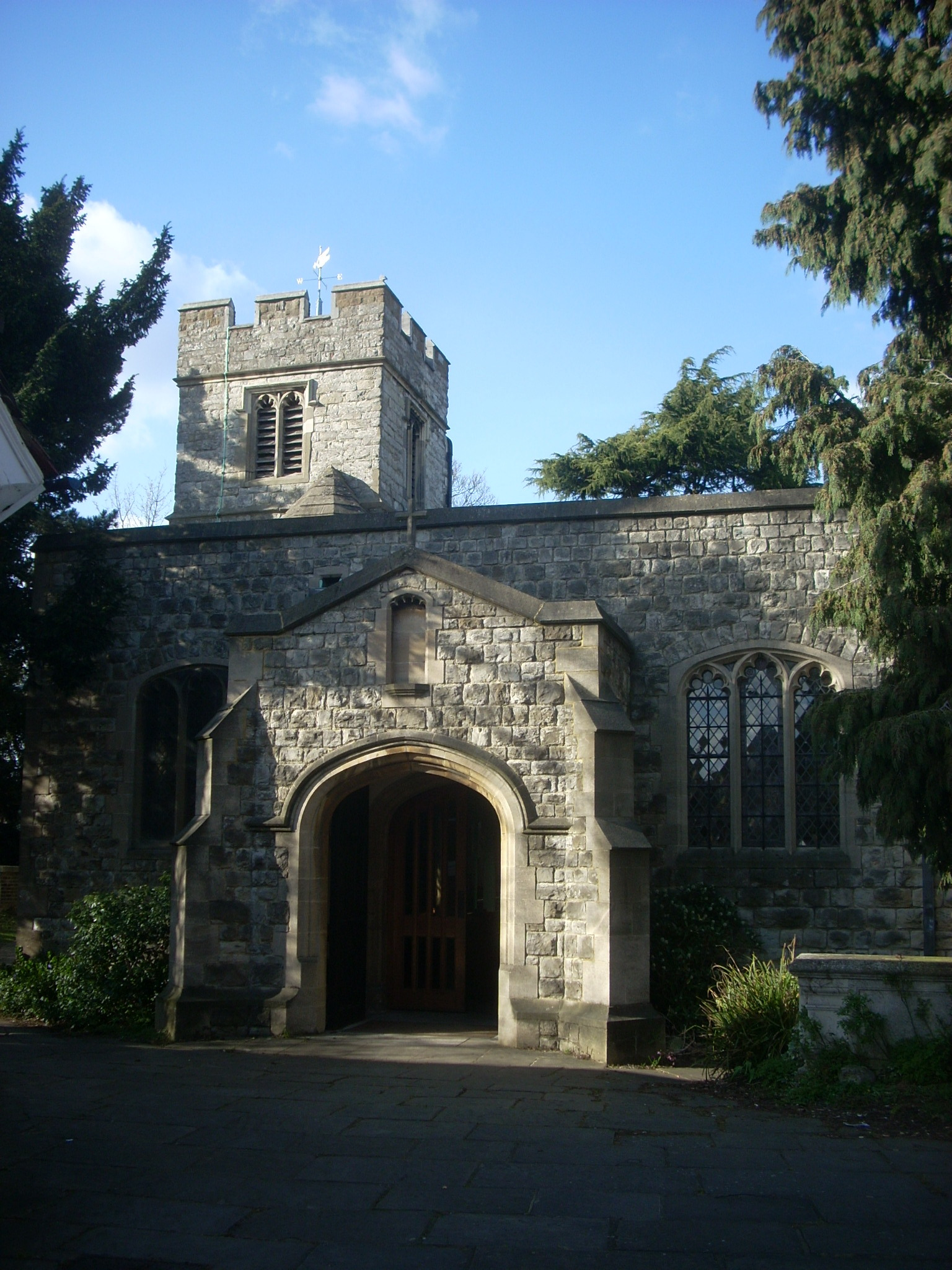
St Mary's Church

St Mary-at-Finchley Church is first recorded in the 1270s. Near the northern gate to the Bishop of London's park, the hamlet of East End, later East Finchley, had begun to develop by 1365. By the 18th century Finchley was well known for the quality of its hay, which was the dominant agricultural activity until the second half of the 19th century. North Finchley only began to develop after the enclosure of the common during the 1820s.

It formed an ancient parish in the county of Middlesex, originally within the hundred of Ossulstone and later becoming its own urban district, which was then incorporated as a municipal borough in 1933. It has been part of Greater London since 1965.

The Edgware, Highgate and London Railway (later the Great Northern Railway) reached Finchley in 1867. It ran from Finsbury Park via Finchley to Edgware. The branch from Finchley to High Barnet opened in 1872. In 1905 tram services were established in Finchley, and extended shortly afterwards to Barnet. They were eventually replaced by trolleybuses.

In 1933, the Underground New Works Programme (1935–1940), to electrify the lines through Finchley, and connect the Northern line from Archway to East Finchley, via a new tunnel was announced. Much of the work was carried out and East Finchley station was rebuilt, but the project was halted by the second world war. All passenger services from Finchley to Edgware ended in September 1939. Nevertheless, Underground trains began running from central London to High Barnet in 1940, and to Mill Hill East, to reach the army barracks, in 1941.

After the war, the introduction of London's Metropolitan Green Belt undermined pre-war plans and the upgrading between Mill Hill East and Edgware (the 'Northern Heights' project) was abandoned, although the line continued to be used by steam trains for goods traffic through Finchley, until 1964.

== Governance ==
Wards of Finchley Urban District in the 1930s

Wards of Finchley Municipal Borough in the 1950s

From around 1547 Finchley had a parish vestry, which became a local board in 1878, an urban district council in 1895, and finally a municipal borough council between 1933 and 1965. The area is now part of the London Borough of Barnet.

From 1959 to 1992 the Finchley constituency was represented in Parliament by Margaret Thatcher, UK Prime Minister from 1979 to 1990. Finchley is now included in the new constituency of Finchley and Golders Green.

In February 2010, the Green Party held its spring party conference at the artsdepot in North Finchley.

== Geography ==
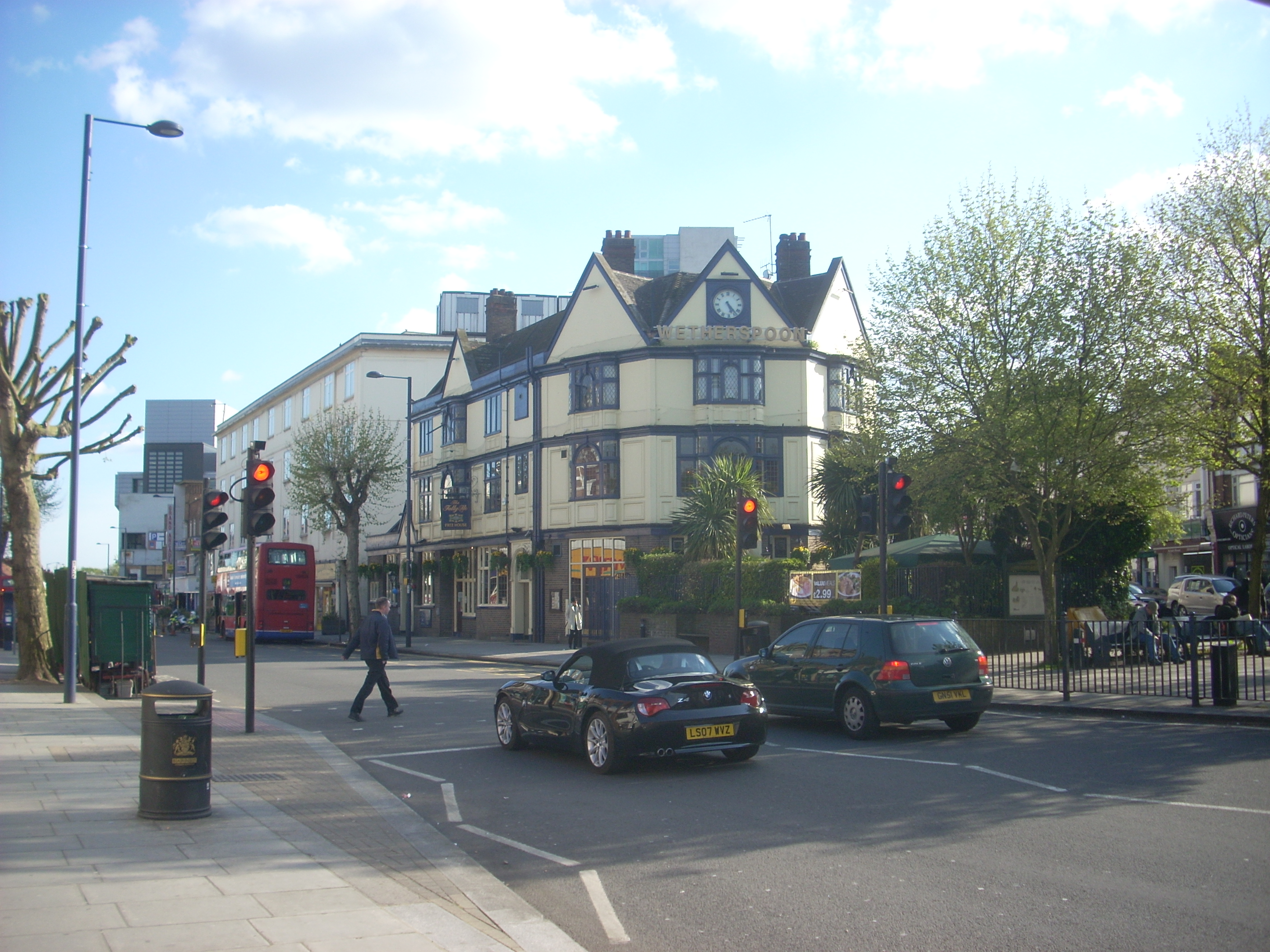
Tally Ho Corner in North Finchley

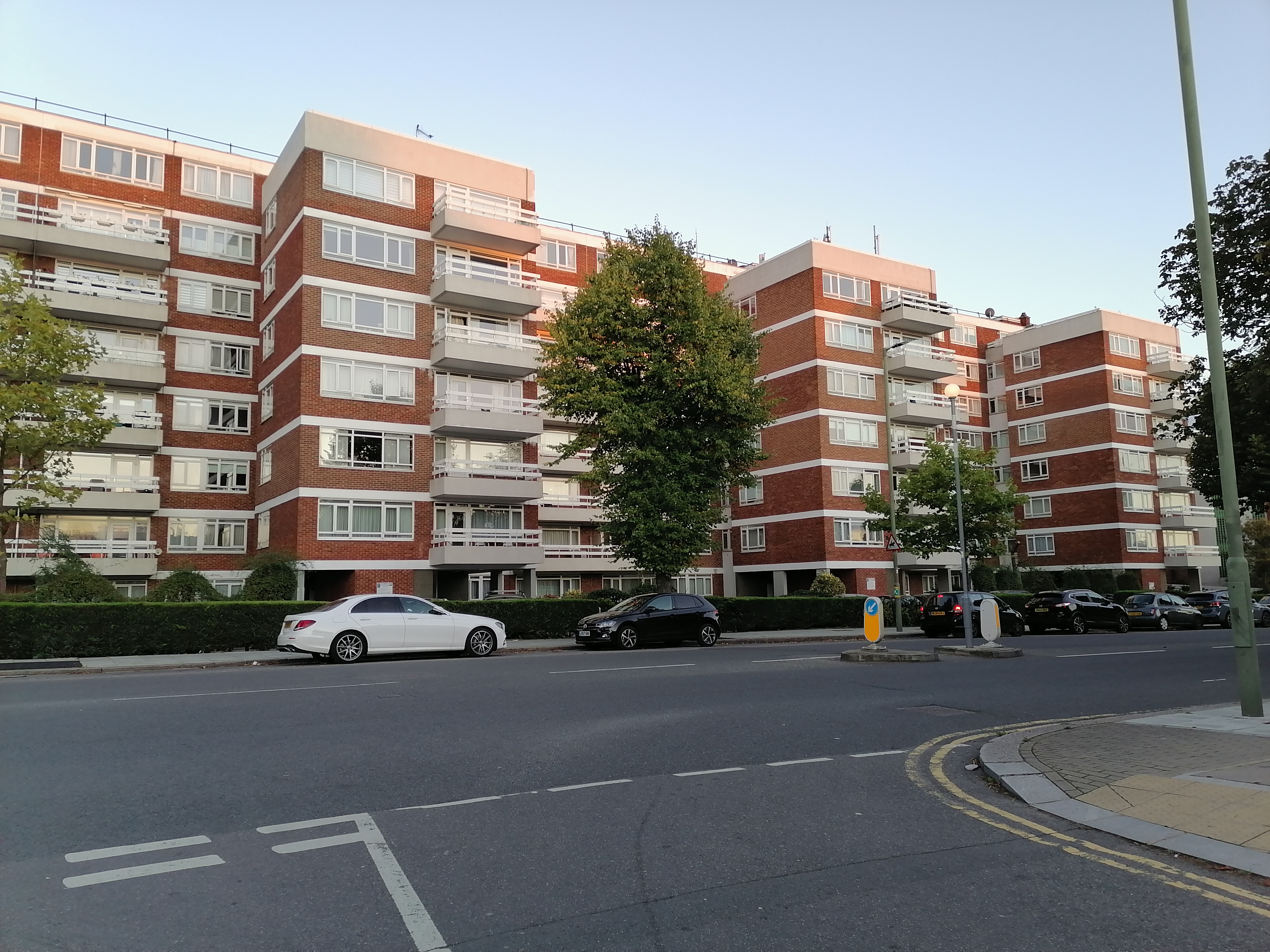
Apartments in Finchley (Church End)

Finchley is on a plateau, 90 metres (300 ft) above sea level 11 km (6.8 mi) north of Charing Cross and 6 km (3.7 mi) south of Barnet. To the west is the Dollis valley formed by Dollis Brook the natural western boundary of Finchley. Mutton Brook forms the southern boundary, joining the Dollis Brook to become the River Brent.

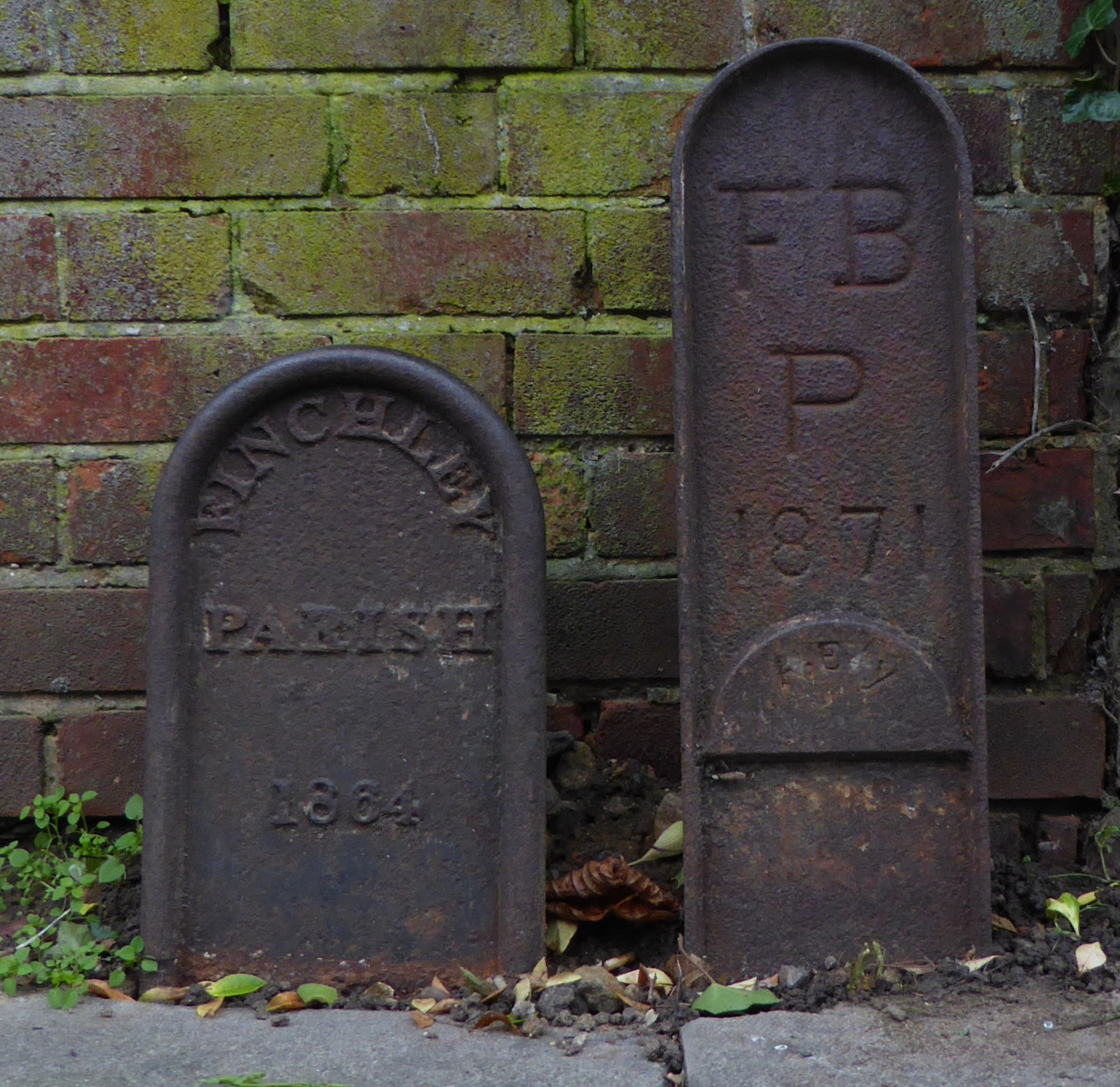
Parish boundary markers dated 1864 and 1871 between Finchley and Friern Barnet

Most of Finchley is on boulder clay or glacial moraine, skirted by a layer of gravel, then the underlying layer of London clay. This roughly triangular gravel line was the most fertile area; hamlets which grew at the three corners evolved into Finchley's early population centres corresponding to the three town centres in the area:

- Church End, often known as "Finchley Central" (particularly since the station was renamed), the area north and west of the North Circular Road, centred on Ballards Lane and Finchley Central Underground station, and in postal area N3;
- East Finchley, roughly between Highgate and the North Circular Road, and in postal area N2;
- North Finchley, surrounding Tally-Ho corner, stretching west to the Northern line, in postcode district N12.

The residential areas of West Finchley, in postcode district N3, and Woodside Park, in postcode district N12, centre on their respective tube stations to the west of the area. Between East Finchley and Finchley Central is Long Lane, which runs parallel to the tube line and is dotted with small shopping parades.

The area of London known as 'Finchley Road', around Finchley Road Underground station, is not part of Finchley, but instead refers to a district further south at Swiss Cottage, Camden. The area is named after a section of the A41 road, which runs north to Golders Green and eventually continues to Henlys Corner on the North Circular Road and on to Finchley.

== Demography ==
According to the 2011 Census in Finchley Church End ward, 67% of the population was White (47% British, 18% Other, 2% Irish), 8% South Asian and 6% Other Asian. The largest religion was Judaism, claimed by 31% of the population, whereas Christians made up 28%. West Finchley ward was 61% White (40% British, 18% Other, 3% Irish), 13% South Asian and 8% Other Asian.

== Landmarks ==
St Mary's at Finchley is the parish church, with parts dating from the 13th century.

College Farm is the last farm in Finchley; it was a model dairy farm, then a visitor attraction. The Phoenix Cinema in East Finchley with its 1930s art deco façade is one of the oldest purpose-built cinemas in the United Kingdom.

The Sternberg Centre for Judaism in the old Manor House (formerly convent and school of St Mary Auxiliatrice) at 80 East End Road in Finchley is a Jewish cultural centre. It was founded to facilitate Reform and Liberal Jewish institutions, attached to the Movement for Reform Judaism.

The Archer, on East Finchley tube station, is a 10-foot-tall (3.0 m) statue by Eric Aumonier of a kneeling archer having just released an arrow. The statue La Délivrance depicts a naked woman holding a sword (and is informally known as the Naked Lady); it stands at the approach to Finchley from the south, in a grassed area beside Regent's Park Road, just north of Henlys Corner.

== Transport ==
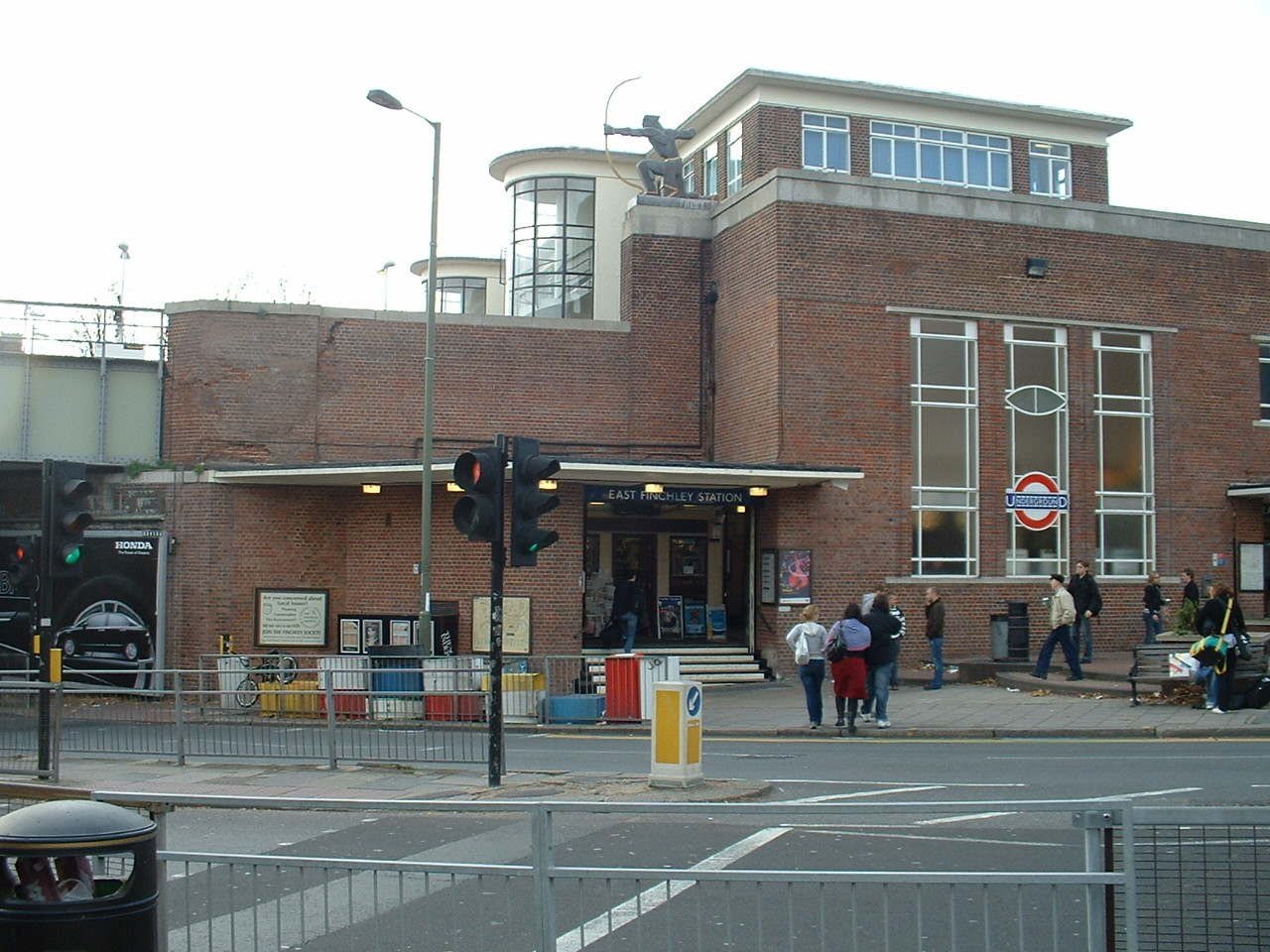
East Finchley tube station

Transport for London is responsible for transport in Finchley. Finchley has fiveLondon Underground stations, all on the High Barnet branch of the Northern line, which serves the West End and City (financial district).

- East Finchley in zone three, serves East Finchley and is 21 minutes from Charing Cross.
- Finchley Central in zone four, serves Finchley, Church End and is 25 minutes from Charing Cross.
- West Finchley in zone four, serves North Finchley and is 27 minutes from Charing Cross.
- Woodside Park in zone four, serves North Finchley and is 29 minutes from Charing Cross.
- Whetstone in zone four, serves Whetstone / sections of North Finchley and is 31 minutes from Charing Cross.

Two of London's major roads, the east–west A406 North Circular Road and the north–south A1 meet and briefly merge at Henlys Corner at the southern edge of Finchley.

North Finchley bus station is a hub with nine bus routes using bus stops around Tally Ho Corner.

== Education ==
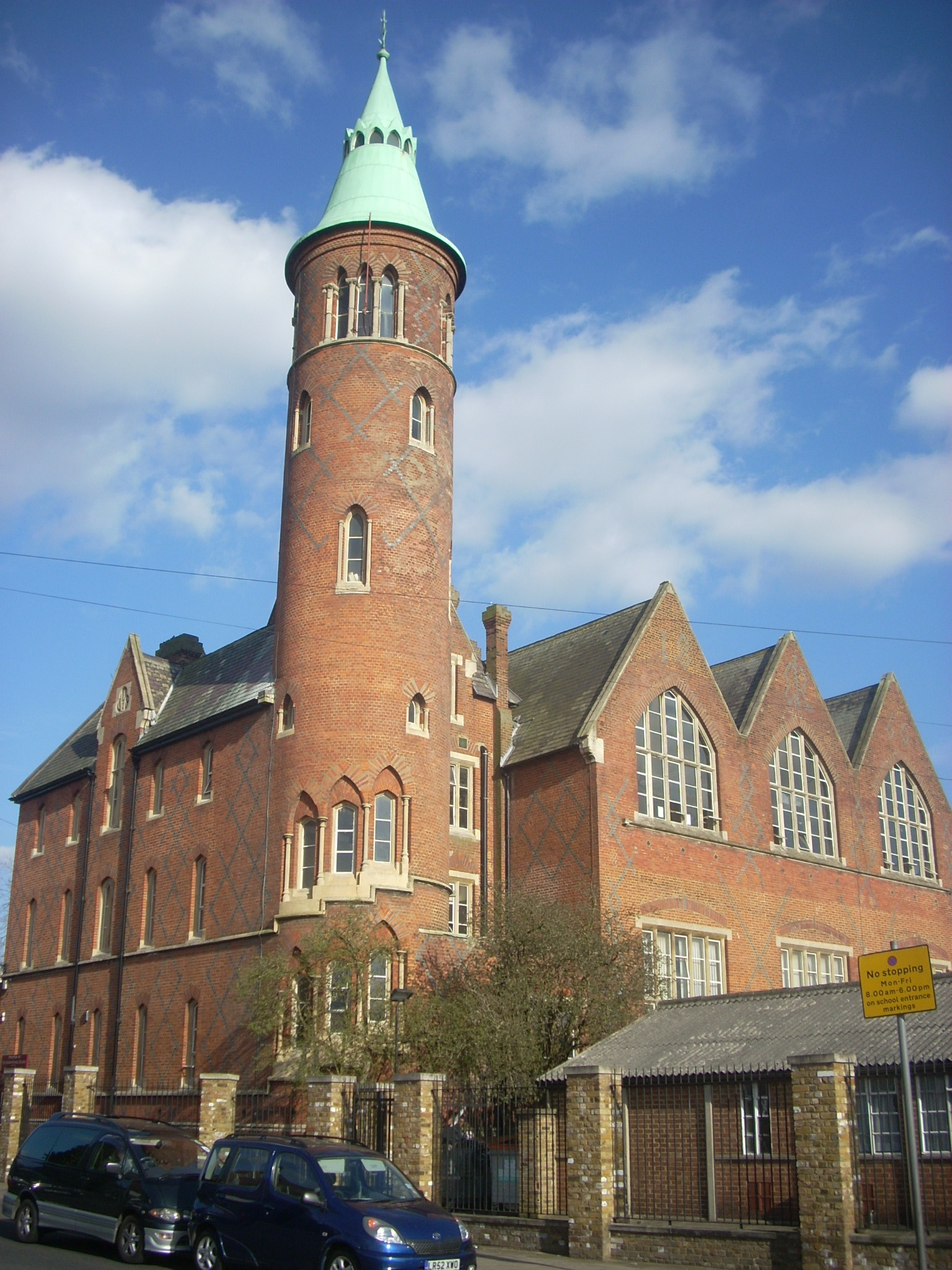
The old Christ's College, now a secondary school

There are 17 primary schools in the district.

There are seven secondary schools:

- The Archer Academy
- Bishop Douglass Catholic School
- Christ's College Finchley
- The Compton
- Finchley Catholic High School
- St. Michael's Catholic Grammar School
- Wren Academy

There is also a secondary special school, Oak Lodge Special School in East Finchley.

Woodhouse College in North Finchley, on the site of the old Woodhouse Grammar School, is one of two colleges in the borough.

== Sports ==
The local football team Old Finchleians (nicknamed the OFs) formed in 1901 who play home games at The Old Finchleians Memorial Ground in Southover and are members of the Southern Amateur League.

Wingate & Finchley plays in the premier division of the Isthmian league. The club was formed in 1991 following the merger between Finchley Football Club (est. 1874) and Wingate Football Club (est. 1946). Although the club is sometimes incorrectly perceived to be exclusively Jewish, it is open to people of every religion and ethnic background. Wingate & Finchley play home games at Summers Lane.

The local rugby team is Finchley RFC. Finchley Cricket Club (founded 1832), plays in the Middlesex premier league, at Arden Field, East End Road, N3. Finchley golf club on Frith Lane was designed by five-times Open Champion James Braid.

Finchley Victoria Bowls and Croquet Club, with two greens and a modern clubhouse in Victoria Park, offers lawn bowls, croquet and pétanque facilities in the summer and year-round social activities.

== Public services ==
Veolia Water Central Limited, formerly Three Valleys Water, supplies Finchley's water; the area is in the south-east corner of the company's water supply area. EDF Energy Networks is the Distribution network operator licensed to distribute electricity from the transmission grid to homes and businesses in Finchley.

Finchley Memorial Hospital, on Granville Road, North Finchley, was a small NHS hospital administered by NHS Barnet, a primary care trust. Built with local donations in 1908 it was originally Finchley Cottage Hospital, renamed and expanded after the First World War as a war memorial. A modern new hospital on adjacent land opened in September 2012; the old hospital buildings were demolished.

London Ambulance Service responds to medical emergencies in Finchley. Policing in Finchley is by the Metropolitan Police Service. Statutory emergency fire service is by London Fire Brigade, which has a station on Long Lane.

== Community facilities ==
The artsdepot, a community arts centre including a gallery, studio and theatre, opened in 2004, at Tally Ho Corner, North Finchley.

Finchley Film Makers was founded as the Finchley Amateur Cine Society in 1930, making it one of the oldest clubs in the Country. It meets at the Quaker Meeting House in Alexandra Grove, North Finchley.

Victoria Park is off Ballards Lane between North Finchley and Finchley Central. It was proposed in 1887 to mark Queen Victoria's golden jubilee and opened in 1902 to be Finchley's first public park. It is home to tennis courts and Finchley Victoria Bowling and Croquet Club. There is also a small nature reserve adjacent to the North Circular Road known as Long Lane Pasture.

Avenue House in East End Road was built in 1859. In 1874 it was acquired by Henry Charles Stephens, known as "Inky" Stephens, the son of the inventor of indelible blue-black ink Dr Henry Stephens. On his death in 1918 he bequeathed the house and its grounds for 'Public enjoyment subject to reasonable rules'. The estate, a private garden to which public access is granted, is now known as Stephens House and Gardens and managed from 2002 on a 125-year lease by Avenue House Estate Trust, an independent charity.

It has a visitor centre with a small museum, the Stephens Collection, which covers the history of the Stephens family, the Stephens Ink company and the history of writing materials. The bequest also included Avenue House Grounds, designed by the leading nineteenth-century landscape gardener Robert Marnock. This has a tearoom, a children's playground, a walled garden and building called The Bothy, a pond and rare trees. A recent attraction (2014) is a bronze statue of Spike Milligan sitting on a bench.

== Cultural references ==
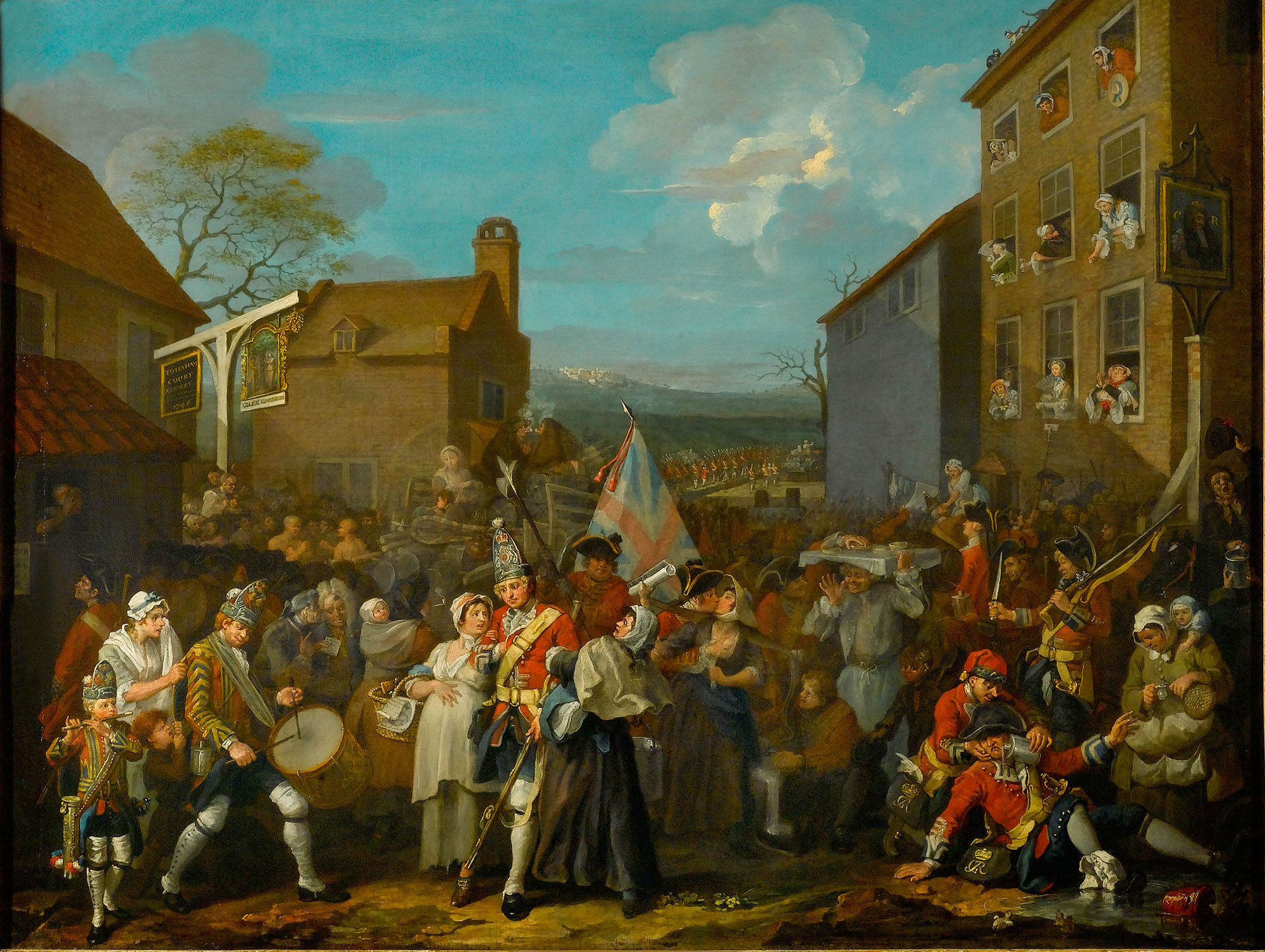
March of the Guards to Finchley

William Hogarth painted his satirical March of the Guards to Finchley in 1750. It is a depiction of a fictional mustering of troops on London's Tottenham Court Road to march north to Finchley to defend the capital from the second Jacobite rebellion of 1745.

A number of fictional characters have been associated with the area, including:

- In Charles Dickens' The Old Curiosity Shop Mr Garland, one of the principal characters, lives in "Abel Cottage, Finchley".
- In More Peers, a book of comic verse by Hilaire Belloc, one of the poems is about Lord Finchley.
- Bluebottle, a character in the 1950s BBC radio series The Goon Show, hails from East Finchley. Peter Sellers, who played Bluebottle, lived in the area at one time.
- In the Disney film series The Chronicles of Narnia, the Pevensies are from Finchley. In the original book series, it is not specified which part of London they are from.

The Monty Python's Flying Circus comedy sketch "The Funniest Joke in the World" is set in Finchley.

In various episodes of the Channel 4 comedy Peep Show Finchley is used as an on-site shooting location.

The background of the cover of Iron Maiden's second studio album, Killers, depicts Etchingham Court, North Finchley, where artist Derek Riggs lived at the time.

The 2013 David Bowie song 'Dirty Boys' on The Next Day album makes reference to Finchley Fair.

== Notable people ==
In birth order

- Sir Thomas Allen (1603–1681), politician and lawyer, died in Finchley.
- Thomas Pengelly (1650–1696), wealthy merchant, gave lodging to Richard Cromwell after the Restoration at a property he owned in Finchley.
- William Lawson (1774–1850), one of three earliest British explorers to cross the Blue Mountains in Australia, was born in Finchley.
- Rudolph Ackermann (1764–1834), Anglo-German inventor and bookseller, died in Finchley.
- Henry Stephens (1796–1864), who founded the Stephens Ink company, and his son Henry Charles Stephens, who was the local Member of Parliament (MP) from 1887 until 1900, lived in Finchley: Henry Charles in Avenue House which he left, in 1918, as a bequest to the people of Finchley, along with its grounds, now known as Stephens House and Gardens.
- Sir William Shee (1804–1868), the first Roman Catholic judge to sit in England and Wales since the Reformation, lived in Finchley.
- The novelist Charles Dickens (1812–1870) wrote Martin Chuzzlewit while staying at Cobley Farm near Bow Lane, North Finchley.
- Owen Suffolk (born 1829), Australian poet, autobiographer and confidence trickster, was born in Finchley.
- Octavia Hill (1838–1912), a social reformer and a founder of the National Trust, Kyrle Society and the Army Cadet movement lived at Brownswell Cottages on the High Road in East Finchley just south of the junction with the North Circular Road today.
- L. S. Bevington (1845–1895), anarchist poet, essayist and journalist, died and was buried in Finchley.
- Sid Penny (1875–1965), Rugby Union player for Leicester Tigers and England
- Dora Boothby (1881–1970), Wimbledon-champion tennis player, was born in Finchley.
- Eric Blore (1887–1959), actor, was born in Finchley.
- Private John Parr (1897–1914), the first British soldier and the first soldier of the Commonwealth killed in World War I, was born in Church End Finchley, and lived at 52 Lodge Lane, North Finchley.
- Harry Beck (1902–1974), an engineering draftsman who created the present London Underground Tube map in 1931, lived in Finchley. There is a plaque commemorating him along with a copy of his original map on the southbound platform at Finchley Central tube station.
- Terry-Thomas (1911–1990), comedian and actor, was born in Finchley.
- Gwilym Williams (1913–1990), a prominent figure in the Anglican Church who served as Bishop of Bangor and Archbishop of Wales.
- Wing Commander Ian Richard Gleed (1916–1943), World War II flying ace later revealed to have been gay, was born in Finchley.
- Vera Lynn (1917–2020), singer, and her husband Harry Lewis (1915–1998), a saxophonist, lived on Hendon Avenue in the 1950s and 1960s.
- Spike Milligan (1918–2002), the comedian who was chief creator and main writer of The Goon Show, lived in Woodside Park from 1955 to 1974. He was president and patron of the Finchley Society. His statue, sitting on a bench, occupies a prominent position at Stephens House and Gardens.
- Betty Driver (1920–2011), singer and actress, lived on Hendon Avenue in the 1950s with her husband, singer and theatrical agent Wally Petersen.
- Margaret Thatcher (1925–2013), UK Prime Minister 1979–1990, was Conservative Member of Parliament (MP) for Finchley from 1959 to 1992, although she lived in Chelsea before her time in Downing Street.
- Sir David John White (born February 1940) known as David Jason lived off Lodge Lane and attended Northfield Secondary Modern school in the 1950s, prior to his career as an actor.
- Peter Cleall (born 1944), actor and actors' agent, was born in Finchley.
- Jennie Stoller (1946–2018), actress, was born in Finchley
- Rick Wills (born 1947), bass guitar, member of the Bad Company, Foreigner, Jokers Wild, Small Faces and The Jones Gang, was born in Finchley.
- John Zarnecki (born 1949), space scientist, was born in Finchley.
- Jonathan Sacks (Lord Sacks) (1948–2020), Chief Rabbi, grew up in Finchley.
- Morgan Fisher (born 1950), keyboardist, member of the Mott the Hoople, lives in Finchley.
- Jerry Shirley (born 1952), drummer, member of the Humble Pie, was born in Finchley.
- Geoff Travis (born 1952), record company founder, grew up in Finchley.
- Tim Parks (born 1954), writer, grew up in Finchley.
- Steve Richards (born 1960), journalist, grew up in Finchley.
- Will Self (born 1961), writer, went to school in Finchley.
- John Bercow (born 1963), former Speaker of the House of Commons, grew up in Finchley and was a member of Finchley Young Conservatives.
- George Michael (1963–2016), singer, was born in East Finchley.
- Mark Thomson (born 1963), professional darts player, lives in Finchley.
- Dave Colwell (born 1964), guitarist, member of the Bad Company, Samson and Humble Pie, was born in Finchley.
- Ram Vaswani (born c. 1970), professional snooker and then poker player, lives in Finchley.
- Emma Bunton (born 1976), singer, member of the Spice Girls, was born in Finchley.
- Demis Hassabis (born 1976), artificial intelligence researcher and founder of DeepMind, grew up in Finchley.
- Jade Jones (born 1979), singer, member of the Damage, lives in Finchley.
- Jacob Collier (born 1994), composer and multi-instrumentalist, lives and records music in Finchley.
- Anna Popplewell (born 1988), actress

== Twinning ==
Finchley Borough had four twin towns; the London Borough of Barnet continues these links.

- Jinja, Uganda, since 1963
- Le Raincy, France, since 1962
- Montclair, United States, since 1945
- Siegen-Wittgenstein, Germany, since 1951

== Gallery ==
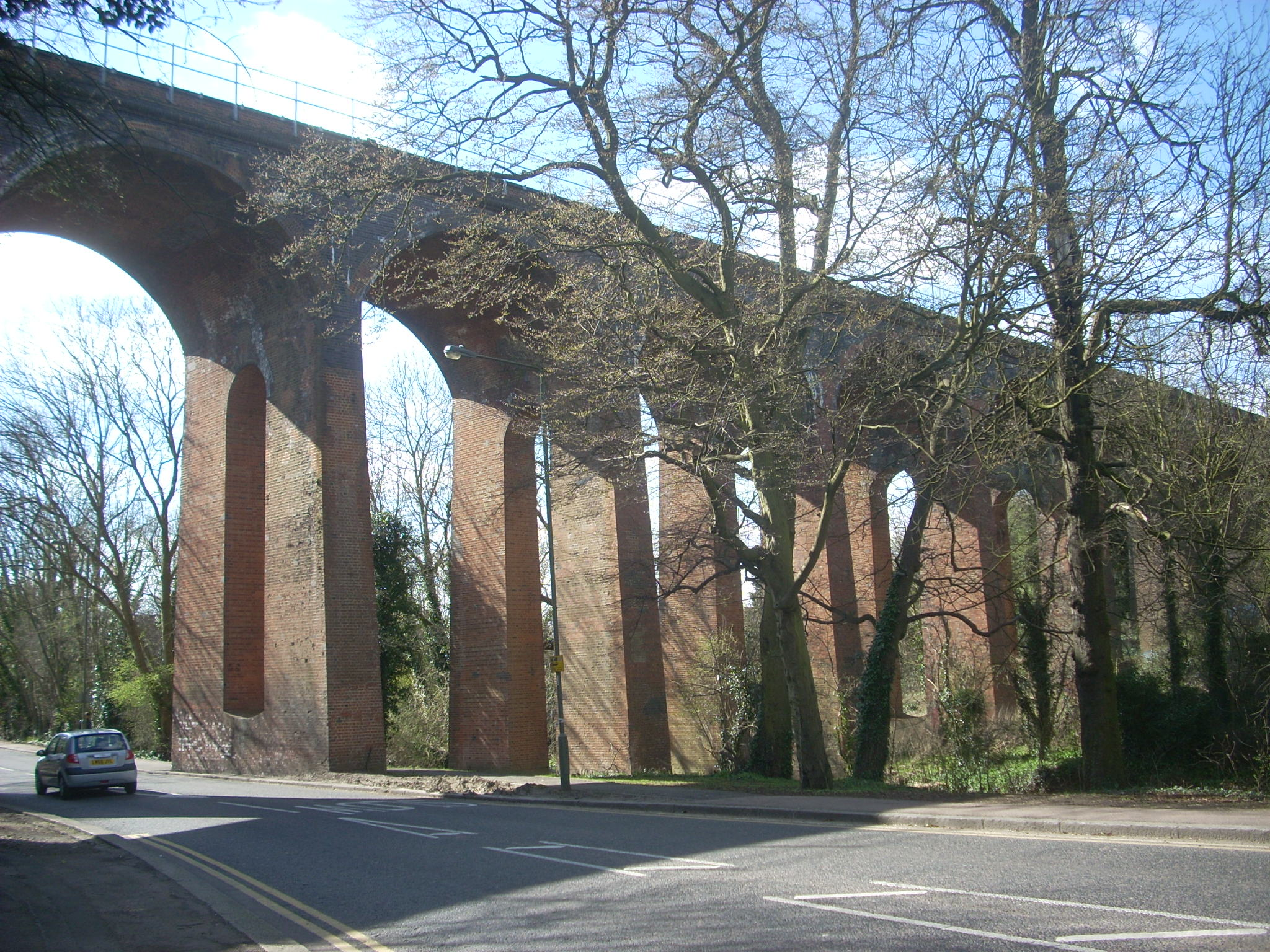
Dollis Brook Viaduct

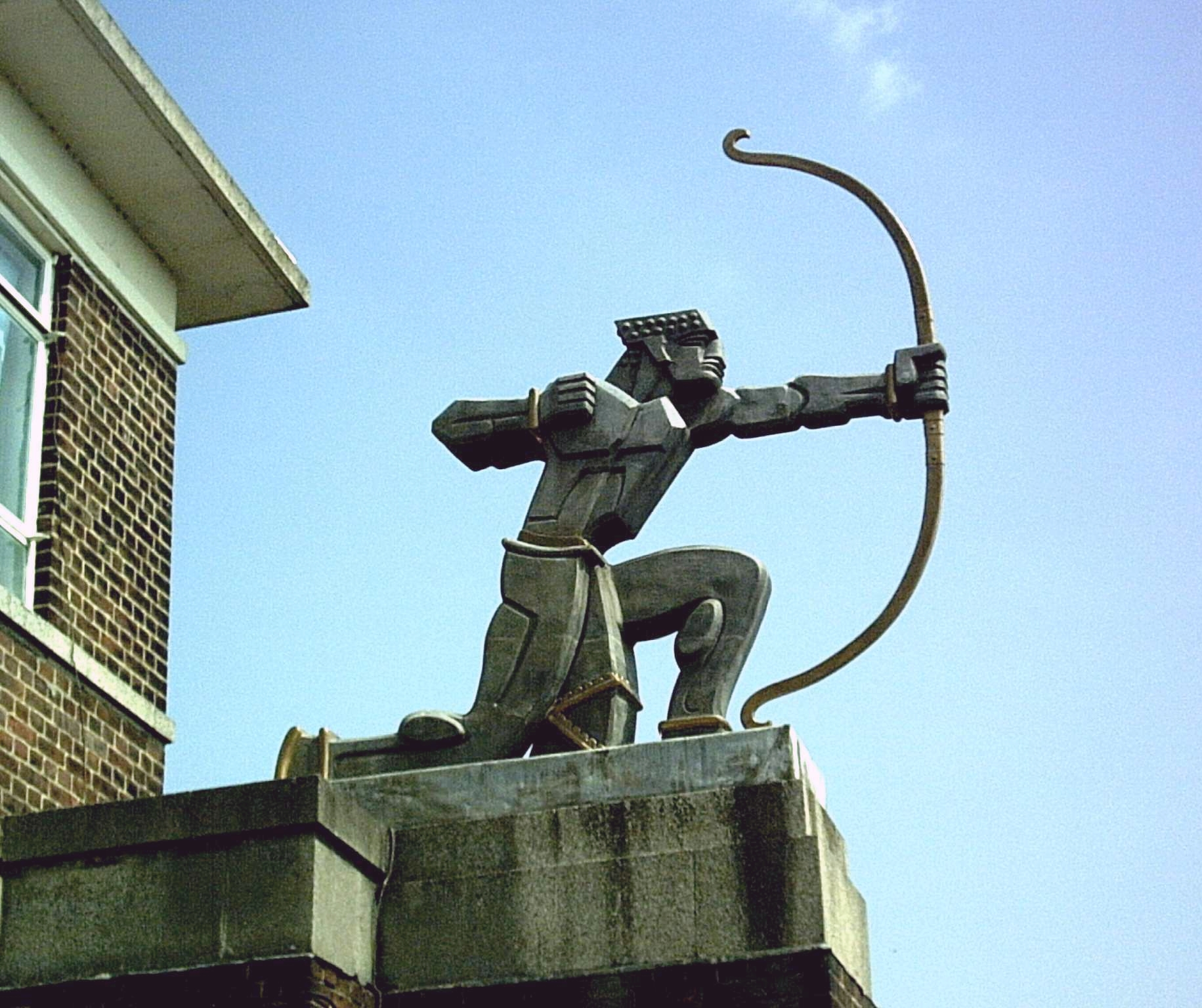
Art Deco 'Archer' Statue at East Finchley Tube Station by Eric Aumonier

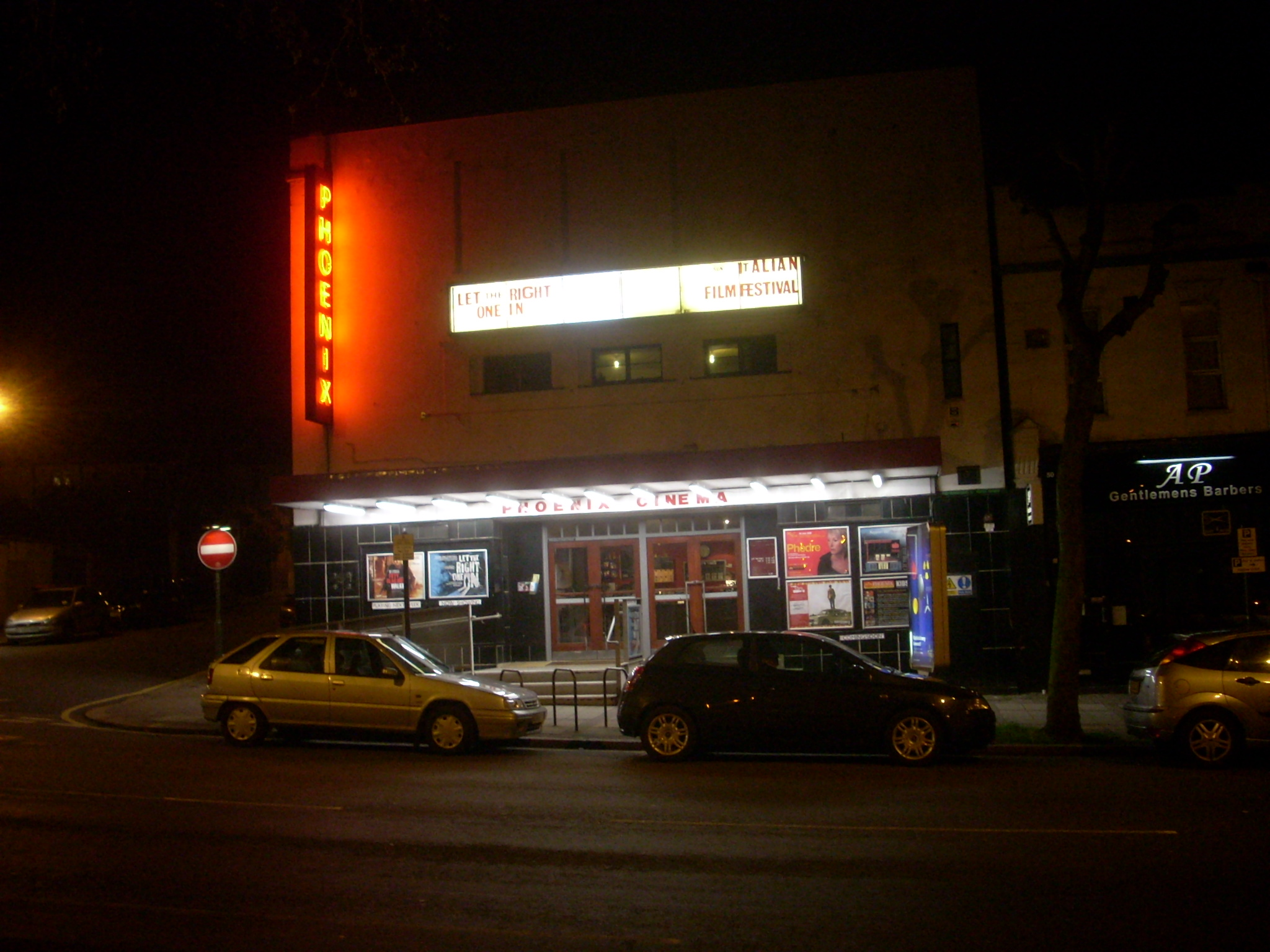
The Phoenix Cinema

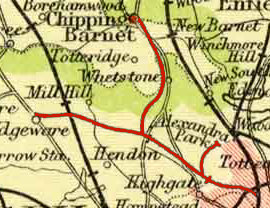
Route of Edgware, Highgate and London Railway highlighted on a 1900 map

== See also ==
- The Finchley Gap – a corridor of low-lying land between the drainage basin of the rivers Colne to the north and Brent to the west, possibly the remains of an Ice age overflow channel.
