= College Farm =

Farm in London, England

Coordinates: 51.593°N 0.202°W

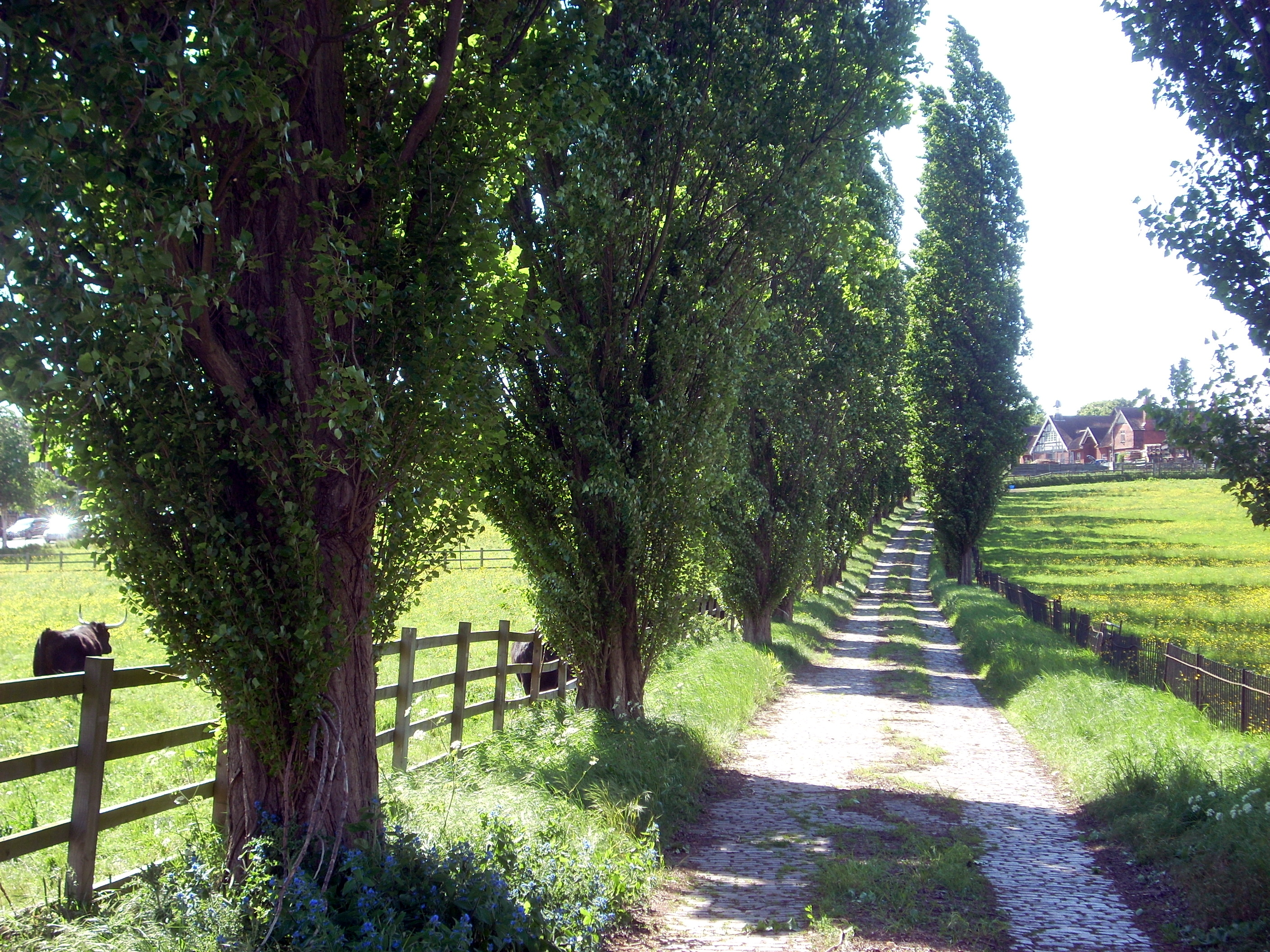
College Farm driveway

College Farm is the only farm site in Finchley, in the London Borough of Barnet. It currently trades as an equestrian and pet store. It is located in Regents Park Road, close to Henlys Corner on the North Circular Road. It has two residential roads running alongside it; Allandale Avenue and Fitzalan Road.

== History ==
In 1868 George Barham, founder of Express Dairies, leased Sheephouse Farm, a property of about 97 acres (390,000 m^{2}). In 1882/83 he had it rebuilt by Fredrick Chancellor as a model dairy farm, renaming it College Farm after the nearby Christ's College.

In 1898 College Farm was the scene of the "Finchley Murder", when the head cowman Thomas Webb was shot dead. The case was investigated by Scotland Yard's Chief Inspector Henry Moore, but Thomas's killer was never identified.

By the 1900s the company believed that the farm was not viable as a real farm, so it was decided to adapt it to become a visitor attraction in 1909, buying out the lease on the property of the farm buildings, and retaining a few of the adjacent fields from the original estate.

By the 1930s the residue of the farm was surrounded by houses, and was open to the public, with tea rooms and an exhibition of objects related to the dairy industry. In the 1950s and 1960s cows were grazed and milked on the site by Express Dairies. In 1973 Express Dairies left the site, and the dairy museum was broken up.

In 1974 the Department of the Environment purchased the estate with the intention of giving it to the London Borough of Barnet in exchange for open land at Henlys Corner intended for a flyover, which was never built. The farm was leased by Chris and Jane Ower, who ran it as a popular local attraction from 1980 until February 2001, when the site had to be closed because of restrictions caused by the foot-and-mouth outbreak.

Chris Ower, with the support of some local residents and friends of the farm, set up the College Farm Trust in 2004 with the intention of re-establishing the farm as a visitor centre. The Trust now owns the whole site and is working to raise the funds to reopen to the public. However, the trust was removed from the Charity Commission register on 1 February 2018 as it was not operating.

College Farm is a Site of Local Importance for Nature Conservation. It also has a silo which is a Grade II listed building.

== See also ==
- Nature reserves in Barnet
