= Henry Stephens (doctor) =

English surgeon, chemist, poet and inventor (1796–1864)

Henry Stephens, MRCS (March 1796 – 15 September 1864) was an English medical doctor, surgeon, chemist, writer, poet, inventor and entrepreneur. At medical school in London he was a friend of, and shared rooms with, poet John Keats, later wrote treatises on hernia and cholera, and conducted experiments to improve writing fluids and wood stains.

In 1832 after years of experimentation he created an indelible blue-black writing fluid, patented it in 1837 and later formed the Stephens Ink company which grew into a worldwide brand with a famous inkblot image.

== Early life ==
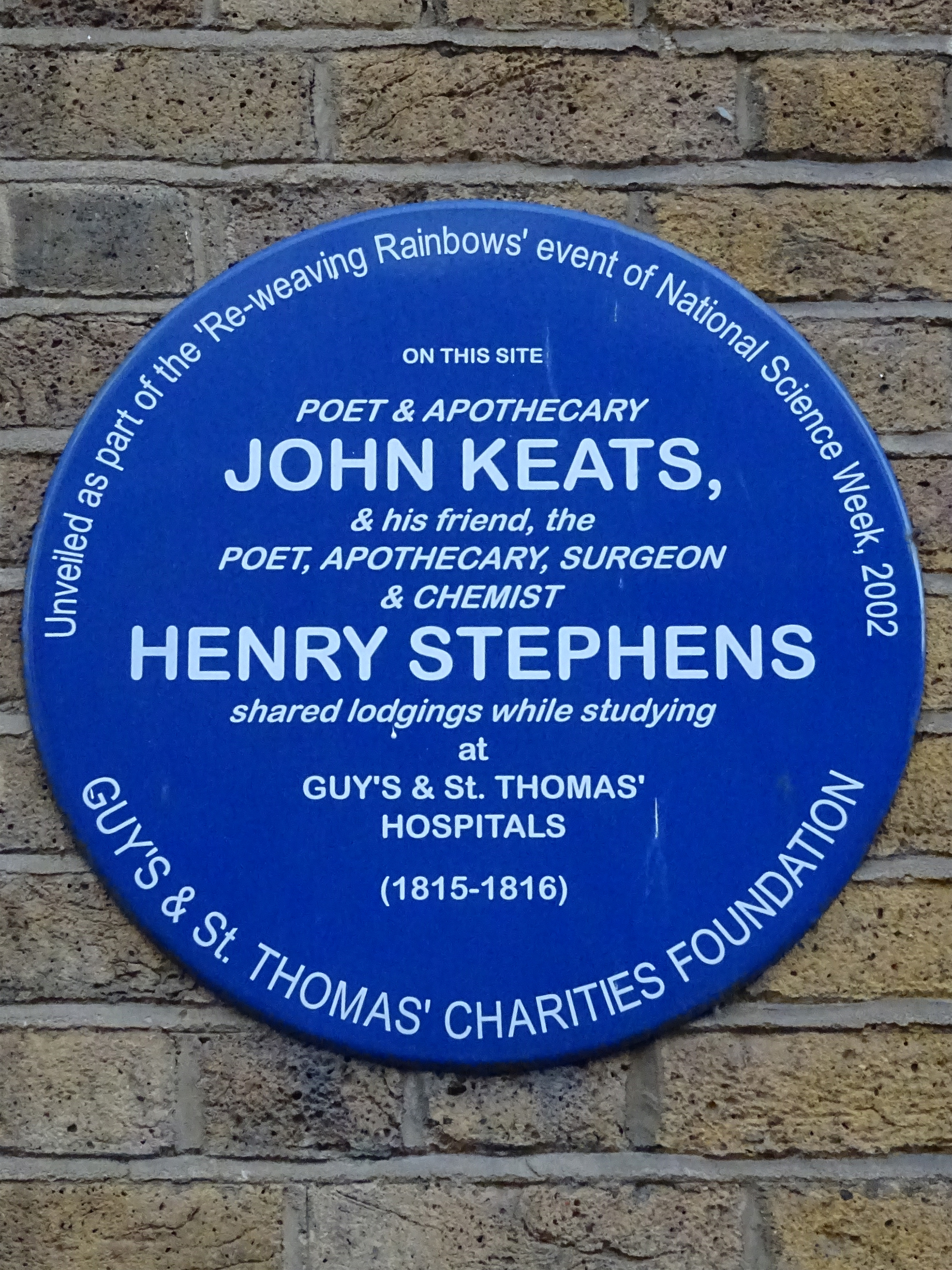
Blue plaque erected by Guy's & St. Thomas' Charities Foundation at 3 St Thomas Street, London SE1 9RS in 2002

Henry Stephens was born in Holborn, London, the second son of Joseph Stephens (1771–1820) and his wife Catherine (1763–1843), née Farey, but along with his elder brother John was soon moved to more rural Hertfordshire. The family lived briefly in Hatfield where sisters Frances (1798–1860) and Catherine (1800–1855) were born. Around 1801 they moved to Redbourn near St Albans where a fifth child, Josiah (1804–1865) was born. Joseph Stephens became the innkeeper at The Bull, the principal inn and busy staging-post in Redbourn High Street on a main stagecoach route between London and the north.

In 1811 Stephens was apprenticed to a local doctor in Markyate three miles north of Redbourn and in 1815 enrolled as a pupil in the united teaching school of Guy's and St Thomas' Hospital in London. He shared lodgings at 28 St Thomas Street, Southwark, with George Wilson Mackereth, whose daughter Stephens's son, Henry Charles, later married, and with John Keats, who was to become famous as a poet, and who died in Rome in 1821. It is on record that in 1816 Stephens helped Keats compose the line from Endymion book 1, "A thing of beauty is a joy forever ...".

On 14 March 2002, as part of the 'Re-weaving Rainbows' event of National Science Week 2002, Poet Laureate Sir Andrew Motion unveiled a blue plaque on the front wall of 28 St Thomas Street to commemorate the sharing of lodgings there by Keats and Stephens while they were medical students at Guy's and St Thomas' Hospital in 1815–16.

== Redbourn, 1817–1828 ==
After qualifying, Stephens returned to Redbourn where he developed a medical practice for ten years, dealing with all manner of medical problems including agricultural accidents and veterinary matters. He was a friend of the distinguished surgeon Sir Astley Cooper, physician to King William IV, who encouraged Stephens to return to London where his medical abilities could be put to greater use.

== Tourist and Travel Writer ==
In November 1827 Stephens embarked upon what he called his "Excursion to the North", a journey begun by stagecoach through Northampton and Leicestershire to Derby and Staffordshire. He visited Chatsworth House and Haddon Hall and walked many miles in the Matlock area. Stephens continued to Manchester and Liverpool, visited the Northwich salt mines, then continued via Chester to Eaton Hall where he toured Earl Grosvenor's estate on horseback.

Passing through Wrexham, he reached Shrewsbury where he joined the famous Holyhead mail coach to Birmingham, then on via Worcester, Tewkesbury and Gloucester to Bristol. Here he enjoyed the Clifton Downs but had difficulty crossing the muddy and tidal River Avon below the Downs by ferry, Brunel's famous Clifton Suspension Bridge not yet having been built. In Bath Stephens paid a visit to the famous stone quarries and Pump Room, and finally returned to London by coach via Marlborough, the Savernake Forest, Henley and Windsor.

His perambulations, which took over a month, featured in a "Journal" of 14,000 words written on his return, a revised monograph of which was edited in 1997 by his great-granddaughter Jennifer Stephens, and published by The Stephens Collection in Finchley. The doctor makes acute observations on his travels through the daily life and society of England in the reign of George IV, before the advent of the railways.

== Southwark (1829–1843) and first marriage ==
The doctor established a practice at 54 Stamford Street, near Blackfriars Bridge and not far from Guy's and St Thomas' Hospitals. In September 1829, at Trinity Church, Marylebone, Stephens married Hannah Woodbridge "from Christchurch in the County of Surrey"; nothing is known of her background or how the couple met. In December 1830 a daughter, Harriot, was born, but died almost exactly a year later from consumption (tuberculosis). Worse was to follow in April 1832 when Stephens's wife Hannah also died from consumption; both mother and child were buried in the graveyard at St Mary's, Redbourn.

Despite these setbacks Stephens's medical practice flourished, and although a series of cholera outbreaks kept the doctor very busy, he found time to become an expert on hernia. His published work on this subject – A Treatise on Obstructed and Inflamed Hernia: and on Mechanical Obstructions of the Bowels Internally – appeared in 1831, the same year that his daughter died. An original copy of this work, presented to a Dr Hope "... with the author's respectful compliments", is held by the Wellcome Library in London.

During the 1830s Stephens was very active as a member of the Medical Society of London. He also became an expert on cholera which was always a problem in the city until John Snow (1813–1858), Vice-President and later President of the Society, brought the outbreaks to an end by his celebrated removal of the handle from the pump of the sewage-contaminated well in Broad Street, Soho, in 1854.

== Inventor ==
From around 1830 Stephens had been experimenting with chemicals and ink-making in the basement cellar at 54 Stamford Street, perhaps as a sort of hobby but more likely due to dissatisfaction with the poor quality of the writing materials available at that time.

Despite pressure from friends and relations to give up commerce and continue his career as a medical professional, Stephens continued experimenting with his inks and stains. As the population slowly became more literate, writing materials were much in demand, and Stephens took over a nearby stable and yard, where he kept his doctor's horse and carriage, for his factory, employing a foreman and men to handle the bottling.

In 1832 Stephens' Ink was registered as a company name. Stephens soon had an eye on exporting his products; he travelled to Paris and appointed an agent to handle his business in France, and also appointed an agent in New York. Patents were granted in 1837. The introduction of the Penny Post in 1840 helped to accelerate the demand for writing materials.

Stephens's invention is acclaimed as superior to others. A long letter published in Mechanics' Magazine, Register, Journal and Gazette dated 2 July 1836 about ink and ink stands contained the following paragraph:

"Mr Stephens' writing fluid is remarkable for the ease with which it flows from and follows every stroke of the pen, for its bright and distinct blue colour when first written with, and for the superior blackness which it afterwards invariably acquires."

signed Wm. Baddeley, London 9 June 1836

Stephens's ink is renowned for its non-fading ability and to this day Stephens's Registrar's Ink is one of the official inks that Registrars of Births, Marriages and Deaths throughout the United Kingdom are required to use for their register entries.

== Second marriage (1840) ==
In 1840, eight years after the death of Hannah, Stephens remarried. His new wife was Anne O'Reilly, a 26-year-old spinster from Holborn; the wedding took place on 3 May at St Andrew's church, Holborn. After a honeymoon in Brussels, the couple settled in their new home in York Road, Lambeth. Two children were born in the years that followed, Henry Charles in 1841 and Martha in 1843. Later on there were four more additions to the family: Harold, Catherine (Kitty), Ellen and Julian.

In 1844 Stephens published in London The Book of the Farm: Detailing the Labours of the Farmer, Farm-steward, Ploughman, Shepherd, Hedger, Cattle-man, Field-worker, and Dairy-maid, a standard work that has provided much useful information for agricultural historians, and formed the basis of a BBC Two documentary Victorian Farm in 2009.

In 1846 the doctor and his family, tired of the noise and squalor of the city, moved six miles north to the leafy village of Finchley, where they acquired a spacious home, Grove House, with outhouses and several fields adjoining Ballards Lane. The older part of the rambling house was torn down and redeveloped and there were stables for horses and a variety of other animals. In the years that followed first Martha, then Henry, were sent to school in Paris to learn French.

== Products ==
1851 was the year of the Great Exhibition in London's Hyde Park. Stephens's indelible "blue-black writing fluid" and other inks received favourable press reviews and the company's wood stains for oak, mahogany and walnut were used on the doors and panels of the Exhibition buildings. The Prince Consort, visiting early one morning, was reported to be much impressed by the results.

Later that year, Stephens' Ink company advertisements featured not only inks and wood stains but also patent propelling pencils, parallel rulers, and stamp and label dampers, and claimed patronage by Prince Albert and other European royals.

In 1852 Henry Charles, now aged eleven, returned from Paris to attend University College School in Gower Street, London, where he stayed for five years before studying chemistry at the School of Mines in Kensington. Stephens was a friend of Michael Faraday (1791–1867) and often took his young son to his lectures at the Royal Institution.

== Henry Charles Stephens ==
Around this time Stephens continued to instruct his eldest son in the preparation of inks and wood stains in his outhouses at Grove House in Finchley in a sort of apprenticeship. The experience would prove invaluable when young Henry later went to work in his father's factory. Henry Charles married, in 1863, Agnes Mackereth, the daughter of his father's old friend at medical school.

== Death ==
On 15 September 1864, Stephens, returning from his office in Aldersgate Street with Henry Charles, collapsed and died at Farringdon station. His son boarded a train believing his father was in the crowd behind him, and only learned of his missing father's death later that evening.

Stephens was mourned in London as well as in Finchley. In addition to Michael Faraday, among his personal friends were John Glover, Queen Victoria's librarian; Thomas Sopwith, geologist and mining engineer; and Sir Benjamin Ward Richardson, eminent doctor and physiologist. At his funeral it was said that although Stephens's life had been given to the service of science, he had a great yearning for literature and the arts and a great love of justice.

He was buried in St Marylebone Cemetery, Finchley, where a monument commemorates him and other members of his family. The family name is commemorated as a street name, Stephens Way, in Redbourn, Hertfordshire.

The company founded by Stephens continued for more than a century after his death. Stephens's eldest son Henry Charles Stephens (1841–1918), known to his friends as "Inky", ran the company until his death in 1918, was an entrepreneur and philanthropist and also MP for Hornsey and Finchley from 1887 until 1900.

== The Stephens Collection ==
A small museum – The Stephens Collection – in Finchley, north London, features the history of the Stephens family and the eponymous ink company, with a section on the development of writing materials. The museum is located in a new visitor centre in the former stables block at Avenue House, the home of Henry "Inky" Stephens from 1874 until his death in 1918. In his will he bequeathed Avenue House and his ten acres of gardens to the 'people of Finchley', held in trust by the Finchley Urban District Council so long as it was kept open 'for the use and enjoyment always of the people'.

The house and grounds, now known as Stephens House and Gardens, are run by the Avenue House Estate Trust, a local charity, for public benefit and as a memorial to Stephens and his son Henry Charles.
