= Avenue House =

Mansion in Finchley, London, England

Coordinates: 51.5968°N 0.1951°W

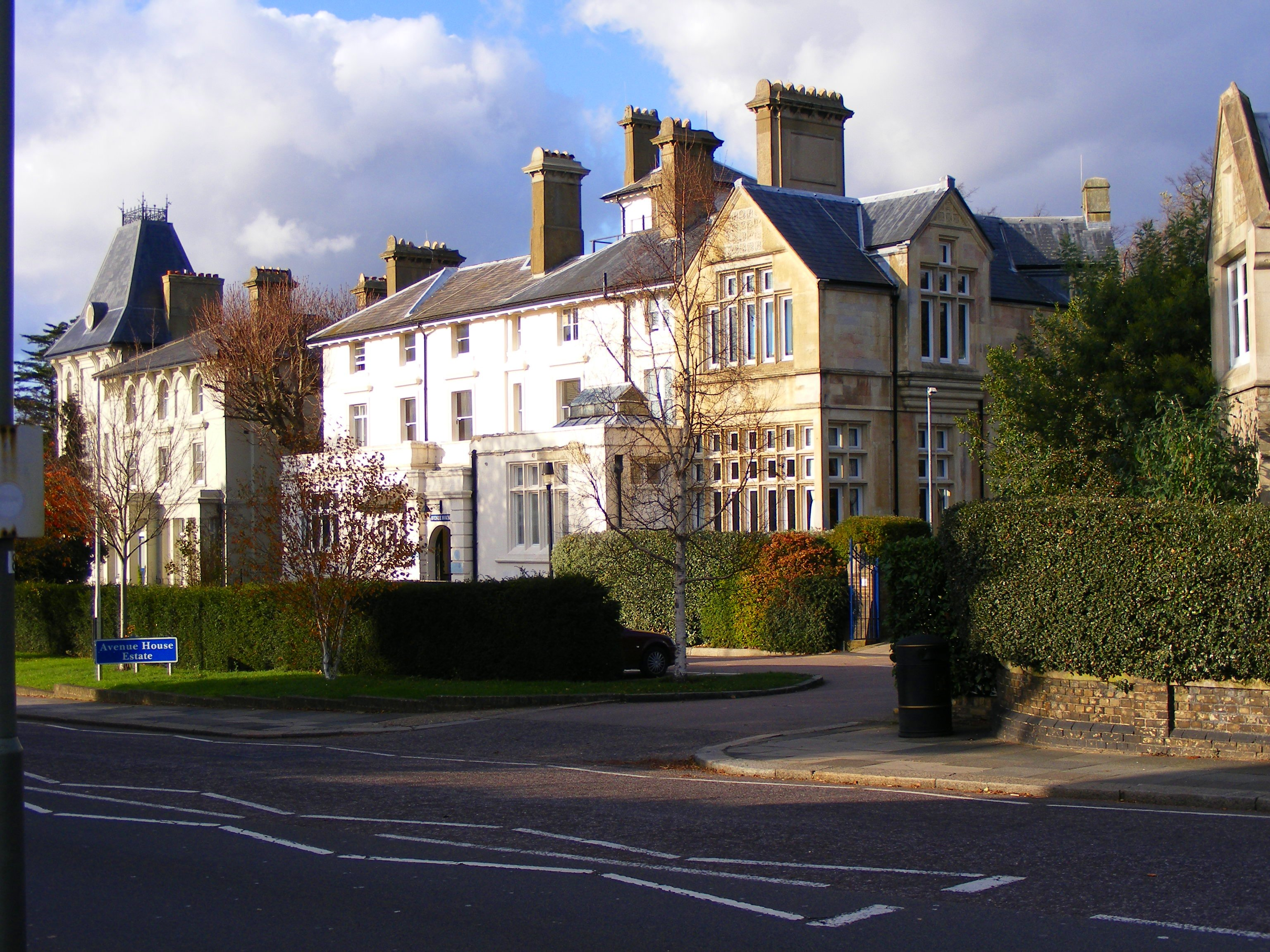
Avenue House from East End Road

Avenue House (also known as Stephens House) is a large Victorian mansion (Grade II listed) situated on East End Road in Finchley in the London Borough of Barnet.

Built in 1859 on land formerly known as Temple Croft Field, it was acquired in 1874 by ink magnate and philanthropist Henry Charles Stephens ("Inky") who later enlarged and improved the house and grounds with advice from well-known landscape gardener Robert Marnock (1800–1889).

On his death in 1918 Stephens bequeathed the estate in his will to "the Urban District Council of Finchley, subject to the condition that the same shall be open for the use and enjoyment always of the public under such reasonable regulations as may be made by the said Council from time to time for the care and upkeep thereof..." and ownership passed to Finchley Urban District Council; its freehold is now owned by a registered Charity, 'The Avenue House Estate' Charity number 210345, of which the principal trustee is the London Borough of Barnet.

The house and ten acres of grounds have been leased to the Avenue House Estate Trust, registered charity 1093908, for a period of 125 years from 2002. It is also home to the Finchley Society and their archive. Since January 2014 the estate and its commercial activities have been promoted as Stephens House and Gardens.

== History of the house ==
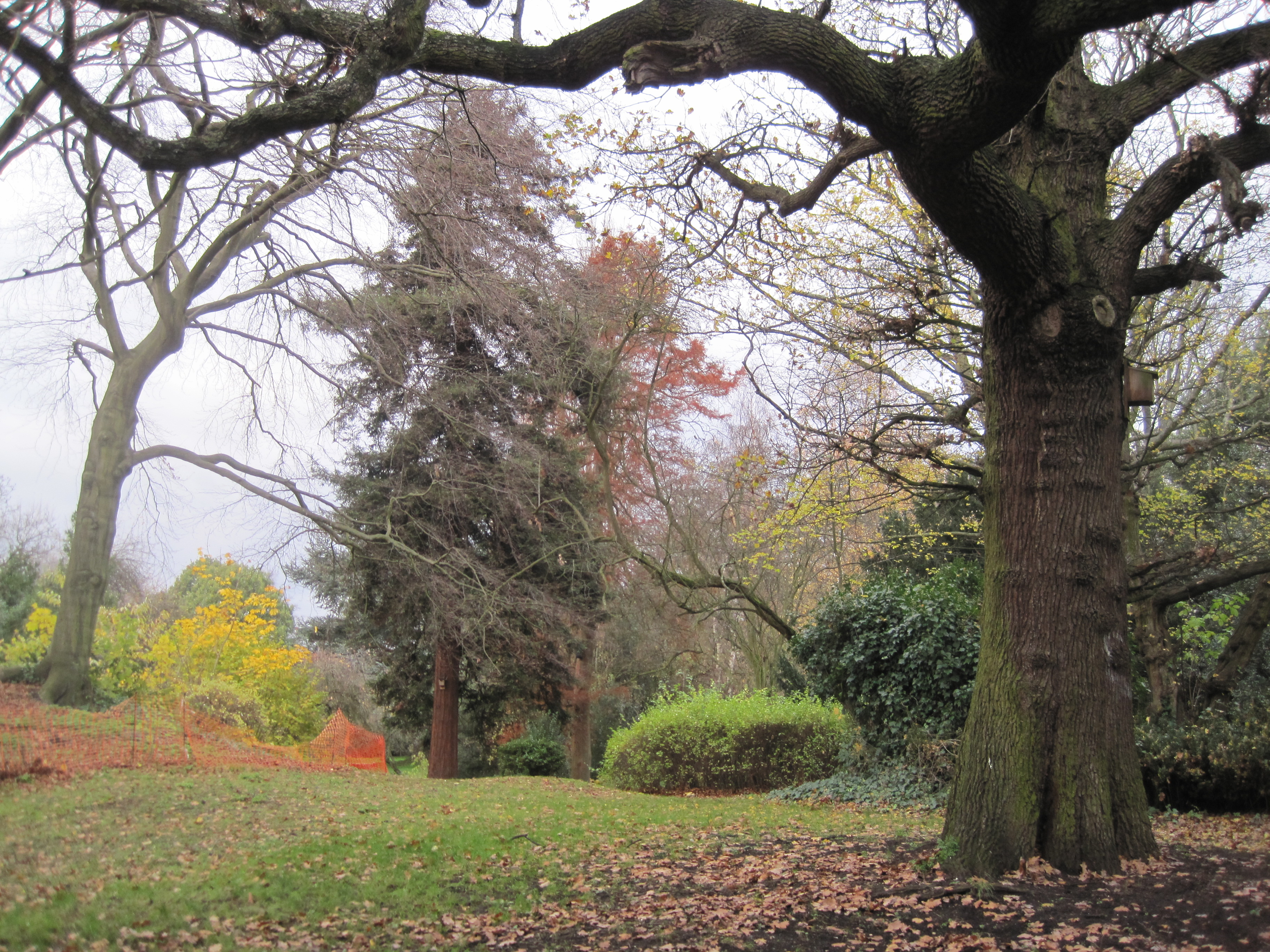
Avenue House Grounds

The house was built in 1859 by the Rev. Edward Cooper, a relative of the Allen family (Lords of the manor of Finchley) who had owned the land since the 1730s. The house takes its name from The Avenue which runs behind the house, and was originally the route between Bibbesworth manor and the church of St Mary-at-Finchley.

In 1874 the house was bought by the famous ink manufacturer Henry Charles Stephens. During Stephens' time in the house he purchased the adjoining ten-acre Temple Croft Field and the gardens were laid out to designs by Robert Marnock. Stephens added a collection of rare trees which were included in the planting and form the basis of today's arboretum.

The house and grounds were left to Finchley Urban District Council by Stephens in his will in 1918, with a condition that they be always open for the use and enjoyment of the public, subject to reasonable regulation. However, the estate was used between 1919 and 1925 by the RAF as a military hospital before the grounds were opened to the public on 3 May 1928. In 1933 the house was the location for the presenting of a charter by which the UDC became a borough. The house was used for many years as a public library and as the offices of Finchley Borough Council after council offices in nearby Hendon Lane were destroyed by enemy action in the Second World War. The basement was used as an air-raid shelter.

In 1989 the east wing of the house was gutted by fire, but it has been restored to its former condition. The house is now a meetings and events venue, while the gardens and arboretum remain open to the public free of charge. The house and gardens are now managed by an independent charitable body, the Avenue House Estate Trust, which leased the estate for 125 years in 2002.

Hertford Lodge, also a Grade II listed building and adjacent to Avenue House, was built in the 1860s. It was a girls' school for many years before becoming Finchley council offices. In 2001 the owners (London Borough of Barnet) decided to sell the building. Late in 2004 it was damaged by fire, but it was refurbished and redeveloped (2006-7) into private luxury flats and apartments.

== Gardens ==
The grounds of the estate, originally called the Avenue House Estate, but now trading as Stephens House and Gardens, were developed as a public park during the twentieth century. They cover ten acres and include a number of rare and unusual trees and shrubs. Amenities include a children's playground, a pond, a walled garden within a structure known as The Bothy, and a café.

In 2011, AHET approached the Heritage Lottery Fund and the Big Lottery about the possibility of seeking grant aid to restore the gardens under their joint 'Parks for People' programme. After preliminary approval late in 2011, a Phase 1 application in the summer of 2012 was not successful, but a further application submitted early in 2013 resulted in a grant of just over £200,000 to enable AHET to develop a full scheme towards the restoration.

AHET submitted a Phase 2 application in early 2014, and in July of that year was awarded a grant of £2.1 million towards the £3.1 million scheme. The scheme included work to improve the catering and play area, provide a new education centre and accommodation for volunteers and gardens staff, as well as restoring the gardens back to their original condition.

Work started in the spring of 2015 and was substantially completed by late 2017. The remaining funding came from the London Borough of Barnet, AHET itself (both in a financial contribution and by means of voluntary labour), and support from various individuals and other trusts, notably several Livery Companies.

In the arboretum, diseased and damaged trees have been removed and a programme of replanting is underway. The pond has been cleaned and rejuvenated; new drainage systems have improved water management. The children's playground has been improved and enlarged and the old stable and garage blocks have been modernised to contain a visitor centre, public toilets and a cafe. The Stephens Collection's museum and artefacts are now located in the visitor centre.

== The Bothy ==
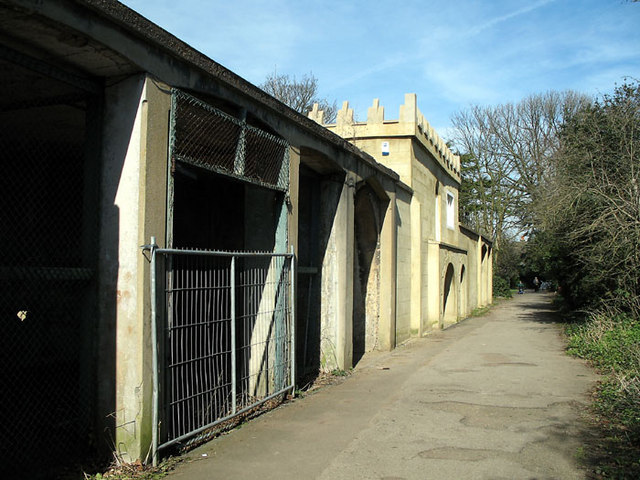
The Bothy in 2007 before restoration

The Bothy was built as a large walled garden in the shape of a small rectangular castle sometime in the late 1870s. It is one of the earliest non-Roman concrete structures in England.

A project to restore the Bothy structure and turn it into an arts centre and garden began in 1997 by the Finchley Arts Centre Trust (FACT). This was funded by local people, with money raised matched by the Heritage Lottery Fund and totalling £418,000.

The project was allegedly within weeks of completion in 2007 when an acrimonious dispute between Finchley Arts Centre Trust and Avenue House Estate Trust (AHET) broke out which prevented the building being opened to public use. Subsequently, it remained closed for about a decade. FACT was evicted and subsequently disbanded. AHET subsequently leased the Bothy to psychotherapy charity Terapia, which has converted it into a training centre, which opened partially in October 2017. The cost of completing the overhaul was some £2,000,000, which Terapia funded by a further HLF grant, and a large charitable donation. Terapia now sub-lets the Bothy from AHET on a 75-year lease.

The Bothy's walled garden is separately maintained by volunteers and has remained open to visitors every Friday and on the first Sunday of the month. In summer there are occasional arts events and play readings.

== The Stephens Collection ==
Avenue House's visitor centre is home to The Stephens Collection, a small display museum and archive of material relating to the Stephens Ink company and Stephens family and relevant local history; admission is free.

== Spike Milligan statue ==
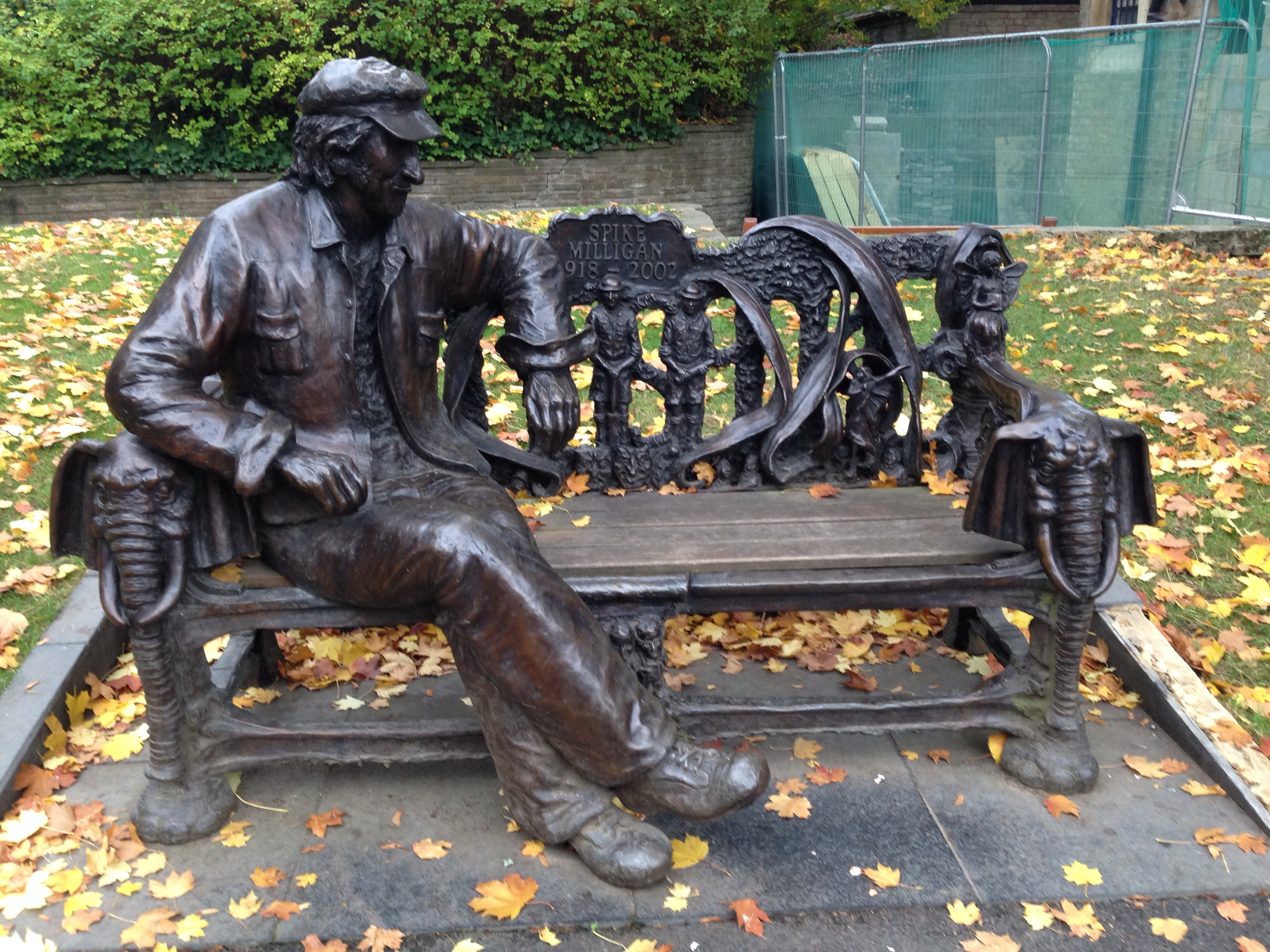
The Spike Milligan memorial bench in the garden of Avenue House in Finchley.

Spike Milligan lived locally for many years up to his death in 2002. He was the first President of the Finchley Society. For a decade after his death the Society, led by Barbara Warren, raised funds – the Spike Milligan Statue Fund – to commission a statue of Spike. This was cast in bronze to a design of local sculptor John Somerville and erected by the stables block and cafe in the grounds of Avenue House.

The statue of Spike sitting on a bench was unveiled on 4 September 2014 at a ceremony attended by a number of local dignitaries and showbusiness celebrities including Roy Hudd, Michael Parkinson, Maureen Lipman, Terry Gilliam, Kathy Lette, Denis Norden and Lynsey de Paul.

== See also ==
- Nature reserves in Barnet
