= Hempstead Watermill =

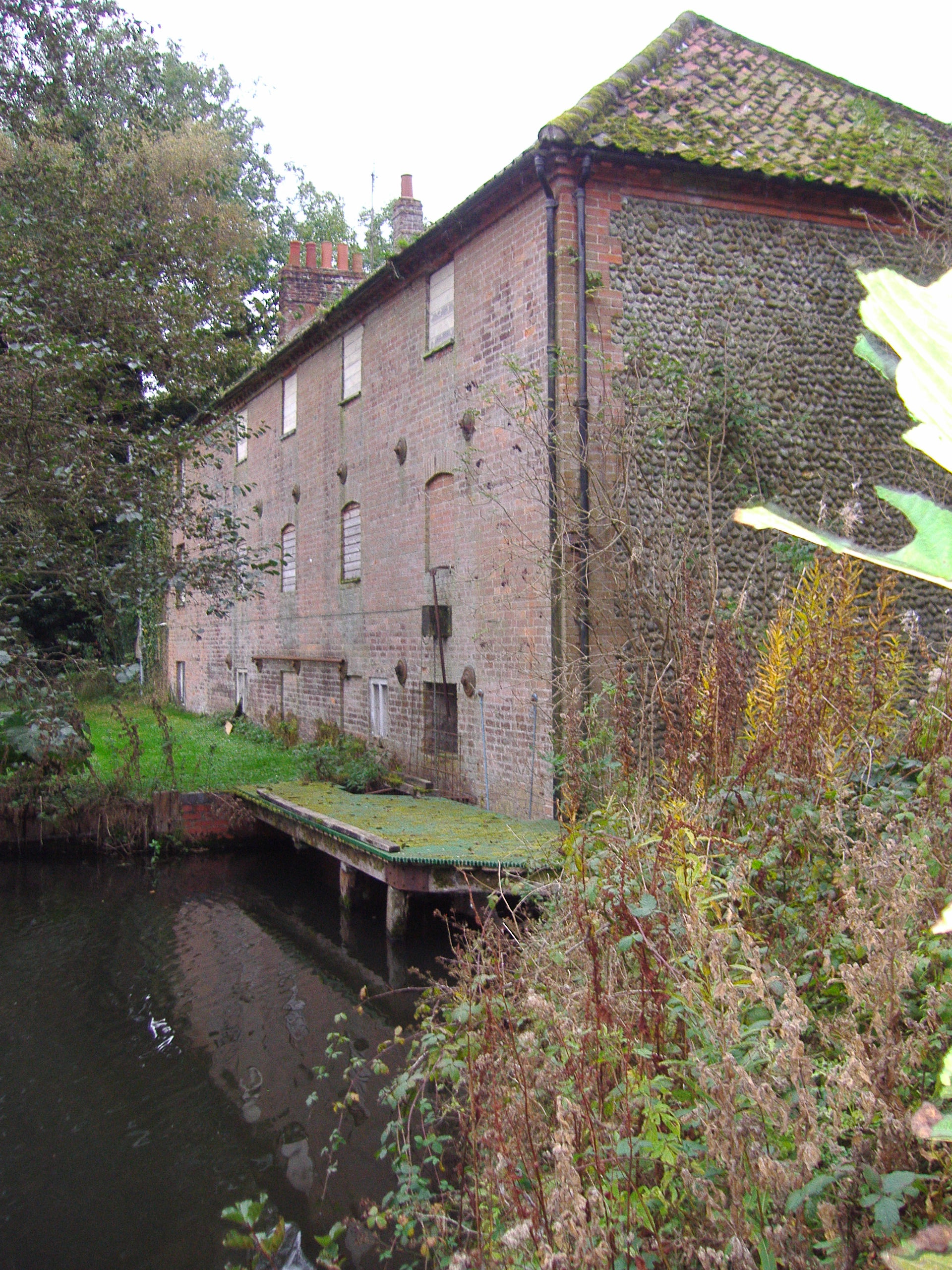
- The rear of Hempstead Watermill

- Hempstead Watermill within North Norfolk

General information
- Type: Watermill
- Location: On the River Glaven near the town of Holt, Holt, England
- Coordinates: 52.8991°N 1.1129°E
- Opened: 1830
- Owner: Richard John Gurney (1830)

Hempstead Watermill is a disused watermill 1.7 miles south east of the town of Holt in the English county of Norfolk. The mill stands on the River Glaven and the lane between Holt and the village of Hempstead. The mill was built in 1830 by Richard John Gurney and was originally called Holt Watermill.

== Description ==
The watermill and its adjoining mill house are constructed from local brick and flint and the buildings have red Norfolk pantiled roofs. The river Glaven was dammed and a large mill pond stands directly behind the mill.

== History ==
Hempstead Watermill was powered by the use of a water wheel until 1905 when the wheel was removed and replaced with a more efficient turbine. The turbine was controlled by a sluice which was also installed at the time. At the time of these changes the mill had five sources of water. They were the upper pond which was swept away in floods in 1912, Old Decoy now called Selbrigg Pond, New Decoy and Horsepit Pond. This last pond was originally the farm horse pond for near-by Red House Farm, the pond was supplemented with water that was runoff from the farm and its buildings. A sluice had been added to the pond in order to increase the water in the mill pond. Even then the mill only had enough water to run for a limit of five hours. In later years a traction engine ran the mill via a pulley wheel on the outside of the building. The watermill operated two pairs of stones, although most of the time, only one pair would be working due to lack of water. A circular timber saw blade set in a steel bench was also powered from the Turbine and was still in operation up until 1977. It was used to cut timber for the Gurney Estate. The shed that sheltered the bench has long disappeared. The watermill also included a number of cartsheds, haylofts, stables, pig sties and cowsheds.

== Bakery ==
In 1911 a bakery was added to the set of buildings. The bread oven had been supplied by T. Collins & Co of Bristol. The oven was fired using coke, as was the twenty gallon capacity boiler that supplied hot water and regulated the oven. The oven had a capacity to produce 208 1-lb loaves and was fired up twice before deliveries went out to the surrounding population. Water for the bread making was carried by bucket from a spring on the opposite side of the road.
