= Hunworth =

Village in Norfolk, England

Coordinates: 52.87742°N 1.06889°E

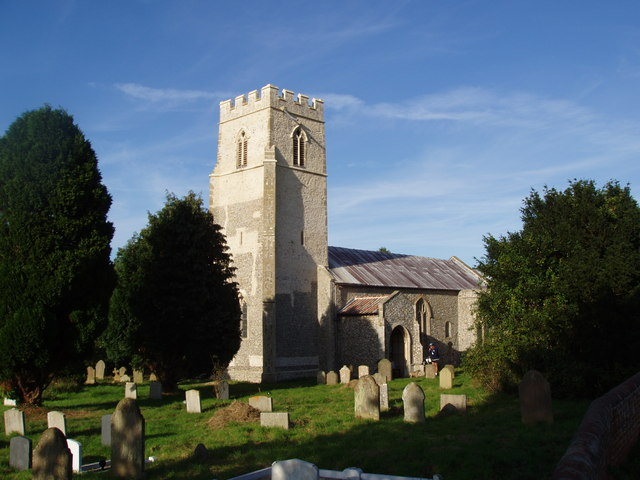
- St. Lawrence's Church

- Location within Norfolk
- OS grid reference: TG0635
- Civil parish: Stody
- District: North Norfolk
- Shire county: Norfolk
- Region: East
- Country: England
- Sovereign state: United Kingdom
- Post town: HOLT
- Postcode district: NR25
- Dialling code: 01263
- UK Parliament: North Norfolk

Hunworth is a village and former civil parish, now in the parish of Stody, in the North Norfolk district, in the English county of Norfolk.

Hunworth is located 11.5 miles (18.5 km) east-north-east of the town of Fakenham and 20 miles (32 km) north-west of Norwich.

== History ==
Hunworth's name is of Anglo-Saxon origin and derives from the Old English for Huna's enclosure.

In the Domesday Book, Hunworth is listed as a settlement of 11 households in the hundred of Holt. In 1086, the village was divided between the East Anglian estates of King William I, Count Alan of Brittany and Walter Giffard.

A motte-and-bailey castle was built in Hunworth after the Norman Conquest of which only earthworks remain.

Hunworth Hall was built 1699 for Edmund Britliffe, a courtier to King William III.

Hunworth Watermill was built in 1815 on the River Glaven, though it was built on the site of a mill that had stood since Anglo-Saxon times. The mill was badly flooded in 2023, though it is still apparently in working order.

== Geography ==
The River Glaven runs through the village.

== St. Lawrence's Church ==
Hunworth's church is dedicated to Saint Lawrence and dates from the Twelfth Century. St. Lawrence's is located on Stody Road and has been Grade II listed since 1987. The church holds occasional Sunday service.

St. Lawrence's was gradually expanded throughout the medieval period and was restored during the Victorian era. The church holds a memorial to Edmund Britliffe, the builder of Hunworth Hall.

== Governance ==
Hunworth is part of the electoral ward of Stody for local elections and is part of the district of North Norfolk.

The village's national constituency is North Norfolk, which has been represented by the Liberal Democrat Steff Aquarone MP since 2024.

On 1 April 1935 the parish was abolished and merged with Stody. In 1931 the parish had a population of 173.

== War Memorial ==
Hunworth's war memorial is a framed plaque inside St. Lawrence's Church which lists the following names for the First World War:

Rank	Name	Unit	Date of death	Burial/Commemoration
Sjt.	Robert S. Ironside DCM	120th Bty., Royal Field Artillery	9 Nov. 1914	Bailleul Cemetery
Pte.	Herbert C. Buckle	MA Depot, Army Service Corps	30 Aug. 1916	Hadra War Cemetery
Pte.	George W. Buckle	4th Bn., Norfolk Regiment	19 Apr. 1917	Gaza War Cemetery
Pte.	George Williamson	4th Bn., Norfolk Regt.	11 Dec. 1917	Ramleh War Cemetery
Pte.	Horace Rudd	8th Bn., Norfolk Regt.	19 Jul. 1916	Thiepval Memorial
Pte.	William G. Peck	1st Bn., York and Lancaster Regt.	23 Aug. 1915	Westouter Churchyard

== Gallery ==
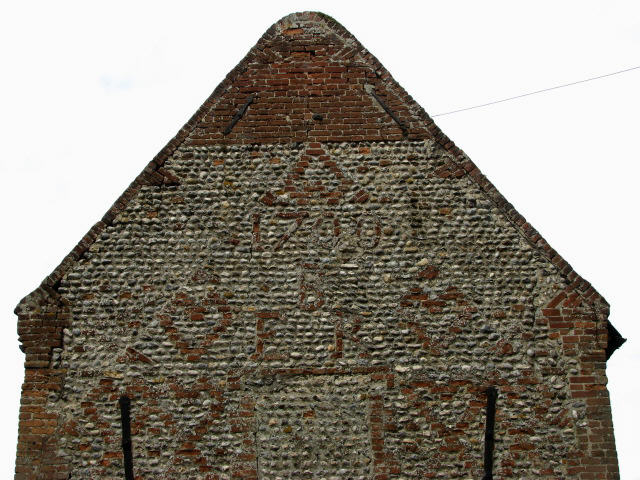
Gable end of the old Barn on King Street with Edmund Britliffe's initials in the wall

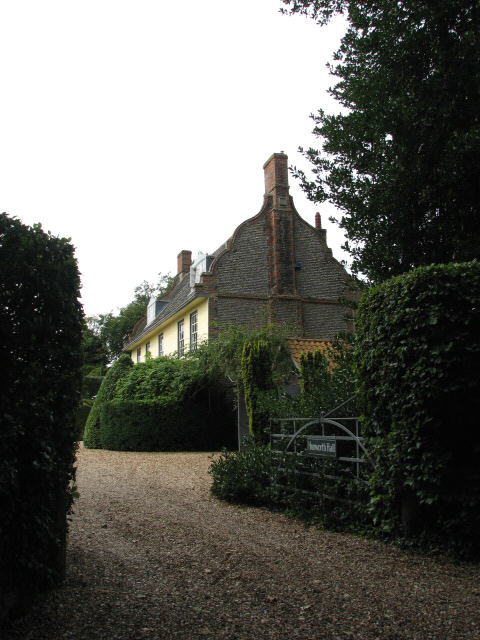
Hunworth Hall

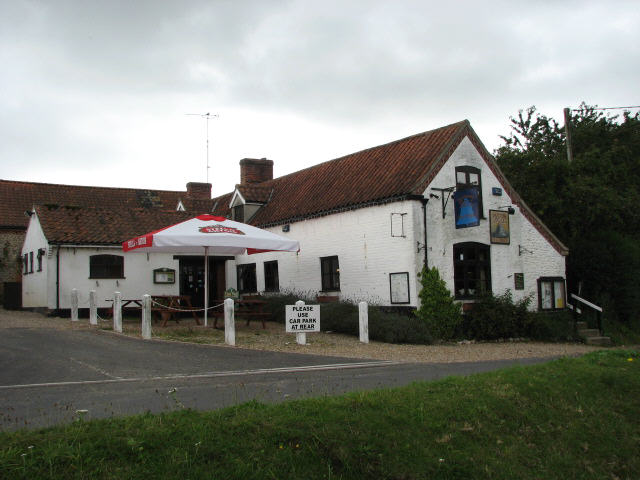
The Bell public house stands on the village green
