= Glandford Watermill =

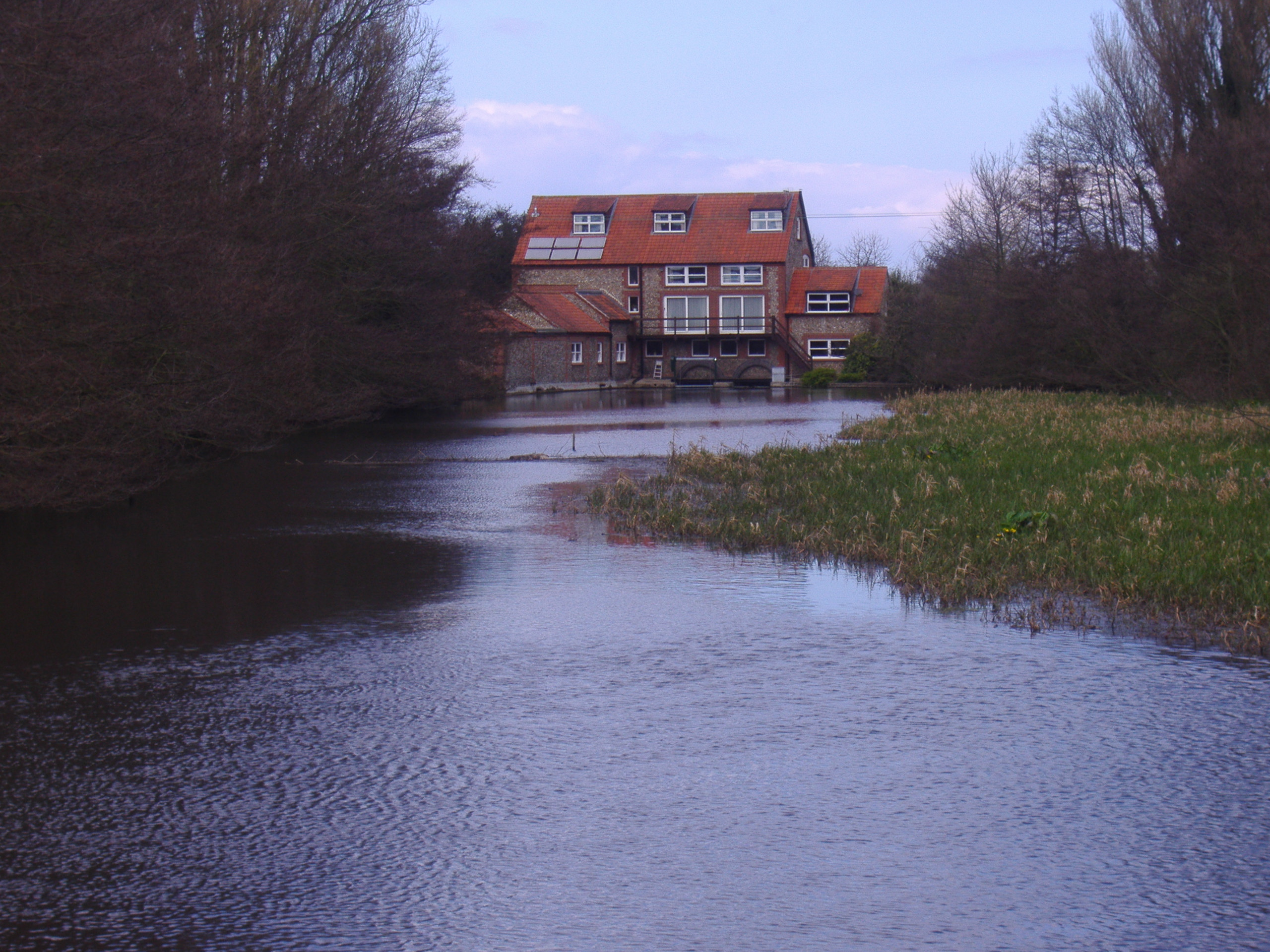
- Glanford Watermill, south elevation

- Glandford Watermill within North Norfolk

General information
- Type: Watermill
- Location: River Glaven, Glandford, England
- Coordinates: 52.9332°N 1.0406°E
- Opened: Present mill 1907

Technical details
- Material: Brick and Flint, Pantile Roof

Glandford watermill is situated on the River Glaven a little north of the village of Glandford within the English county of Norfolk. Glandford is in the civil parish of Wiveton within the district of North Norfolk.

== Description ==
This watermill was built in 1907 but there had been a mill here long before this date. The map produced by Faden's in 1797 records a mill at "Glanford" on the river Glaven. The present mill is constructed with Norfolk red brick and flints that had been taken from a local gravel pit on the eastern side of the Glaven valley above Glandford. The roof is of Norfolk red pantiles. The mill stands over three story plus a loft. The mill pond is situated to the south of the mill.

== History ==
The first recorded miller at Glandford was William Cook in 1819. A letter written by him in 1824 records that the tides running up the Glaven from the nearby coast would pass through the water wheel into the mill dam beyond. This happened virtually daily until 1823, and in earlier times it is probable that in times of high tides, sea water came in as far as Bayfield. When the present mill was first built in 1907, it was owned by Sir Alfred Jodrell who lived at Bayfield Hall. He is recorded as keeping the watermill well maintained. The mill finally ceased operation some time around the Second World War. In 1969 the mill was sold, and by then the waterwheel had been removed. The mill building was used as a farm store. The watermill has since been converted into a residence and in 1971 was also used in the running of a fish-farming business.
