= Glandford (Hurdle Lane) =

Protected area in Norfolk, England

Coordinates: 52.932°N 1.053°E

- Site of Special Scientific Interest
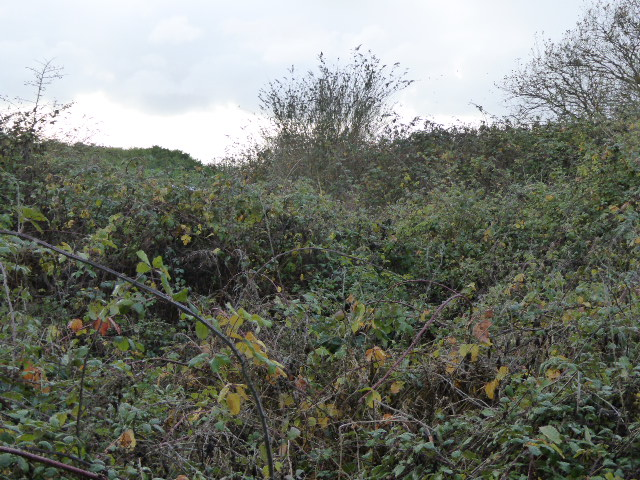
- Location of Glandford (Hurdle Lane).
- Area of search: Norfolk, England
- Grid reference: TG 053 415
- Interest: Geological
- Area: 9.4 hectares (23 acres)
- Notification date: 1992
- Location map: Magic Map

Glandford (Hurdle Lane) is a 9.4-hectare (23-acre) geological Site of Special Scientific Interest west of Sheringham in Norfolk, England. It is a Geological Conservation Review site and it is in the Norfolk Coast Area of Outstanding Natural Beauty.

This is a working quarry in the valley of the River Glaven. It has a complex sequence of deposits formed by Pleistocene glaciers, with till, lacustrine calcareous silts, sands and coarse gravels, which throw light on the glacial history of the area.

The site is private land with no public access.
