= 2023 North Norfolk District Council election =

- 4 May 2023

All 40 seats to North Norfolk District Council 21 seats needed for a majority

	First party	Second party	Third party
Leader	Tim Adams	Christopher Cushing	John Rest
Party	Liberal Democrats	Conservative	Independent
Last election	30 seats, 48.8%	6 seats, 32.5%	4 seats, 7.3%
Seats before	24	10	6
Seats after	25	12	3
Seat change	▼5	▲6	▼1
Popular vote	14,366	11,937	1,455
Percentage	43.0%	35.8%	8.0%
Swing	▼5.8%	▲3.3%	▼3.6%
- Winner of each seat
Leader before election
Tim Adams
Liberal Democrats
Leader after election
Tim Adams
Liberal Democrats

The 2023 North Norfolk District Council election took place on 4 May 2023 to elect members of North Norfolk District Council in Norfolk, England. This was on the same day as other local elections across England.

== Summary ==
The elections saw the Liberal Democrats retain their majority on the council.

=== Election result ===
The overall results were:

2023 North Norfolk District Council election
Party	Candidates	Seats	Gains	Losses	Net gain/loss	Seats %	Votes %	Votes	+/−
Liberal Democrats	37	25	1	6	▼5	62.5	43.0	14,366	-5.8
Conservative	40	12	7	1	▲6	30.0	35.8	11,937	+3.3
Independent	8	3	0	1	▼1	7.5	4.4	1,455	-3.6
Labour	34	0	0	0	Steady	0.0	10.1	3,384	+3.6
Green	18	0	0	0	Steady	0.0	6.2	2,059	+2.0
Reform	2	0	0	0	Steady	0.0	0.5	178	N/A

== Ward results ==
The Statement of Persons Nominated, which details the candidates standing in each ward, was released by North Norfolk District Council on 5 April 2023. The results for each ward were as follows, with an asterisk (*) indicating an incumbent councillor standing for re-election.

=== Bacton ===
Bacton
Party	Candidate	Votes	%	±%
Conservative	Pauline Porter	307	46.1	+22.3
Liberal Democrats	Andrew Fletcher	253	38.0	−7.1
Labour	Mat Armitage	91	13.7	+6.3
Majority		54	8.1	
Turnout		666	32.9	
Conservative gain from Liberal Democrats		Swing		

=== Beeston Regis and The Runtons ===
Beeston Regis and The Runtons
Party	Candidate	Votes	%	±%
Liberal Democrats	Kim Toye	460	44.5	−18.4
Conservative	Rebecca Hill	365	35.3	+1.9
Green	Neil Adams	92	8.9	N/A
Labour	Emma Lane	61	5.9	+2.3
Reform	Russell Wright	51	4.9	N/A
Majority		95	9.8	
Turnout		1,034	47.9	
Liberal Democrats hold		Swing		

=== Briston ===
Briston
Party	Candidate	Votes	%	±%
Liberal Democrats	Emma Coleman	366	51.1	−6.4
Conservative	Jolanda Stenton*	288	40.2	−17.3
Labour	Bill O'Connor	56	7.8	+3.6
Majority		78	10.9	
Turnout		716	35.0	
Liberal Democrats hold		Swing		

Jolanda Stenton had previously been elected as a Liberal Democrat councillor.

=== Coastal ===
Coastal
Party	Candidate	Votes	%	±%
Conservative	Victoria Holliday*	619	59.0	+29.7
Liberal Democrats	David Allison	340	32.4	−33.8
Labour	Will Gee	86	8.2	+3.7
Majority		279	26.6	
Turnout		1,049	53.4	
Conservative gain from Liberal Democrats		Swing		

=== Cromer Town ===
Cromer Town (2 seats)
Party	Candidate	Votes	%	±%
Liberal Democrats	Tim Adams*	1,120	67.3	+6.2
Liberal Democrats	Jill Boyle	804	48.3	−10.2
Conservative	Hilary Cox	516	31.0	+8.4
Conservative	Stephen Scott-Fawcett	310	18.6	−2.4
Green	Mike Bossingham	180	10.8	−2.6
Labour	Jenni Randall	116	7.0	+0.1
Labour	Jenny Tabecki	79	4.7	−1.2
Majority		288	17.3	
Turnout		1,664	41.4	
Liberal Democrats hold		Swing		
Liberal Democrats hold		Swing		

=== Erpingham ===
Erpingham
Party	Candidate	Votes	%	±%
Liberal Democrats	John Toye*	568	54.9	+20.3
Conservative	Jennifer English	254	24.6	−3.4
Green	Stephen Green	145	14.0	+2.5
Labour	Timothy Bartlett	61	5.9	−1.3
Majority		314	30.4	
Turnout		1,034	47.4	
Liberal Democrats hold		Swing		

=== Gresham ===
Gresham
Party	Candidate	Votes	%	±%
Liberal Democrats	Callum Ringer	495	55.2	+29.1
Conservative	Charles Mack	331	36.9	+10.9
Green	Alicia Hull	41	4.6	N/A
Labour	Ruth Bartlett	29	3.2	−0.9
Majority		164	18.3	
Turnout		897	46.1	
Liberal Democrats hold		Swing		

=== Happisburgh ===
Happisburgh
Party	Candidate	Votes	%	±%
Conservative	Luke Paterson	332	39.7	+9.5
Liberal Democrats	Steven Stockton	273	33.6	−14.9
Green	Elizabeth Dixon	107	13.2	+1.8
Labour	Bryony Nierop-Reading	105	12.9	+3.0
Majority		59	6.1	
Turnout		813	38.5	
Conservative gain from Liberal Democrats		Swing		

=== Hickling ===
Hickling
Party	Candidate	Votes	%	±%
Liberal Democrats	Harry Blathwayt*	475	55.8	+3.5
Conservative	Richard Price	307	36.0	+11.9
Labour	Bryonie Jones	62	7.3	+3.4
Majority		168	19.7	
Turnout		852	40.0	
Liberal Democrats hold		Swing		

=== Holt ===
Holt (2 seats)
Party	Candidate	Votes	%	±%
Liberal Democrats	Martin Batey	874	49.0	+0.9
Conservative	Eric Vardy*	702	39.3	−11.4
Conservative	Jonny Perry-Warnes	657	36.8	+4.1
Liberal Democrats	Paul Welsh	381	21.4	−25.8
Green	Simon Russell	286	16.0	N/A
Independent	Maggie Prior	253	14.2	−18.5
Labour	Fiona Hayward	133	7.5	N/A
Majority		45	2.5	
Turnout		1,784	45.6	
Liberal Democrats hold		Swing		
Conservative hold		Swing		

=== Hoveton and Tunstead ===
Hoveton and Tunstead (2 seats)
Party	Candidate	Votes	%	±%
Conservative	Nigel Dixon*	819	49.9	−9.0
Conservative	Gerard Mancini-Boyle*	634	38.6	−8.3
Liberal Democrats	Callum Hoy	423	25.8	−11.5
Liberal Democrats	Judeline Nicholas	412	25.1	−4.0
Labour	Clive Sellick	312	19.0	+9.9
Labour	Richard Stowe	277	16.9	N/A
Reform	Jason Patchett	127	7.7	N/A
Majority		211	12.8	
Turnout		1,642	37.8	
Conservative hold		Swing		
Conservative hold		Swing		

=== Lancaster North ===
Lancaster North
Party	Candidate	Votes	%	±%
Conservative	Christopher Cushing*	306	48.9	−6.7
Independent	Annie Claussen-Reynolds	155	24.8	N/A
Labour Co-op	Sue Brisbane	109	17.4	N/A
Green	Tasha Southerland	54	8.6	N/A
Majority		151	24.1	
Turnout		626	30.4	
Conservative hold		Swing		

=== Lancaster South ===
Lancaster South (2 seats)
Party	Candidate	Votes	%	±%
Conservative	Liz Vickers	466	39.8	+0.8
Independent	Jeremy Punchard*	376	32.1	−17.4
Independent	John Rest*	372	31.7	−8.9
Green	Kris Marshall-Smith	334	28.5	N/A
Conservative	Talon Fast	321	27.4	−8.6
Labour	Tony Pope	280	23.9	+5.4
Majority		4	0.4	
Turnout		1,172	27.3	
Conservative gain from Independent		Swing		
Independent hold		Swing		

=== Mundesley ===
Mundesley
Party	Candidate	Votes	%	±%
Liberal Democrats	Wendy Fredericks*	682	68.4	+8.5
Conservative	Derek Smith	251	25.2	−6.1
Labour	Ruth Smith	63	6.3	N/A
Majority		431	43.2	
Turnout		997	46.0	
Liberal Democrats hold		Swing		

=== North Walsham East ===
North Walsham East (2 seats)
Party	Candidate	Votes	%	±%
Liberal Democrats	Garry Bull	656	58.6	−7.7
Liberal Democrats	Paul Heinrich*	613	54.8	−4.7
Conservative	Tracey Ginbey	347	31.0	+9.3
Conservative	Nick Lee	308	27.5	+8.3
Labour	David Marten	121	10.8	−1.3
Majority		266	23.8	
Turnout		1,119	30.2	
Liberal Democrats hold		Swing		
Liberal Democrats hold		Swing		

=== North Walsham Market Cross ===
North Walsham Market Cross
Party	Candidate	Votes	%	±%
Liberal Democrats	Richard Sims	427	49.9	−14.0
Conservative	Paul East	318	37.1	+8.8
Labour	Rebecca Shaw	103	12.0	+4.2
Majority		109	12.7	
Turnout		856	39.2	
Liberal Democrats hold		Swing		

=== North Walsham West ===
North Waltham West (2 seats)
Party	Candidate	Votes	%	±%
Liberal Democrats	Lucy Shires**	803	60.8	+5.8
Liberal Democrats	Donald Birch*	769	58.2	+2.4
Conservative	Rob Scammell	351	26.6	+11.9
Conservative	Ferdi Reis	285	21.6	+7.7
Labour	Julia Cavanagh	207	15.7	+5.7
Majority		418	31.6	
Turnout		1,321	30.6	
Liberal Democrats hold		Swing		
Liberal Democrats hold		Swing		

Lucy Shires was a sitting councillor for Happisburgh ward.

=== Poppyland ===
Poppyland
Party	Candidate	Votes	%	±%
Independent	Angela Fitch-Tillett*	324	40.1	+6.9
Liberal Democrats	Rex Parfitt	196	24.3	+0.8
Conservative	Crispian Riley-Smith	168	20.8	−0.1
Green	Melissa Sargent	61	7.5	−10.9
Labour	Steven Moore	57	7.1	+3.1
Majority		128	15.8	
Turnout		808	39.8	
Independent hold		Swing		

=== Priory ===
Priory
Party	Candidate	Votes	%	±%
Liberal Democrats	Sarah Butikofer**	371	45.5	+6.2
Conservative	Steve Dye	351	43.1	+14.6
Labour	Jacqueline Moore	92	11.3	+5.7
Majority		20	2.4	
Turnout		815	42.1	
Liberal Democrats hold		Swing		

Sarah Butikofer was a sitting councillor for Beeston Regis and The Runtons ward.

=== Roughton ===
Roughton
Party	Candidate	Votes	%	±%
Liberal Democrats	Roy MacDonald	338	43.8	−10.4
Conservative	Tim Blyth	268	34.8	−11.0
Green	Clare Wilson	65	8.4	N/A
Independent	Nick Coppack	51	6.6	N/A
Labour	David Russell	47	6.1	N/A
Majority		70	9.1	
Turnout		771	33.9	
Liberal Democrats hold		Swing		

=== Sheringham North ===
Sheringham North
Party	Candidate	Votes	%	±%
Liberal Democrats	Liz Withington*	403	50.1	−13.3
Conservative	Cliff Morris	322	40.0	+14.9
Labour	Martin Langsdon	79	9.8	−1.6
Majority		81	10.1	
Turnout		805	42.2	
Liberal Democrats hold		Swing		

=== Sheringham South ===
Sheringham South (2 seats)
Party	Candidate	Votes	%	±%
Liberal Democrats	Philip Bailey	928	50.5	+0.3
Liberal Democrats	Colin Heinink*	869	47.3	−3.0
Conservative	Judy Oliver	718	39.1	−1.9
Conservative	Michelle Allard	711	38.7	−1.8
Green	Sue Brocklehurst	158	8.6	N/A
Labour	Tom Smith	129	7.0	+1.3
Majority		151	8.2	
Turnout		1,838	44.1	
Liberal Democrats hold		Swing		
Liberal Democrats hold		Swing		

=== St Benet ===
St Benet
Party	Candidate	Votes	%	±%
Liberal Democrats	Adam Varley*	536	58.8	−7.5
Conservative	Tony Lumbard	312	34.2	+4.3
Labour	Mike Lowenstein	57	6.3	+2.6
Majority		224	24.6	
Turnout		912	45.3	
Liberal Democrats hold		Swing		

=== Stalham ===
Stalham (2 seats)
Party	Candidate	Votes	%	±%
Conservative	Matthew Taylor*	693	48.0	+15.8
Conservative	Kevin Bayes	650	45.0	+17.5
Liberal Democrats	Pauline Grove-Jones*	515	35.7	−17.2
Liberal Democrats	Stephen Lennane	295	20.4	−30.5
Labour	Jacqui Cross	206	14.3	+5.5
Green	Michael Macartney-Filgate	205	14.2	−1.9
Majority		135	9.4	
Turnout		1,443	32.2	
Conservative gain from Liberal Democrats		Swing		
Conservative gain from Liberal Democrats		Swing		

=== Stibbard ===
Stibbard
Party	Candidate	Votes	%	±%
Liberal Democrats	Mike Hankins	393	41.0	+7.8
Conservative	Helena Parker-Wright	341	35.6	−5.3
Green	Barbara Wyvill	124	12.9	−13.1
Labour	Duncan Pearson	93	9.7	N/A
Majority		52	5.4	
Turnout		958	43.8	
Liberal Democrats gain from Conservative		Swing		

=== Stody ===
Stody
Party	Candidate	Votes	%	±%
Liberal Democrats	Andrew Brown*	491	58.5	−10.4
Conservative	Mark Cook	285	33.9	+9.4
Labour	Martyn Sloman	61	7.3	+0.6
Majority		206	24.5	
Turnout		840	42.8	
Liberal Democrats hold		Swing		

=== Suffield Park ===
Suffield Park
Party	Candidate	Votes	%	±%
Liberal Democrats	Emma Spagnola*	517	60.9	+1.6
Conservative	Nigel Pearce**	220	25.9	−5.2
Labour	David Batley	62	7.3	−2.3
Green	Paul Sutcliff	47	5.5	N/A
Majority		297	35.0	
Turnout		849	39.3	
Liberal Democrats hold		Swing		

Nigel Pearce was a sitting councillor for Roughton ward, and had previously been elected as a Liberal Democrat councillor.

=== The Raynhams ===
The Raynhams
Party	Candidate	Votes	%	±%
Independent	Nigel Housden*	196	32.1	−10.5
Conservative	Julia Marozzi	145	23.7	−15.3
Independent	Vincent Fitzpatrick**	100	16.4	N/A
Labour	Christopher Rowe	81	13.3	N/A
Liberal Democrats	Evie-May Ellis	49	8.0	−10.4
Green	Ritchie Tennant	40	6.5	N/A
Majority		51	8.3	
Turnout		611	28.7	
Independent hold		Swing		

Vincent Fitzpatrick was a sitting councillor for Stibbard ward, and had previously been elected as a Conservative Party councillor.

=== Trunch ===
Trunch
Party	Candidate	Votes	%	±%
Conservative	Peter Neatherway	398	41.1	+14.0
Liberal Democrats	Nicola Page	382	39.4	−12.6
Labour	Graham Jones	115	11.9	+5.6
Green	Peter Crouch	61	6.3	−8.3
Majority		16	1.7	
Turnout		969	44.8	
Conservative gain from Liberal Democrats		Swing		

=== Walsingham ===
Walsingham
Party	Candidate	Votes	%	±%
Conservative	Tom Fitzpatrick*	432	59.3	+7.0
Liberal Democrats	Ashley Perks	174	23.9	+6.4
Labour	Adam Coombes	111	15.2	N/A
Majority		258	35.4	
Turnout		729	35.5	
Conservative hold		Swing		

=== Wells with Holkham ===
Wells with Holkham
Party	Candidate	Votes	%	±%
Liberal Democrats	Peter Fisher*	357	48.2	+4.8
Conservative	Michael Dalby	236	31.9	+3.4
Labour Co-op	Phil Harris	138	18.6	−9.4
Majority		121	16.4	
Turnout		740	40.0	
Liberal Democrats hold		Swing		

=== Worstead ===
Worstead
Party	Candidate	Votes	%	±%
Liberal Democrats	Saul Penfold*	501	63.2	−8.0
Conservative	Christopher Oakes	169	21.3	+4.2
Labour	John Alcock	61	7.7	+2.4
Green	Diane Wiles	59	7.4	+0.9
Majority		332	41.9	
Turnout		793	38.2	
Liberal Democrats hold		Swing		

== Post-election changes ==
=== By-elections ===
==== Briston ====
Briston by-election: 7 November 2023
Party	Candidate	Votes	%	±%
Liberal Democrats	Andrew Fletcher	342	49.2	−1.9
Conservative	Jolanda Stenton	274	39.4	−0.8
Green	James Whitehouse	64	9.2	N/A
Labour	Philip Harris	15	2.2	−5.7
Majority		68	9.8	
Turnout		695	33.6	
Liberal Democrats hold		Swing		

==== North Walsham East ====
North Walsham East by-election: 4 July 2024
Party	Candidate	Votes	%	±%
Liberal Democrats	Kate Leith	959	45.7	−12.9
Conservative	Tracey Ginbey	717	34.2	+3.2
Labour	David Russell	236	11.2	+0.4
Green	Mike Bossingham	186	8.9	N/A
Majority		242	11.5	
Turnout		2,098	56.2	
Liberal Democrats hold		Swing		

==== North Walsham Market Cross ====
North Walsham Market Cross by-election: 12 September 2024
Party	Candidate	Votes	%	±%
Liberal Democrats	Malcolm Gray	283	46.5	−3.3
Conservative	Tracey Ginbey	239	39.3	+2.2
Green	Elizabeth Dixon	53	8.7	N/A
Labour	Rebecca Shaw	33	5.43	−6.6
Majority		44	7.2	
Turnout		608	27.6	
Liberal Democrats hold		Swing		

==== Holt ====
Holt by-election: 1 May 2025
Party	Candidate	Votes	%	±%
Liberal Democrats	Connor Rouse	774	41.8	+20.4
Conservative	Alex Savva	536	29.0	−10.3
Reform	Beverley Seaward	441	23.8	N/A
Green	Simon Russell	73	3.9	−12.1
Labour	Fiona Hayward	27	1.5	−6.0
Majority		238	12.9	
Turnout		1,853	46.0	
Liberal Democrats gain from Conservative		Swing		

==== Suffield Park ====
Suffield Park by-election: 9 July 2026 Resignation of Emma Tooke (Liberal Democrats)
Party	Candidate	Votes	%	±%
Liberal Democrats	Tyler Wragg	485	65.4	+4.5
Reform	Benjamin Miles	136	18.3	N/A
Conservative	John Lee	88	11.9	−14.0
Green	Paul Sutcliff	20	2.7	−2.8
Labour	David Russell	13	1.8	−5.5
Majority		349	47.1	+12.1
Turnout		742	35.4	−3.9
Registered electors		2,096		
Liberal Democrats hold				
