= River Glaven =

River in Norfolk, England

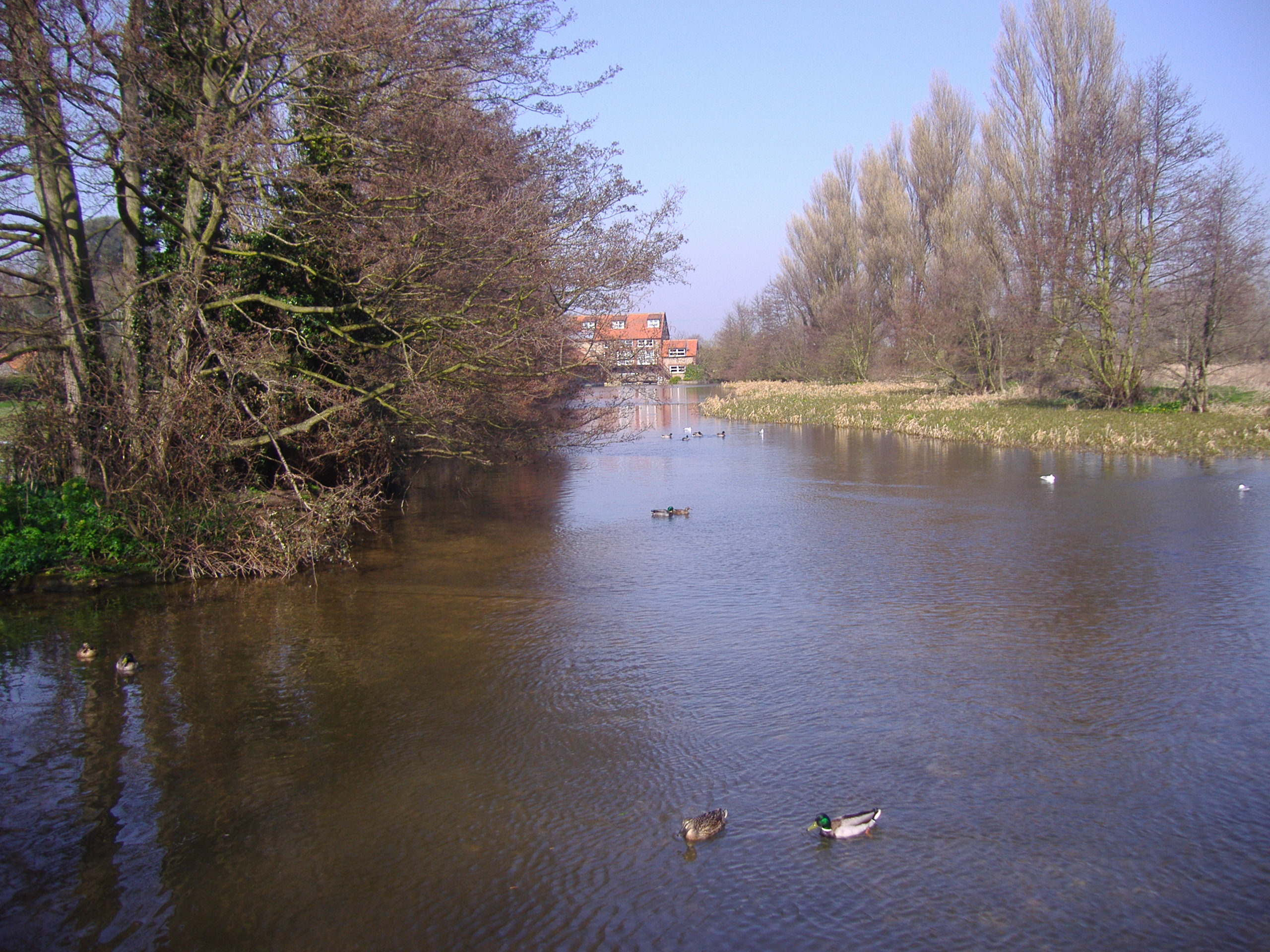
- River Glaven at Glandford

- Location within Norfolk

Location
- Country: England
- State: Norfolk
- Region: East of England
- District: North Norfolk

Physical characteristics
- Source: Lower Bodham
  - location: Bodham, North Norfolk, England
  - coordinates: 52°54′57″N 1°9′45″E
- Mouth
  - location: North Sea at Blakeney Point, England
  - coordinates: 52°58′12″N 01°00′27″E
  - elevation: 0 m (0 ft)
- Length: 17 km (11 mi)

Basin features
- Tributaries
  - left: Stody Beck, Thornage Beck

The River Glaven in the eastern English county of Norfolk is a 10.5 mi (16.9 km) long chalk river which flows through the North Norfolk countryside to the North Sea. Rising from a tiny headwater in Lower Bodham the river starts 2 1/2 miles before Selbrigg Pond where three small streams combine. The scenic value of the Glaven valley is important to the tourist industry in North Norfolk. The river is one of over 200 chalk rivers in the world and one of 160 in the UK.

== Geography ==
The river has a catchment area of approximately 77 square kilometres (7,700 ha; 30 mi^{2}). From its source near Lower Bodham (52.9077°N 1.1626°E) it falls 73 metres (240 ft) to the present tidal limit at Cley sluice. The sub-surface geology is predominantly chalk and in parts of the lower valley the river runs over chalk beds. The land adjoining the river consists of a mixture of arable farm land and, in the upper reaches near Edgefield, coniferous plantations. In the middle reaches there are grazing meadows and low-lying washlands especially below Glandford Mill. The Glaven has two major tributaries: Stody Beck joins just above Hunworth Mill (Map Ref TG 066 356), and the Thornage Beck joins close to the unbridged ford on the Thornage to Hunworth road (Map Ref TG 062 363).

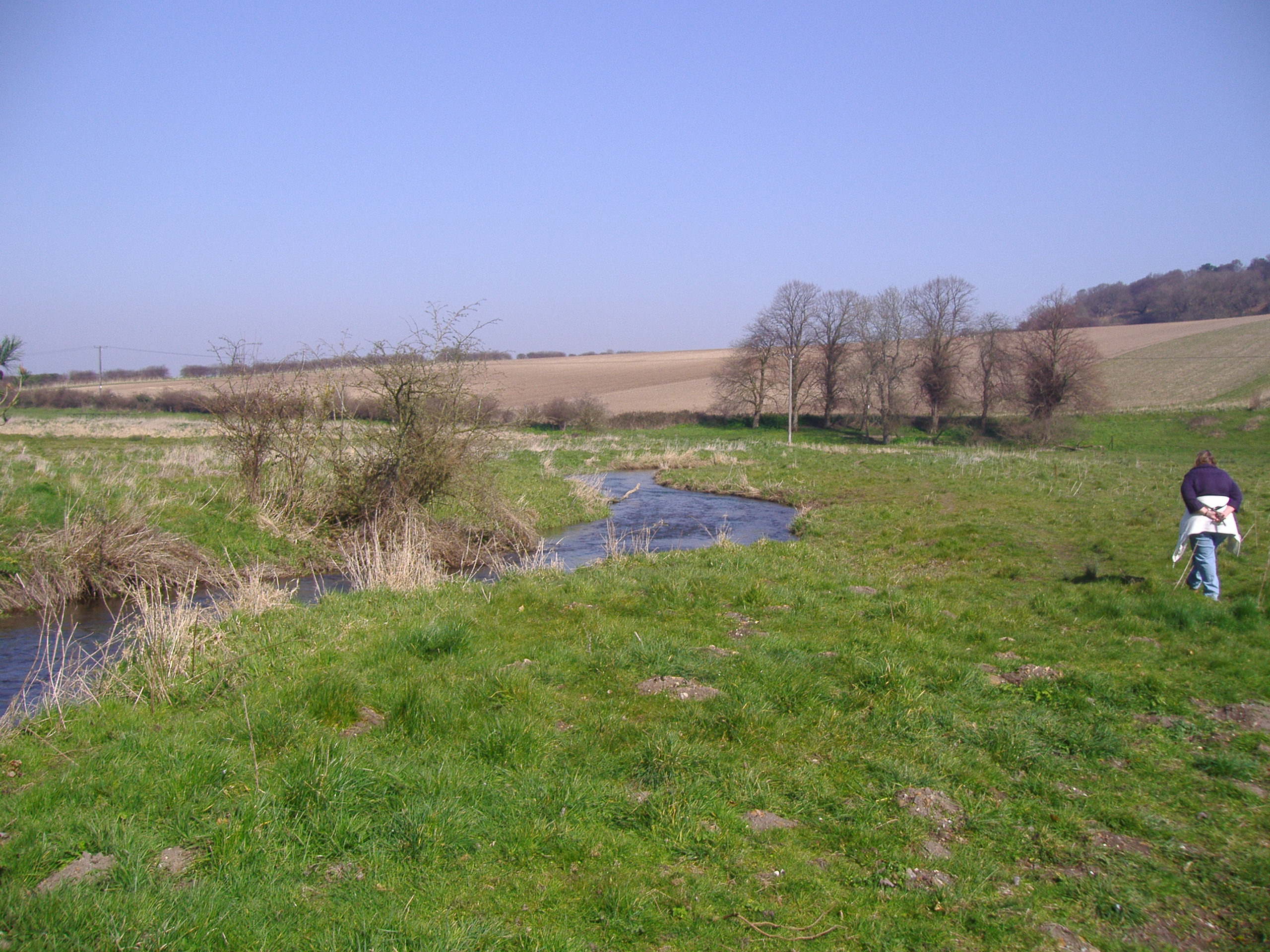
The river meanders across water meadows between Letheringsett and Glandford

== Water quality ==
Water quality is assessed generally as "Good" or "Moderate", with the exception of pollution from agricultural runoff: mercury and its compounds, and PBDE. (Note: Methyl mercury was formerly used as a fungicidal seed dressing. PDBE is deposited on lands as a contaminant of sewage sludge used as fertiliser.)

== Lakes and pools ==
There are three "on-stream" lakes associated with the main channel, these being Hawksmere (Hempstead mill pond), Edgefield Hall Lake and Bayfield Hall Lake. The long, thin lake at Bayfield Hall was dug in the late eighteenth century for ornamental purposes. In the late 19th century a tunnel was built into the valley side so that the Glaven could be partly diverted around the lake; this was required because regular flushing of mud from an up-stream millpond was silting the lake and killing fish.

This tunnel stopped operating in 2010 and the Bayfield Hall Project set out to create a new 1.2-mile long river channel, alongside the old tunnel, to support the wildlife, including trout and other species of fish. The meandering new channel was given a gravel bed, and the speed of water flow was calculated to retain silt in suspension, without disturbing the gravel. The tunnel was retained to provided a diversion in times of flood, and as a refuge for bats. This section of river was completed in 2014. This is the longest manmade river stretch in the UK. In 2024 the Environment Agency and Norfolk Rivers Trust extended the project by removing old embankments to restore the previous, meandering course.

== Watermills ==
At the time of the Domesday Book the River Glaven had 19 watermills. Today the Glaven has six: in order of river descent they are Hempstead, Hunworth, Thornage, Letheringsett, Letheringsett Brewery mill and Glandford. Letheringsett mill is still in use and is the only working watermill in Norfolk, grinding corn to make flour which is on sale at the mill shop.

== Wildlife ==
Water voles are present in the Glaven, in good numbers. Otters are difficult to see, but they make good use of the river. Mink were absent in 2023, after a trapping campaign in the river and its catchment area. Both red deer and roe deer are seen.

The bird population reflects the range of habitats available, and the total number of species present is around 126, of which 68 have bred (these figures do not include birds of the coastal wetlands north of the coast road (A 149) at Cley).

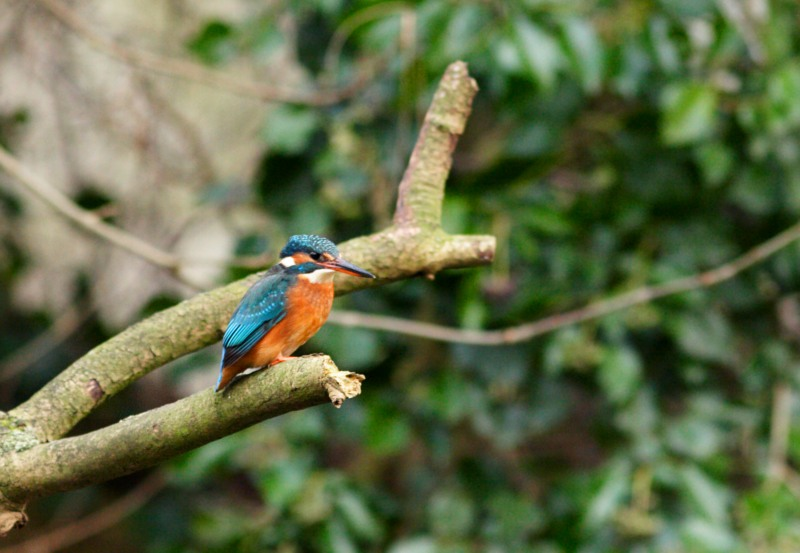
The kingfisher

Birds seen locally include kingfisher, barn owl, common buzzard and osprey. The last uses the Glaven Valley as a flyway on its spring and autumn migration and it also sometimes stays to fish. Common buzzard breed in small but increasing numbers and can be seen wheeling overhead. Barn owls frequently hunt during daylight hours. As winter approaches flocks of pink-footed geese and brent geese fly from the coast to feeding grounds on the farms inland.

=== Fish ===
Fish in the river include three-spined stickleback, bullhead, stone loach, brown trout, sea trout, brook lamprey, roach, rudd, perch, eel, pike, gudgeon, carp and tench.

=== Insects and dragonflies ===
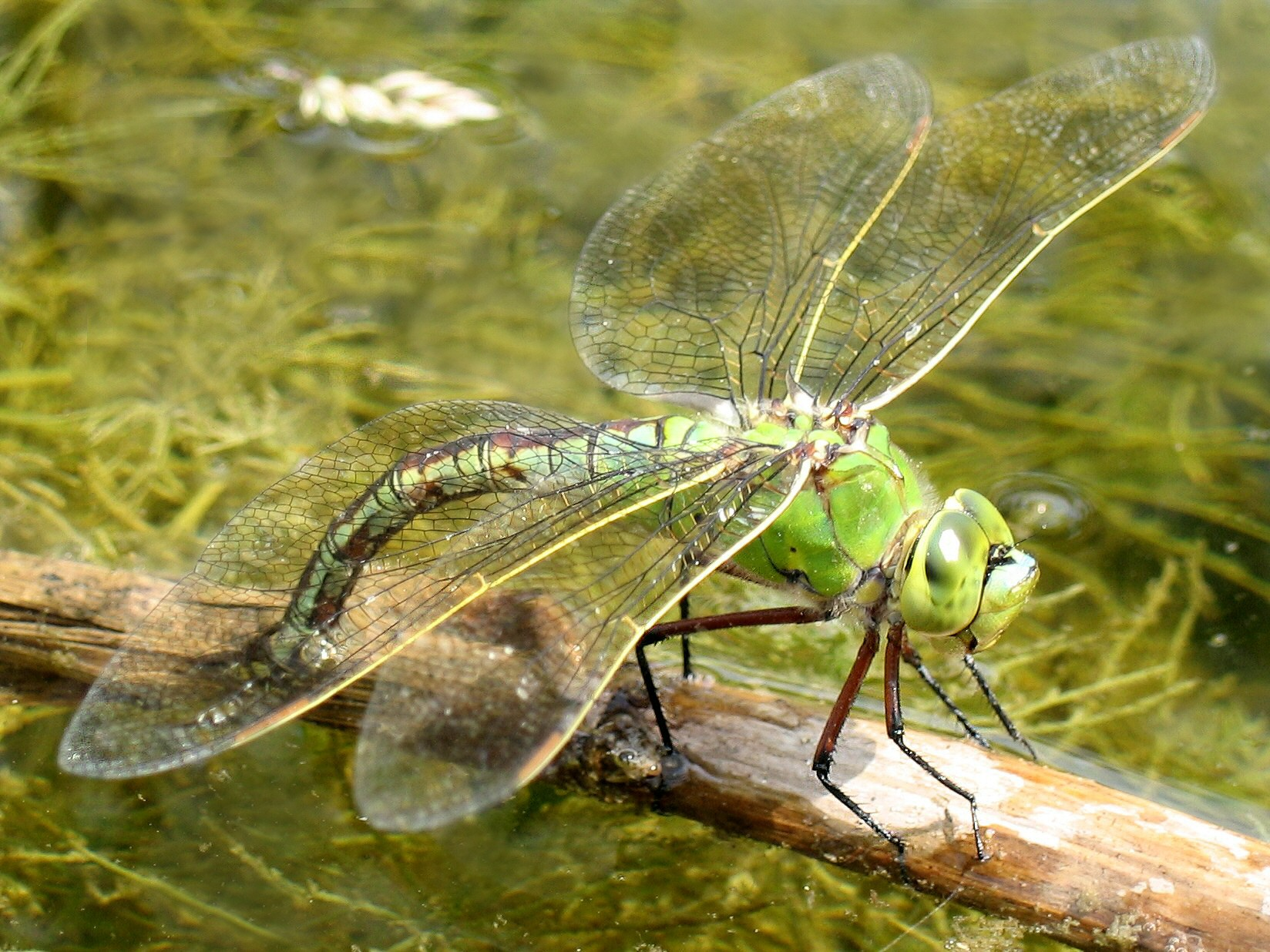
Emperor dragonfly

Some insects and dragonfly to be seen on the river include banded demoiselle, emerald damselfly, scarce emerald damselfly, large red damselfly, red-eyed damselfly, small red-eyed damselfly, azure damselfly, common blue damselfly, blue-tailed damselfly, migrant hawker, southern hawker, brown hawker, emperor dragonfly, four-spotted chaser, broad-bodied chaser, black-tailed skimmer, keeled skimmer, common darter, ruddy darter, common hawker, Norfolk hawker, hairy dragonfly, red-veined darter, yellow-winged darter, black darter and the variable damselfly.

=== Small mammals ===
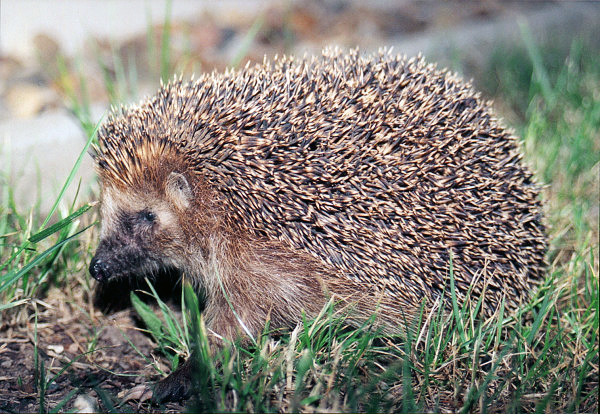
Hedgehog

Small mammals seen in or near the river include hedgehog, mole, common shrew, pygmy shrew, water shrew, noctule bat, pipistrelle bat, Natterer's bat, Daubenton's bat, rabbits, brown hares, grey squirrel, bank vole, short-tailed field vole, water vole, wood mouse, house mouse and the brown rat.

=== Larger mammals ===
Red deer, roe deer, muntjac, red fox, badger, otter, stoat, weasel and feral cats.

== Seaport ==
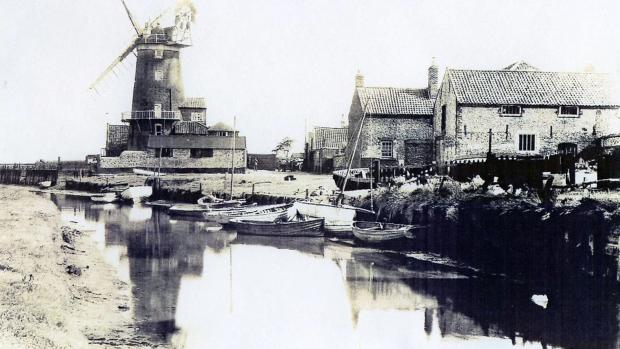
Cley quay, 1933

The Glaven Ports, Cley, Blakeney, Wiveden and Salthouse, were international trading ports for grain and fish until the nineteenth century, when land reclamation of Blakeney Spit for farming narrowed the river channel and put an end to the trade. In 2015 the river at Cley was cleared of silt to allow small craft access to the quay.

== Gallery ==
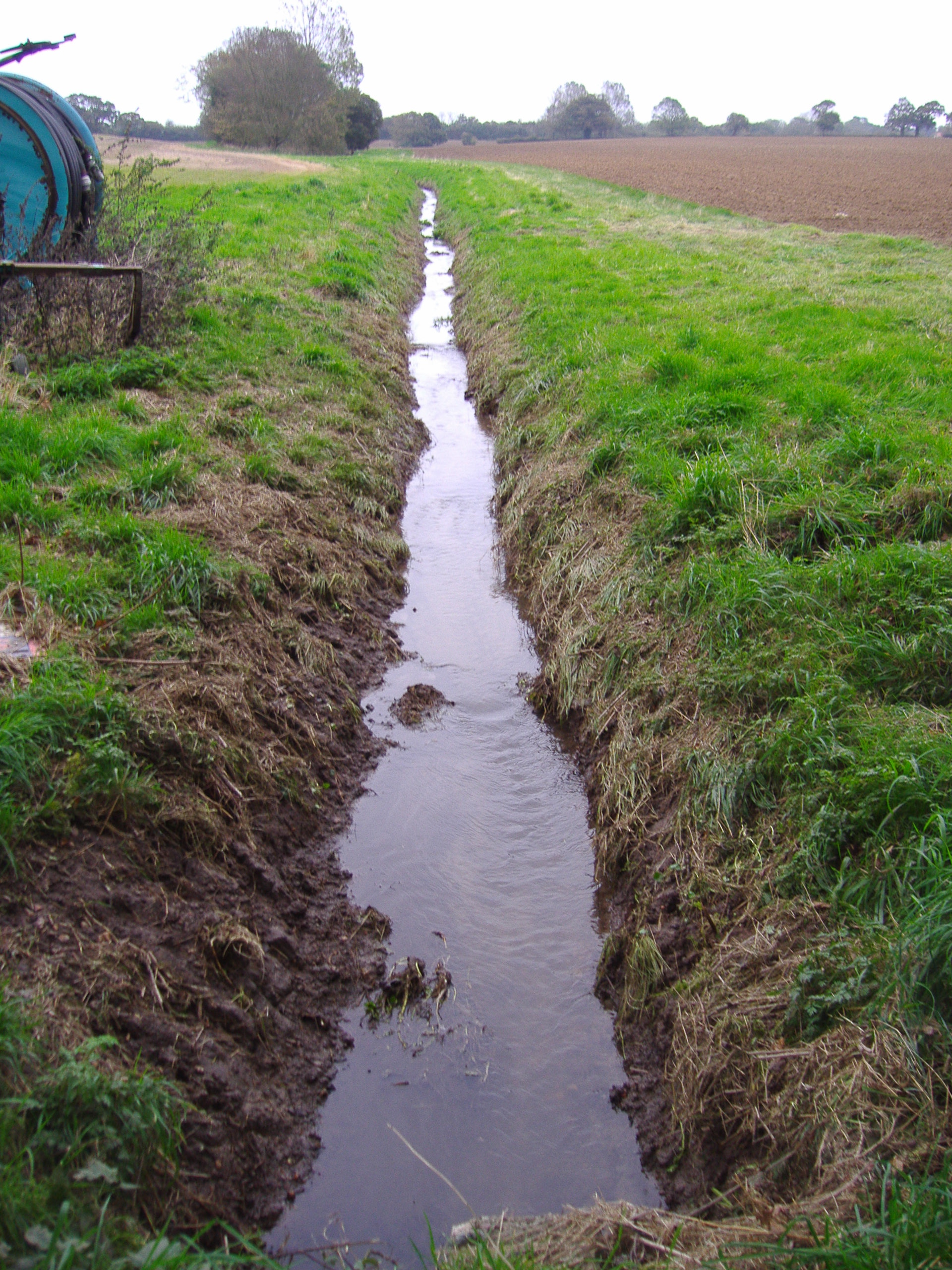
The River Glaven close to its source in lower Bodham

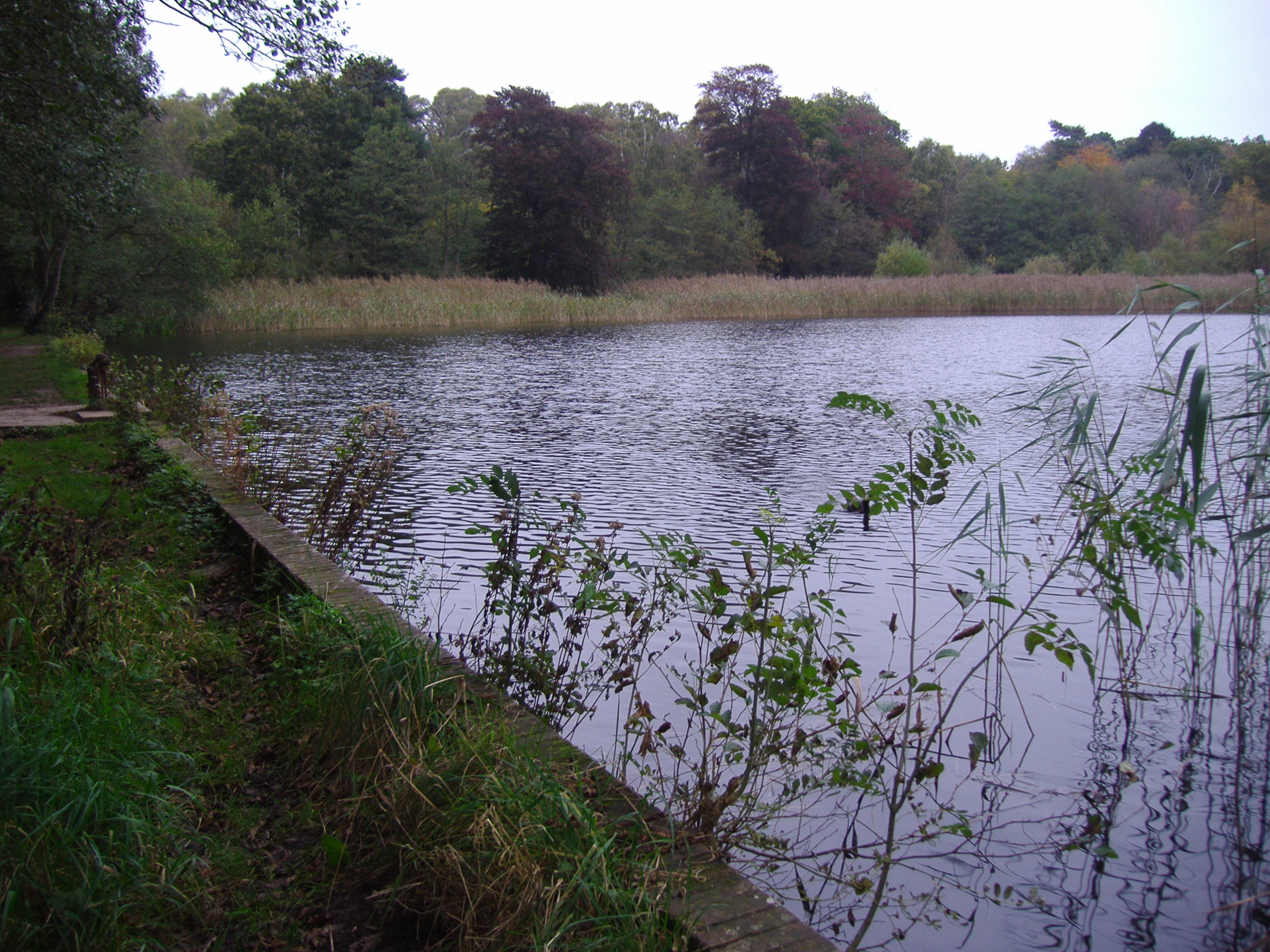
Selbrigg pond, part of the watercourse of the Glaven

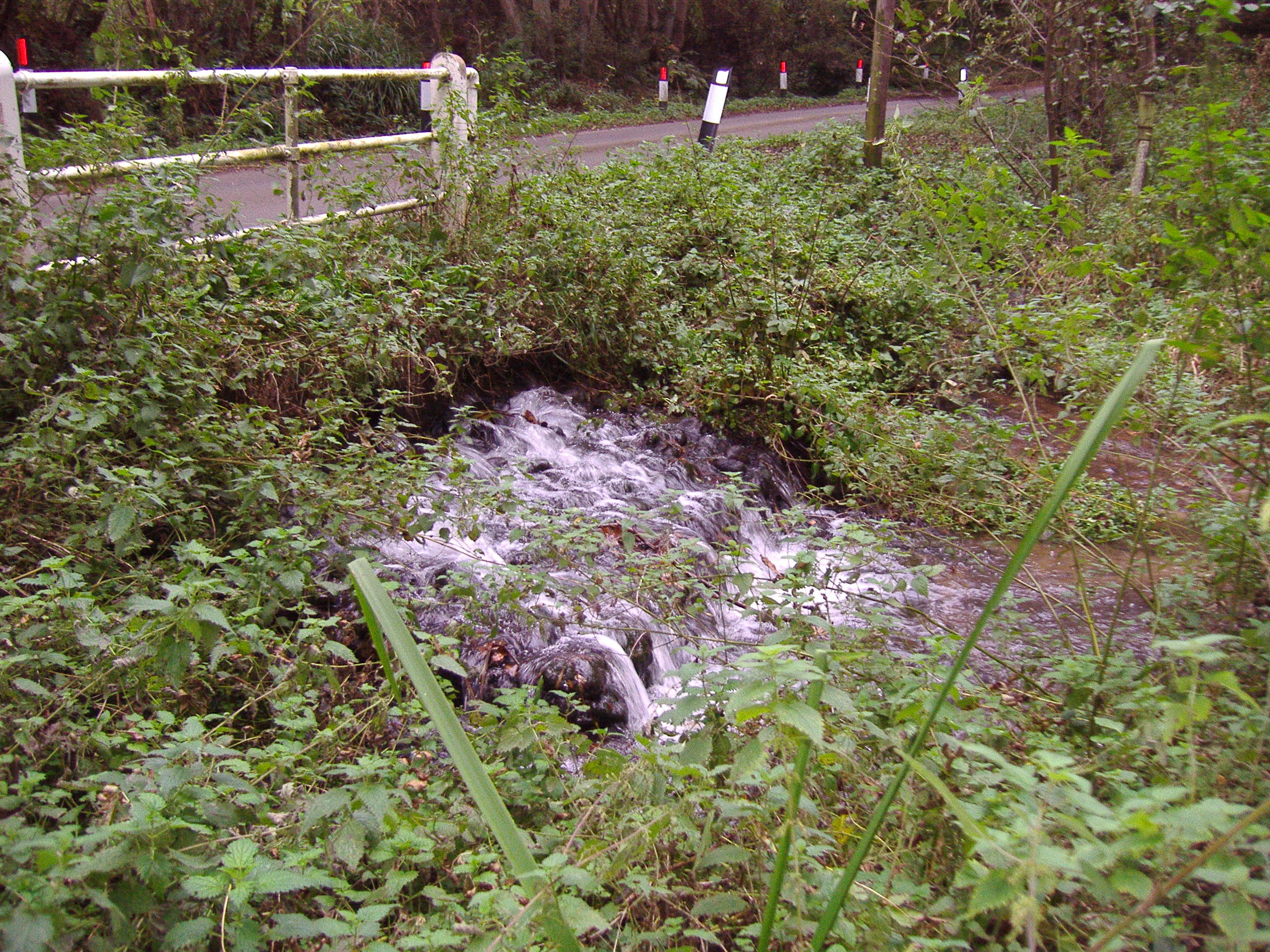
Two steams converge with the Glaven at the outlet from Selbrigg pond

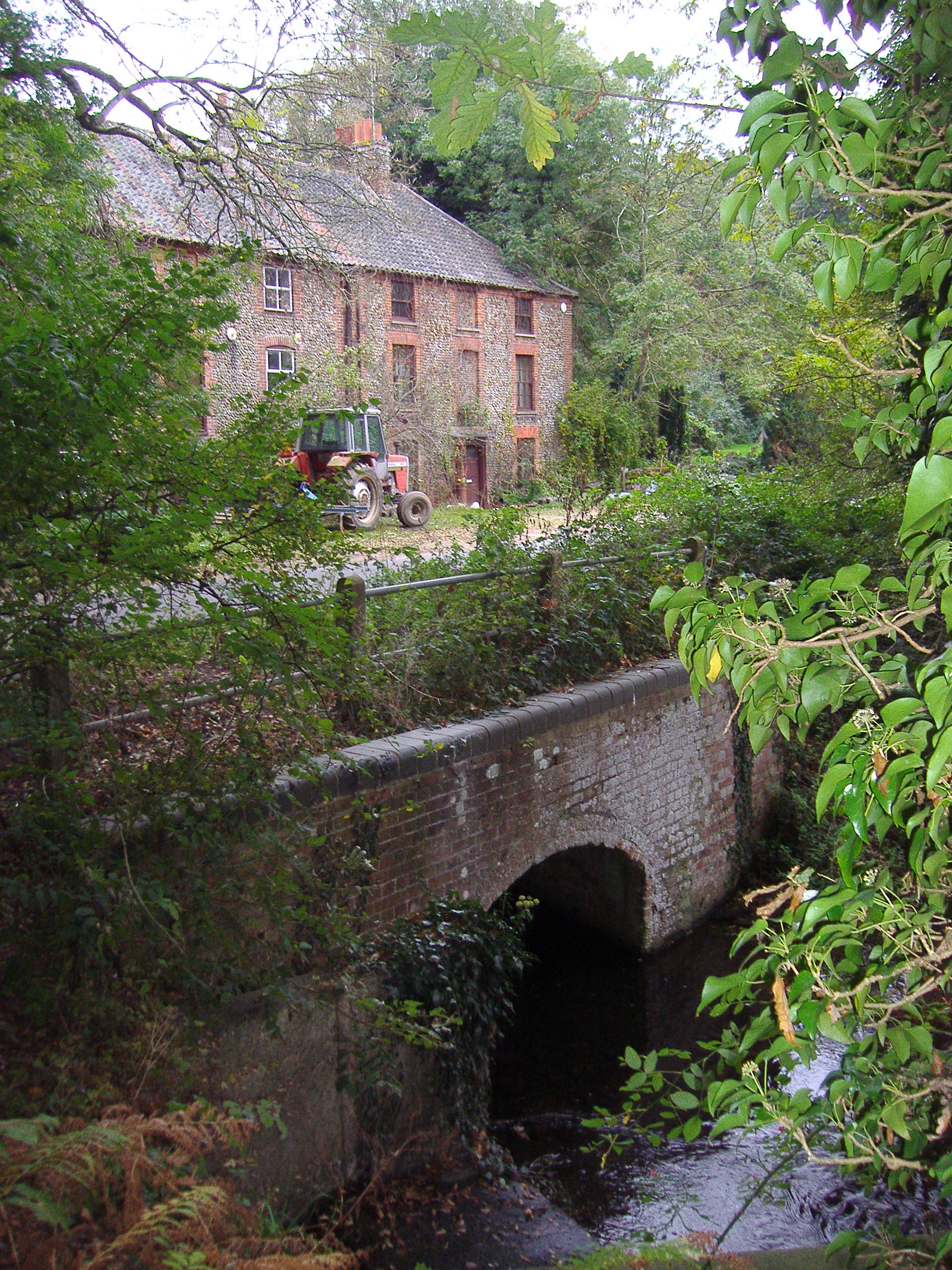
Hempstead Watermill on the River Glaven

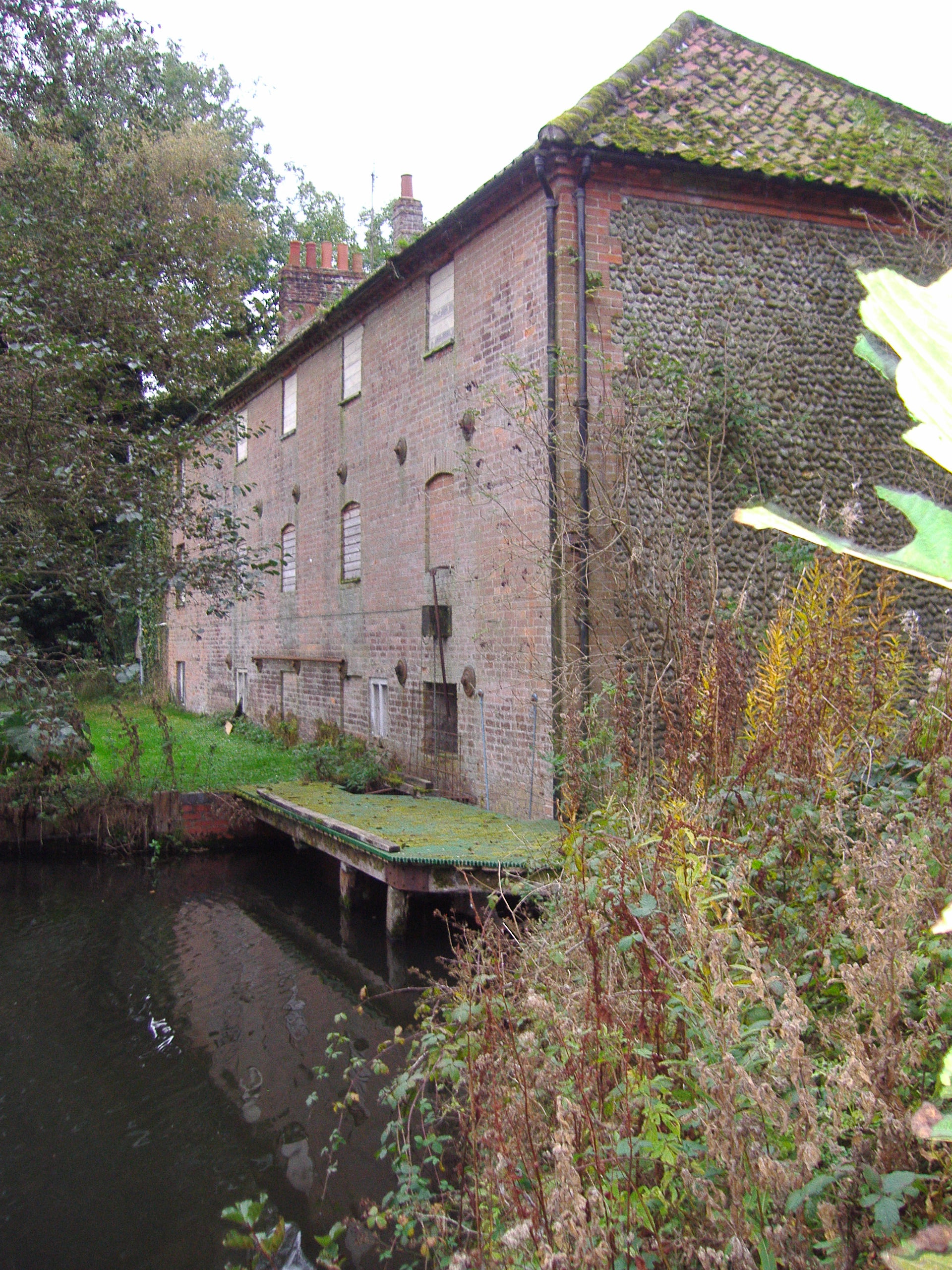
The rear elevation of Hempstead watermill

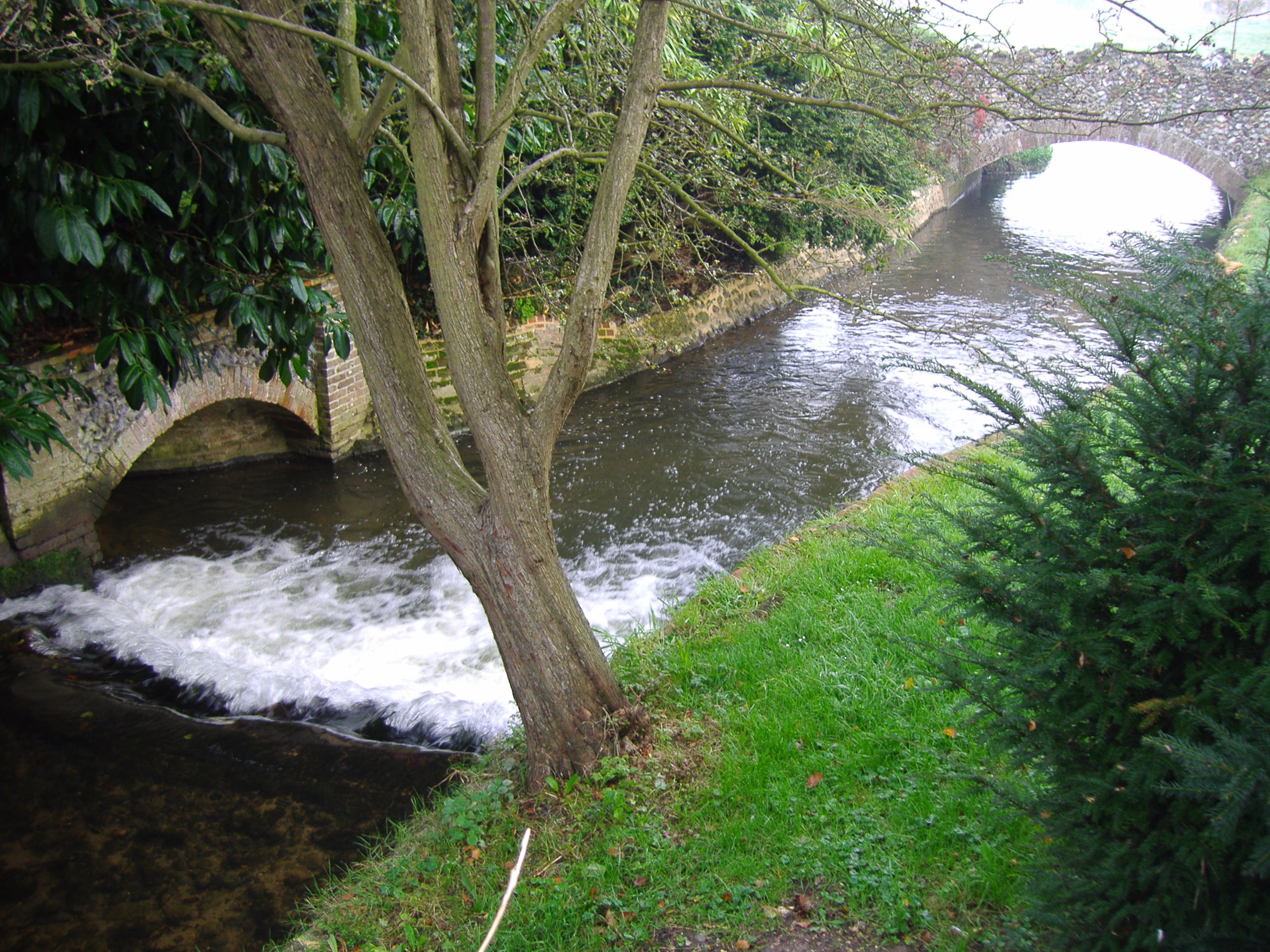
A weir on the River Glaven at Letheringsett

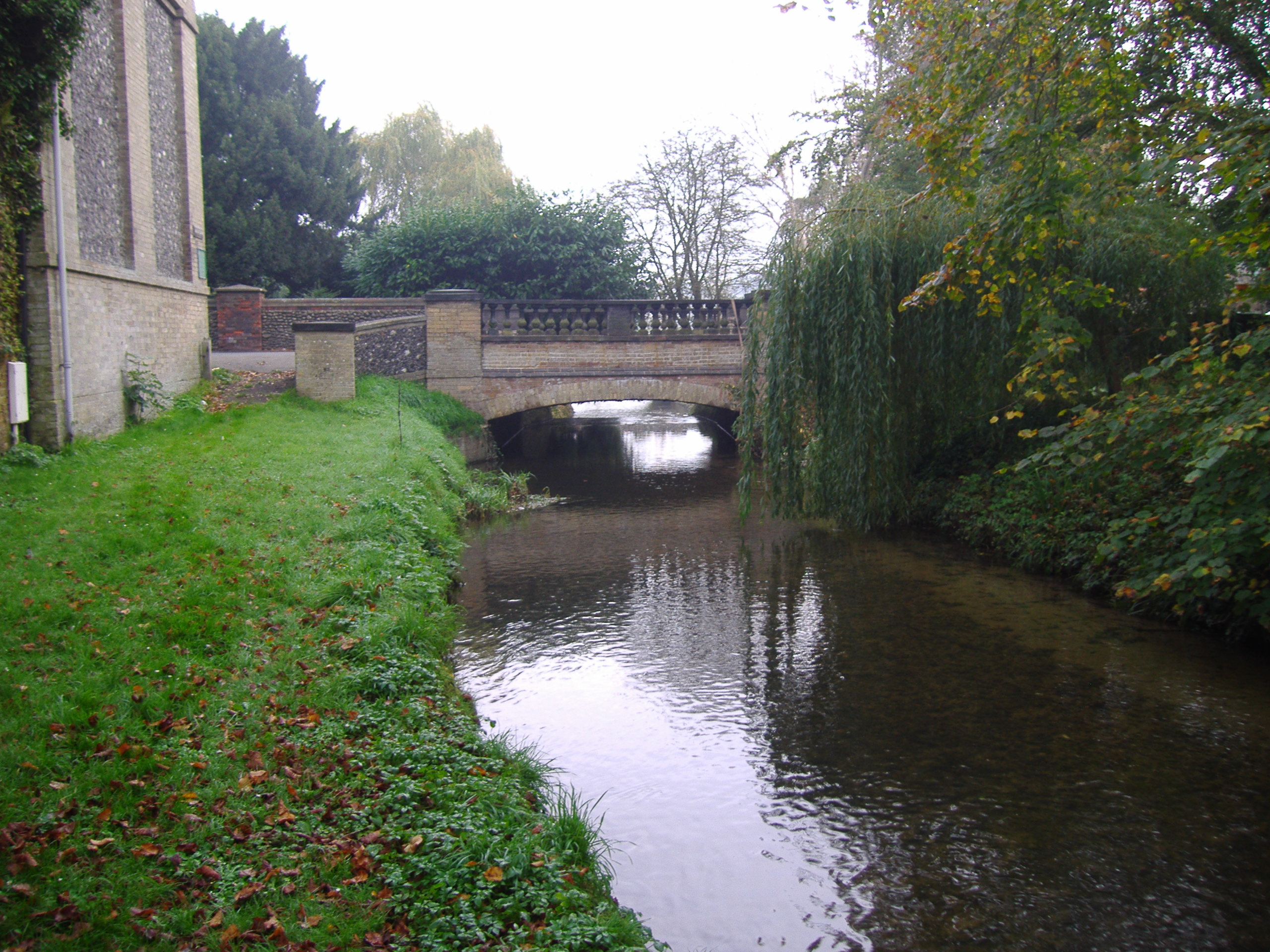
The Glaven River at the A148 road bridge in Letheringsett

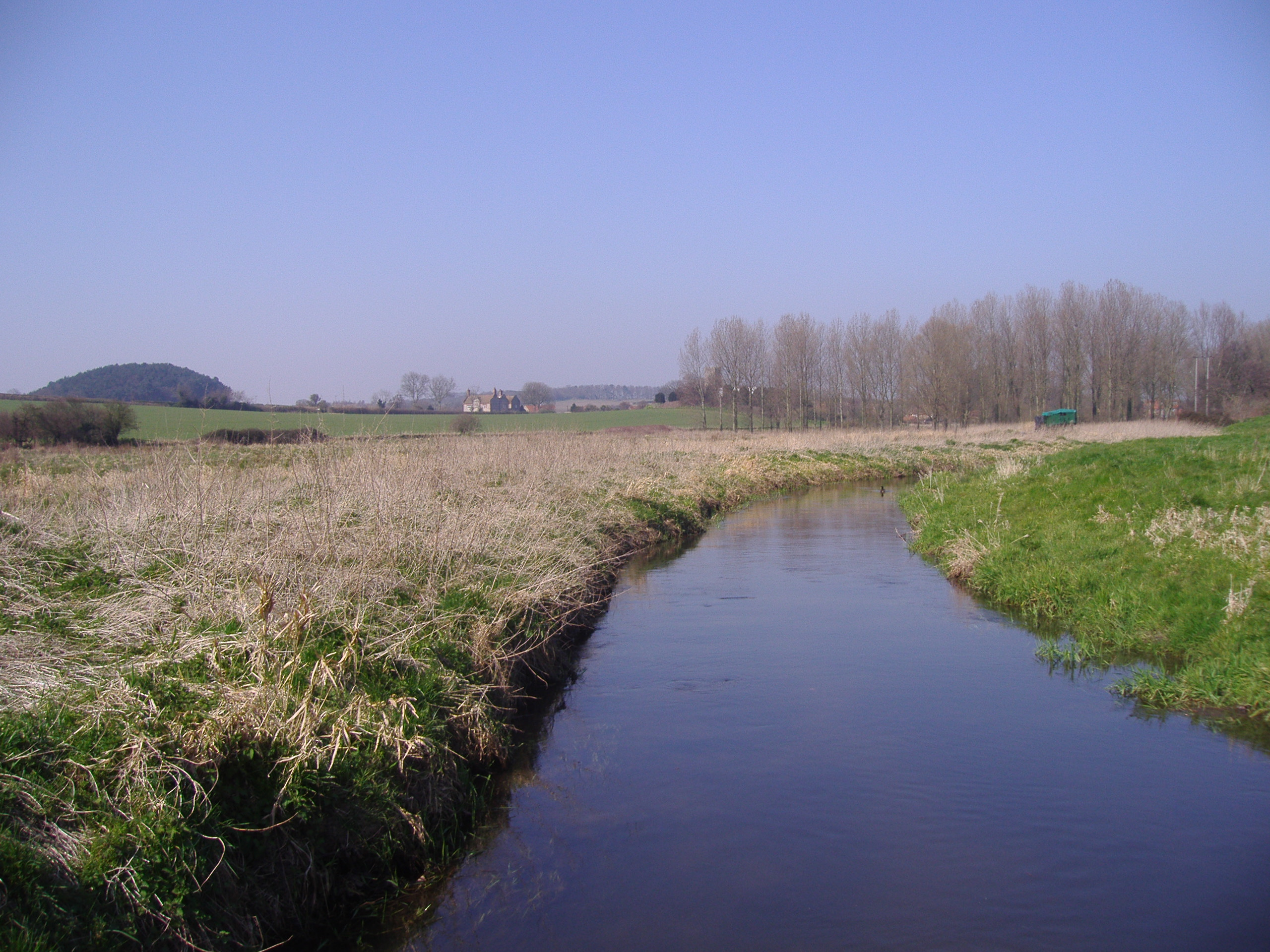
Watermeadows at Glandford

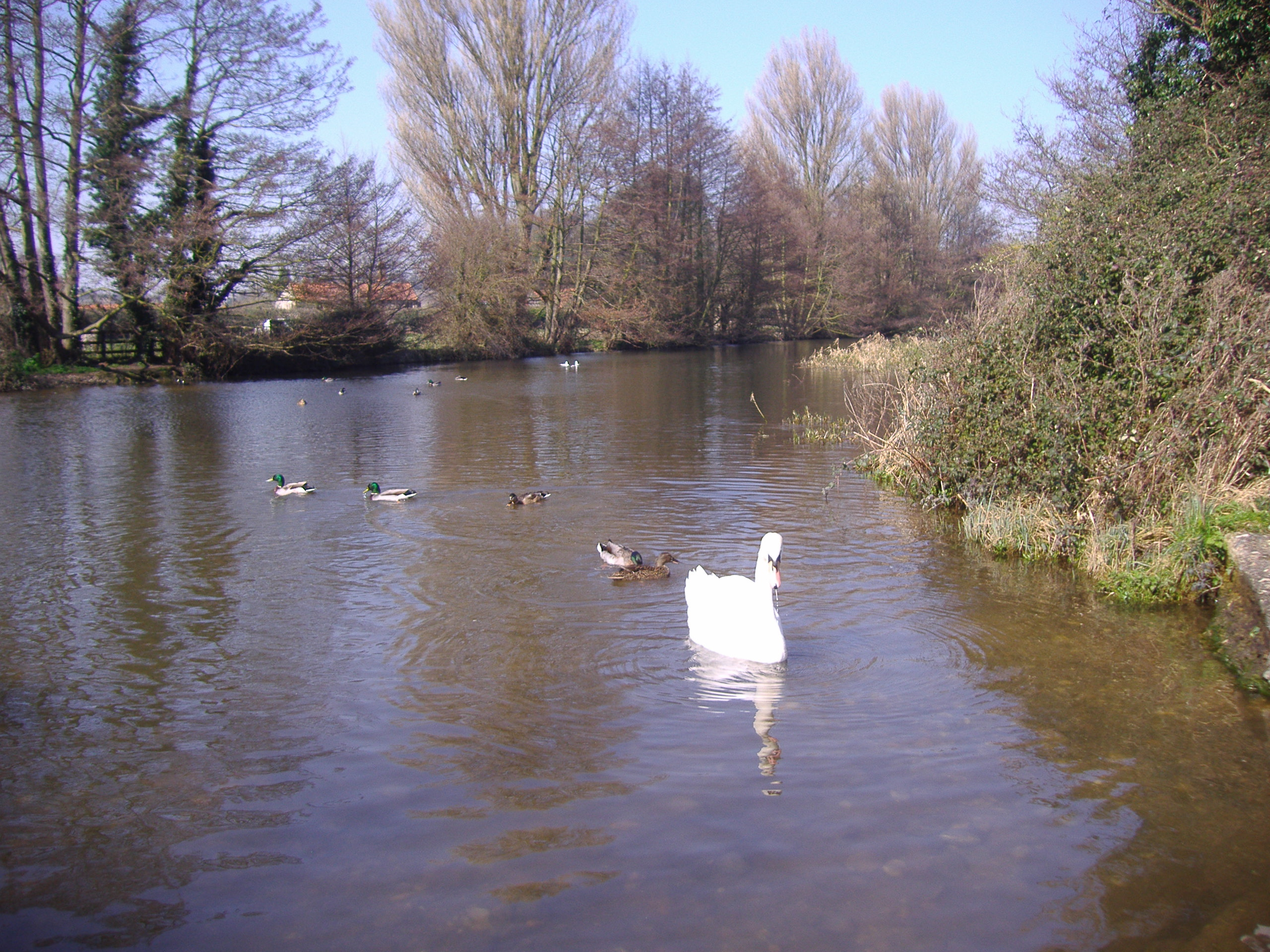
The millpond at Glandford
