= Thomas Pyle =

The Reverend Thomas Pyle (born at Stody, Norfolk, 1674, died Swaffham, Norfolk, 31 December 1756) was a Church of England clergyman and religious controversialist.

== Background and education ==
The son of the Reverend John Pyle (died 1709), Rector of Stody, he was educated at Gresham's School, Holt, and at Gonville and Caius College, Cambridge, where he was admitted sizar on 17 May 1692, at the age of seventeen. He was elected a scholar of the College later the same year. He graduated BA in 1696 and MA in 1699.

== Career ==
Pyle was ordained deacon on 30 May 1697 and priest on 25 September 1698, by Dr John Moore, bishop of Norwich, whose chaplain, William Whiston, commented that Pyle was one of the two best scholars he had ever examined.

He was appointed vicar of Thorpe Market in 1698. In 1701, he was appointed minister of St Nicholas's Chapel in King's Lynn. He was lecturer and curate of St Margaret's, King's Lynn, from 1711, and Rector of Bexwell (1708–9), Outwell (1709–18), and Watlington (1710–26).

Pyle was a strong Whig, and the accession of George I, together with the fact that King's Lynn was represented in parliament by the prime minister, Robert Walpole, gave Pyle hope of preferment in the church. His publications on the Bangorian controversy gained him the friendship of Benjamin Hoadly. After Hoadly became bishop of Salisbury, Pyle gained the living of Durnford, in Wiltshire. Pyle preached in London, and his Paraphrase of the Acts and Epistles, in the Manner of Dr Clarke (1725) and another volume of paraphrases gained the support of dissenters and latitudinarians such as Samuel Chandler, Samuel Clarke, and Thomas Herring. But Pyle never received additional preferment, even after Herring became Archbishop of Canterbury.

Pyle made no secret of his views on the Trinity, in which he adopted an Arian position, reveling in what he called "the glorious prerogative of private judgement, the birth-right of Protestants".

In 1732, he exchanged his old livings for the vicarage of St Margaret's, King's Lynn, which he retained until 1755, when he retired to Swaffham and died on 31 December 1756.

== Publications ==
- On the Bangorian controversy, Pyle wrote A Vindication of the Bishop of Bangor, in Answer to the Exceptions of Mr Law (1718) and A Second Vindication (1718). He also published two tracts in reply to Henry Stebbing's on the matter.
- A paraphrase with short and useful notes on the books of the Old Testament. : the third and fourth volumes. Vol. III. contains a paraphrase on Joshua. ... II Samuel. Vol. IV. contains I Kings. ... Esther. For the use of families. By Thomas Pyle (1725)
- Paraphrase of the Acts and Epistles, in the Manner of Dr Clarke (1725)
- Three collections of his religious discourses were published by Philip Pyle in 1773, 1777, and 1783.

== Family ==
Pyle married Mary Rolfe (1681/2–1748) of King's Lynn, in 1701, and they had three sons, all clergymen. Edmund (1702–1776) was lecturer at St Nicholas's, King's Lynn, archdeacon of York, chaplain to Bishop Benjamin Hoadly and chaplain to the King. Thomas (1713–1807), became a canon of Salisbury and of Winchester. Philip (1724–1799), was Rector of North Lynn.
