= North Norfolk District Council Headquarters =

Local government office in the UK

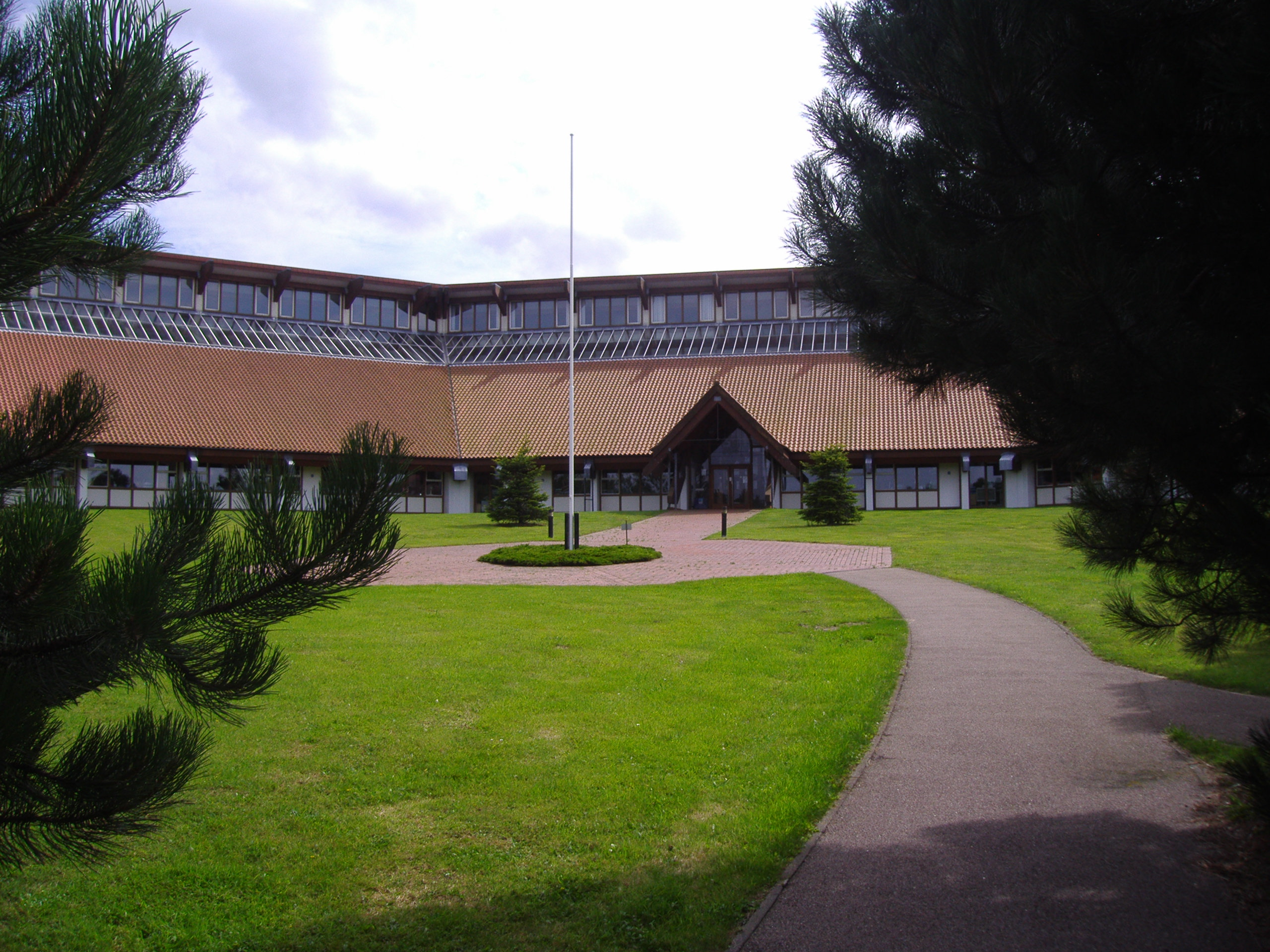
- The north elevation of the building

- North Norfolk District Council Headquarters within Norfolk

General information
- Type: Civic building
- Location: Holt Road (A148), Cromer, England
- Coordinates: 52°55′30″N 1°17′9″E
- Opened: 1990
- Owner: North Norfolk District Council

Website
- www.northnorfolk.org

North Norfolk District Council Headquarters is located in Holt Road in a prominent position south of the town of Cromer in the English county of Norfolk. It was built between 1988 and 1990. The nearest railway station is at Cromer for the Bittern Line which runs between Sheringham, Cromer and Norwich. The nearest airport is Norwich International Airport.

== Description ==
The building was designed by David Gipson of the district Architect’s Department. The building footprint is designed on a shallow "V" shape with each arm of the "V" forming the two wings of the building. The roof is broad and tiled with Norfolk red pantiles rising to a clerestory. The Gable ends are constructed from red brick and Flint. To south elevation of the building is clad in an Ivory coloured compressed cement board. The south elevation is also the location of the main entrance to the building and of the car park facilities. The entrance way is constructed from timber, Glass and has masonry dwarf walls each side. The roof rises to an apex which runs out from the south elevation. Solar panels have been installed on the roof.

=== Interior ===
On the inside of the building there are large laminated wooden beams of a honey colour. The beams run from the floor and curve away to the right and left, following the "V" plan of the two wings, so that one end cannot be seen from the other. There is a longitudinal division, with two storeys of offices on the south elevation. The upper floor overlooks the sweep of the open plan below. There is a council chamber on the first floor.
