= Stody =

Village in Norfolk, England

Coordinates: 52.87291°N 1.05409°E

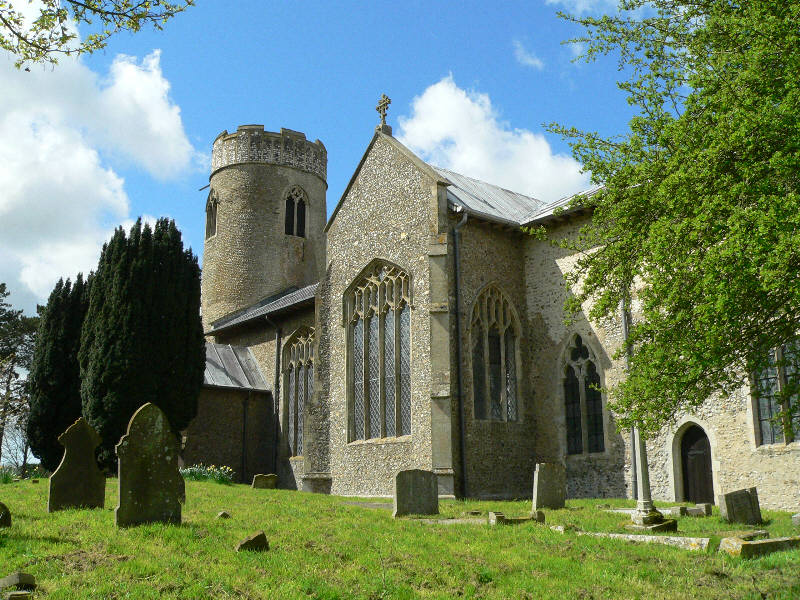
- Saint Mary Parish Church, Stody

- Location within Norfolk
- Area: 7.99 km^{2} (3.08 sq mi)
- Population: 185 (Including Hunworth, 2011 census)
  - Density: 23/km^{2} (60/sq mi)
- OS grid reference: TG050350
  - London: 125 miles (201 km)
- Civil parish: Stody CP
- District: North Norfolk
- Shire county: Norfolk
- Region: East
- Country: England
- Sovereign state: United Kingdom
- Post town: MELTON CONSTABLE
- Postcode district: NR24
- Dialling code: 01263
- Police: Norfolk
- Fire: Norfolk
- Ambulance: East of England

Stody is a village and a civil parish in the English county of Norfolk. The village is 13.2 miles (21.2 km) west south west of Cromer, 21.8 miles (35.1 km) north north west of Norwich and 125 miles (201 km) north north east of London. The village lies 4.1 miles (6.6 km) south west of the town of Holt. The nearest railway station is at Sheringham for the Bittern Line which runs between Sheringham, Cromer and Norwich. The nearest airport is Norwich International Airport.

== Correct pronunciation ==
"Study"

== History ==
Stody has an entry in the Domesday Book of 1085. In the great book Stody is recorded by the name ‘’Estodeia’’ and “Stodeia it is said to be in the ownership of the King. The main tennent was Humphrey from Ranulf brother of Ilger. The survey also notes that there were three mills, three Beehives and sixty Goats. The name Stody derives from “an enclosure for horses”, the modern English word 'stud' comes from the same root

== Stody Estate ==
The Earl of Lothian owned Stody Estate in the latter part of the nineteenth century along with the nearby Blickling Estate. In 1932 the estate was purchased by Lord Rothermere who built the existing house after the original house was largely destroyed by fire. The estate was sold to George Knight and Fritz Knight in 1941 and is farmed by George Knight's stepson's family today. The land is all in hand. By today's standards the farm is quite diverse, but 40 years ago the estate was well known for its pedigree herds and flocks, fruit farm, poultry and flowers.

Stody Lodge Gardens open each year in May. The gardens consist of 10 acres (40,000 m^{2}) of rhododendron and azalea gardens.

== The Parish Church of Mary ==
The Parish Church of Saint Mary is constructed from flint and has a 14th-century round tower. There is a nave, chancel and two transepts and a fine example of cross-vaulting at the point of the intersection. The church has a collection of 15th-century stained glass figures. They are set high in the lights of the north side windows, and in the east side of the south transept. At the west end of the church there is a 13th-century Purbeck marble font. The church is a Grade I listed building.

== Notable people ==
- The Reverend Thomas Pyle was born at Stody in 1674 and died Swaffham, Norfolk, 31 December 1756 and was a Church of England clergyman and religious controversialist.
