= Hempstead, near Holt, Norfolk =

Village in Norfolk, England

Coordinates: 52.8912°N 1.127°E

Hempstead
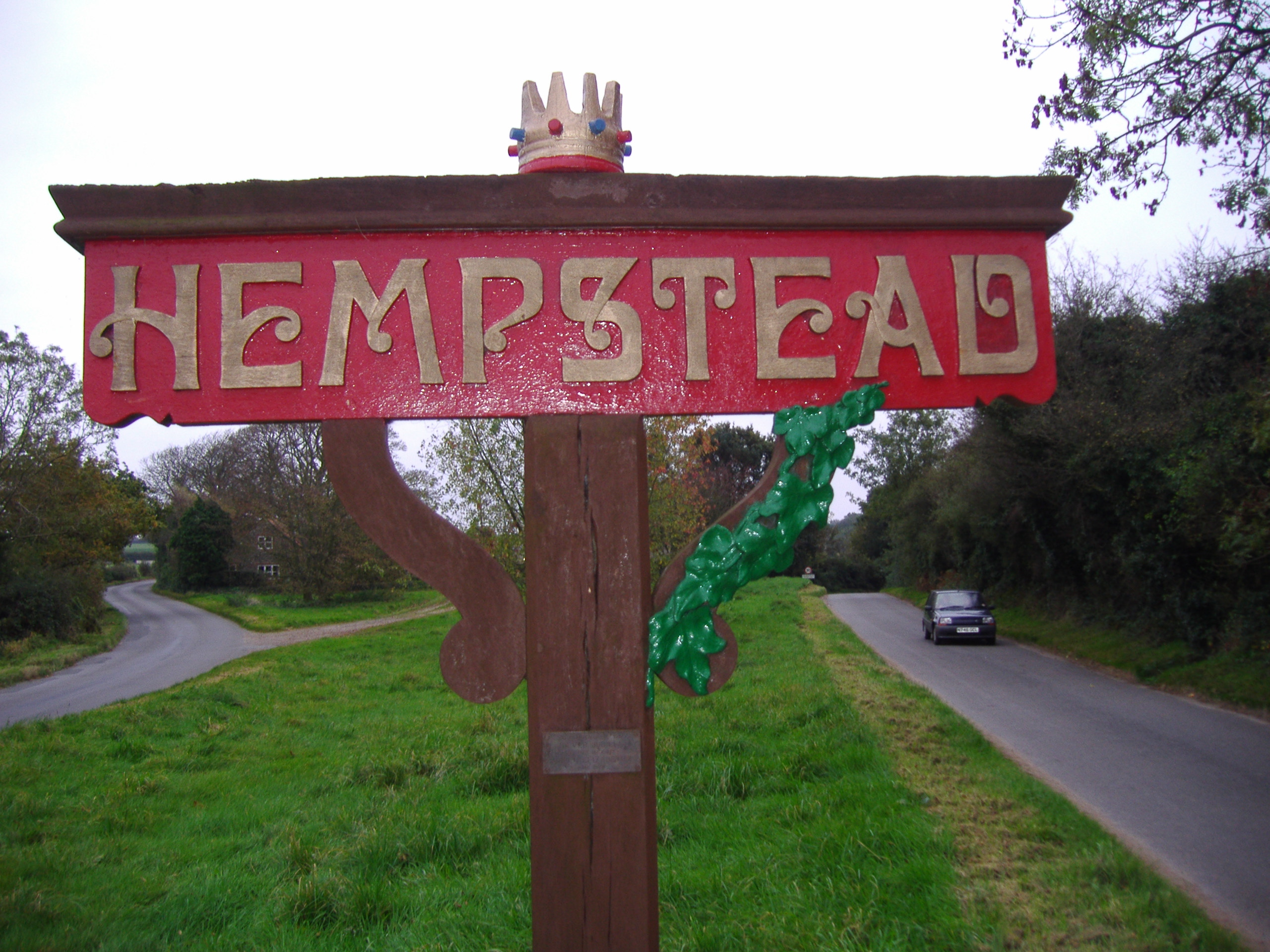
- Hempstead Village Sign

- Location within Norfolk
- Area: 2.78 sq mi (7.2 km^{2})
- Population: 173 (2021 census)
  - Density: 62/sq mi (24/km^{2})
- OS grid reference: TG105370
- Civil parish: Hempstead
- District: North Norfolk
- Shire county: Norfolk
- Region: East
- Country: England
- Sovereign state: United Kingdom
- Post town: HOLT
- Postcode district: NR25
- Dialling code: 01263
- Police: Norfolk
- Fire: Norfolk
- Ambulance: East of England
- UK Parliament: North Norfolk

There is also a village called Hempstead near Stalham, also in North Norfolk.

Hempstead is a village and civil parish in the English county of Norfolk.

Hempstead is located 2.7 miles (4.3 km) south-east of Holt and 20 miles (32 km) north of Norwich.

== History ==
Hempstead's name is of Anglo-Saxon origin and derives from the Old English for the steading where hemp is cultivated.

In the Domesday Book, Hempstead is listed as a settlement of 17 households in the hundred of Holt. In 1086, the village was part of the East Anglian estates of King William I and William de Beaufeu.

Hempstead Hall dates from the Seventeenth Century but was built upon the site of an earlier hall from the Elizabethan era. During the Fifteenth Century, the hall was the seat of the Stapleton family who later passed it to the Calthorpe family.

== Demography ==
Population change
Year	Pop.	±%
1831	286	—
1836	286	+0.0%
1845	296	+3.5%
1854	338	+14.2%
1863	206	−39.1%
1864	280	+35.9%
1871	249	−11.1%
1881	264	+6.0%
1891	225	−14.8%
1901	225	+0.0%
1911	259	+15.1%
1921	254	−1.9%
1931	216	−15.0%
2001	179	−17.1%
2011	177	−1.1%
2021	173	−2.3%

According to the 2021 census, Hempstead has a population of 173 people which shows a decrease from the 177 people recorded in the 2011 census.

== Media ==
Local television news programmes are BBC Look East on BBC One and ITV News Anglia on ITV1.

Local radio stations are BBC Radio Norfolk on 95.6 FM, Heart East on 102.4 FM and Greatest Hits Radio East (formerly North Norfolk Radio) on 103.2 FM.

The village is served by the local newspapers; North Norfolk News and Eastern Daily Press, as well as Church and Village News - the local newsletter of the Matlaske Benefice.

== All Saints' Church ==
Hempstead's parish church dates from the Fourteenth Century. All Saints' is located within the village on The Street and has been Grade II listed since 1960. The church holds regular Sunday service and is part of the Matlaske Benefice.

All Saints' has a thatched roof that was completed in the 1930s whilst inside there is an Art Nouveau lectern with a large stained-glass window dating from the 1880s by W.H. Constable.

== Governance ==
Hempstead is part of the electoral ward of Gresham for local elections and is part of the district of North Norfolk.

The village's national constituency is North Norfolk, which has been represented by the Liberal Democrat Steff Aquarone MP since 2024.

== War Memorial ==
Hempstead's war memorial is a framed document inside All Saints' Church which lists the following names for the First World War:

Rank	Name	Unit	Date of death	Burial/Commemoration
Lt.	Joseph H. Morgan	British Red Cross	17 Mar. 1917	Unknown
Pte.	William T. Hicks	2nd Bn., Norfolk Regiment	31 Mar. 1916	Kirkee War Cemetery
Pte.	James West	5th Bn., Norfolk Regt.	26 May 1915	All Saints' Church
Spr.	Samuel Lowe	1st Coy., Royal Engineers	26 Apr. 1915	Helles Memorial

== Gallery ==
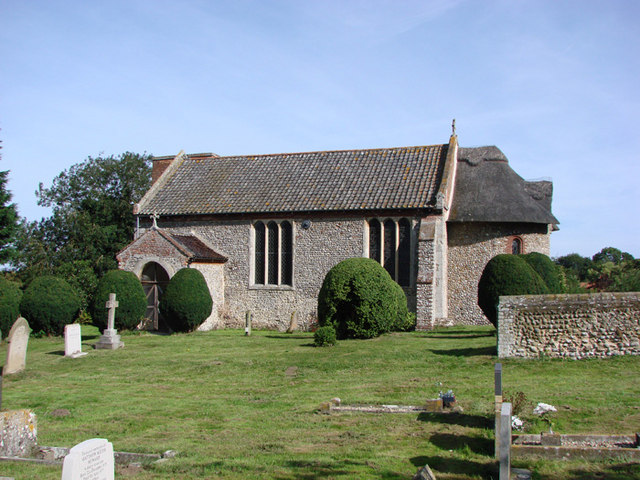
All Saints' Church

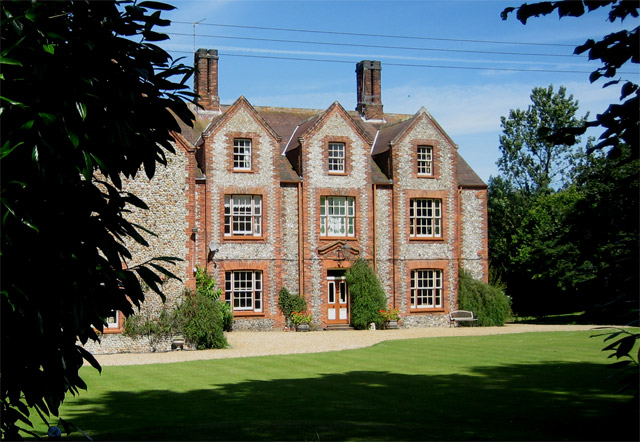
Hempstead Hall
