= North Norfolk =

District in Norfolk, England

Coordinates: 52°56′N 1°18′E

North Norfolk District
- Non-metropolitan district
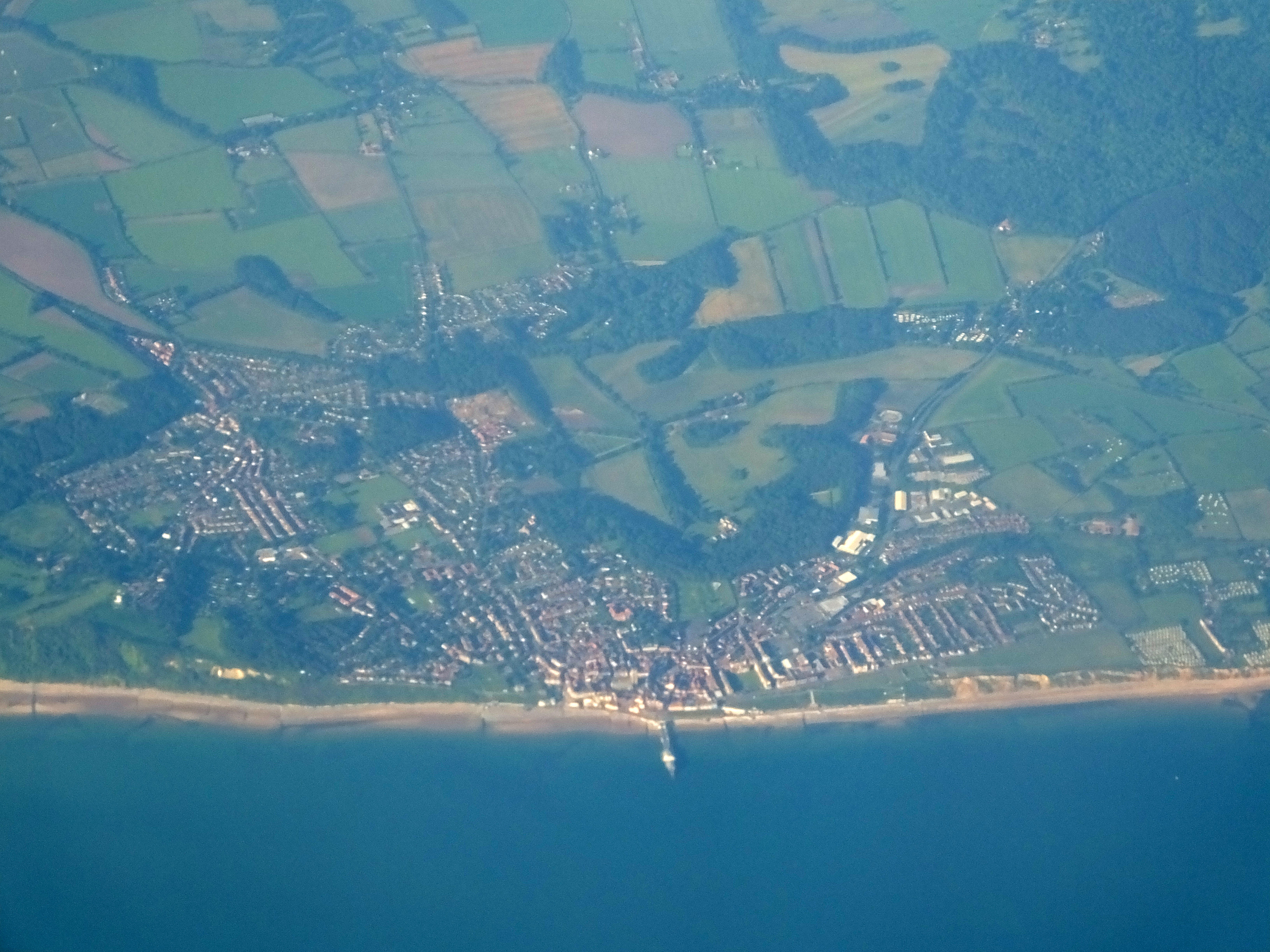
- Cromer, the administrative centre of North Norfolk and the third-largest settlement

- Shown within Norfolk
- Sovereign state: United Kingdom
- Constituent country: England
- Region: East of England
- Administrative county: Norfolk
- Formed: 1 April 1974
- Admin. HQ: Cromer

Government
  - Type: North Norfolk District Council
  - MPs: Steffan Aquarone (LD); Jerome Mayhew (C)

Area
  - Total: 373 sq mi (966 km^{2})
  - Rank: 28th

Population (2024)
  - Total: 103,217
  - Rank: Ranked 241st
  - Density: 277/sq mi (107/km^{2})

Ethnicity (2021)
  - Ethnic groups: List: 98.1% White; 0.9% Mixed; 0.5% Asian; 0.2% other; 0.2% Black

Religion (2021)
  - Religion: List: 52.3% Christianity; 39.6% no religion; 7.9% other; 0.2% Islam
- Time zone: UTC+0 (Greenwich Mean Time)
  - Summer (DST): UTC+1 (British Summer Time)
- ONS code: 33UF (ONS); E07000147 (GSS)

North Norfolk is a local government district in Norfolk, England. Its council is based in Cromer, and the largest town is North Walsham. The district also includes the towns of Fakenham, Holt, Sheringham, Stalham and Wells-next-the-Sea, along with numerous villages and surrounding rural areas.

The district lies on the north coast of Norfolk, facing the North Sea, with much of its coastline lying within the Norfolk Coast Area of Outstanding Natural Beauty. Some south-eastern parts of the district lie within The Broads. The neighbouring districts are Great Yarmouth, Breckland, Broadland and King's Lynn and West Norfolk.

== History ==
The district was created on 1 April 1974 under the Local Government Act 1972, covering seven former districts which were all abolished at the same time:

- Cromer Urban District
- Erpingham Rural District
- North Walsham Urban District
- Sheringham Urban District
- Smallburgh Rural District
- Walsingham Rural District
- Wells-next-the-Sea Urban District

A committee of the outgoing councils drew up a list of possible names for the new district to be considered by the Local Government Boundary Commission. Suggested names included North Norfolk, Seafields, Pastonacres, Norfolk Coastal and Cromer. The commission chose the name Pastonacres, which had been coined by a member of Smallburgh Rural District Council in recognition of the extensive landholdings in the area of the Paston family in medieval times. The name was not a popular choice locally, and at the very first meeting of the shadow Pastonacres District Council elected in 1973 it was resolved to change the name to North Norfolk, which was agreed by the government in September 1973, before the new district formally came into being in 1974.

In March 2026, the government announced plans to abolish the district in 2028 as part of local government reorganisation across Norfolk. These proposals were withdrawn in September 2026.

== Governance ==
North Norfolk District Council

Type
- Type: Non-metropolitan district

Leadership
- Chair: Matthew Taylor, Conservative since 20 May 2026
- Leader: Tim Adams, Liberal Democrat since 9 February 2022
- Chief Executive: Steve Blatch since 2020

Structure
- Seats: 40 councillors
- Political groups: Administration (26) Liberal Democrats (26) Other parties (14) Conservative (11) Independent (3)

Elections
- Last election: 4 May 2023

Meeting place
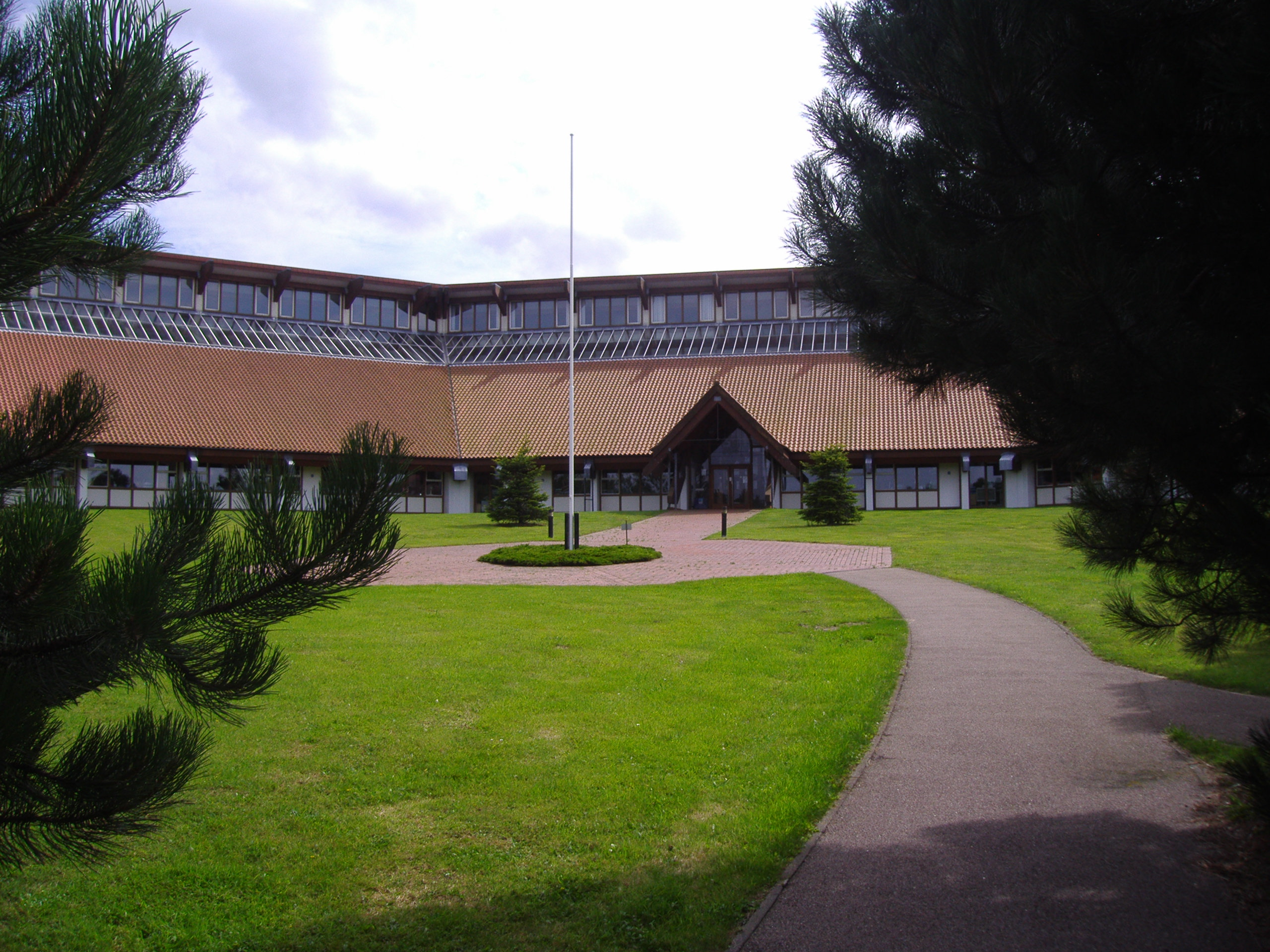
- Council Offices, Holt Road, Cromer, NR27 9EN

Website
- www.north-norfolk.gov.uk

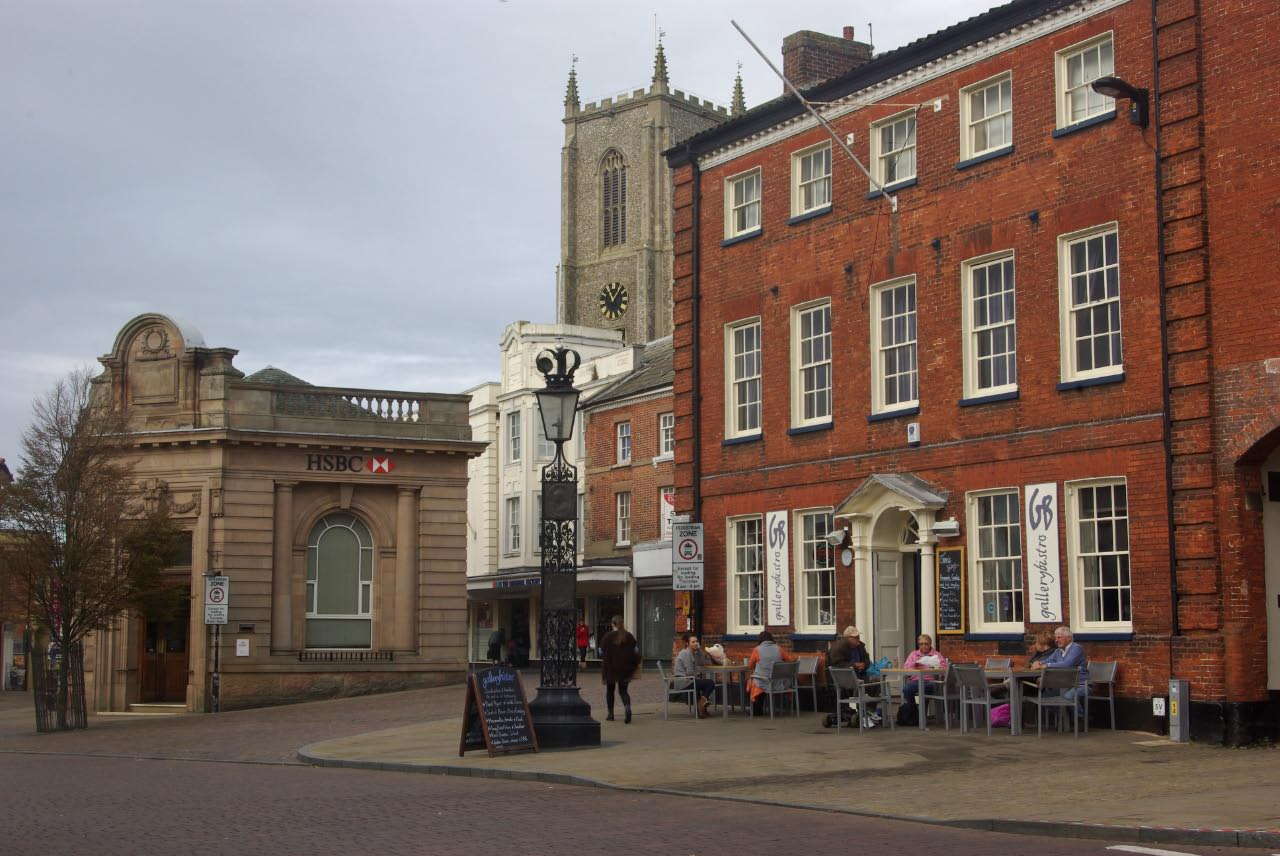
Fakenham, best known for Fakenham Racecourse and is the third-largest settlement

North Norfolk District Council provides district-level services. County-level services are provided by Norfolk County Council. The whole district is also covered by civil parishes, which form a third tier of local government.

In the parts of the district within The Broads, town planning is the responsibility of the Broads Authority. The district council appoints one of its councillors to sit on that authority.

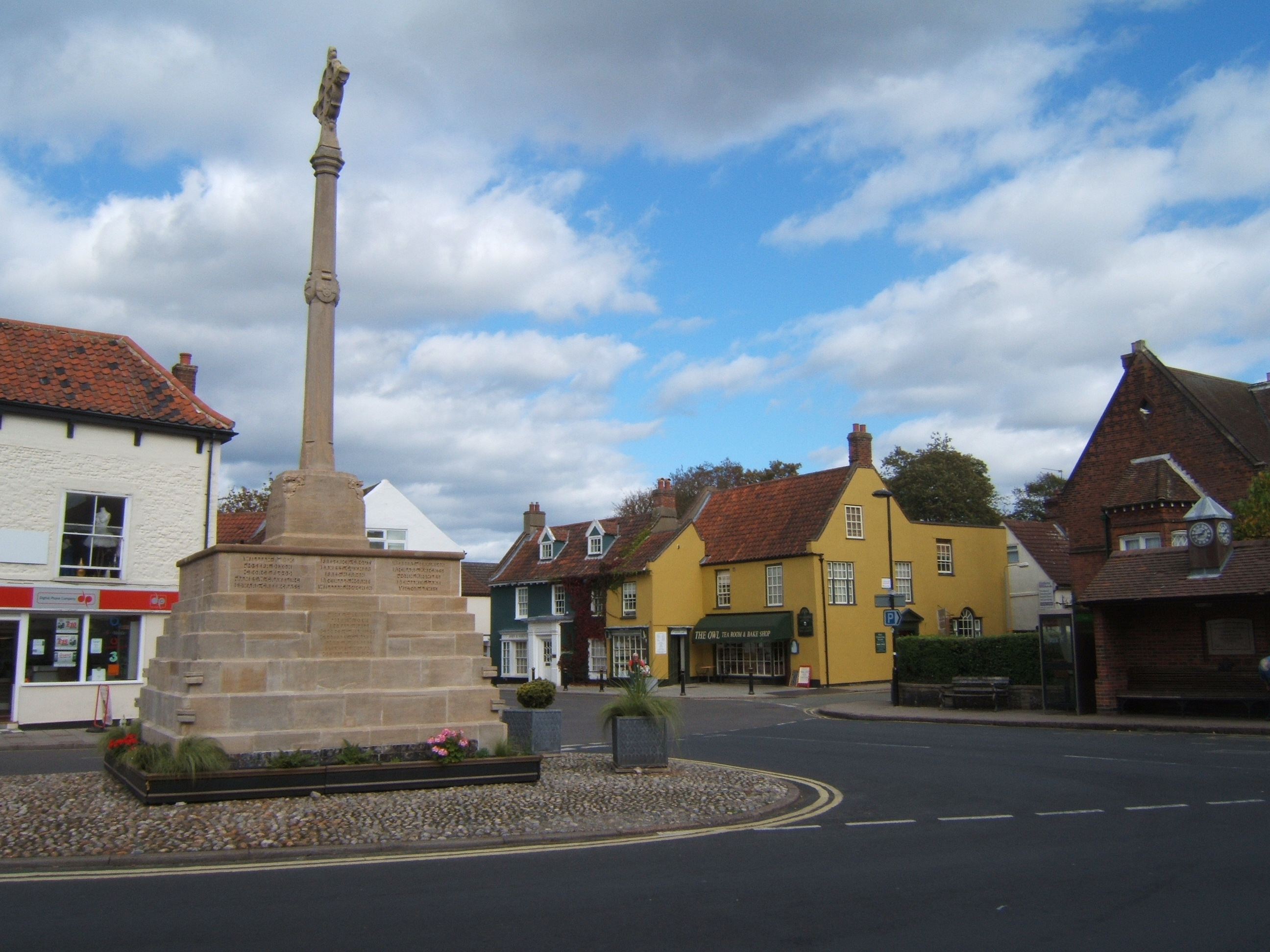
Holt, the fourth-largest town in the district

=== Political control ===
The council has been under Liberal Democrat majority control since 2019.

The first election to the council was held in 1973, initially operating as a shadow authority alongside the outgoing authorities until the new arrangements took effect on 1 April 1974. Political control of the council since 1974 has been as follows:

| Party in control | Years |
|---|---|
| Independent | 1974–1991 |
| No overall control | 1991–2003 |
| Liberal Democrats | 2003–2011 |
| Conservative | 2011–2017 |
| No overall control | 2017–2019 |
| Liberal Democrats | 2019–present |

=== Leadership ===
The leaders of the council since 2004 have been:

| Councillor | Party | From | To |
|---|---|---|---|
| John Sweeney | Liberal Democrats | | 2004 |
| Simon Partridge | Liberal Democrats | 2004 | 2008 |
| Virginia Gay | Liberal Democrats | 2008 | May 2011 |
| Helen Eales | Conservative | May 2011 | 30 May 2012 |
| Keith Johnson | Conservative | 30 May 2012 | 2 Dec 2012 |
| Tom FitzPatrick | Conservative | 19 Dec 2012 | 21 Feb 2018 |
| John Lee | Conservative | 21 Feb 2018 | 21 Nov 2018 |
| Sarah Bütikofer | Liberal Democrats | 21 Nov 2018 | 9 Feb 2022 |
| Tim Adams | Liberal Democrats | 9 Feb 2022 | |

=== Composition ===
Following the 2023 election, and subsequent by-elections and changes of allegiance up to July 2026, the composition of the council was:

| Party | Councillors |
|---|---|
| Liberal Democrats | 26 |
| Conservative | 11 |
| Independent | 3 |
| Total | 40 |

=== Elections ===
Since the last boundary changes in 2019 the council has comprised 40 councillors representing 32 wards, with each ward electing one or two councillors. Elections are held every four years.

=== Premises ===
The council is based at the Council Offices on Holt Road in Cromer. The building was purpose-built for the council and opened in 1990.

The council also operates an office at the Connect Centre in Fakenham, which is open to the public as a call in centre for council business.

== Geography ==
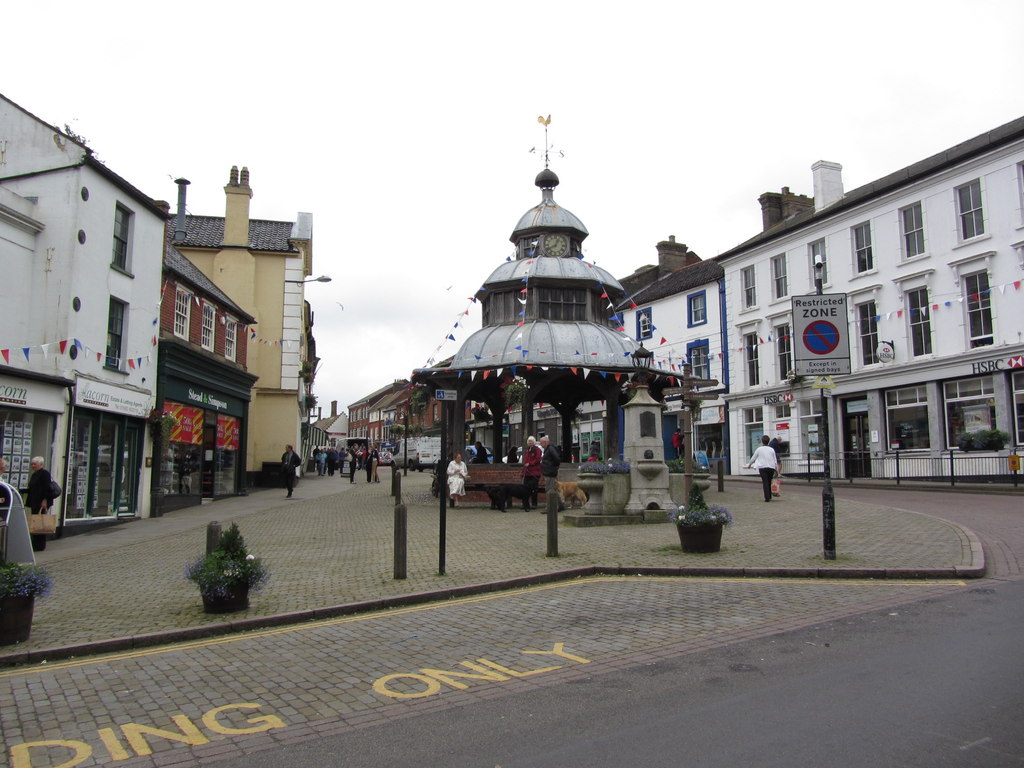
North Walsham, the largest settlement in the district

At the time of the 2001 census, the district had an area of 994 square kilometres (384 sq mi), with a population of 98,382 in 43,502 households.

== Demography ==
North Norfolk population pyramid

The 2021 census results found that the local authority area had the highest proportions of population over 65 in the England and Wales, at 33.5%.

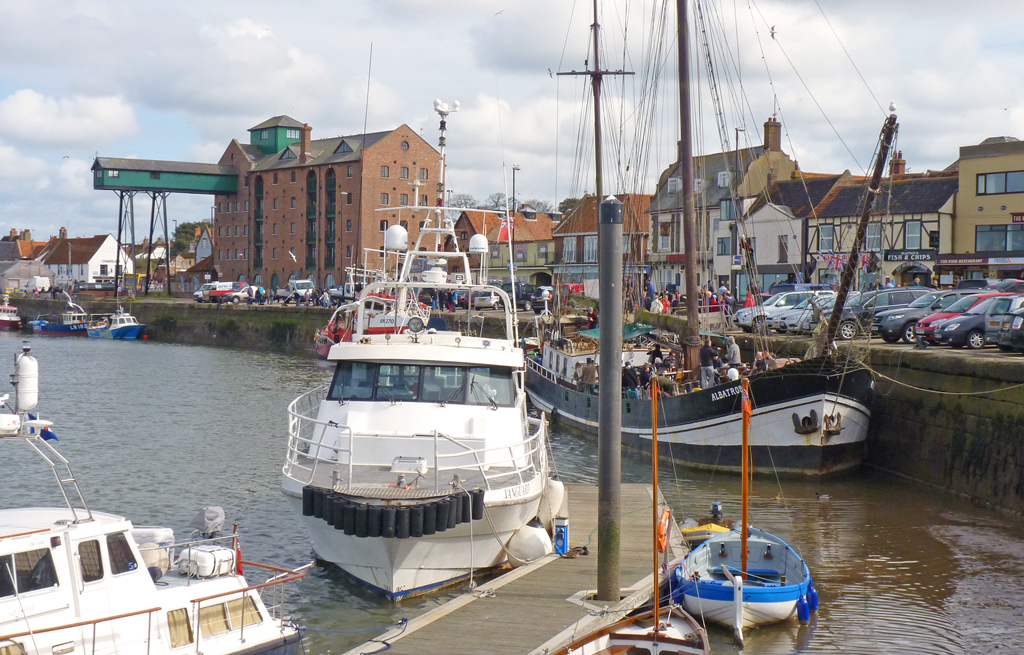
Wells-next-the-Sea, one of the many coastal towns in the county

== Towns and parishes ==
The district is entirely covered by 121 civil parishes. The parish councils for Cromer, Fakenham, Holt, North Walsham, Sheringham, Stalham and Wells-next-the-Sea have declared their parishes to be towns, allowing them to take the style "town council".

- Alby with Thwaite, Aldborough, Antingham, Ashmanhaugh, Aylmerton
- Baconsthorpe, Bacton, Barsham, Barton Turf, Beeston Regis, Binham, Blakeney, Bodham, Briningham, Brinton, Briston, Brumstead
- Catfield, Cley-Next-The-Sea, Colby, Corpusty, Cromer
- Dilham, Dunton
- East Beckham, East Ruston, Edgefield, Erpingham
- Fakenham, Felbrigg, Felmingham, Field Dalling, Fulmodeston
- Gimingham, Great Snoring, Gresham, Guestwick, Gunthorpe
- Hanworth, Happisburgh, Helhoughton, Hempstead, Hempton, Hickling, High Kelling, Hindolveston, Hindringham, Holkham, Holt, Honing, Horning, Horsey, Hoveton
- Ingham, Ingworth, Itteringham
- Kelling, Kettlestone, Knapton
- Langham, Lessingham, Letheringsett with Glandford, Little Barningham, Little Snoring, Ludham
- Matlaske, Melton Constable, Morston, Mundesley
- Neatishead, Northrepps, North Walsham
- Overstrand
- Paston, Plumstead, Potter Heigham, Pudding Norton
- East Raynham, West Raynham, South Raynham, Roughton, West Runton/East Runton, Ryburgh
- Salthouse, Scottow, Sculthorpe, Sea Palling, Sharrington, Sheringham, Sidestrand, Skeyton, Sloley, Smallburgh, Southrepps, Stalham, Stibbard, Stiffkey, Stody, Suffield, Sustead, Sutton, Swafield, Swanton Abbott, Swanton Novers
- Tatterford, Tattersett, Testerton, Thornage, Thorpe Market, Thurgarton, Thurning, Thursford, Trimingham, Trunch, Tunstead
- Upper Sheringham
- Walsingham, Warham, Wells-next-the-Sea, West Beckham, Westwick, Weybourne, Wickmere, Wighton, Witton, Wiveton, Wood Norton, Worstead

== Controversies ==
Almost £389,000 was given to the council's "joint head of paid services", Nick Baker, in the form of an "exit package", reported Private Eye in October 2020. This was £89,000 more than the council had spent purchasing dwellings to support homeless people in 2019/20, the Eastern Daily Press reported. The council's opposition leader, Christopher Cushing, was quoted describing the payment to Baker as "extraordinary". The Press also reported the total cost of so-called "golden goodbyes" for senior council staff had risen to £1.8 million.

== Media ==
=== Television ===
North Norfolk is served by BBC Look East and ITV News Anglia, BBC Look North and ITV News Calendar can also be received.

=== Radio ===
Radio stations are served by:

- BBC Radio Norfolk on 95.6 FM and 104.4 FM
- Heart East on 96.4 FM and 102.4 FM
- Greatest Hits Radio East (formerly North Norfolk Radio) on 96.2 FM and 103.2 FM
- Poppyland Community Radio, a community based station which broadcast online.

=== Newspapers ===
Local newspapers that cover the area are:

- North Norfolk News .
- Eastern Daily Press

== Cultural references ==
The 2013 film Alan Partridge: Alpha Papa was filmed in the area.

The World of Darkness parody web series, Hunter: The Parenting, is set in the area.
