= Nabil El-Nayal =

British fashion designer (born 1985)

Nabil El-Nayal, more commonly known as Nabil Nayal (born 1985 in Aleppo, Syria) is a Syrian-born British fashion designer. He moved to England at the age of 14 and has won awards including the Royal Society of Arts Award, the Graduate Fashion Week 'Best Womenswear' Award and the British Fashion Council MA Scholarship Award.

== Biography ==
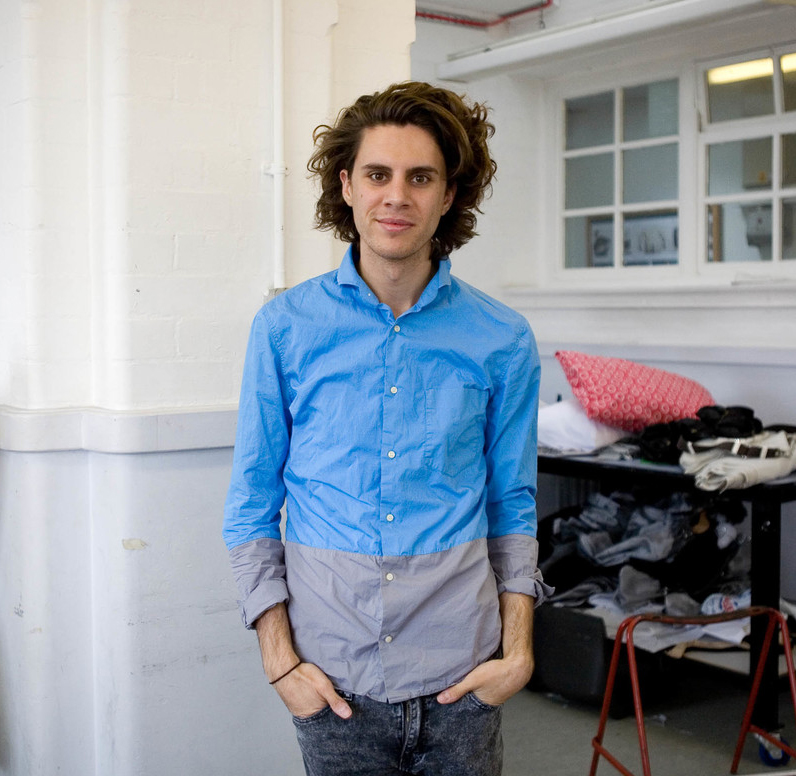
Nabil El-Nayal in 2011

El-Nayal was born in Syria and moved to England at the age of 14. He went on to win many prestigious awards including the Royal Society of Arts Award, the Graduate Fashion Week 'Best Womenswear' Award and the British Fashion Council MA Scholarship Award; enabling him to study at the Royal College of Art.

In 2008 he was invited by Christopher Bailey to work as ’Researcher Reporting to the Creative Director’ at Burberry Prorsum and in 2009 River Island commissioned him to create a capsule collection which sold out in 3 days. Nabil’s entire MA collection was purchased by Harrods as part of the 2010 Harrods Launches platform and he was invited to the Buckingham Palace Reception for the British Clothing Industry where he met Queen Elizabeth II. At this time Nabil worked alongside David Sassoon as Assistant Designer at Bellville Sassoon and in 2011 he made his London Fashion Week debut as a semi-finalist in Colin McDowell's Fashion Fringe competition, attracting high-profile supporters such as Claudia Schiffer, Lady Gaga, Florence Welch & Rihanna.

In July 2018, El-Nayal graduated with a PhD in Fashion from Manchester Metropolitan University, Fashion Institute. His thesis was titled ‘Disruption as a Generative Principle in Fashion Design. The ‘Elizabethan Sportswear’ Collections of Nabil Nayal’. In September 2018 the brand delivered their debut presentation on the official London Fashion Week schedule and was the first brand to host a LFW show at the British Library. The SS19 collection incorporated rare Elizabethan archives into the collection, including the Tilbury speech by Elizabeth I. In February 2019, the brand's showed their AW19 collection at London Fashion Week, with inspiration from Marie Antoinette.

In April 2019, 'The Library Collection' launched at Selfridges London. In May 2019 he won the 2019 BFC Fashion Trust Grant.

== Notable clients ==
His clothes have been worn by Lady Gaga, Claudia Schiffer and Lorde. Karl Lagerfeld commissioned Nabil to make a shirt for his muse and collaborator Amanda Harlech, who then styled and photographed Jerry Hall wearing it for the V Magazine 100 issue.

== Awards ==
El-Nayal has received awards including:

- Royal Society of Arts Award 2008
- Graduate Fashion Week 'Best Womenswear' Award 2008
- British Fashion Council MA Scholarship Award – for the Royal College of Art 2008
- Crown Paint 2009 (interior design competition)
- Harrods Launches 2010
- Fashion Fringe Semi-Finalist 2011
- LVMH Prize shortlist 2015
- LVMH Prize finalist 2017
- BFC Fashion Trust Grant and Mentoring 2019
