= Thomas Coke, 8th Earl of Leicester =

British peer (born 1965)

The Right Honourable The Earl of Leicester
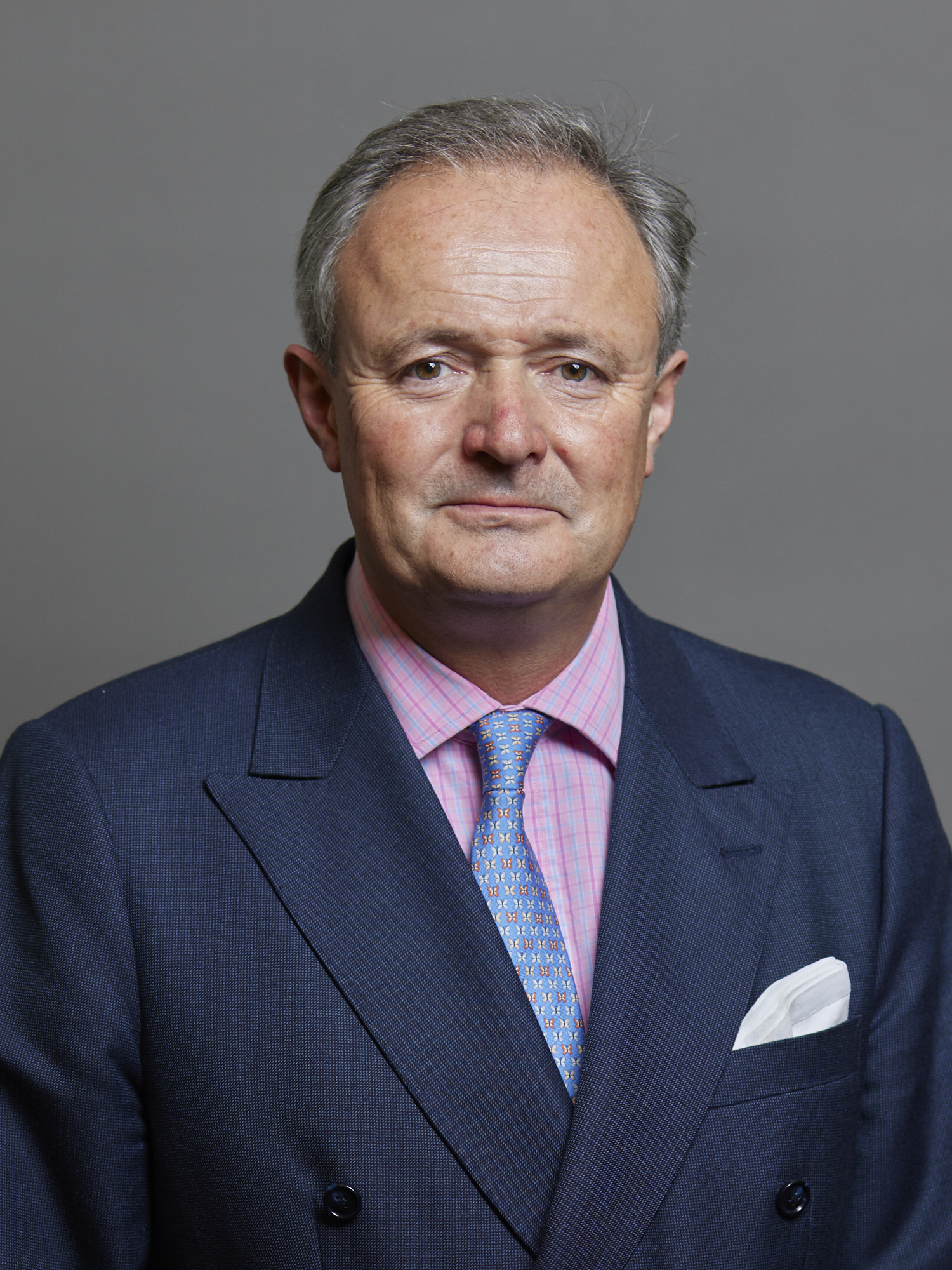
- Official portrait, 2021

Member of the House of Lords
- Lord Temporal
- Elected Hereditary Peer; 23 June 2021 – 29 April 2026
- By-election: 2021
- Preceded by: The 2nd Baron Denham

Personal details
- Born: Thomas Edward Coke; 6 July 1965 (age 61) Epping, Essex, England
- Party: Conservative
- Spouse: Polly Maria Whately (m. 1996)
- Children: 4
- Parent(s): Edward Coke, 7th Earl of Leicester; Valeria Phyllis Potter
- Occupation: Politician and peer

Thomas Edward Coke, 8th Earl of Leicester (born 6 July 1965), is the son of Edward Coke, 7th Earl of Leicester, and Valeria Phyllis Potter. He is the current Earl of Leicester. From 1994 to 2015, when he succeeded into the earldom, he was styled Viscount Coke.

== Education and career ==
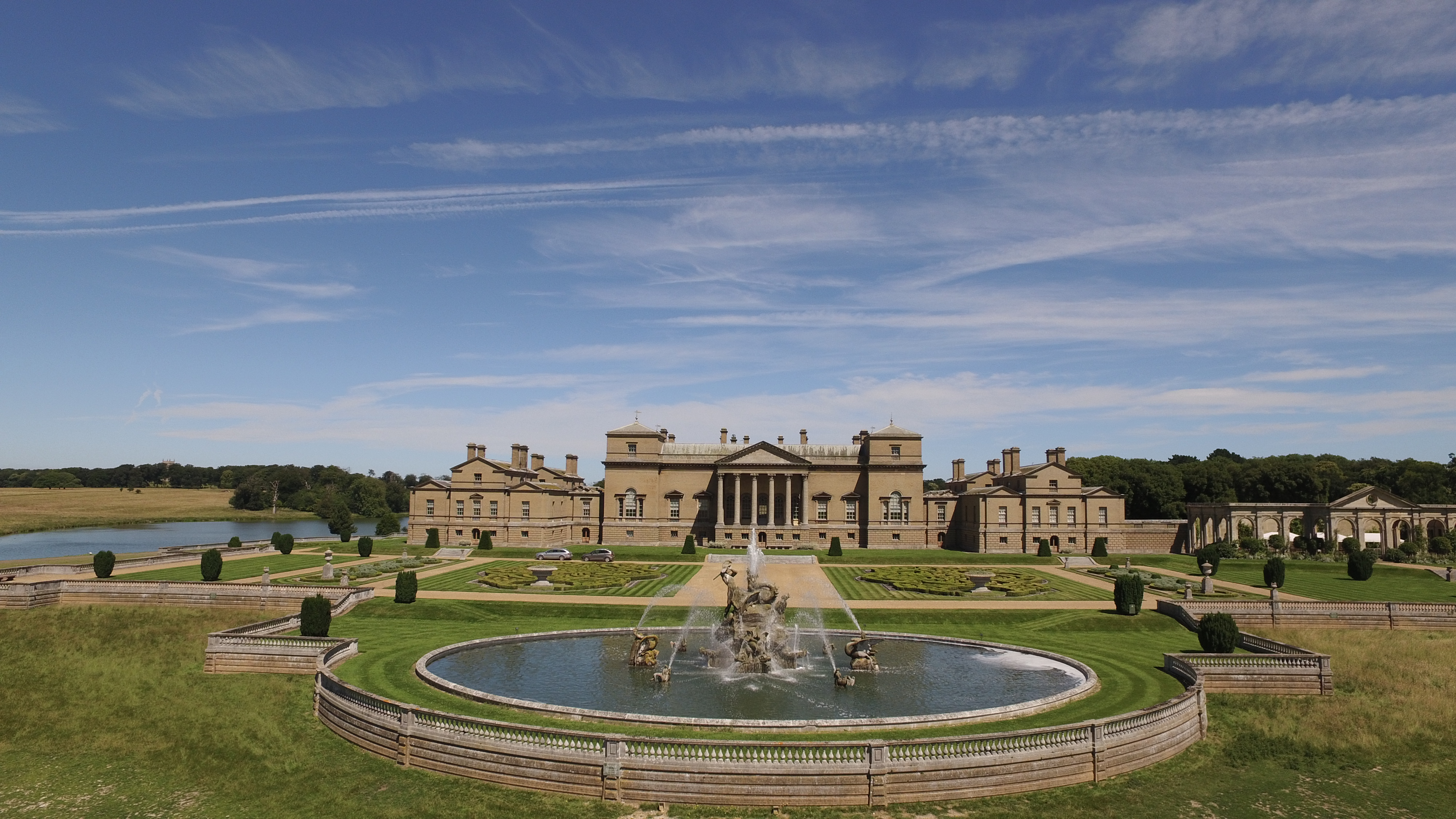
Holkham Hall, Norfolk

Lord Leicester was educated at Beeston Hall School and Eton College. Between 1979 and 1981, he was the Page of Honour to Queen Elizabeth II. He graduated from the University of Manchester with a Bachelor of Arts in the History of Art. In 1987, he was commissioned into the Scots Guards. Between 1991 and 1993, he served as Equerry to the Duke of Kent. He now runs the family estate at Holkham Hall. In 2021, he won a by-election to the House of Lords as a member of the Conservative Party, taking the oath on 20 July 2021.

== Marriage and family ==
Lord Leicester was married on 21 December 1996 to Polly Maria Whately (born 1967), youngest daughter of the financier David Whately and his wife Belinda Bellville, of the designers Bellville Sassoon. Lady Leicester, through her mother, is a first cousin of the interior designer Cath Kidston. She is a milliner by profession.

They have one son and three daughters together:

- Lady Hermione Belinda Coke (born 29 December 1998)
- Lady Juno Carey Coke (born 21 October 2000)
- Edward Horatio Coke, Viscount Coke (born 11 June 2003)
- Lady Elizabeth Coke (born 7 January 2006)

Court offices
Preceded by John Ponsonby	Page of Honour; 1979–1981	Succeeded by James Basset
Peerage of the United Kingdom
Preceded by Edward Coke	Earl of Leicester; 7th creation 2015–present	Incumbent; Heir apparent: Edward Coke, Viscount Coke
Parliament of the United Kingdom
Preceded by The Lord Denham	Elected hereditary peer to the House of Lords under the House of Lords Act 1999; 2021–2026	Position abolished under the House of Lords (Hereditary Peers) Act 2026
