= St Mary de Pratis =

English monasteries dedicated to Mary, mother of Jesus

St Mary de Pratis or St Mary de la Pré, meaning St Mary of the Meadows or St Mary in the Meadow may refer to one of a number of former abbeys or priories established in England, primarily in the 12th century. Most were in the Midlands, England.

Abbey/Priory	Image	Location	Religious Order	Established	Dissolved	Notes
Beeston Priory		Beeston Regis, Norfolk; SP759592	Augustinian Canons (male)	1216	1538	Beeston was a small independent priory, recorded in 1535 as having only 1 prior and 4 cannons, who served as the preachers at local churches. The priory operated as a boys school, with both boarding and day students. Following dissolution the stone from the abbey was used to build the 18th century Priory Farmhouse, the gardens of which the ruins are located in today.
Delapré Abbey		Near Northampton; SP759592	Cluniac Nuns	c. 1145	1538	Delapré was one of only two Cluniac monasteries of women built in England. Following dissolution the Abbey buildings served as a family home before being acquired by Northampton County Council in the 20th century and converted to serve as the County Records Office; a role it served until 1992. The council are currently searching for a long term use for the site.
King's Mead Priory		Near Derby; SK34433668	Benedictine Nuns	c. 1160	1536	King's Mead was one of a number of smaller priories established in and around the town of Derby in the 12th century. As the only Benedictine nunnery in Derbyshire, it became a popular place for the local nobility to educate their daughters. Following dissolution the land was sold several times, before being developed into residential streets in the 19th century.
Leicester Abbey		Leicester; SK5849206040	Augustinian Canons (male)	c. 1143	1538	Leicester Abbey is famous as the place of death of Cardinal Thomas Wolsey in 1530. It was the richest abbey (by income) in the county, with an income of £951 in 1534. Following dissolution the abbey was dismantled and the stones used to construct a manor house for the Marquess of Northampton. This house (now in ruins) would become known as Cavendish House follow its sale to the Earls, later Dukes, of Devonshire. In 1925 the abbey and 32 acres of parkland were donated to Leicester Council and are currently open as a public park.
