= Priory of St Mary in the Meadow, Beeston Regis =

Priory in Norfolk, England

St Mary in the Meadow Priory, Beeston Regis
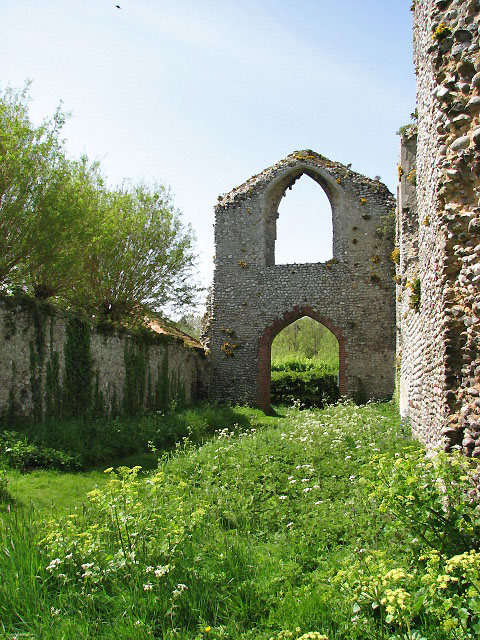

- Location within Norfolk

Monastery information
- Full name: The Priory of St Mary in the Meadow, Beeston Regis
- Other name: Beeston Priory
- Order: Augustinian Order
- Established: 1216
- Disestablished: 1538
- Dedication: St Mary in the Meadow

People
- Founder: Margery de Cressy

Architecture
- Heritage designation: English Heritage

Site
- Location: Beeston Regis, Norfolk
- Coordinates: 52.938772°N 1.224176°E
- Grid reference: TG1675642801
- Visible remains: Ruins: open to the public

The Priory of St Mary in the Meadow, also known as Beeston Priory, is a former Augustinian Priory, located in the village of Beeston Regis, Norfolk, United Kingdom.

== History ==
The priory was founded in 1216 by Margery de Cressy, and was dedicated to St Mary in the Meadow (or St Mary de Pratis). Unlike many small houses of the Augustinian Order, Beeston Priory was independent.

The priory's canons served as parish priests for nearby churches, whilst also running a boys' school at the priory for both boarding and day students.

The priory was originally endowed with 40 acres (160,000 m^{2}) of land, and was given the rights to wrecks and flotsam and jetsam. Within the monastic precinct there were agricultural buildings and probably a smithy, a brewery, a guest-house, a wash-house, latrines and other buildings necessary for the running of the busy local community.

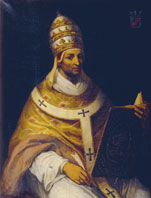
Pope John XXII who absolved Canon John de Walsam after attacking the Bishop of Norwich

In 1317, a canon at the priory, John de Walsam, attacked the Bishop (most probably John Salmon, the Bishop of Norwich) with a sword. After the matter was referred to Pope John XXII, de Walsam was sent to Rome. As the Bishop had recovered, the pope absolved de Walsam and instructed the Bishop to arrange for him to perform penance.

In 1291 the priory was inspected for tax and was recorded as having an annual value of £25 5s. 10¼d for its possessions in Norfolk, and £2 10s. 10½d for those in Suffolk.

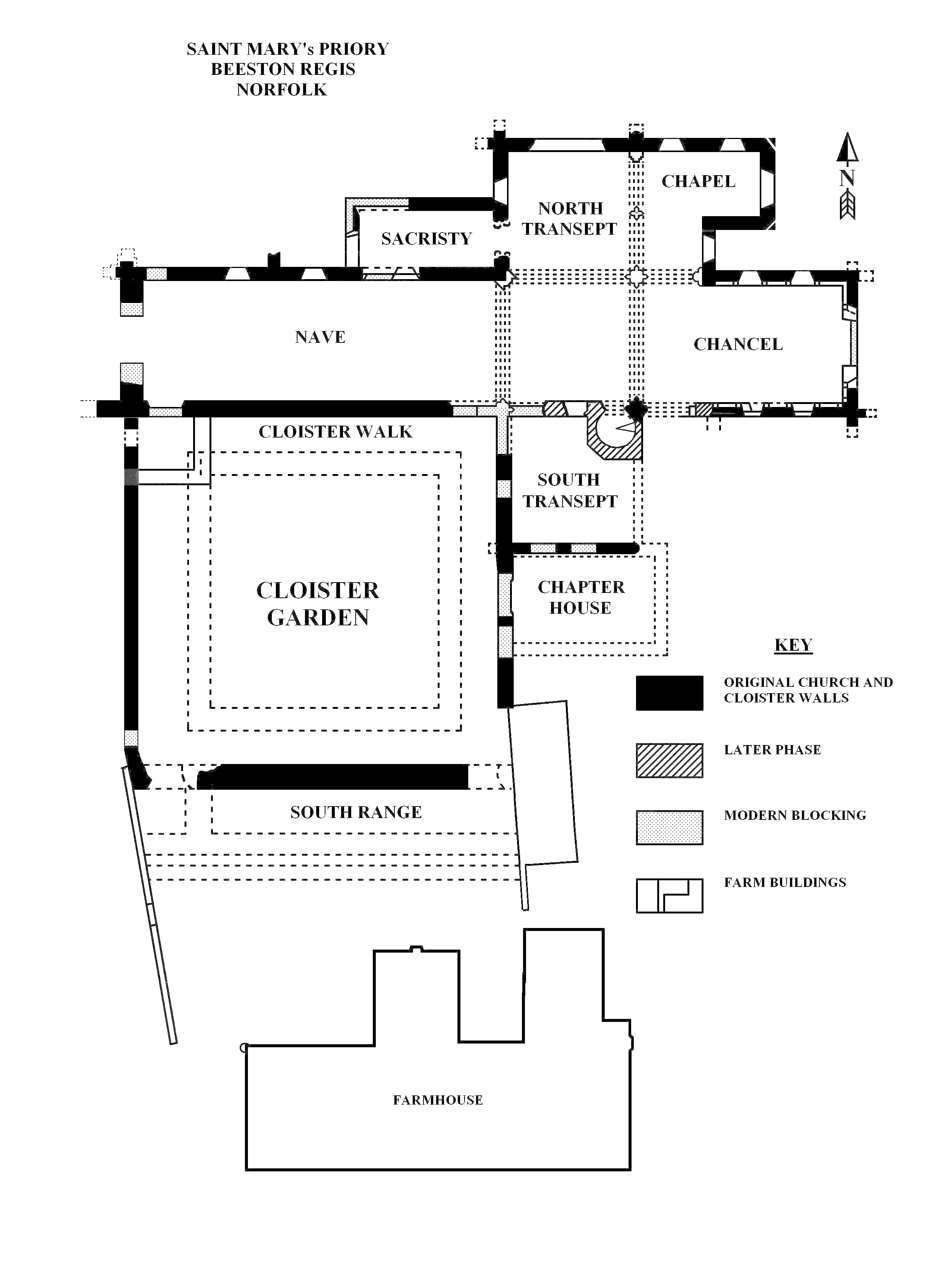
Plan of the Priory

On 25 August 1494 the priory was visited by James Goldwell, Bishop of Norwich. This visit revealed that, although there were other priests present, the Prior, John Poty, was the only canon at the priory, as the other, Thomas Taverner, had gone "absent without leave". Bishop Goldwell instructed Prior Poty to find two new canons as soon as possible.

The abbey was visited again on 18 July 1514, this time by Richard Nykke, Bishop of Norwich. Canon Thomas Taverner was again absent without leave, but was thought to have been in Norwich. The other canons were listed as Canon Nicholas Wodforth, Canon Robins, Canon Daume and Canon Rump. This visit revealed potential financial impropriety as the Prior would not produce the priory's accounts. Other concerns were that the school was not operational, and that matins were not being said at the right time.

Bishop Richard Nykke visited the priory again in August 1532, on the election of Prior Richard Hudson. He found all the accounts and affairs at the priory to be in order.

The Valor Ecclesiasticus of 1535 lists the priory as having an income, after expenses, of £43 2s. 4¾d., and debts of £20. The priory is recorded as being in good repair and was home to the prior and three canons, six boys (boarding at the school) and seven servants. The lead and bells at the priory were valued at £60, more than the annual income of the establishment.

The priory avoided immediate suppression when Prior Richard Hudson and his four canons, Nicholas Wodforth, William Wusbarow, James Fysser, and Robert Swyer accepted King Henry VIII's supremacy over the church. The priory was finally dissolved in 1538, at which time Prior Hudson was awarded an annual pension of £5 (which he was still in receipt of as late as 1553).

The suppression of the Priory and its school left no local provision for education. This is believed to have led Sir John Gresham to found Gresham's School at nearby Holt in 1555.

Writing to Thomas Cromwell in March 1538, Sir Richard Rich said that the canons at the priory "pretended themselves to be friars"; several historical documents have picked up on this and mistakenly referred to the priory as a friary.

The Priory and its possessions were leased by The Crown to John Travers in 1540 before being awarded, in 1545, to Sir Edmund Wyndham and Giles Seafoule.

== The Priory ruins today ==
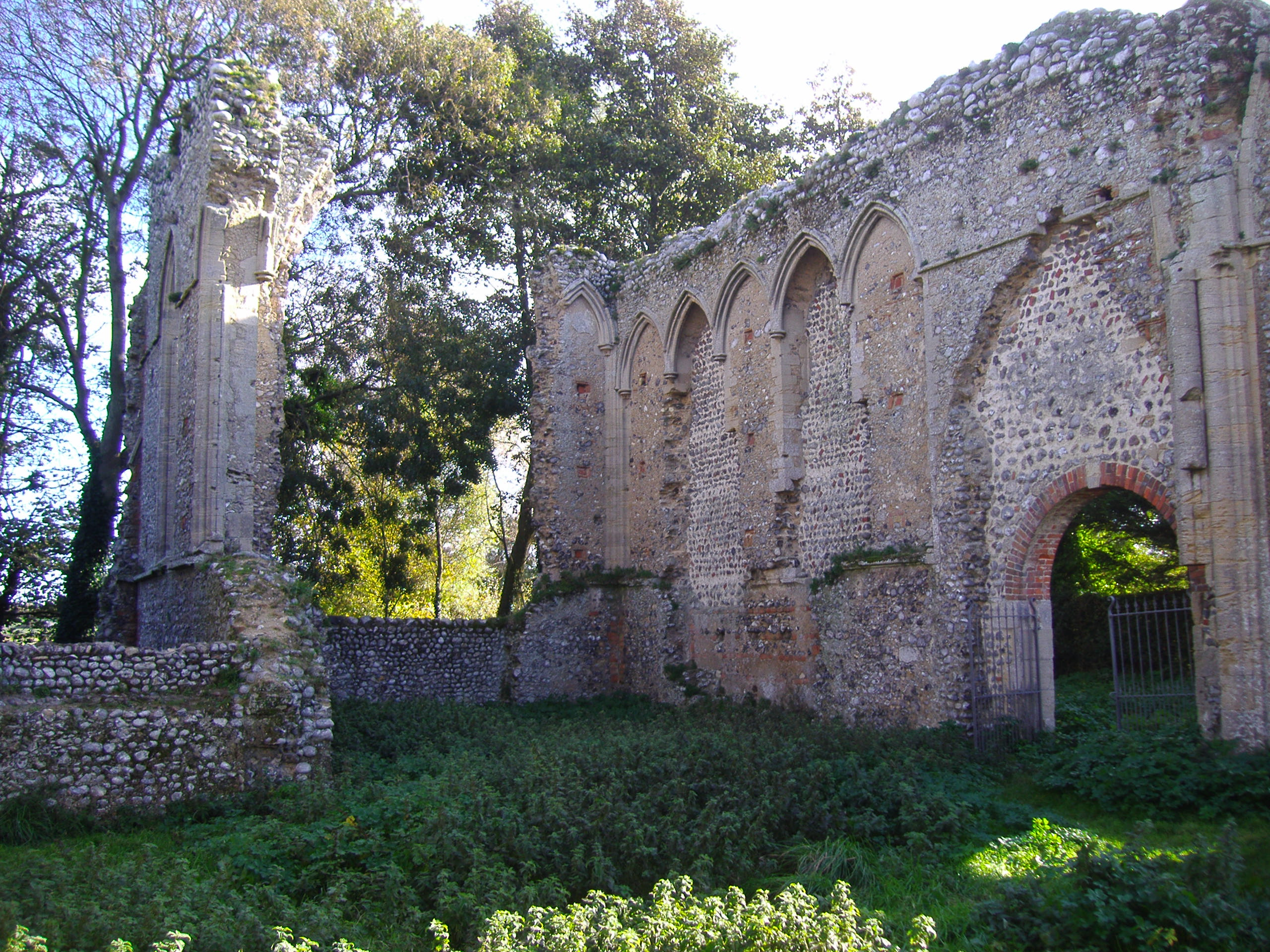
The ruins of St Mary's Priory, Beeston Regis

Much remains of the main priory church. The ruins indicate that the church nave, from the west wall to the transept, was about 75 feet (23 m) long, and 23 feet (7.0 m) wide, having a chancel added later. The north wall of the nave still stands practically to the roof level, although the divisions between the windows have long gone. The chancel, at the eastern end of the ruin, remains to roof height on the north and south side. The original eastern wall has been demolished, but a flint wall has been built up to window-sill level. The north-east corner still has most of its window mouldings.

The cloister, to the south of the nave of the priory church, is now part of the Priory Farm garden. To the east of the cloister, still standing, are part of the walls of the chapter house, and also some traces of the dormitory. The refectory and other domestic buildings probably are beneath or have been incorporated into the 18th-century Priory Farmhouse, which was probably built from materials from the demolition of the early buildings.

The belfry tower has gone, although the first steps can be seen in a doorway in the south wall. The south wall is only as high as the window-sill level. The west wall is standing almost intact to gable height, although the lining of the original door has been replaced by modern brickwork.

The north transept is 24 feet (7.3 m) long and 24 feet (7.3 m) wide. The east wall of the transept is entirely gone, except for traces of its junction with the north wall. At the south end of this wall once stood a pillar; the opposite pillar, west of the south door, is almost complete and in a good state of preservation. Also in the transept there is a doorway which leads to what is thought to be a sacristy, and is the only doorway remaining in its original form.

West of the transept there is a small chapel 23 feet (7.0 m) long and 12 feet (3.7 m) wide.

There also remain three monastic ponds close by.

The site is owned and protected by Norfolk County Council, who have opened the ruins to the public.

== Priors of Saint Mary's, Beeston Regis ==
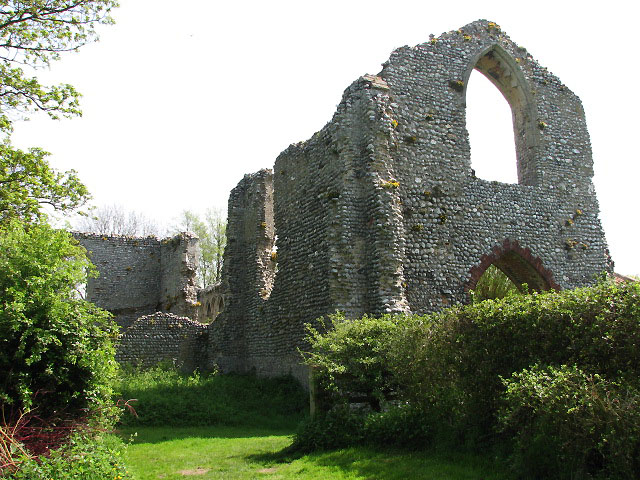
The ruins of Beeston Priory

An incomplete list of Priors of St Mary's Priory:

- Roger, c.1267
- Thomas, c.1297
- William de Beston, 1314-1325
- Geoffrey de Hoton, elected 1325
- Simon de Calthorpe, 1390-1409
- Laurence de Beeston, 1409-1416
- Geoffrey de Runton, elected 1416 & 1435
- John Poty, 1444-1461
- John Catteson, 1461-1468
- John Wykmer, 1468
- Simon Robyns, 1531
- Richard Hudson, 1532-1538

The last Prior and his four canons all subscribed to the Act of Supremacy 1534 and were granted pensions. Richard Hudson became Rector of Newton Flotman, Norfolk.

== The Priory Maze ==
Near the priory is the Priory Maze, a popular tourist attraction that includes a cafe-restaurant and a garden centre. The microclimate in this part of Norfolk enables the owners to grow a collection of rare and exotic plants.
