= Belinda Bellville =

British fashion designer

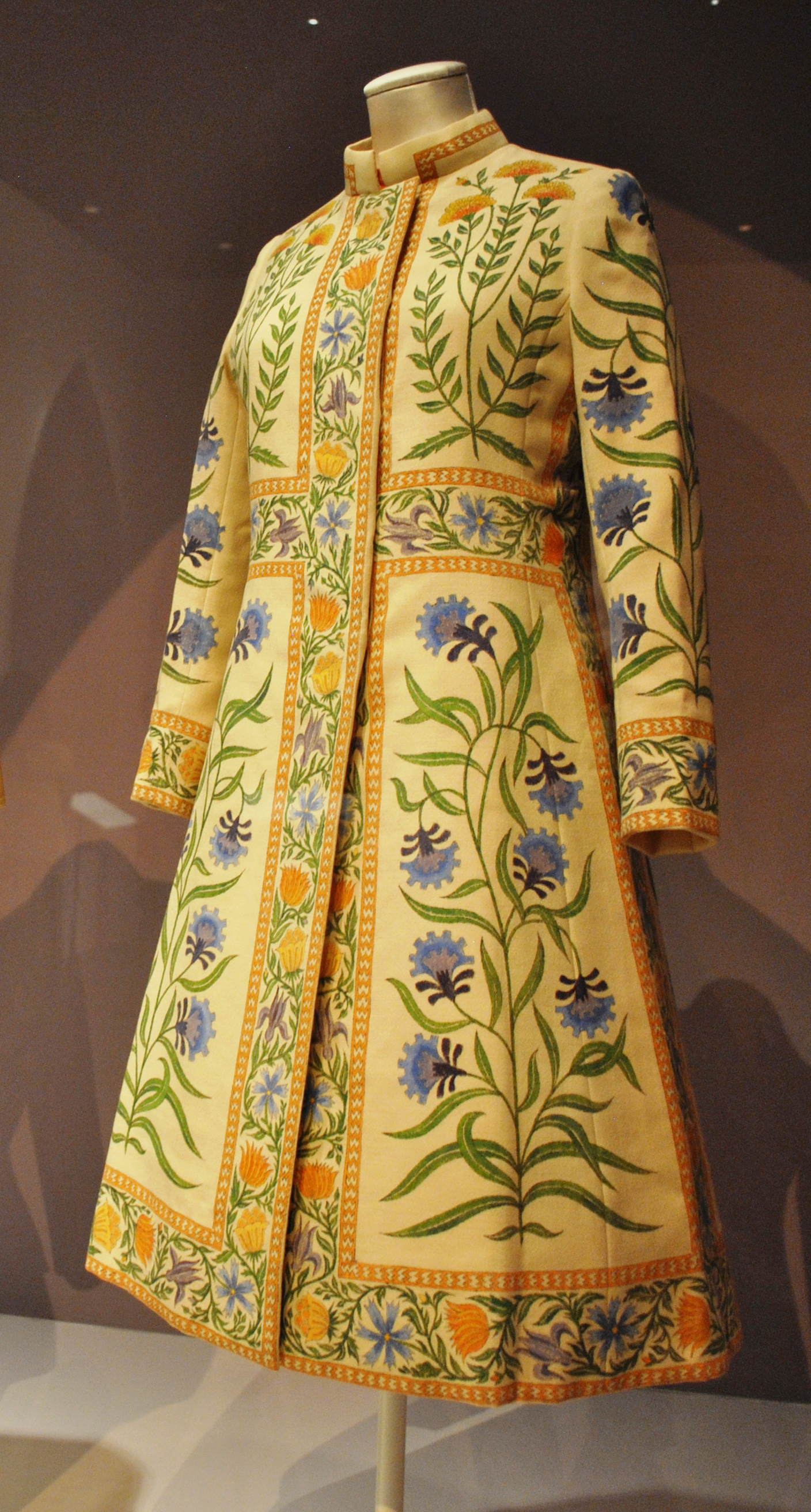
- Bellville Sassoon coat, hand-painted by Richard Cawley, 1970–71
- Born: 29 March 1930
- Died: 5 May 2024 (aged 94)
- Occupation: Fashion designer
- Relatives: Glen Kidston (uncle)

Belinda Bellville (29 March 1930 – 5 May 2024) was a British fashion designer, and the co-founder in 1953 (with David Sassoon) of Bellville Sassoon.

== Early life ==
She was born on 29 March 1930, the daughter of Anthony Seymour Bellville (1902–1970) and Audrey Dorothy C Kidston (1906–1997), who was the younger sister of the racing driver and aviator Glen Kidston (1899–1931). In 1940, her mother Audrey married Hon. Peter Pleydell-Bouverie, son of Jacob Pleydell-Bouverie, 6th Earl of Radnor.

== Personal life ==
In 1952, she married David Whately, a partner in a company that made mobiles and abstract sculptures for advertising, and was later a financier. He died in 2008. They had three daughters together.

Their daughter Polly Whately married Thomas Coke, 8th Earl of Leicester.

== Death ==
She died on 5 May 2024, aged 94.
