= David Sassoon (designer) =

British fashion designer (1932–2025)

- Born: 5 October 1932; Highbury, North London, England
- Died: 9 April 2025 (aged 92); London, England
- Occupation: Fashion designer
- Years active: 1958–2012
- Known for: Co-ownership of Bellville Sassoon

David Sassoon (5 October 1932 – 9 April 2025) was a British fashion designer and the owner of the Bellville Sassoon salon in Knightsbridge, London, founded by Belinda Bellville in 1953.

== Early life and education ==
Born in Highbury, London on 5 October 1932 to Iraqi Armenian parents Gourgi and Victoria Sassoon, Sassoon grew up in North London and initially intended to become an actor but turned to fashion when his father disapproved. He attended Avigdor High School and Lauderdale Road Synagogue in West London.

== Career ==
Sassoon was invited by Belinda Bellville to join her salon in 1958 and in 1970 it became the Bellville Sassoon. After Bellville retired in the 1980s, Sassoon ran the salon with Lorcan Mullany. Sassoon retired in 2012 at the age of 80.

In 2023, it was announced that some of Sassoon's designs would be featured in an exhibition on the role of Jewish designers in London's fashion scene.

=== Notable clients ===
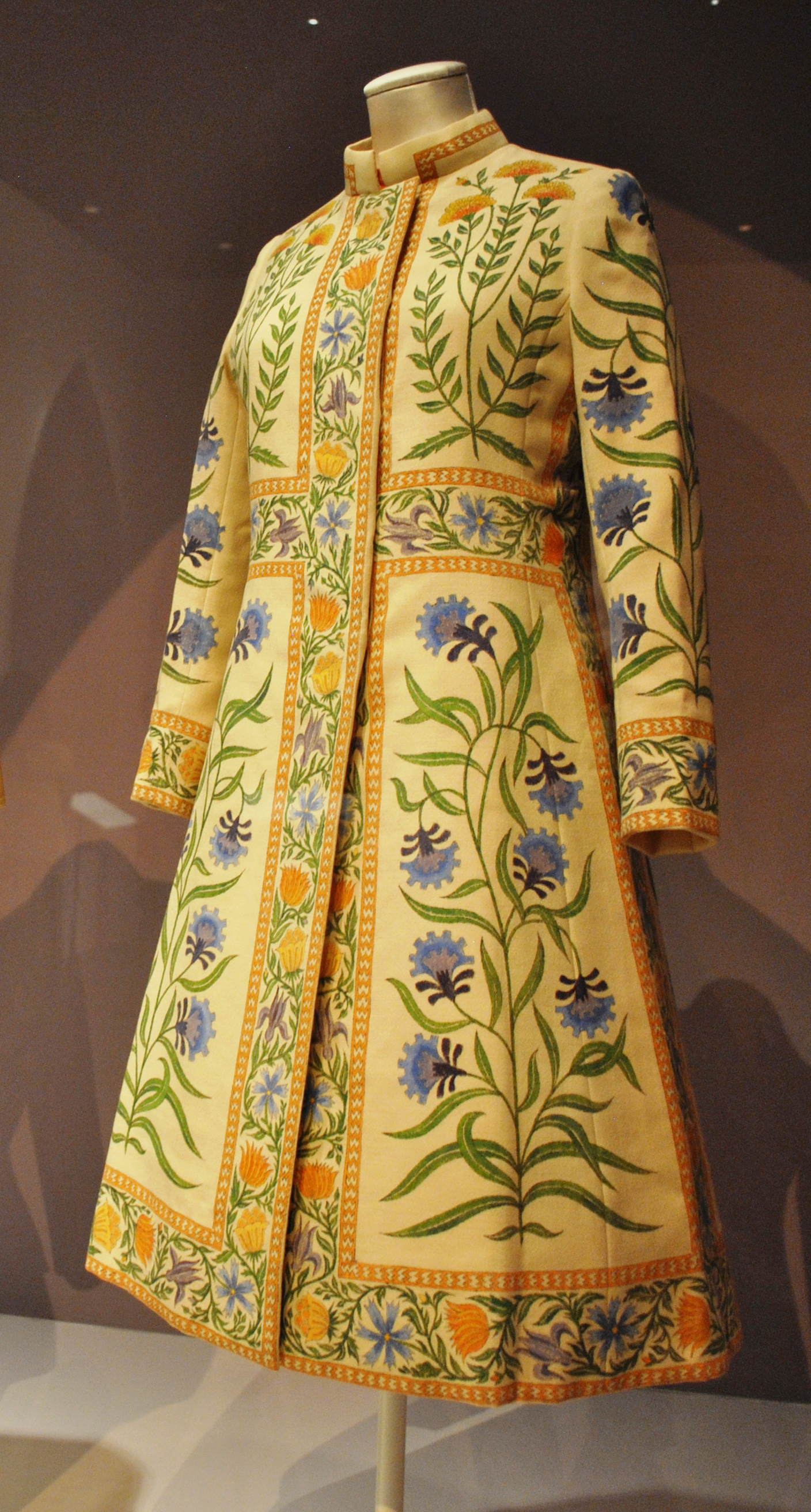
Bellville Sassoon coat, hand-painted by Richard Cawley, 1970–1971

He counted numerous socialites and members of the royal family amongst his clientele. He was the most prolific of Princess Diana's early designers, having designed over 70 outfits for her. Sassoon said of Diana, "When she got engaged, her mother brought her in to us and asked us to make the going-away outfit." Aside from Diana, Sassoon designed clothes for Princess Margaret, Princess Michael of Kent, the Duchess of York, the Duchess of Gloucester, Jackie Kennedy, Audrey Hepburn, Elizabeth Taylor and Jerry Hall. His designs appeared on the covers of Vogue and Harper's Bazaar. Sassoon claimed that he was "probably the only designer around today who has dressed every female member of the royal family except the Queen."

== Death ==
Sassoon died in London on 9 April 2025, at the age of 92. His death was confirmed by fellow fashion designer Zandra Rhodes.
