= Beeston Hall School =

Independent preparatory school in Beeston Regis, Norfolk

Coordinates: 52.9374°N 1.2341°E

- Beeston Regis, Norfolk, NR27 9NQ; United Kingdom

Information
- Type: Private school Day and boarding school
- Motto: Floreat Fiducia (Let confidence flourish)
- Religious affiliation: Church of England
- Established: 1948
- Founder: Thomas Tapping
- Department for Education URN: 121231 Tables
- Chairman of Governors: The Earl of Leicester
- Headmaster: Dougal Lyons
- Gender: Coeducational
- Age: 2 to 13
- Enrolment: 180~
- Houses: 4
- Colours: Blue and sky blue
- Former pupils: Old Beestonians
- Website: https://www.beestonhall.org.uk/

Beeston Hall School is an independent day and boarding pre-prep and preparatory school for boys and girls in the village of Beeston Regis, near Sheringham in Norfolk, England. Founded in 1948, Beeston Hall accommodates 180 pupils aged 2 – 13 making it the largest boarding preparatory school in East Anglia.

In April 2026, Beeston Hall won 'Great Country Prep', featured in The Week newspaper.

In September 2026, Beeston opened a new 2+ years funded-hours Nursery with capacity for 20 places.

Tatler Magazine also reviewed Beeston as one of the best schools in the country.

== History ==
Part of Beeston Hall date back to Tudor times, but more recently was the family home of the Wyndham Ketton-Cremers on the Beeston Regis Estate. Beeston Regis Estate was part of the much larger Felbrigg Estate, the family seat.

In 1940, a German bomb hit the building, causing slight damage.

The Hall was leased to Thomas Tapping and his wife Bessie, who opened the private Beeston Hall School in 1948. In 1967, the school became an incorporated trust, and in 1970, following the death of Robert Wyndham Ketton-Cremer, the last squire of Felbrigg, the school acquired the freehold and about 14 acres (5.7 ha) of land.

Over the years, the school has expanded and become the biggest employer in the parish. It has also acquired other surrounding land including Beeston Hall Common, which it purchased from the parish of Beeston Regis.

== Present school ==
The school is currently split into two parts;

- Pre-Prep (ages 4 – 6)
- Prep (ages 7 – 13)

Its pupils take the Common Entrance Examination, going on to a range of public schools such as Oundle, Uppingham, Oakham, Rugby, Harrow, Radley, Eton, Tudor Hall, Norwich High School, Gresham’s, The Leys and Stowe.

In April 2026, 71% of Year 8 leavers secured scholarships to their schools of choice, including Gordonstoun, Gresham's, Norwich School, Norwich High School for Girls, Oundle, Rugby and Uppingham.

There are four school houses: Danes, Normans, Romans and Vikings each with corresponding colours.

Pupils take part in inter-house events including music, quizzes, hockey, rugby, swimming, tennis, athletics and cross-country running.

House name and Colours
Danes – Green
Normans – Blue
Romans – Red
Vikings – Yellow

== Sports and activities ==
Children play sport every afternoon for at least an hour with matches against other schools/clubs mainly on Wednesday and Saturday afternoons. The main sports are rugby, hockey, tennis, cricket and netball and children can also take part in swimming, athletics, cross-country, fencing, shooting, sailing and golf.

The School’s facilities include 25 acres of grass pitches, a full-size AstroTurf pitch, all-weather (floodlit) netball and tennis courts, an indoor shooting range, a sports hall (large enough for three indoor cricket nets), an outdoor heated 20m swimming pool, four cricket squares in the summer and outdoor cricket nets.

== Boarding ==
Beeston Hall has a boarding house offering flexi and full-boarding for local, regional and international students from year groups 4-8.

== Headmasters ==
- 1948 – 1958: Thomas Tapping
- 1960 – 1986: Martin Swindells
- 1986 – 1998: John Elder
- 1998 – 2009: Innes MacAskill
- 2009 – May 2016: Robin Gainher
- May 2016 – July 2016: Tim Morton (acting headmaster)
- 2016 – 2026: Fred de Falbe
- 2026: Dougal Lyon
