= Beeston Beck (Norfolk) =

Minor watercourse in the north of the county of Norfolk, England

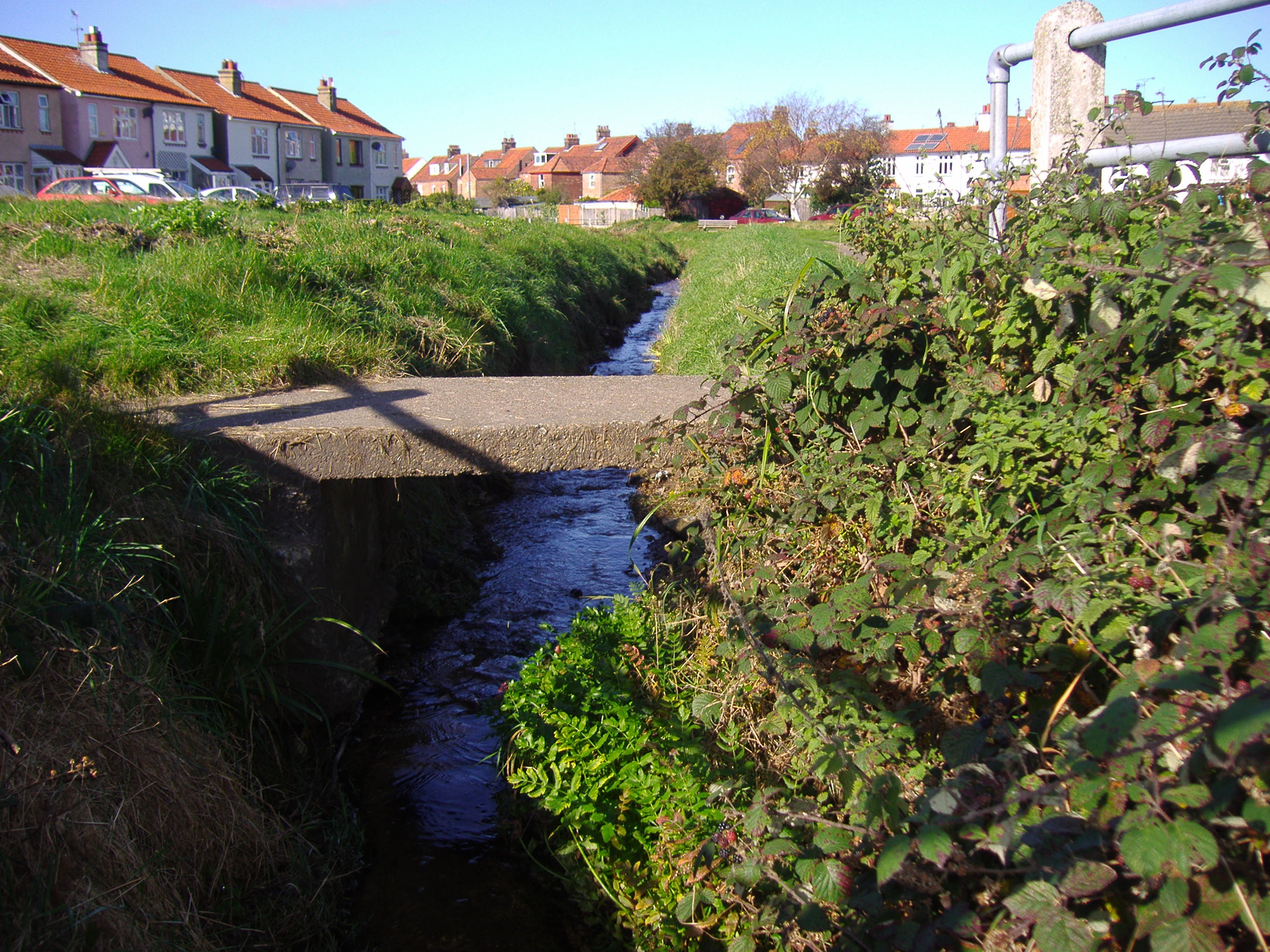
- Beeston Beck at Sheringham Back Common

- Beeston Beck Within North Norfolk

Location
- Country: England
- State: Norfolk
- Region: East of England
- District: North Norfolk

Physical characteristics
- Source: Sheringham Woods
- Mouth: East Beach, Sheringham
  - coordinates: 52°56′43″N 1°12′49″E
- Length: 1.437 mi (2.313 km)
- watermills Sheringham Watermill(Paper & Corn) Total Fall meters from source to merger

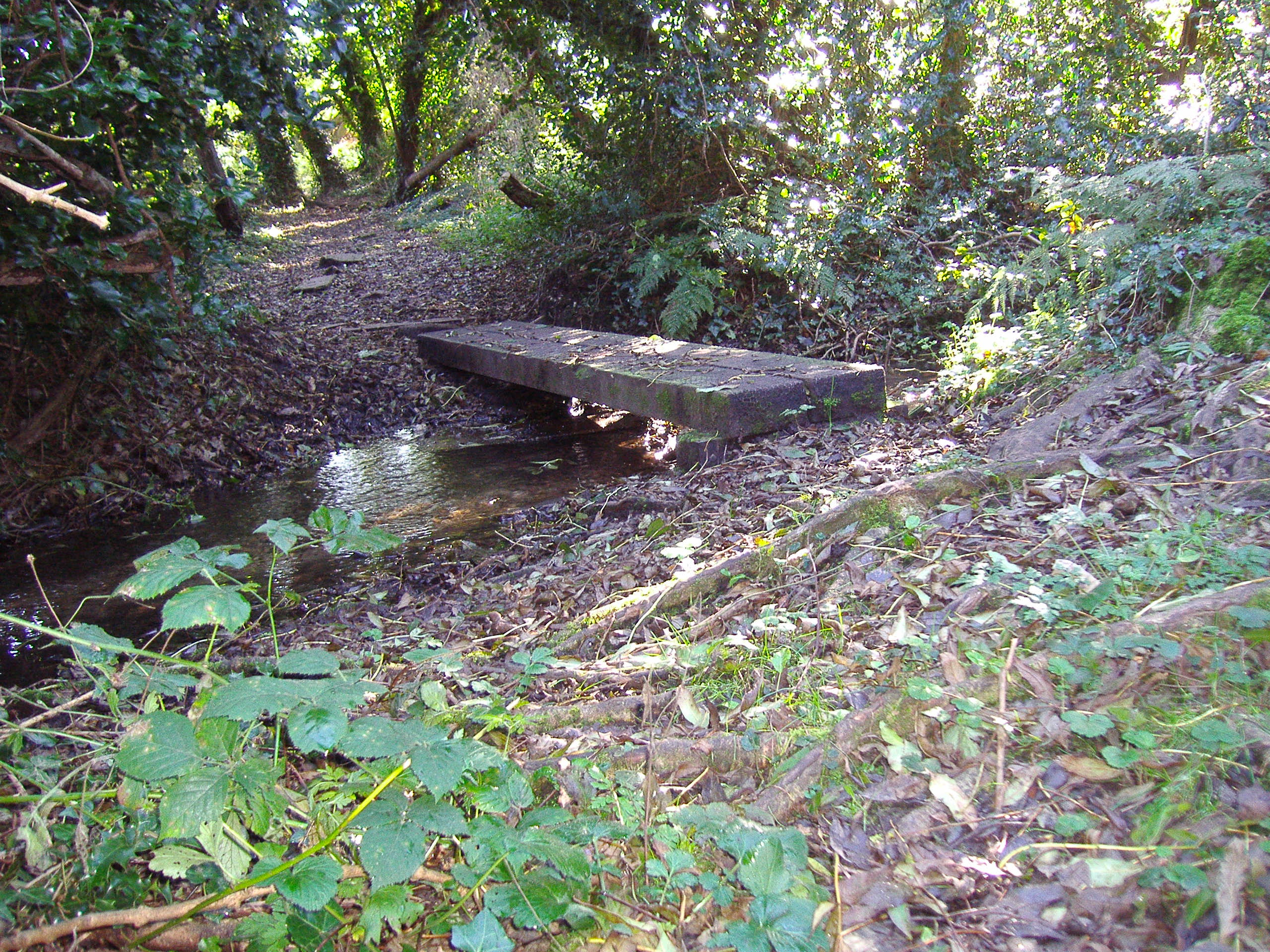
Beeston Beck in Sheringham Woods close to its source

Beeston Beck is a minor watercourse in the north of the county of Norfolk, England.

== Sources ==
This small short beck rises from series of springs that feed into it at the northern end of Sheringham Wood. These springs are at the base of a valley below Pretty Corner and from this point the land becomes low lying. In the valley is Beeston Regis Common and the smaller Sheringham Common. These commons, being spring-fed wetlands, are classed as Lowland Valley Fens and are part of the North Norfolk Special Area of Conservation (SAC), they are also Sites of Special Scientific Interest (SSSI) in their own right. The important plant communities that exist have chalk and acid-loving plants growing within centimetres of each other. The beck runs across the common southwards. Until 1901 the Beck marked the border between the parishes of Sheringham on the west bank and Beeston Regis on the East bank, but now the whole of Beeston Common and Back Common lie within the parish boundary of Sheringham. The beck then runs along the western edge of the common alongside Brook Road and at the end crosses under the A149 coast road. The beck now runs through the south eastern suburb of Sheringham known locally as the Back Common. The beck flows alongside Curtis Lane and under the Bittern Line, Sheringham to Cromer railway line. Just on the otherside of the railway bridge it is joined by a tributary from the east, which runs from the direction of Church Lane and Beeston Regis Priory. The Beck now turns westwards and cuts across the bottom edge of allotments and then turns eastward around the back of Beeston Road. At this point Beeston Beck once was the supply for a watermill.

== Sheringham Watermill ==
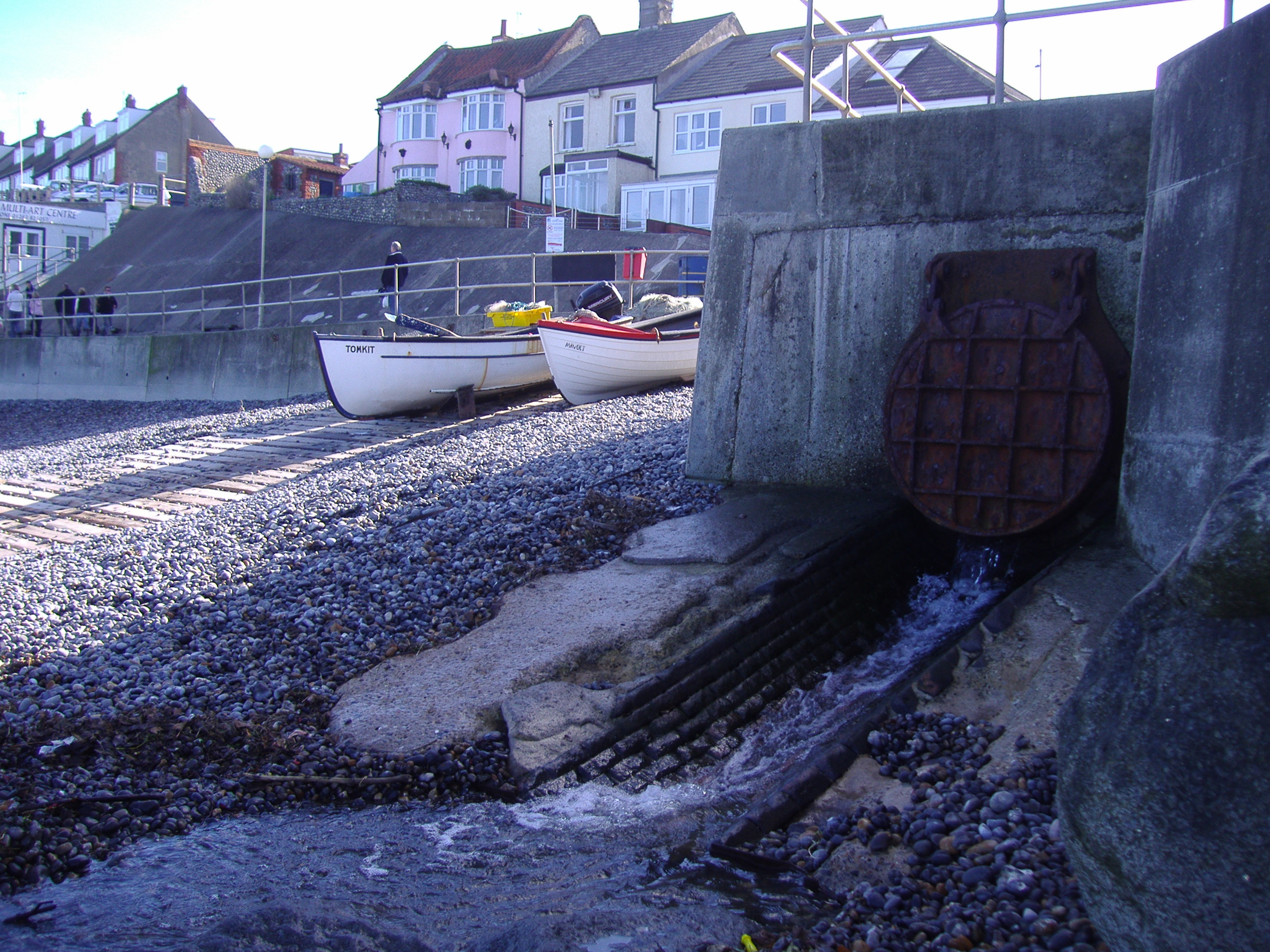
The outfall of Beeston Beck on Sheringham's east beach

Sheringham watermill began operating in c.1750 and was used in the processing of maize. By c.1865 the mill had been converted into a paper mill. The location of the Watermill was in Beeston Road which until 1901 had been called Paper Mill Road. The mill's power came from an overshot waterwheel. Beeston beck is only a small slow running beck and in order to power an overshot waterwheel there would have had to have been a good headwater. A Dam and a millpond would have provided this power but all traces of this engineering works have disappeared over the passing of time. It is believed that the mill pond may have been located on the site of what is now housing and local allotment gardens. A Blue plaque has been placed on the wall of a cottage in Beeston road at the location of the paper mill. The plaque was placed there by Sheringham & District Preservation Society. The beck now runs along the rear of these cottages before entering a culvert which runs under Beeston Road and Beach Road and appears at an outflow in the wall of the sea defences on the beach. From there on it runs across the beach and into the North Sea.

== The Sheringham Loke Group ==
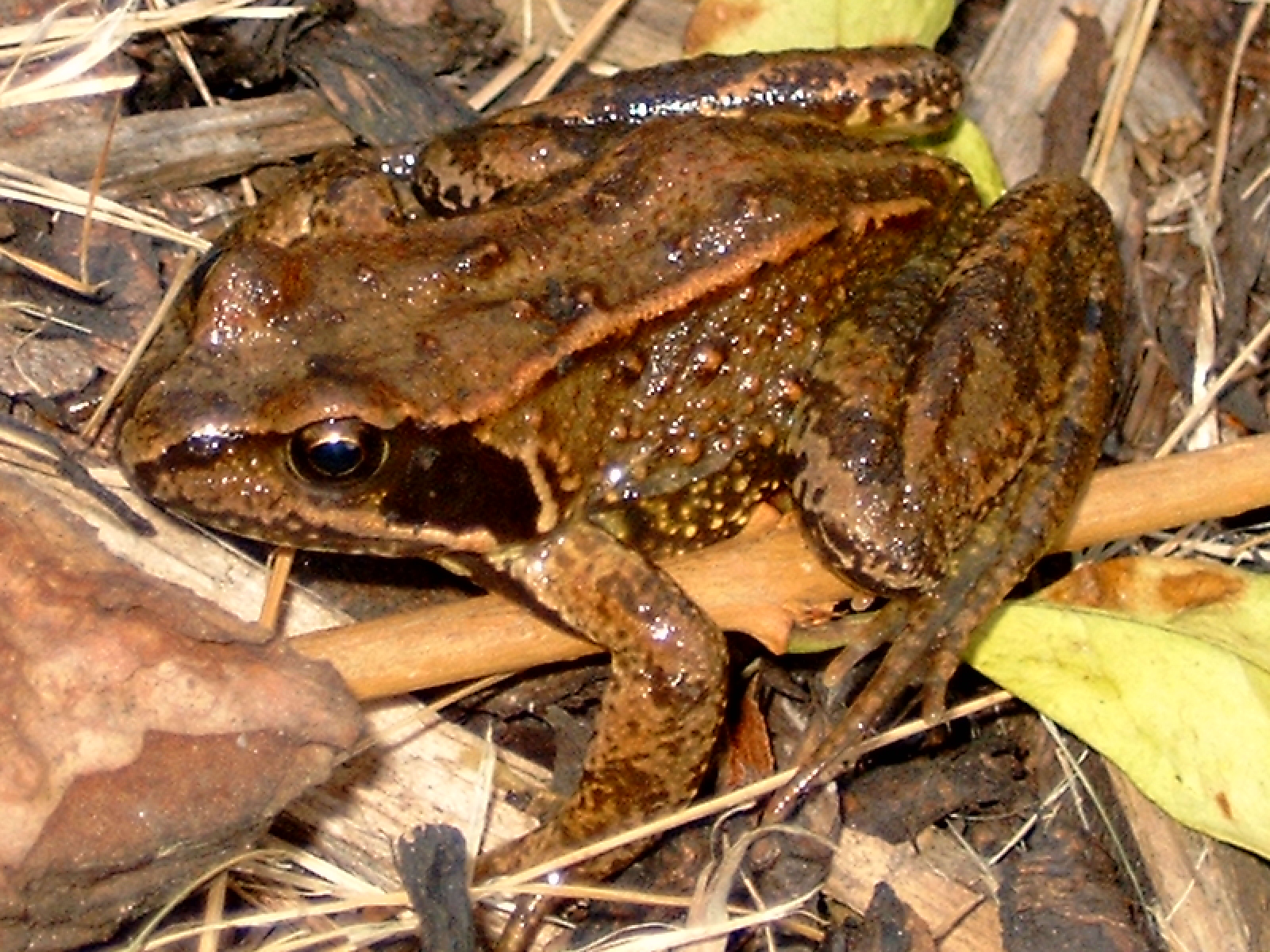
The Common Brown Frog

In June 2007 a group was formed in Sheringham for the care and preservation of Beeston Beck and its Tributary Sheringham Back Loke. The “Sheringham Loke Group”, as they call themselves, as their first project organized a Litter pick and stream safari. With Help from UK RiverCare and donations of equipment from Anglian Water the group managed to remove a variety of rubbish and flotsam which has accumulated over the years. Finds included a broken skateboard, mobile phone, a snapped fishing rod, a variety of smashed pottery, several boots and shoes, scaffold poles and a further 10 black bags of rubbish. After the cleanup operation, the group then undertook a survey of the wildlife in the watercourse. They were able to identify Freshwater shrimps (Gammarus), Mayfly larvae (Ephemeroptera), Caddisfly (Trichoptera) Larvae and Various species of worms and Leeches. They also discovered Stickleback fish (Gasterostreus aculeatus) and several species of frogs.

== Gallery ==
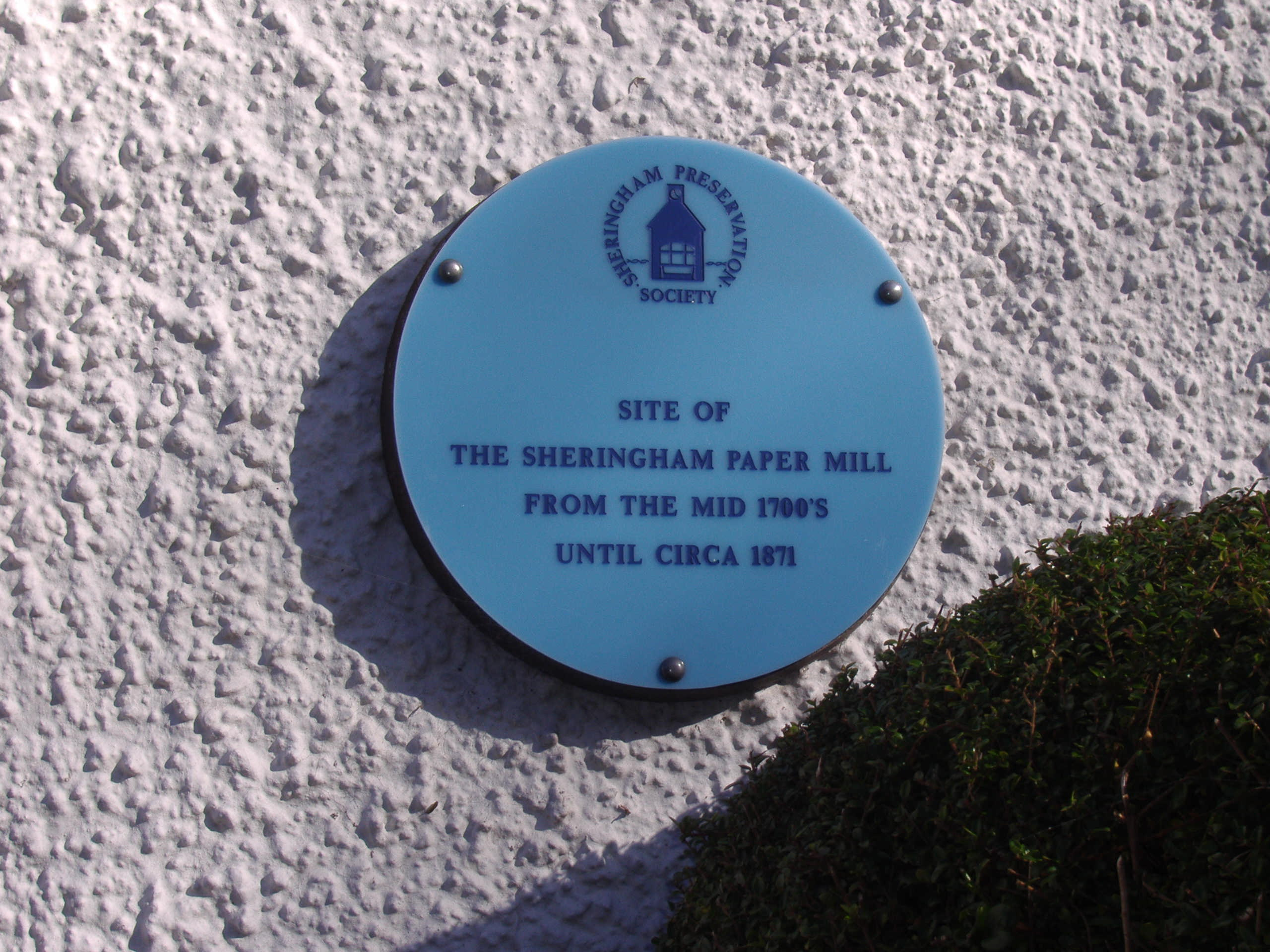
The Blue Plaque on the wall of a Cottage in Beeston Road, Sheringham, marks the location of Sheringham watermill (Paper).

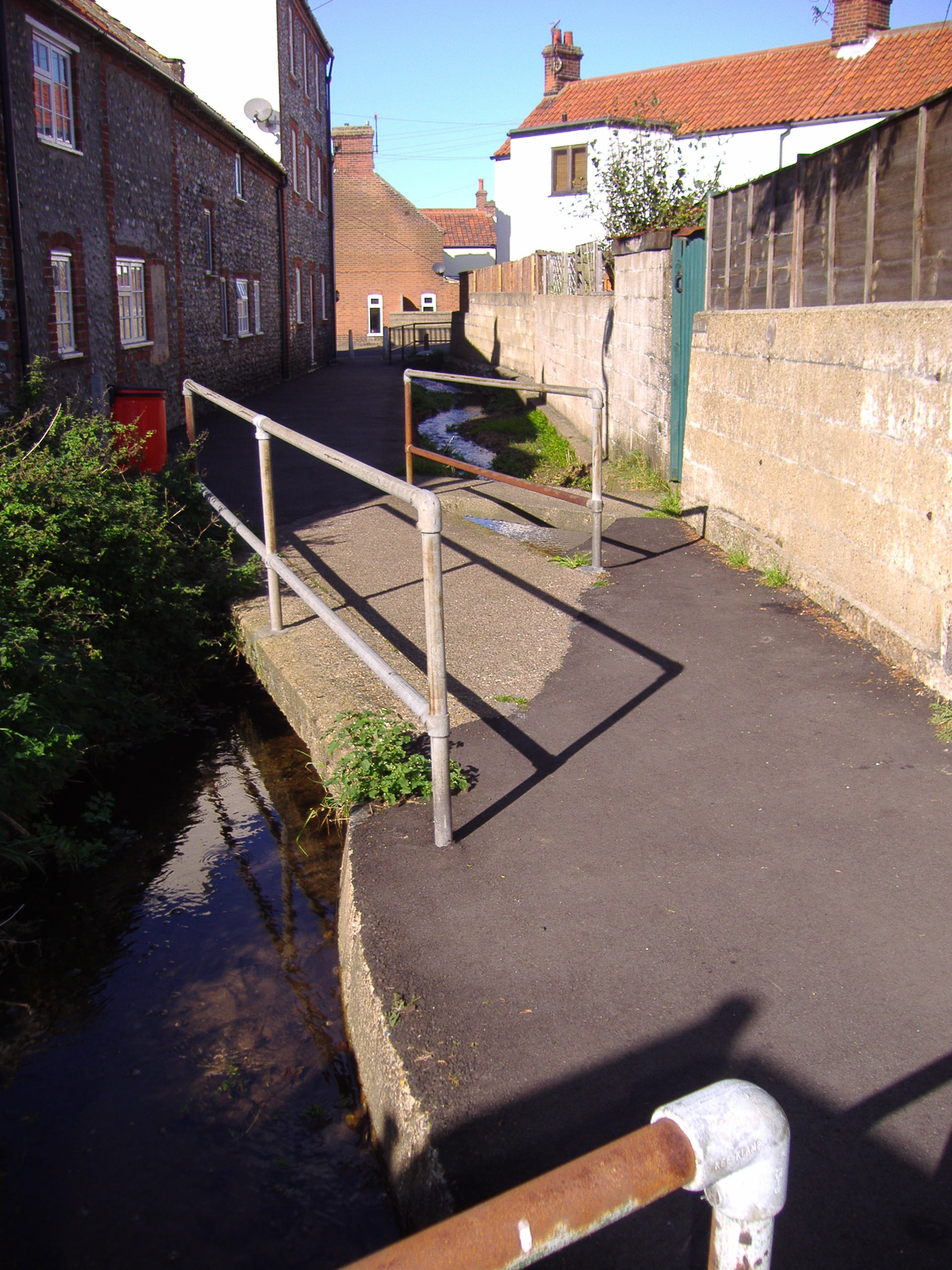
Beeston Beck's course at the Back of the Houses on Beeston Road.

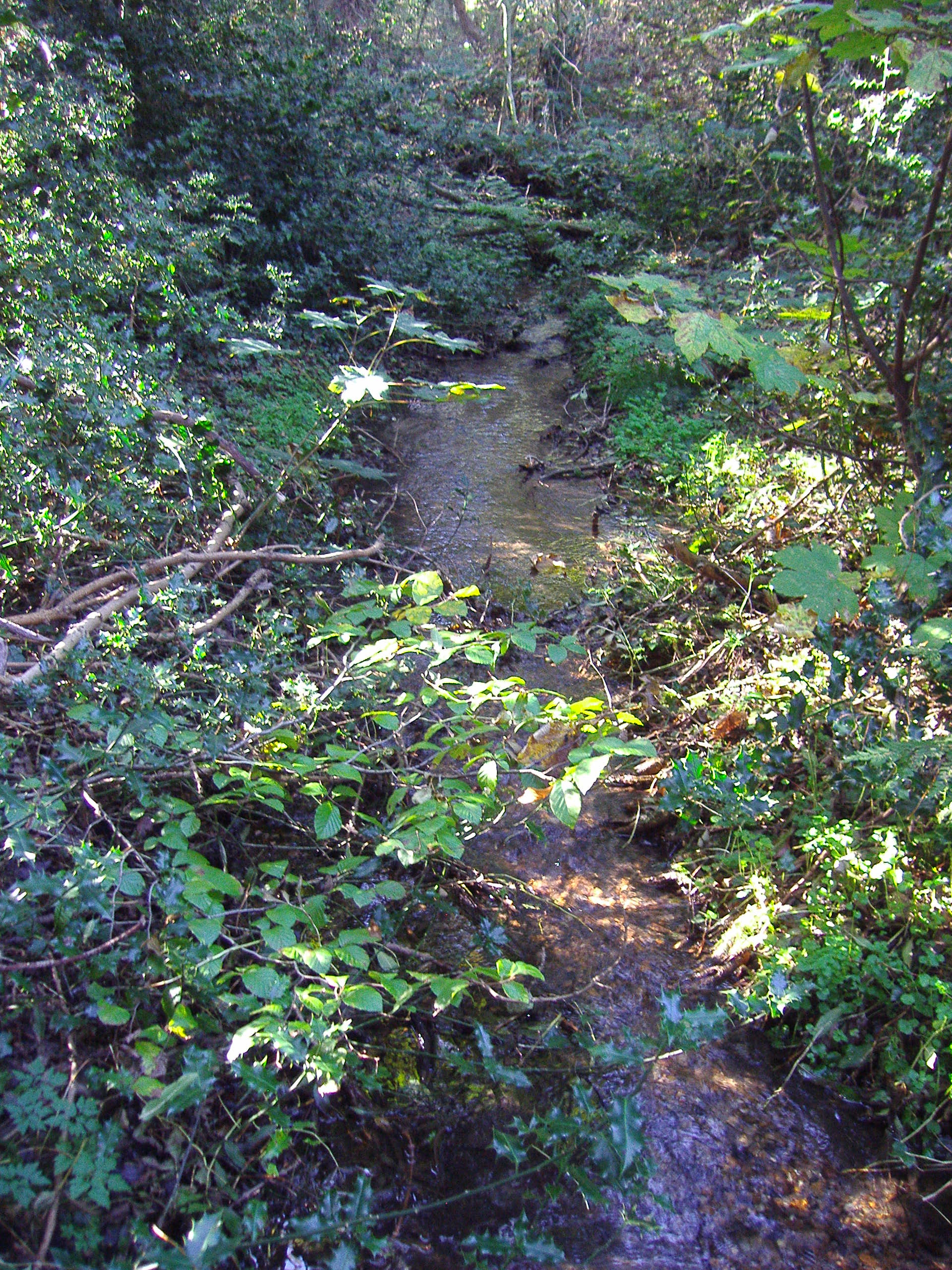
The Beck flowing through woodland on Beeston common.

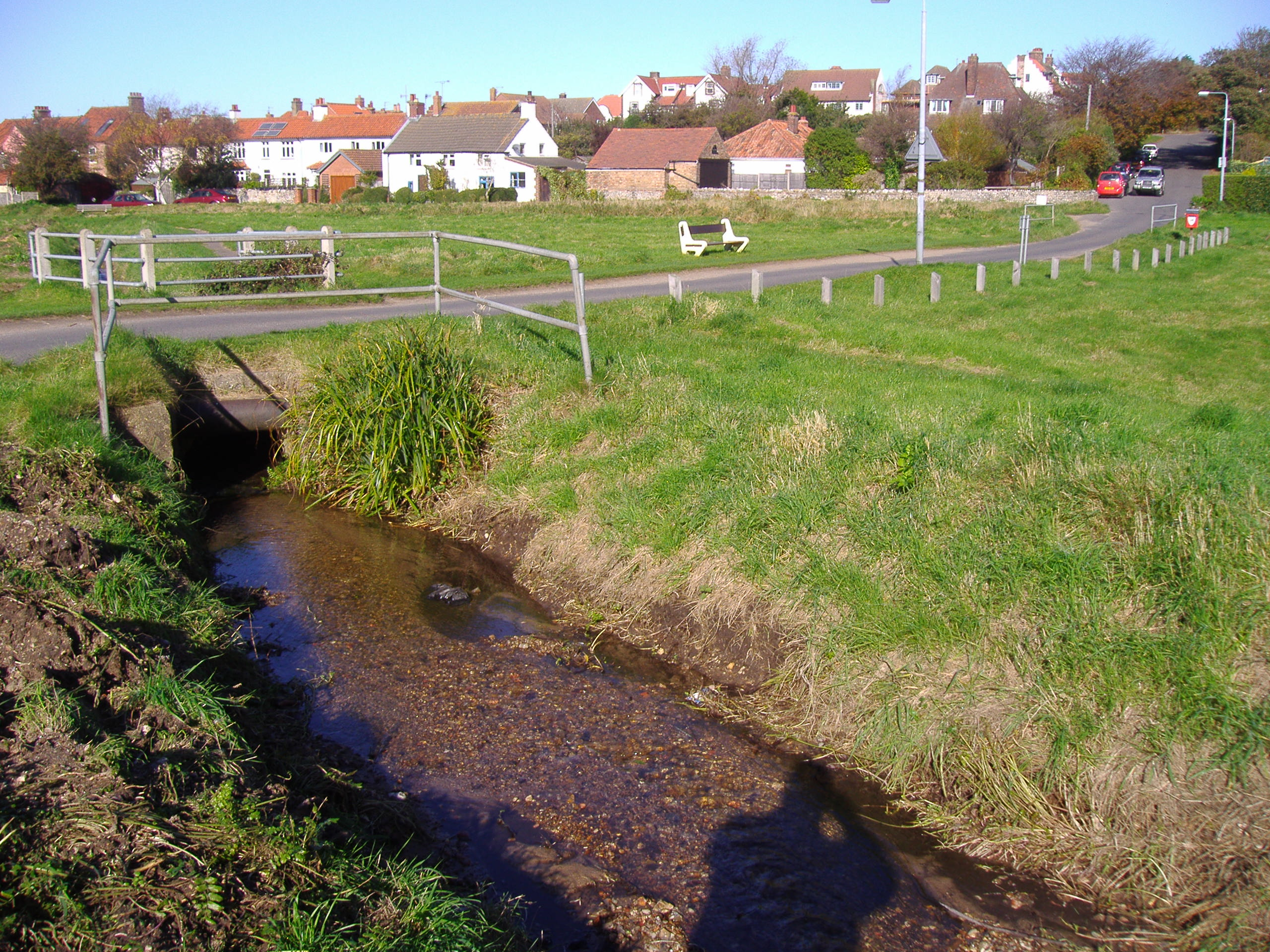
The Back common in Sheringham

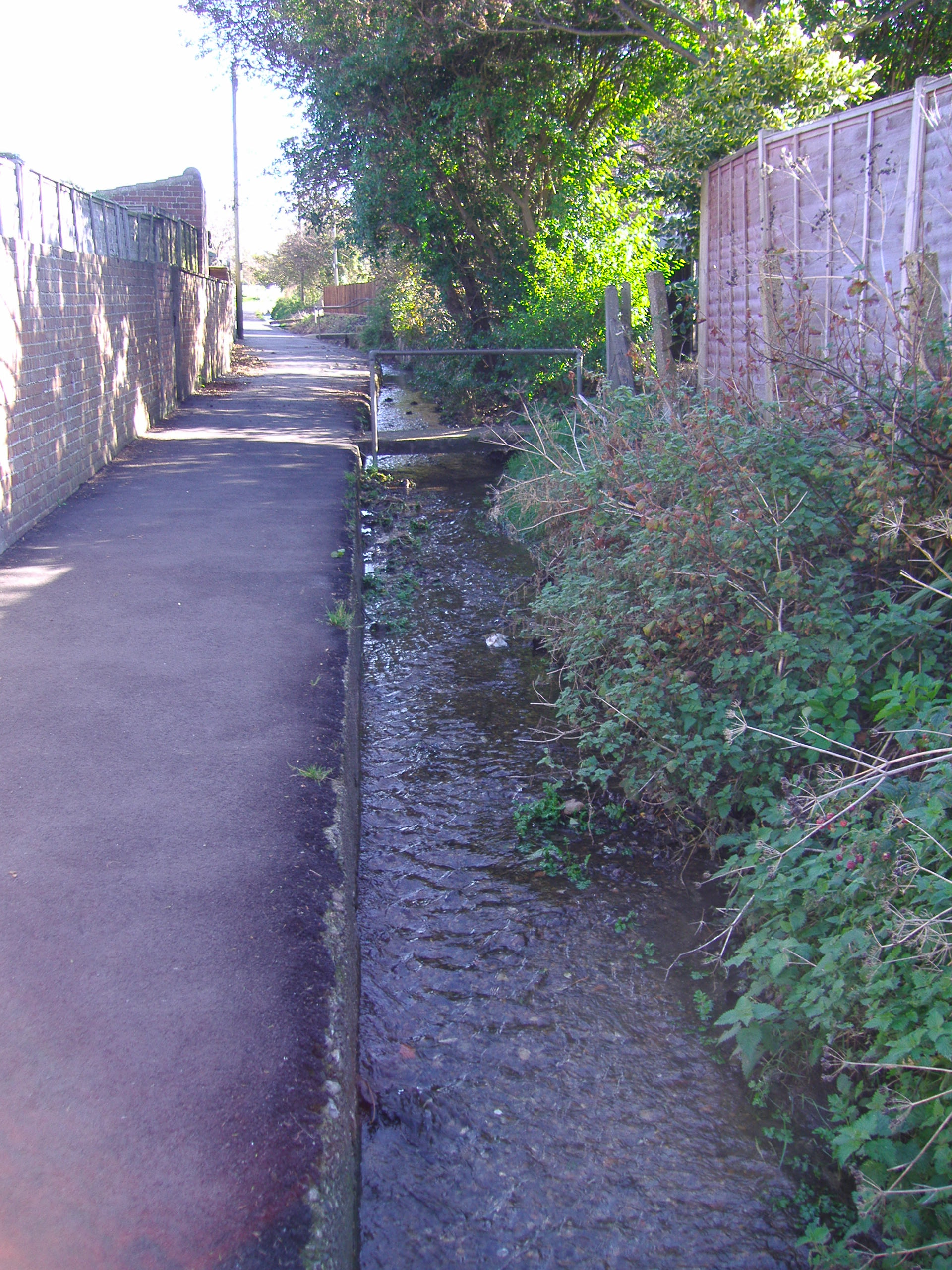
Until 1901 the Beck marked the border between the parishes of Beeston Regis and Sheringham.

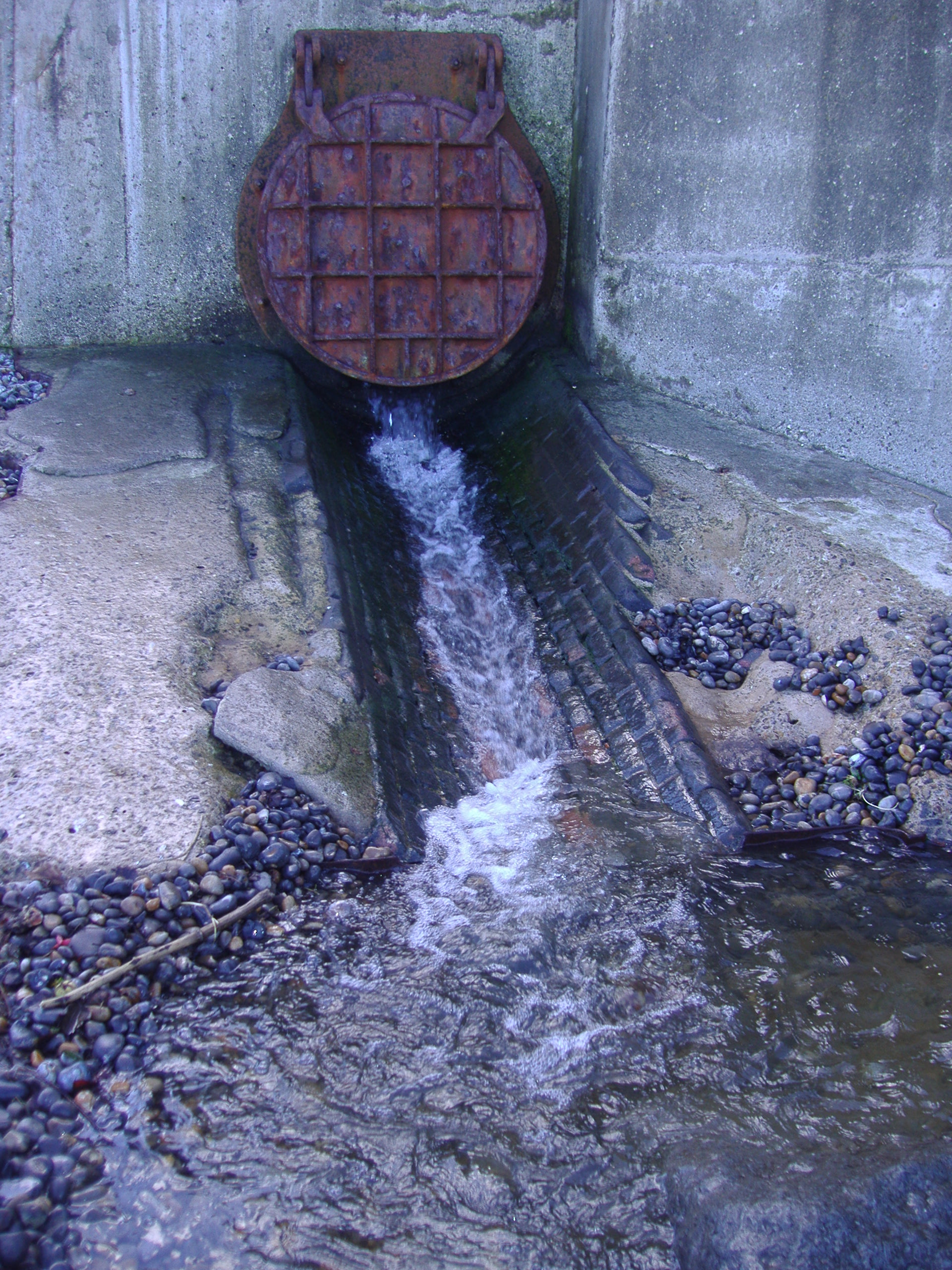
The Beck's outfall on to the east beach at Sheringham.
