= Can't Cook, Won't Cook =

British cooking game show

- Genre: Cooking game show
- Created by: Bazal Productions
- Presented by: Ainsley Harriott; Kevin Woodford; Lesley Waters; Richard Cawley; Tony Tobin
- Country of origin: United Kingdom
- Original language: English
- No. of series: 7
- No. of episodes: 688

Production
- Production location: Pebble Mill Studios
- Running time: 25 minutes
- Production companies: Bazal Midlands and BBC Pebble Mill

Original release
- Network: BBC1
- Release: 20 November 1995 – 7 July 2000

Can't Cook, Won't Cook is a British cooking game show that aired on BBC1 from 20 November 1995 to 7 July 2000.

== Format ==
Two people, one of whom can't cook and one of whom won't cook, were nominated to appear on the show and under the instruction of a celebrity/world class chef prepare and cook a meal. When the dish was cooked, the nominator would be blindfolded and asked to taste the food. Following this, they would decide whose dish was best. In the event of a tie, the aforementioned chef would decide.

Then once the winner has been decided the walls of the studio open up to reveal a prize (usually a food blender or set of saucepans).

== Transmissions ==
Series	Start date	End date	Episodes
1	20 November 1995	22 December 1995	25
2	2 January 1996	27 March 1996	64
2	29 March 1996		64
2	23 April 1996		64
3	28 March 1996		166
3	1 April 1996	22 April 1996	166
3	24 April 1996	27 March 1997	166
3	7 April 1997		166
4	1 April 1997	4 April 1997	42
4	8 April 1997	4 June 1997	42
5	2 September 1997	15 July 1998	198
6	24 August 1998	23 April 1999	149
6	29 June 1999	7 July 1999	149
7	1 June 1999	4 June 1999	44
7	26 July 1999	7 July 2000	44
