= Richard Cawley =

English food writer and fashion designer

- Born: May 28, 1947 (age 79); Doncaster
- Occupations: Food writer, fashion designer

Richard Cawley (born 28 May 1947) is an English food writer, chef and fashion designer.

== Biography ==
Cawley was born in Doncaster. He attended the local art school before gaining a place at the Ecole de la Chambre Syndicale de la Couture Parisienne, a fashion school in Paris founded by the great couturiers to carry on their most treasured traditions. During his time in Paris, he also studied life drawing at the École des Beaux-Arts. After this introduction into the world of fashion, he moved on to London and after two more years of college was accepted into the Fashion School of the Royal College of Art.

Graduating with a master's degree with Distinction, Cawley was invited to work at the fashion house of Bellville Sassoon, designing couture and ready-to-wear collections, and clothes for many famous and royal ladies, especially Diana, Princess of Wales, for whom they designed many outfits including her engagement sailor suit and her going away outfit.

After the Royal wedding, Cawley began to look around for new heights to scale. He decided to leave Bellville Sassoon, and when in 1984 he won the Mouton Cadet cookery competition in The Observer newspaper, he overnight exchanged a career in fashion for one in food.

Cawley has published several cookery books: The New English Cookery, Octopus Books 1986, Not Quite Vegetarian, Orbis 1986, The Artful Cook, Macdonald Orbis 1988, which he also illustrated with his own drawings and paintings and That's Entertaining a Headline Book for Channel 4 1990. In 1993 he published Easy Oriental (originally for Marks and Spencer), Outdoor Eating, and Green Feasts, a book of vegetarian menus for 'everyone' all published by Conran Octopus. He was also one of six 'star' contributors to the new Sunday Times Cook's Companion (Ebury Press), his being the section on American cuisine, and The Creative Cook (Conran Octopus 1995) plus the best selling Ready Steady Cook 2 and Fast Fab Food (Headline 1998).

He has written countless food, cookery and travel articles for many magazines and was for two years the food editor of Options. For several years he wrote regularly for YOU, a section of The Mail on Sunday.

Cawley has travelled extensively, particularly in the Far East. In 1987, with three other artists, he spent three months travelling around China, culminating in a major exhibition at the Royal Festival Hall and A China Scrapbook, a 30-minute television programme for the BBC.

== Television ==
He has worked extensively in television, beginning in 1990, as a writer presenter, making six 30-minute programmes entitled That's Entertaining for Channel 4, and a 30-minute programme called Guess Who's Coming to Dinner for Channel 4 in 1991. He has appeared occasionally on Granada's This Morning, Six o'Clock Live and on Children's Saturday television Parallel Nine. He has appeared on the Travel Show, The Big Breakfast and cable television and had a weekly spot for six months on GMTV’s Top of the Morning. He has made a guest appearance, singing and dancing with Rustie Lee on a SKY telethon, has appeared as a guest in Delia Smith’s series The Winter Collection. He has also made a film for BBC Food and Drink in his own kitchen, and his home was the subject of Through the Keyhole.

Cawley cooked frequently on Can't Cook, Won't Cook and Mixing It and has appeared regularly on BBC's cult programmes Ready Steady Cook.

He regularly appears in pantomime and has published a novel, The Butterfly Boy.

== Vegetarianism ==
Cawley's 1986 book Not Quite Vegetarian is an early semi-vegetarian cookbook. He has also authored two vegetarian cookbooks. In 1993, Green Feasts: Memorable Meat-Free Menus and in 1996, Vegetarian Feasts.
