= Lesley Waters =

English celebrity chef

- Born: 3 April 1960 (age 66); London, England, United Kingdom
- Education: Ealing College
- Culinary career
- Cooking style: Molecular Gastronomy
- Television show(s): This Morning, Ready Steady Cook
- Website: http://www.lesleywaters.com/

Lesley Waters (born 3 April 1960) is an English celebrity chef. She regularly appeared on such cookery programmes as Ready Steady Cook, and is currently one of the featured chefs on This Morning.

== Career ==
Waters studied French Cuisine at Ealing College for three years, before cooking in top hotels, and winning awards including a scholarship to the Hotel Intercontinental in Düsseldorf. She then joined Prue Leith's restaurant, where she was promoted to senior chef. She then worked as a freelance corporate chef and caterer for government officials before joining Leith's School of Food and Wine as an instructor, rising to head teacher.

Waters started in television in 1989 on various cable TV shows, before Ready Steady Cook and Can't Cook, Won't Cook.

== Personal life ==
Waters is married to Tim, a photographer, and the couple have two children. They live in a manor house near Halstock, Dorset. The house is now the base for Waters' cookery school.

A panel of dietary experts recently publicly praised Waters for the use of ‘good fats’ in her recipes.
