= R. W. Ketton-Cremer =

English historian

R. W. Ketton-Cremer JP FSA FRSL FBA
- Born: Robert Wyndham Ketton-Cremer; 2 May 1906; Plympton, Devon, England
- Died: 12 December 1969 (aged 63)
- Education: Harrow School
- Alma mater: Balliol College, Oxford

Robert Wyndham Ketton-Cremer, JP, FSA, FRSL, FBA (2 May 1906 – 12 December 1969) was an English landowner, biographer and historian. He bequeathed his family seat, Felbrigg Hall, to the National Trust.

== Early life ==
Robert Wyndham Cremer was born in Plympton, Devon, on 2 May 1906 to Wyndham Cremer Ketton-Cremer and his wife Emily Bayly. He was educated at Harrow School. He and his brother assumed the surname Ketton-Cremer in 1924. He won an exhibition to Balliol College, Oxford where he read English Literature. While at Oxford he published poetry.

== Life at Felbrigg ==
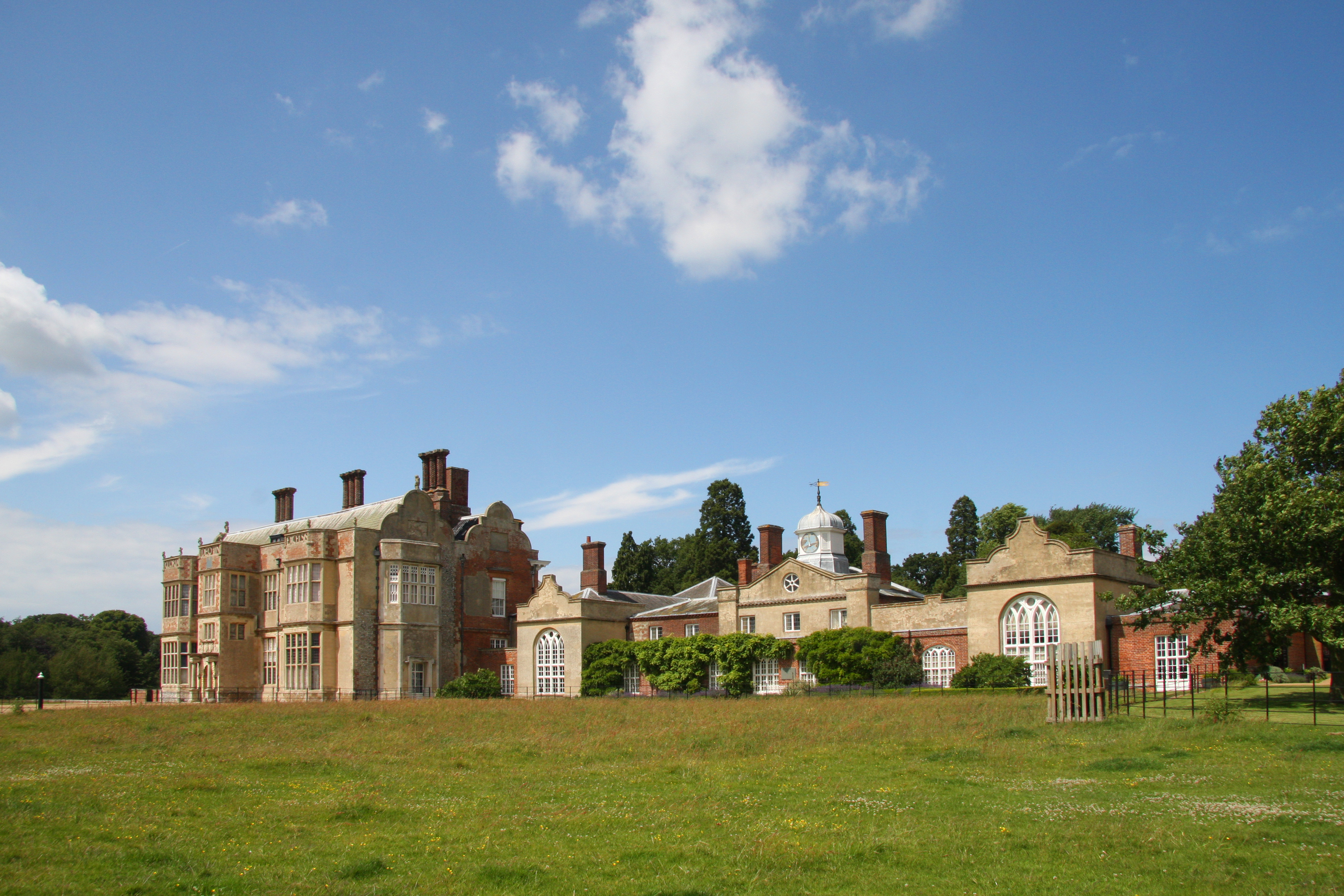
Felbrigg Hall

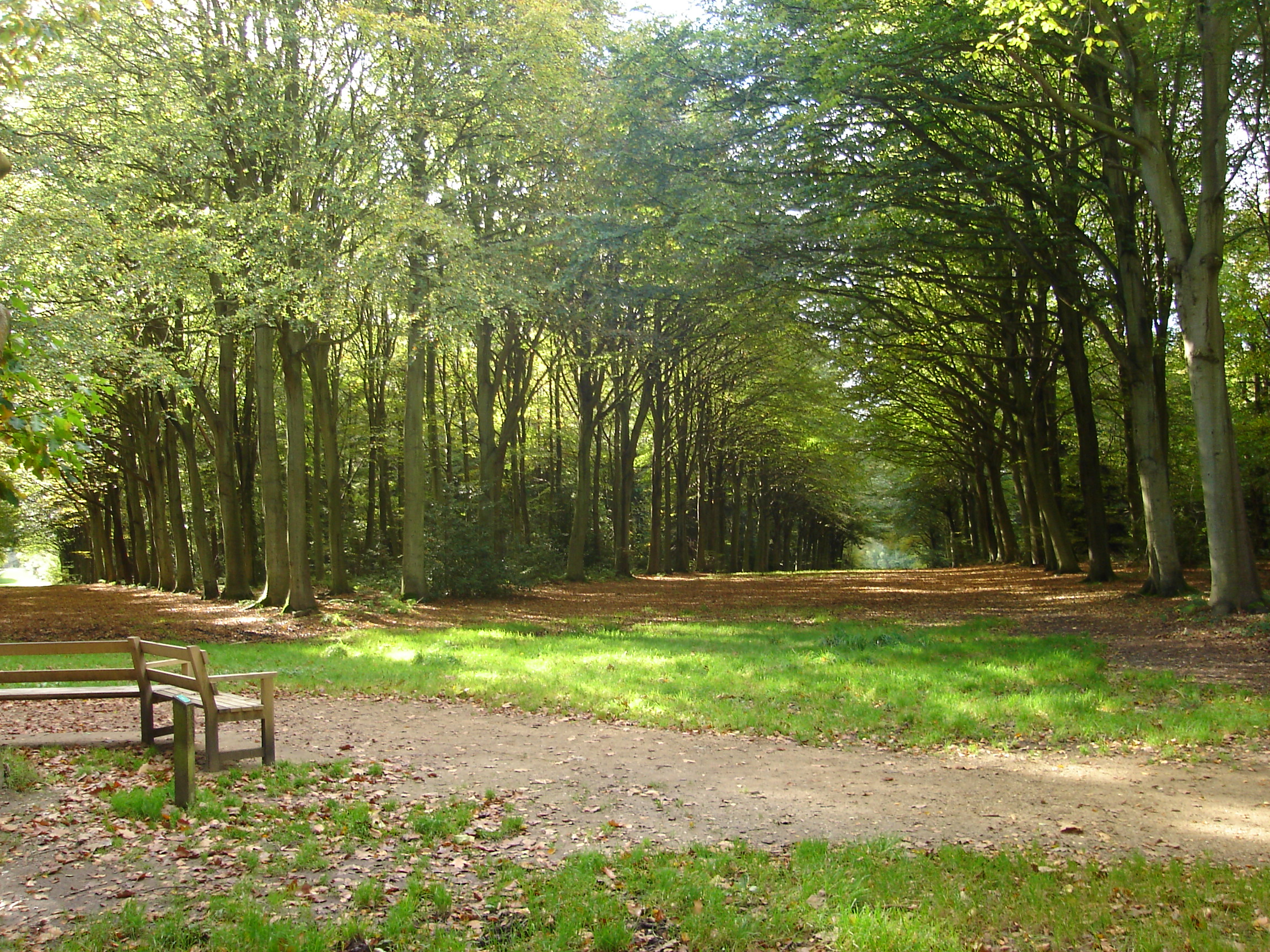
The Victory V Plantation at Felbrigg Hall, planted by Ketton-Cremer to mark V.E. Day and the death of his brother in Crete.

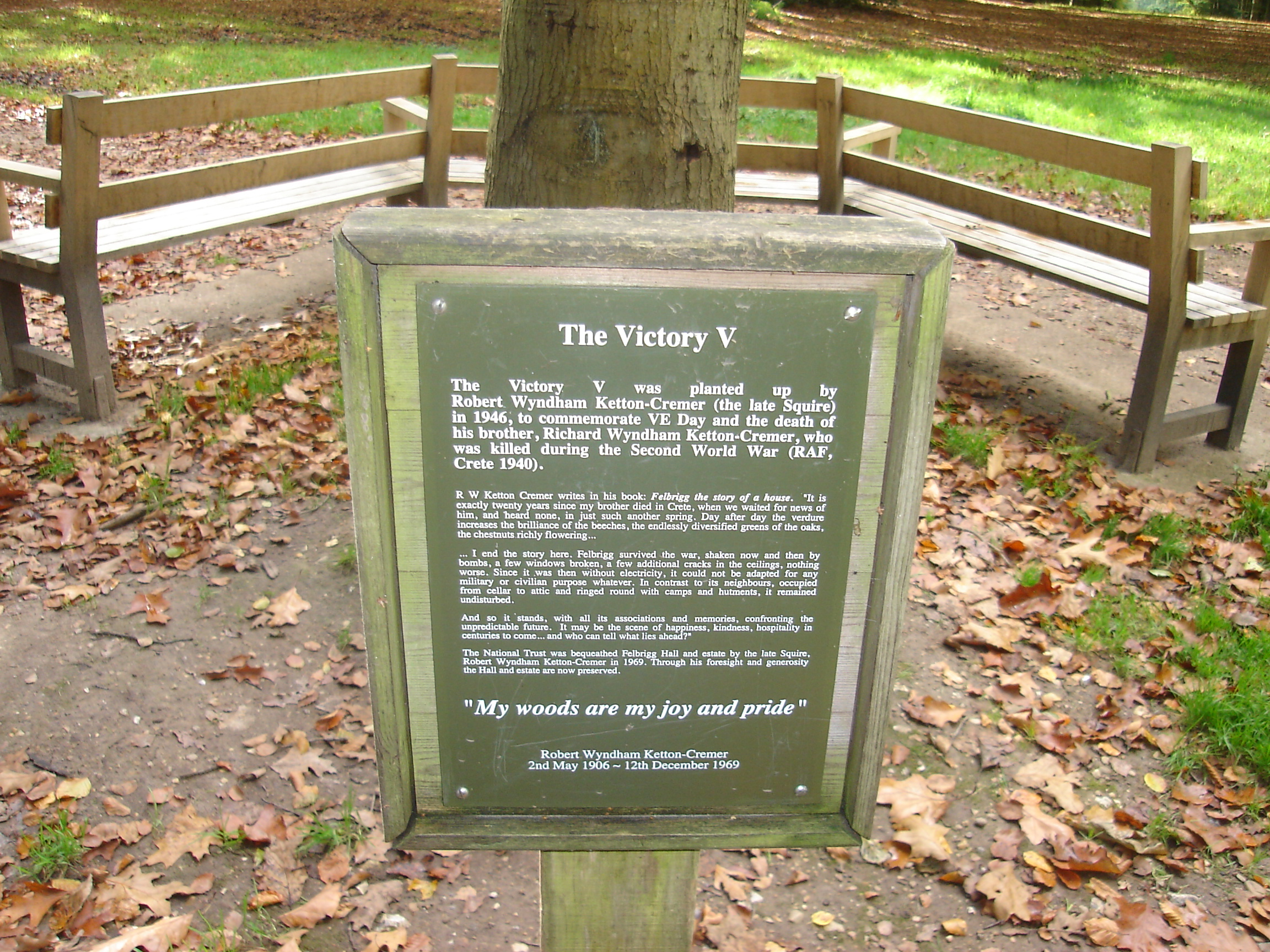
The Victory V plaque

He was a descendant of the Wyndham family, who owned the Felbrigg estate in Norfolk, and was known as "the Last Squire". He inherited the estate on the death of his father in 1933. Wyndham Ketton-Cremer's heir, his younger brother Richard, died in Crete during the Second World War. Ketton-Cremer also owned the Beeston Regis estate, including what is now Beeston Hall School.

Ketton-Cremer never married. He was a closet homosexual, at a time when homosexual acts were still criminalised though close friends were aware of his sexuality. With regard to intimate relationships, the novelist and critic Anthony Powell, who dedicated his novel The Kindly Ones to Ketton-Cremer (who read proofs of Powell's books and suggested improvements, up to the time of his death) wrote in 1988, questioning the appropriateness of Ketton-Cremer's name being included in a "list of homosexual undergraduates" in Bevis Hillier's Young Betjeman, "I knew Ketton-Cremer... and never heard a suggestion that he had physical relations with another human being, then [at Oxford] or throughout his life." He stood godfather to the children of his friends, including Tristram Powell, son of Anthony Powell.

== Public appointments ==
He was a justice of the peace and as such was required to witness two hangings. He was a major in the East Norfolk Home Guard during the Second World War. He served as High Sheriff of Norfolk in 1951–52 and was a trustee of National Portrait Gallery.

== Writing ==
Ketton-Cremer wrote widely on the history of his native Norfolk as well as number of biographies, including one of Whig statesman William Windham, one of politician Horace Walpole, and one of the poet Thomas Gray, for which he won the James Tait Black Award. An annotated bibliography was published in 1995. His works include:

- The Early Life and Diaries of William Windham. Faber and Faber, London, 1930.
- Horace Walpole: A Biography. Faber and Faber, London, 1940; revised edition 1946.
- Oliver Le Neve and his duel with Sir Henry Hobart, National Trust Collections, Felbrigg Hall, 1941
- Norfolk Portraits, 1944
- A Norfolk Gallery, 1948
- Country Neighbourhood. Faber and Faber, London, 1951.
- Thomas Gray, 1955
- Norfolk Assembly, 1957
- Forty Norfolk Essays, 1961
- Felbrigg: The Story of a House, 1962
- Norfolk in the Civil War: A portrait of a society in conflict. Faber and Faber, London, 1969. ISBN 057109130X

== Honours ==
In 1968, Ketton-Cremer was elected a Fellow of the British Academy (FBA). He was also an elected Fellow of the Society of Antiquaries of London (FSA) and Fellow of the Royal Society of Literature (FRSL). He was awarded an honorary Doctor of Letters (LittD) by the University of East Anglia in 1969.

== Death and legacy ==
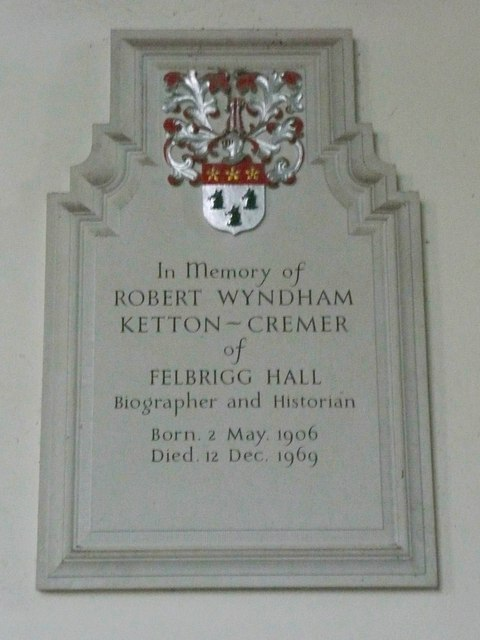
Memorial in St Margaret's Church, Felbrigg

Ketton-Cremer died on 12 December 1969. He bequeathed Felbrigg Hall to the National Trust.

A brief memoir was written shortly after his death by the literary scholar Mary Lascelles.

To mark the 50th anniversary of the decriminalisation of sexual activity between men in England and Wales, in summer 2017 the National Trust organised a national "Prejudice and Pride" campaign highlighting the LGBT themes in its properties. At Felbrigg Hall that included displaying a short film – narrated by Stephen Fry – in which it was revealed that Robert Wyndham Ketton-Cremer was gay, a fact previously known only to his close friends. Three of Ketton-Cremer's godchildren criticised the decision, claiming that a public outing would have been against Ketton-Cremer's wishes and accusing the Trust of using their godfather's private life to generate publicity. Fry defended the Trust's decision, justifying it by stating that in his view Ketton-Cremer had only kept his sexuality a secret because of pervasive homophobia and fear of prosecution during his lifetime. Catherine Bennett, in The Guardian, considered it "unfortunate" that the Trust attached the "ambiguous" Ketton-Cremer, who "had neither, his family says, come out nor moved... in circles where homosexuality was unconcealed" to the Prejudice and Pride campaign, as opposed to a figure such as the openly gay James Lees-Milne, "who more or less assembled the Trust's collection of historic houses"; the "dire" short film featuring "someone silently [impersonating] Ketton-Cremer" was considered "undeniably ambitious in imagining how [Ketton-Cremer] must have felt about his sexuality" in light of the fact that "unhelpfully, the squire appears to have left no records." Fry's stance – that objection to the dubiously-accurate "outing" of Ketton-Cremer must be attributed to homophobia – was also criticised as lacking nuance.
