= Beeston Regis =

Village in Norfolk, England

Coordinates: 52.933°N 1.220°E

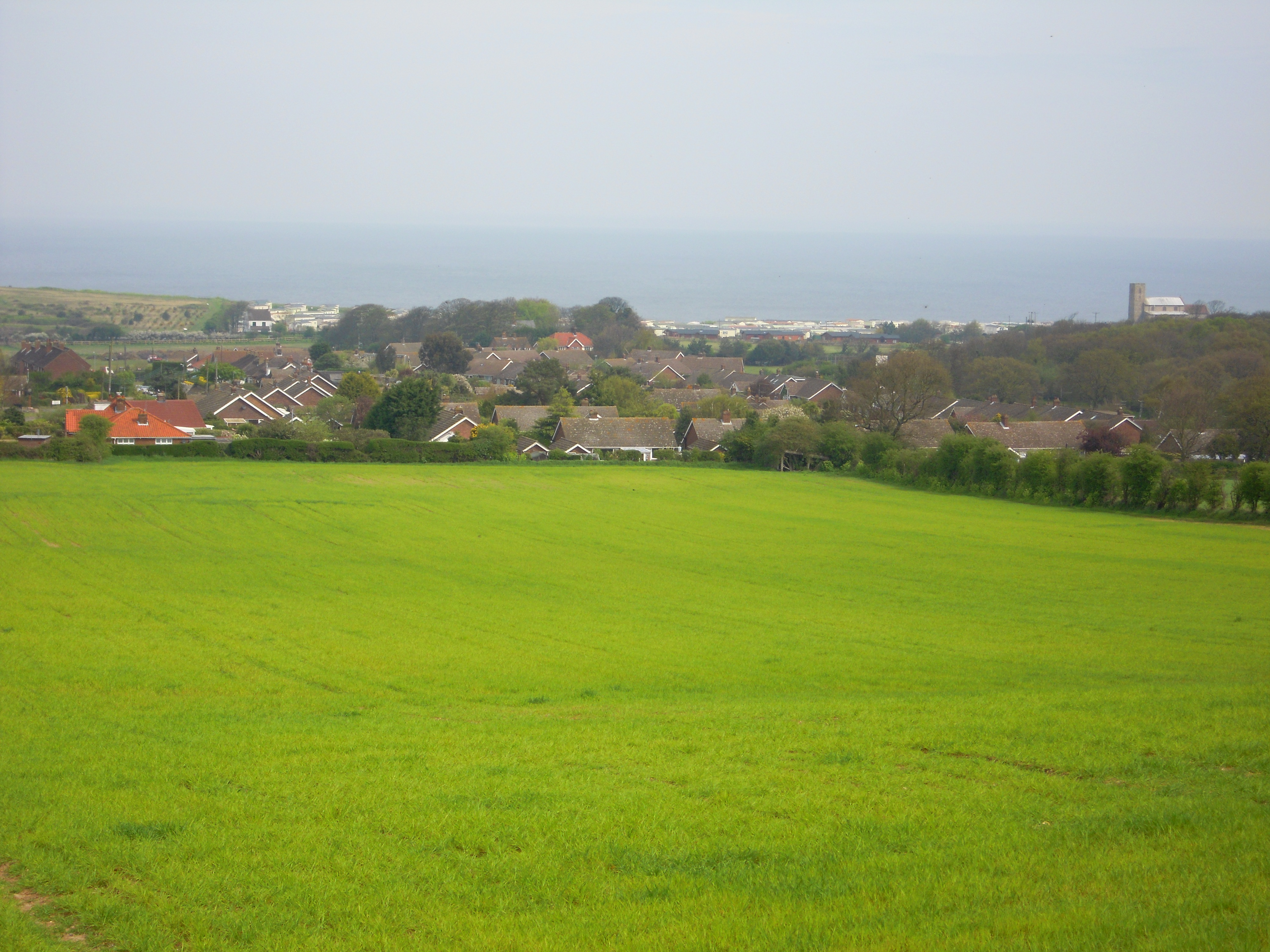
- Beeston Regis

- Location within Norfolk
- Area: 2.89 km^{2} (1.12 sq mi)
- Population: 1,062 (2011)
  - Density: 389.6/km^{2}
- OS grid reference: TG1642
  - London: 140 miles (230 km)
- Civil parish: Beeston Regis
- District: North Norfolk
- Shire county: Norfolk
- Region: East
- Country: England
- Sovereign state: United Kingdom
- Post town: SHERINGHAM
- Postcode district: NR26
- Dialling code: 01263
- Police: Norfolk
- Fire: Norfolk
- Ambulance: East of England
- UK Parliament: North Norfolk
- Website: http://www.beestonregis.org/

Beeston Regis is a village and civil parish in the North Norfolk district of Norfolk, England. It is about 1 mile (1.6 km) east of Sheringham near the North Sea coast. The village is 2 miles (3.2 km) west of Cromer and 16 miles (26 km) north of the city of Norwich. According to the 2011 census, it had a population of 1,062.

The parish of Runton forms the western boundary, the wooded Beeston Regis Heath forms the southern boundary with the parish of Aylmerton, and Sheringham lies to the west.

== History ==
There are few traces of early antiquity in Beeston Regis, with some evidence of Roman habitation on Beeston Regis Heath. In 1859 a complete set of quern-stones were found dating from Roman times.

On Beeston Regis Heath there are circular pits called 'Hills and Holes' (from the first edition of the Ordnance Survey map of the area). They are thought to date from prehistoric times. During the Saxon-Norman to Medieval periods these pits were dug to obtain iron ore, which was then smelted in a furnace to produce iron.

Beeston Regis is mentioned in Domesday Book of 1086, where it is called Besetune and Besetuna/tune. The main landholders of the parish were William d'Ecouis and Hugh de Montfort. The main tenant was Ingulf, The survey also lists ½ a mill. In the Domesday survey fractions were used to indicate that the entry, in this case a mill, was on an estate that lay within more than one parish.

Beeston Regis was once known as Beeston-next-the-Sea, but from 1399 when Henry Bolingbroke, Earl of Lancaster, became King Henry IV, the name became Beeston Regis. Regis means "of the king", and the living and manor of Beeston became part of the Crown and the Lancaster Inheritance.

Population from 1801 to 2011
Beeston Regis
Census year	Beeston Regis Civil Parish	Ecclesiastical Parish
1801	167	Same
1821	238	Same
1831	246	Same
1841	265	Same
1851	236	Same
1861	196	Same
1871	206	Same
1881	193	Same
1891	183	Same
1901	338	Same
1901 after adjustment	69	Same
1911	85	Same
1921	120	1,293
1931	178	974
1931 after adjustment	151	Same
1951	353	1,281
1951 after adjustment	401	1,281
1961	472	1,365
1971	827	Unknown
1981	842	Unknown
1991	1,087	Unknown
2001	1,091	Unknown
2011	1,062	Unknown

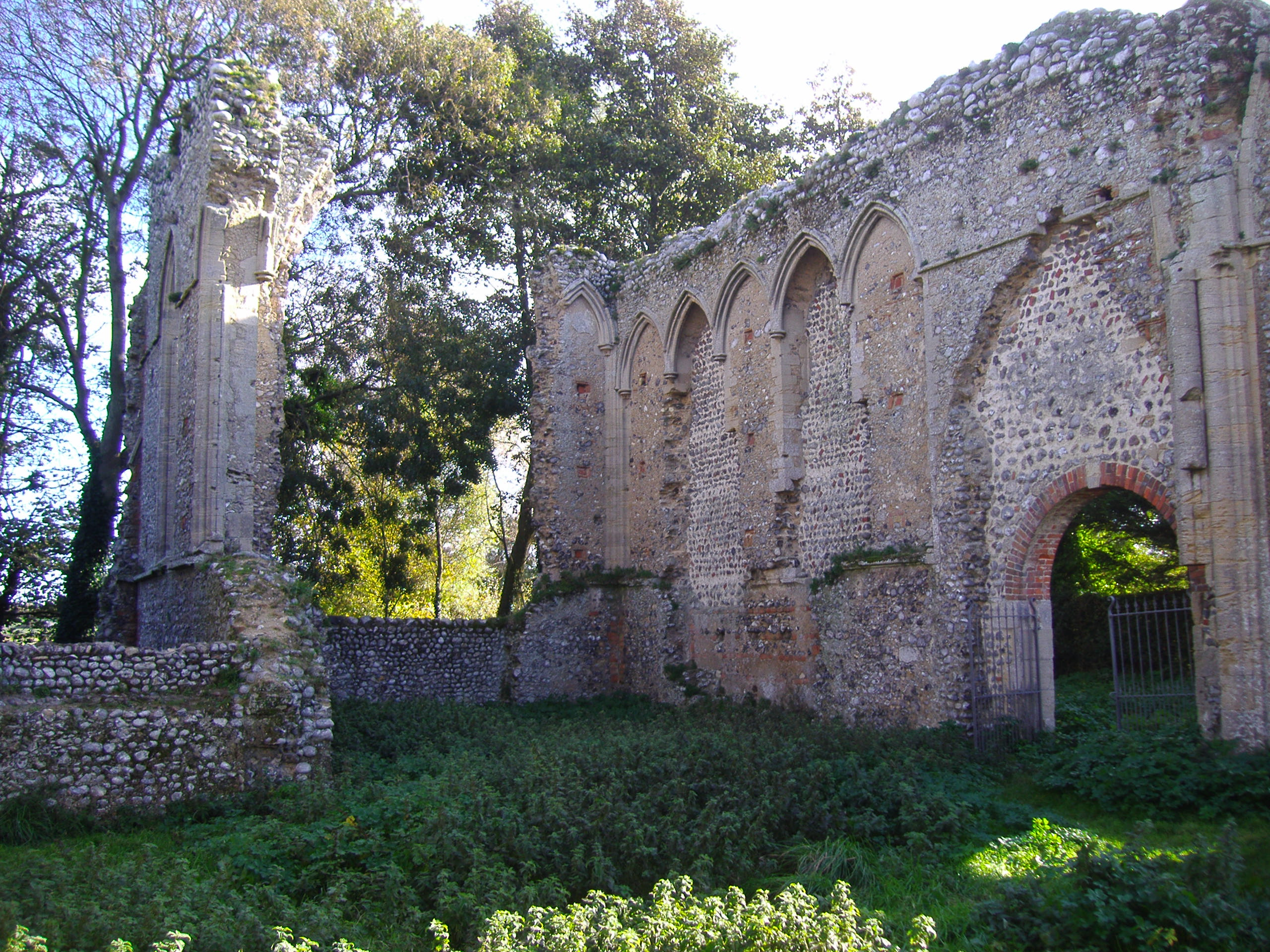
The ruins of St Mary's Priory, Beeston Regis

== St Mary's Priory ==
Beeston Regis Priory is remains of an Augustinian priory. It was founded in 1216, by Lady Isabel de Cressey. The priory is listed as Grade I and is located on the eastern side of Beeston Regis common.

The suppression of the Priory and its school (the priory was finally dissolved in 1538) left no local provision for education. This is believed to have led Sir John Gresham to found Gresham's School at nearby Holt in 1555.

The cloister, to the south of the nave of the priory church, is now part of the Priory Farm garden. To the east of the cloister, still standing, are part of the walls of the chapter house, and also some traces of the dormitory. The refectory and other domestic buildings probably are beneath or have been incorporated into the 18th century Priory Farmhouse, which was probably built from materials from the demolition of the early buildings. Much remains of the main priory church. The nave, from the west wall to the transept, is 75 feet (23 m) long and 23 feet (7.0 m) wide. The north wall still stands practically to the roof level, although the divisions between the windows have long gone. The belfry tower has gone, although the first steps can be seen in a doorway in the south wall. The south wall is only as high as the window-sill level. The west wall is standing almost intact to gable height, although the lining of the original door has been replaced by modern brickwork. The north transept is 24 feet (7.3 m) long and 24 feet (7.3 m) wide. The east wall of the transept is entirely gone, except for traces of its junction with the north wall. At the south end of this wall once stood a pillar; the opposite pillar, west of the south door, is almost complete and in a good state of preservation. Also in the transept there is a doorway which leads to what is thought to be a sacristy, and is the only doorway remaining in its original form. The architrave is almost complete. West of the transept there is a small chapel 23 feet (7.0 m) long and 12 feet (3.7 m) wide. Most of the chapel's window mouldings survive. The chancel at the eastern end of the ruin remains to roof height on the north and south side. The original eastern wall has been demolished, but a flint wall has been built up to window-sill level. The north-east corner still has most of its window mouldings.

Near the priory is the Priory maze, a popular tourist attraction that includes a café-restaurant and a garden centre.

== Beeston Regis Common ==
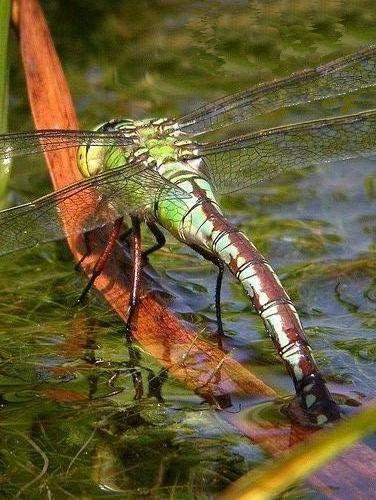
Emperor dragonfly on the pond at Beeston Common

Beeston Regis Common lies in the valley of Beeston Beck and consists of 24.7 hectares (61 acres) of grassland, heath, marsh, fen and secondary woodland. The common was made a Site of Special Scientific Interest/SA6 in 2000 and is a habitat for a wide range of mammals, birds, and insects. There are 40 species of rare flowering plants, and 14 species of British orchids have been recorded on the common due to its special soil conditions. With such a variety of flowers the site is attractive to butterflies; 26 species have been regularly recorded, including green hairstreak, brown argus and Essex skipper, as well as 19 species of dragonfly. Bird life of the common includes varieties such as chiffchaff, willow warbler, blackcap, common whitethroat, lesser whitethroat, reed warbler and occasionally sedge and grasshopper warblers. Nightjars are occasionally heard. Foxes and muntjac deer along with smaller mammals such as water shrew, field voles, and harvest mice are present. Adders, slowworms and common lizards can also be found on the common.

== All Saints church ==
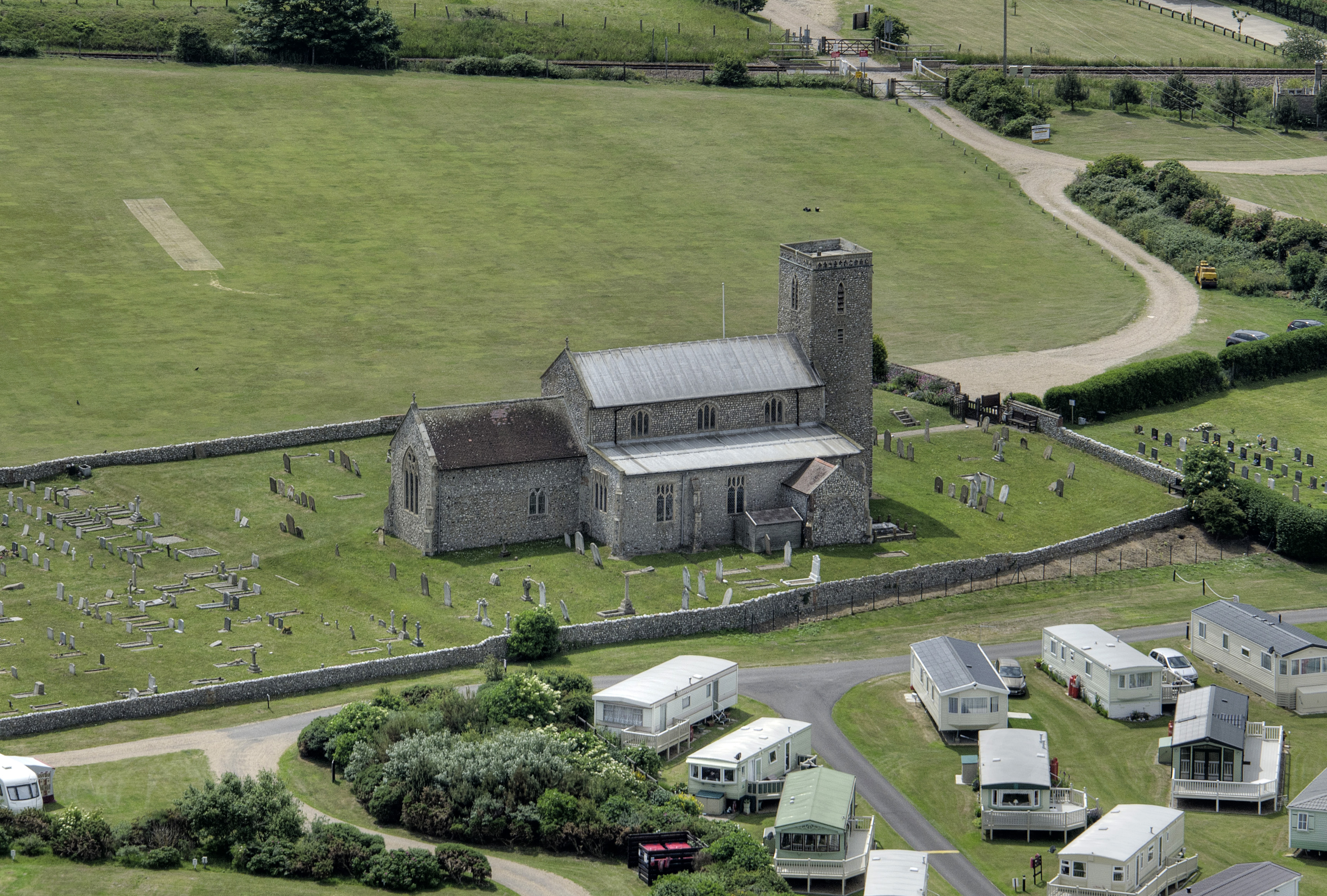
The church at Beeston Regis

Other features of the village are the parish church dedicated to All Saints, which is a Grade I listed building. The church dates from the latter part of the 11th century. The tower arch opening into the nave is 13th century, as are much of the chancel and nave walls.

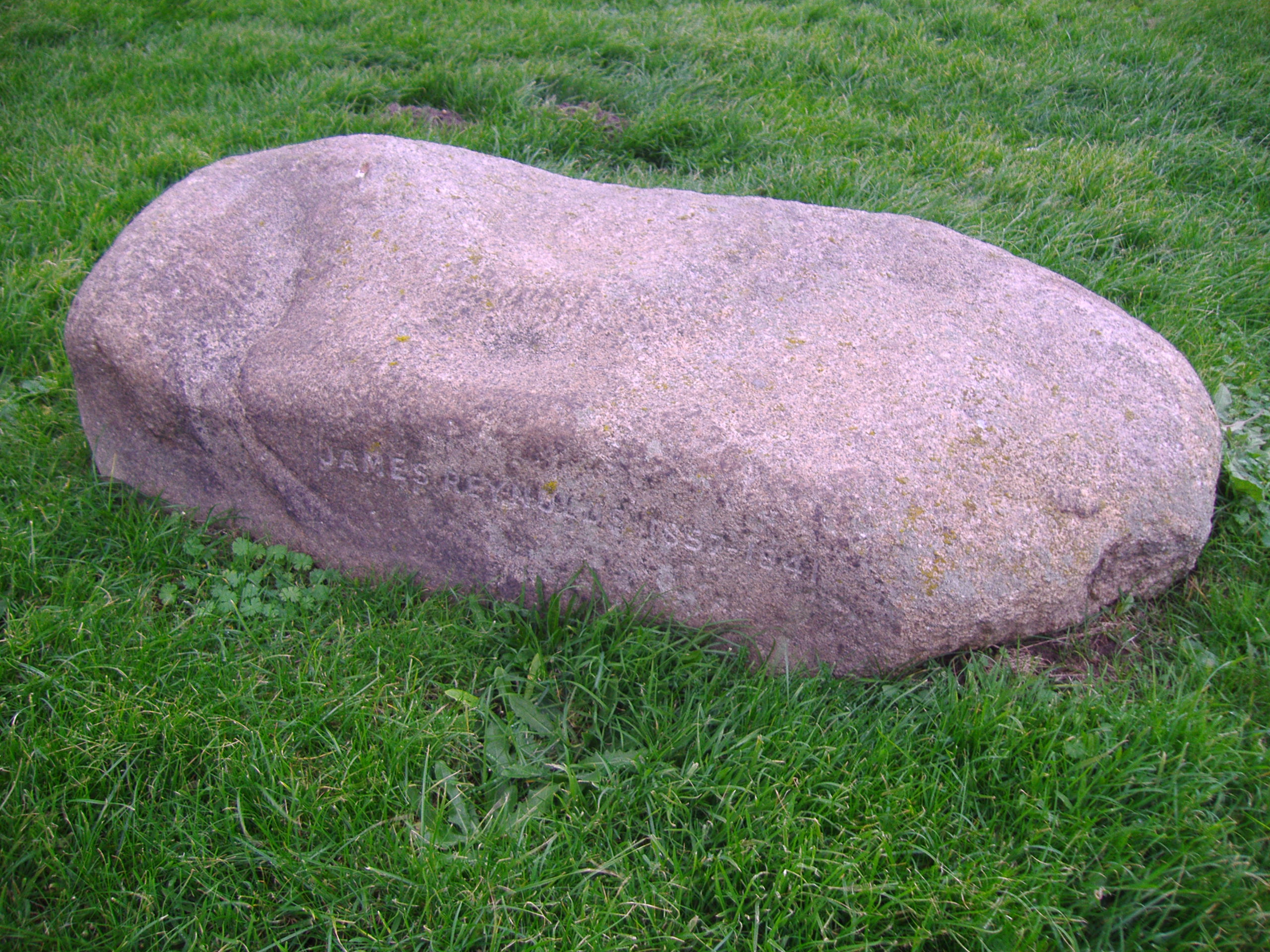
Farmer James Reynolds' headstone in Beeston Regis churchyard

Within the churchyard is a large stone covering a grave. On each side is inscribed the name of the grave's occupant: James Reynolds. This is originally one of a pair which stood at either side of a pathway in the yard of the farmhouse, in the grounds of the ruined Beeston Priory. The path itself led to what is now known as the Abbot's Freshwater Spring Pond.

== Education ==
Within the parish is Beeston Hall School, the largest boarding preparatory school in East Anglia. Beeston Regis Hall was once a family home of the Wyndham Ketton-Cremers on the Beeston Regis Estate, part of the much larger Felbrigg Estate, the family seat. In 1940 a German bomb hit the school, causing slight damage. The Hall was leased to Thomas Tapping and his wife Bessie, who opened the private Beeston Hall School in 1948. In 1967 the school became an incorporated trust, and in 1970, following the death of Robert Wyndham Ketton-Cremer, the last squire of Felbrigg, the school acquired the freehold and about 14 acres (5.7 ha) of land. Over the years the school has expanded; it is the biggest employer in the parish. It has also acquired other surrounding land including Beeston Hall Common, which it purchased from the parish of Beeston Regis.

== Beeston Hill ==
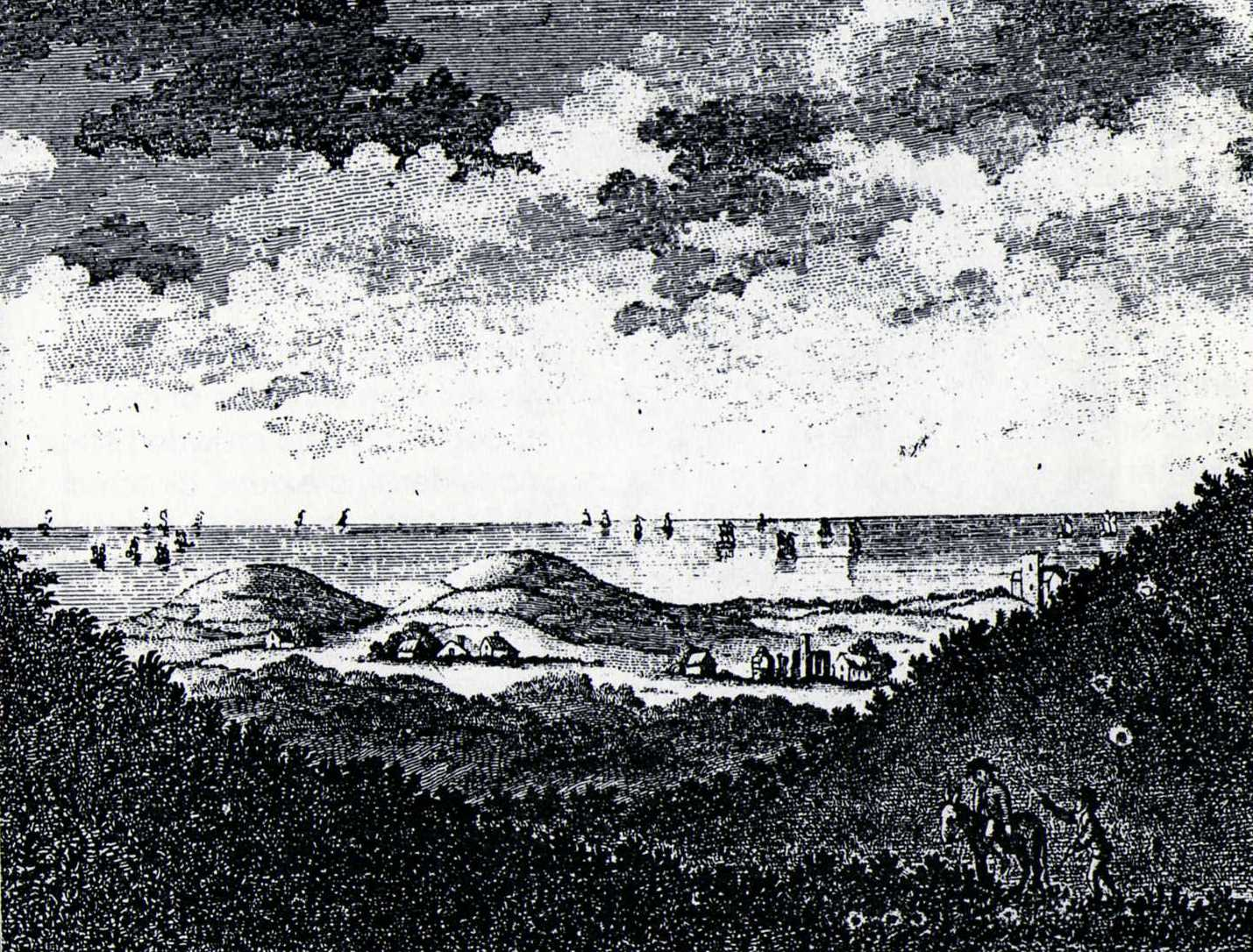
An etching of Beeston Hills, c. 1785

Beeston Hill, also known as Beeston Bump, is a cliff-top hill which overlooks the sea and the village. At 207 feet (63 m) high, it is the dominating feature of the parish. The hill, part of Cromer Ridge, was once two symmetrical round flat-topped hills in the shape of giant molehills: geological features known as kames. The two hills were left behind when glaciers retreated northwards at the end of the last Ice age, between 15,000 and 10,000 years ago, a recent event in geological timescales. At that time most of what is now the North Sea was dry land, with the Rhine and the Thames combining to form a giant river estuary. As the ice melted, the sea level rose and the North Sea was formed. Since then, the sea has eroded Beeston Bump: most of its seaward side had been washed away by the 1930s. Almost 90 yards (80m) of the cliff have now been lost to the sea, along with a brickworks which stood to the east of the summit and a football pitch. In recent times, coastal erosion has been slowed by building groynes and sea walls along the coast and below the hill.

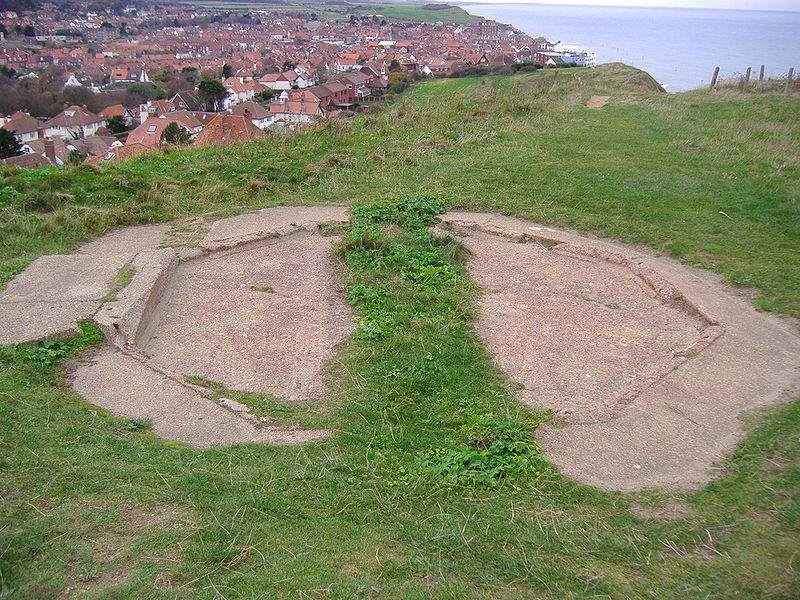
The remains of the Y-Station

During World War II the hill was the location for one of the network of Signals Intelligence collection sites called Y-stations. These collected material to be passed to the Government Code and Cypher School at Bletchley Park. There were several of these stations around the east coast and by triangulating the signals, the exact location of enemy shipping could be pinpointed. In an episode of the BBC1 series Coast, the technique was explained and demonstrated. The concrete remains of part of this facility can still be seen on the hill.

== See also ==
- Regis (Place)
- List of place names with royal patronage in the United Kingdom
- Sheringham War Memorial which records people from Beeston Regis
