= Bellville Sassoon =

British fashion salon

Coordinates: 51.491979°N 0.160898°W

- Industry: Clothing
- Founded: 1953
- Founder: Belinda Bellville
- Headquarters: Chelsea; London, SW1; United Kingdom
- Key people: Belinda Bellville, David Sassoon, Lorcan Mullany

Bellville Sassoon is a high end British fashion salon originally based on Pavilion Road, Knightsbridge, London, now located at 18 Culford Gardens in Chelsea.

== History ==
Bellville Sassoon was founded in 1953 by Belinda Bellville, who retired in 1981. It became Bellville Sassoon by name in 1970 after David Sassoon, who had joined the company in 1958 and remained for some 50 years. The company is currently run by Irish fashion designer Lorcan Mullany.

Bellville Sassoon actually has its origins in Belinda Bellville's grandmother, Cuckoo Leith, who ran a dress-shop in the 1920s. Belinda Bellville invited David Sassoon to join the firm in 1958.

Due to Sassoon's Jewish roots, Bellville Sassoon has become a notable Jewish fashion house, and according to Sassoon the salon has done "a tremendous amount for weddings and bar mitzvahs, because Jewish women like to dress up for these occasions. They have been very big business for us over the years."

== Late 20th century ==
Bellville counts numerous socialites and the royal family as amongst its clientele and was the most prolific of Princess Diana's early designers. Bellville Sassoon designed her "Gonzaga dress", amongst numerous other items of clothing. Sassoon has said, "When she got engaged, her mother brought her in to us and asked us to make the going-away outfit." Aside from Diana, Bellville Sassoon has designed clothes for Princess Margaret, Princess Michael of Kent, the Duchess of York, Jackie Kennedy, Audrey Hepburn, Elizabeth Taylor, Jerry Hall, Anita Baker, Melanie Griffith, Helen Mirren, Ivana Trump, Madonna, Jada Collins and Melissa Brown, and the salon's designs have appeared on the covers of Vogue and Harper's Magazine.

== 21st century ==
In recent years, due to old age, Sassoon has increasingly given responsibility to Irish designer Lorcan Mullany in the running of the company. The firm won the Export Award in 2005.
