= Scarrow Beck =

River in England

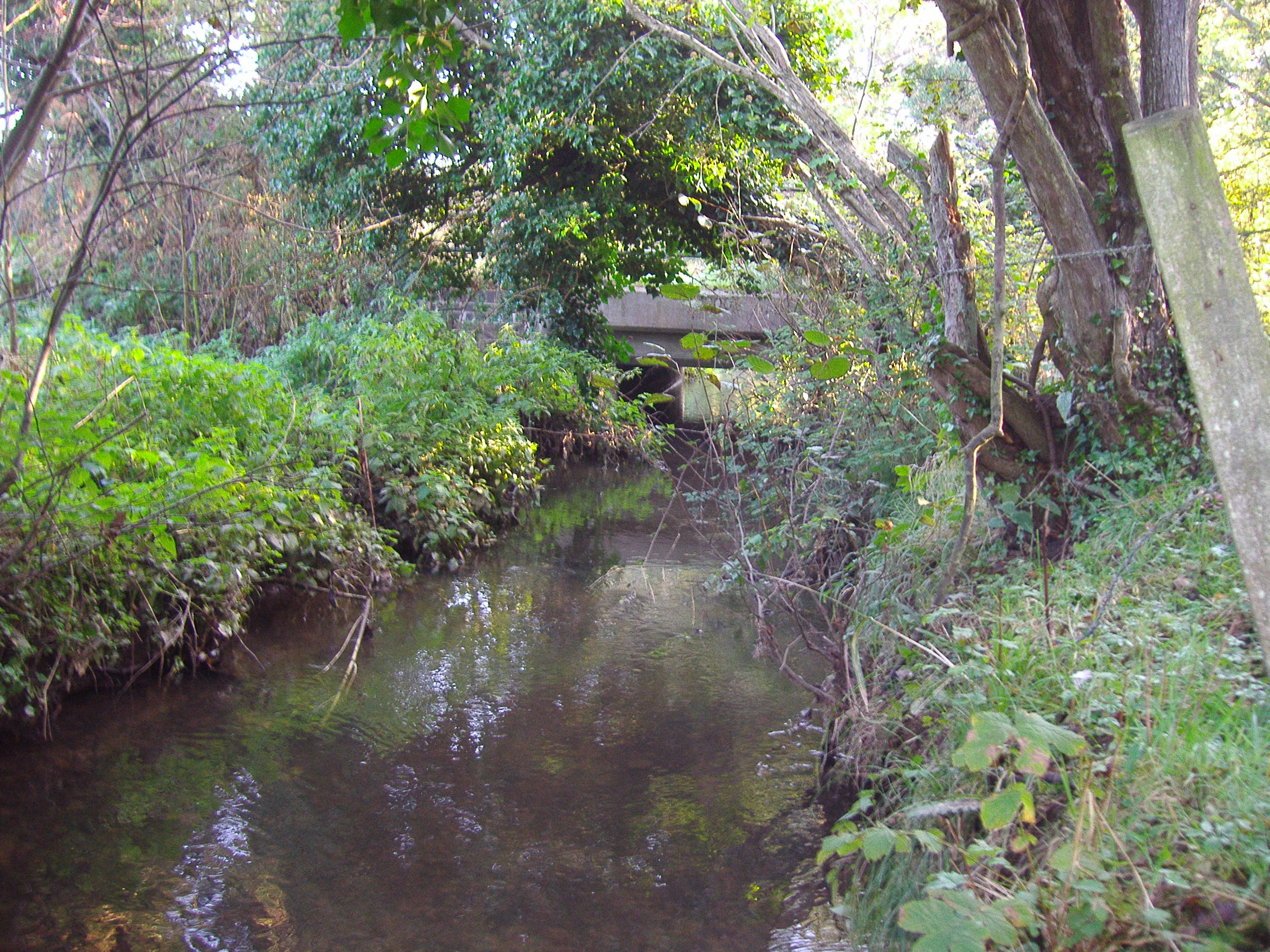
- Scarrow Beck on Hanworth Common

- Location of the mouth within Norfolk

Location
- Country: England
- County: Norfolk
- Region: East of England
- District: North Norfolk

Physical characteristics
- Source: In the Village of Aylmerton
- Mouth: Merges with the River Bure
  - coordinates: 52°49′26.2″N 1°14′0.5″E
- Length: 12.4 km (7.7 mi)

Basin features
- Tributaries
  - left: Gur Beck Merges at Sustead
- Watermills; Aldborough; Erpingham Total Fall; 51 meters from source to merger

Scarrow Beck is a minor watercourse. The beck rises in the north of the English county of Norfolk. It is a tributary of the River Bure. Its spring is in the North Norfolk village of Aylmerton west of the main street. It eventually merges, after 7.7 miles (12.4 km) with the River Bure at Ingworth just north of the Blickling Hall estate. There are two watermills on the beck, both of which are no longer in working order. A third watermill (as well as a windmill) at Gresham stands on Gur Beck, a small tributary of Scarrow Beck.

== The source ==
The spring of Scarrow Beck is in a small area of marshy ground in fields south of Aylmerton parish church close to Church Lane. The beck flows east, south, east through a man-made ditch across open fields towards the national trust estate of Felbrigg Hall. At the Boundary of the estate it enters a culvert under a lane and turns south, south, east. During the middle part of the 18th century the beck was dammed to form Felbrigg pond which was part of the landscape plans of the Estate. It is reputed but not confirmed that the forming of the pond may have been the early work of Humphry Repton, who, in 1778, lived close to the estate in Old Hall, Sustead. From the pond the beck flows on out of the estate and towards the village of Metton passing along the northern boundary of the water works in the village. Here it turns to the south crossing under the lane on the western outskirts of the village. Once again the beck has been ditched by man and crosses arable farm land. It is here that a tributary joins the beck from Gresham called Gur Beck. 200 meters from the merger the beck flows through Big Fen Plantation before reappearing on Hanworth Common. The Beck now flows around the western edge of the Common and is greatly supplemented by several small ditches, ponds and areas of marshy springs. After passing under Ringsbank Lane the beck skirts some woodland before supplying several large boomerang shaped ponds in Thurgarton woods. The next village is Aldborough and it is here, south of the village, that Scarrow Beck was the supply for the first of the two watermills on the beck.

== Aldborough watermill ==
There has been a watermilll at Aldborough at the buildings present location since before the Domesday Book although the present building, now a private dwelling, was built around 150 years ago. The Waterwheel was removed around 1930 and replaced with a diesel engine. In 1950, the Millpond that was fed by Scarrow Beck was bulldozed in and the beck was diverted away from the mill buildings. Today, there is no trace of the millrace or the old watercourse of Scarrow beck.

== Erpingham watermill ==
Erpingham watermill was demolished in 1965 and stood in a meadow on the eastern bank of Scarrow bank between the villages of Calthorpe and Erpingham. This watermill was recorded as the smallest watermill in the county of Norfolk and was not very efficient due to the lack of water supply from the Scarrow Beck. The mill relied for its water power on a hand dug watercourse from the near-by beck, remnants of which can still be found in the meadow. The mill itself was a timber structure constructed upon foundation and ground floor of brickwork construction. The upper floor of the mill was clad in shiplap weatherboarding. The roof was constructed using traditional Norfolk red pantile. At one time there was also a Smock windmill on the site but this was also demolished sometime in the 1890s. The two mills were owned by the Johnson family until they were sold at the turn of the 19th century when the site was purchased by a Mr Witham.

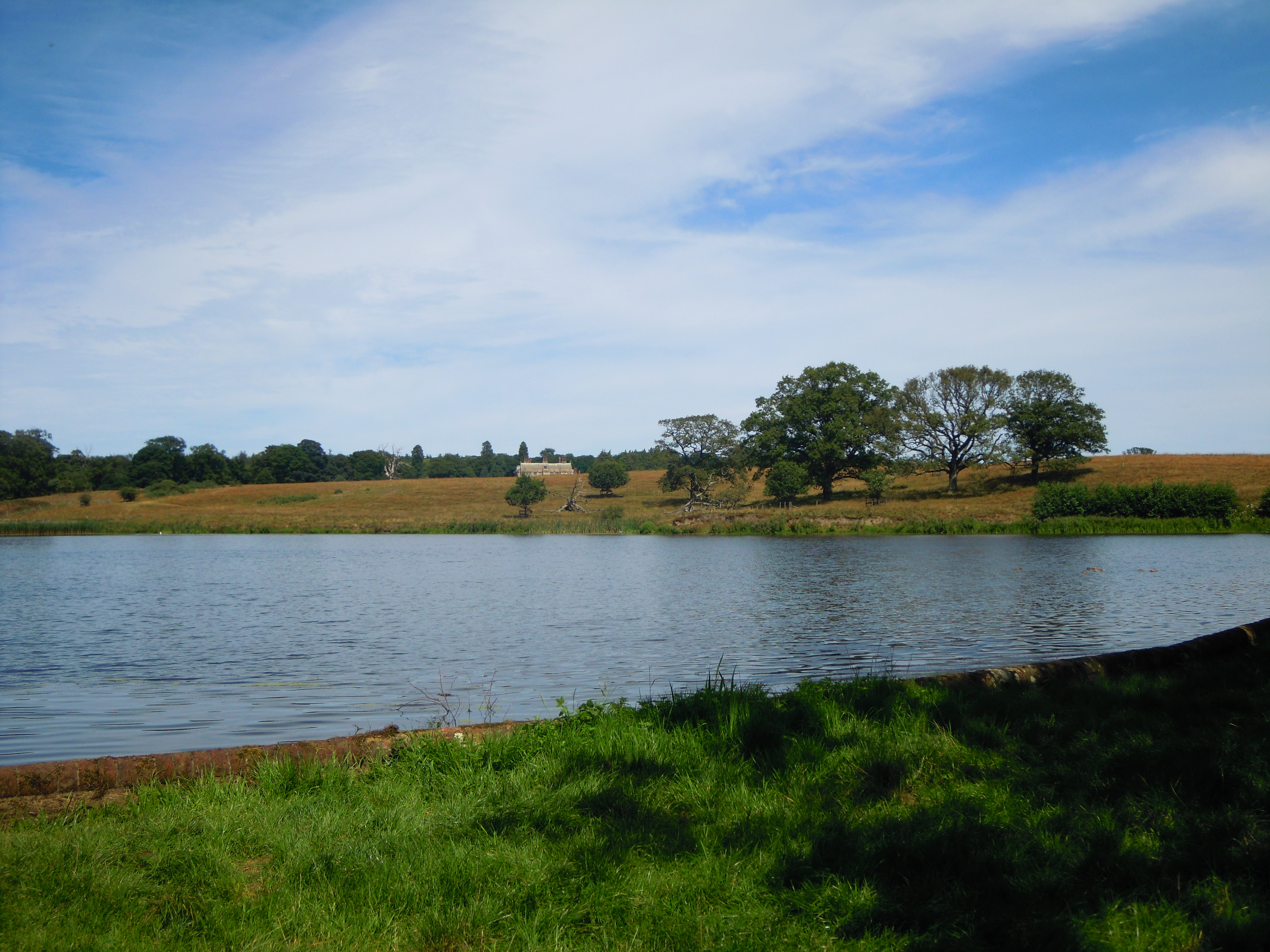
The lake on the Felbrigg estate formed when the Scarrow Beck was barraged.

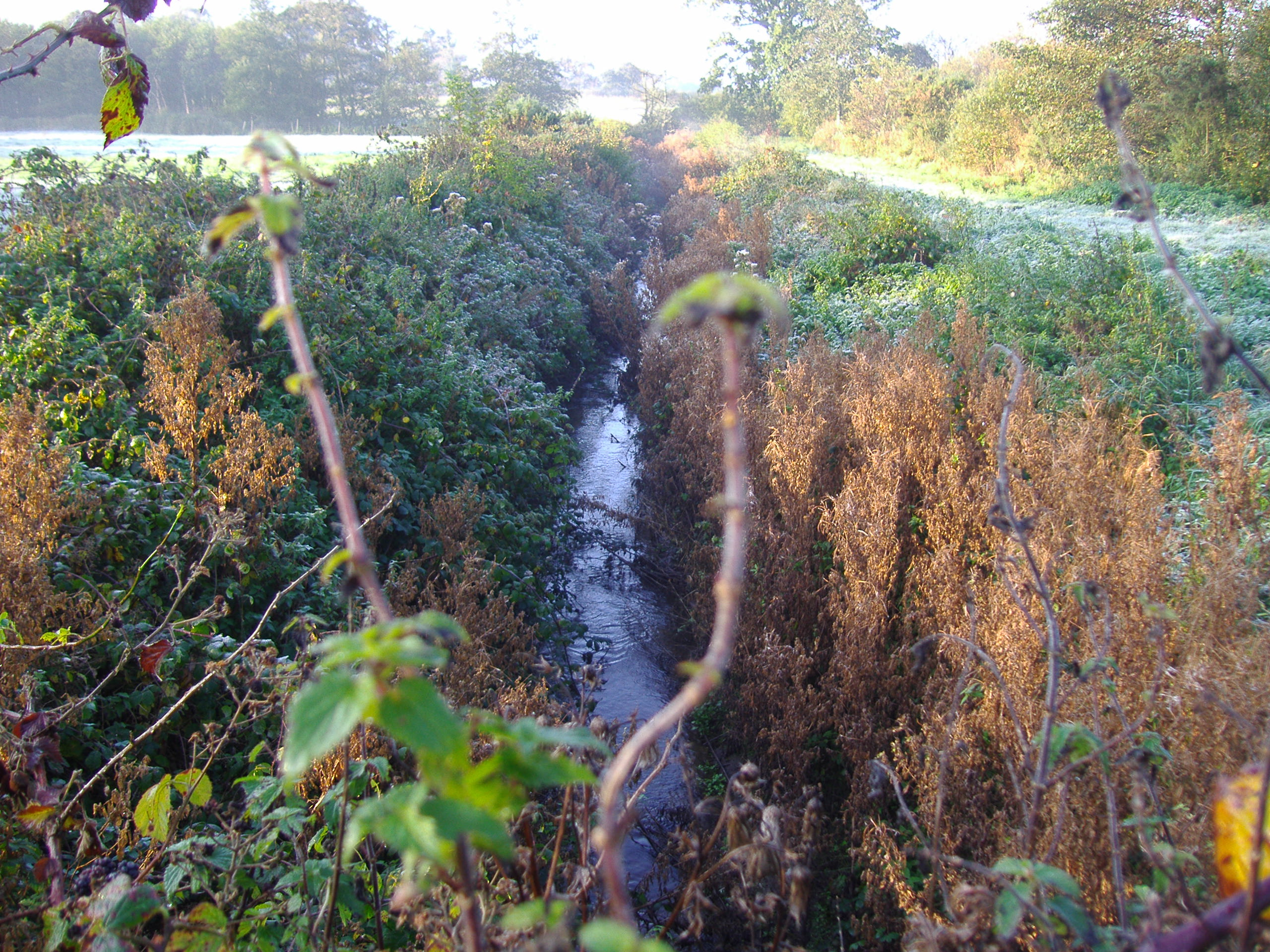
The beck north of the Felbrigg Estate near the village of Sustead.

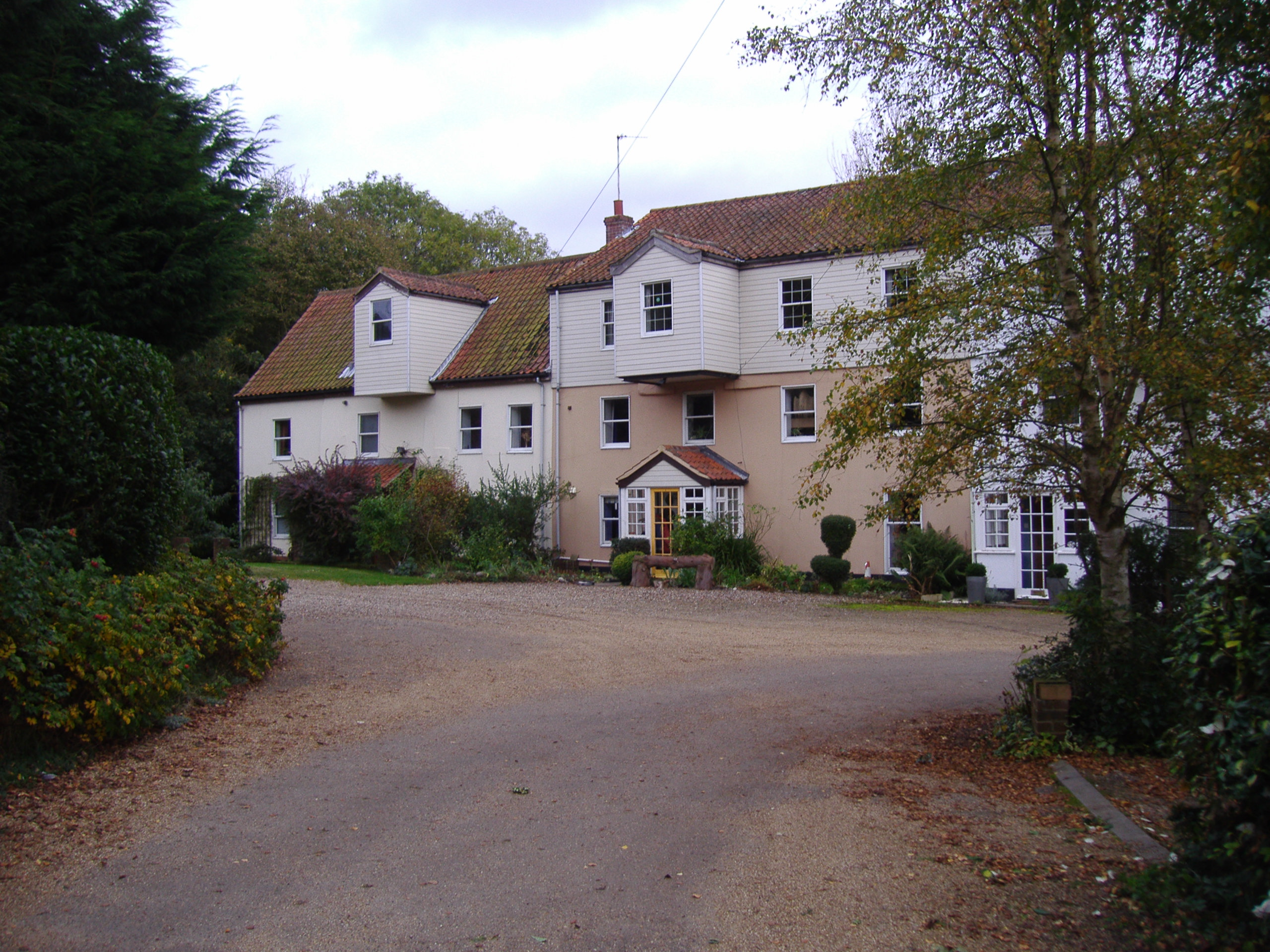
Aldborough Watermill today, now a private house
