= Gur Beck =

River in Norfolk, England

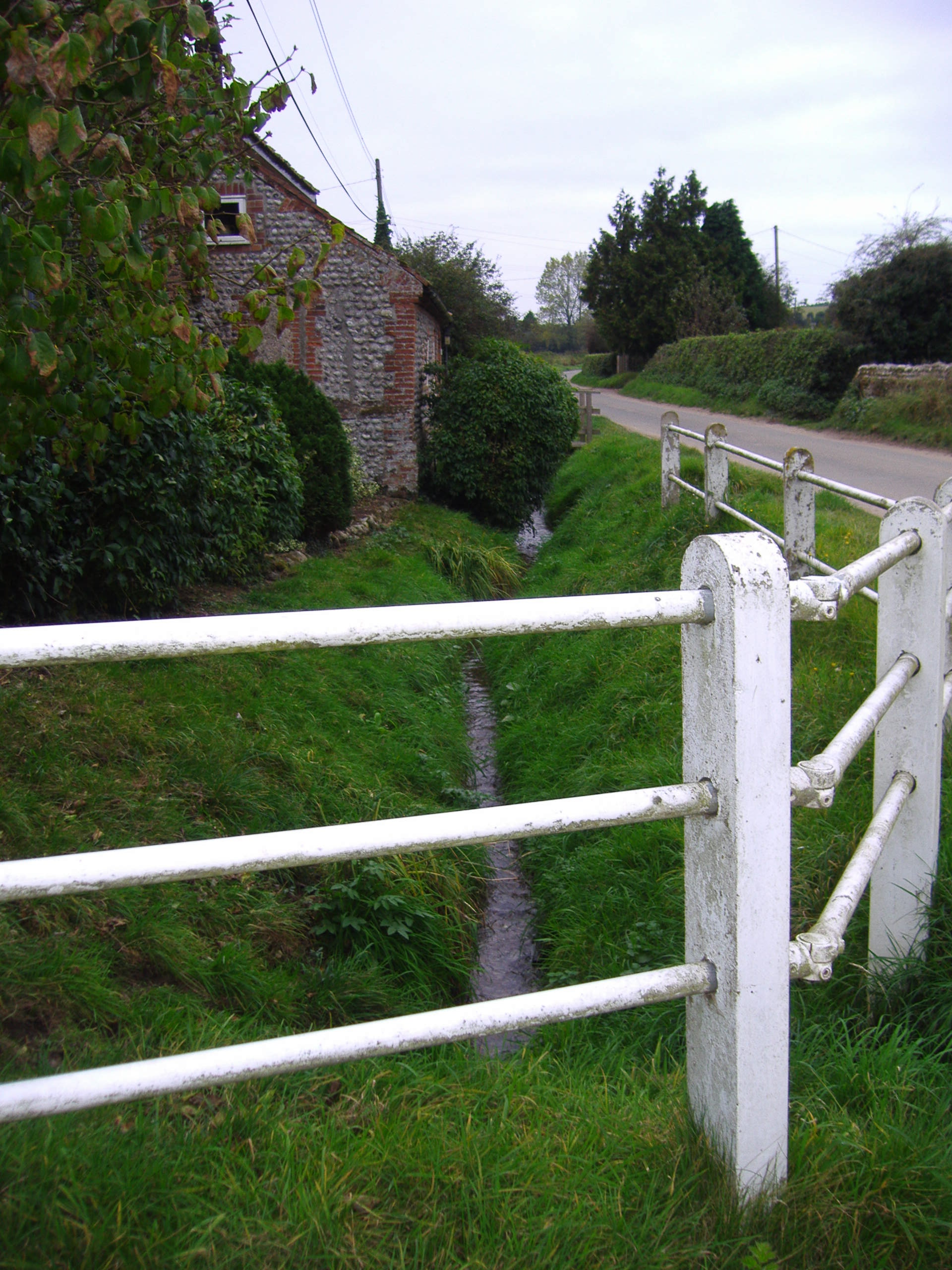
- Gur Beck in East Beckham

- Gur Beck Source within North Norfolk

Location
- Country: England
- State: Norfolk
- Region: East of England
- District: North Norfolk

Physical characteristics
- Source
  - location: Near the Village of West Beckham, East of England, England
  - elevation: 262 ft (80 m)
- Mouth: Merges with the Scarrow Beck
  - coordinates: 52°52′23.5″N 1°15′19.6″E
- Length: 4.2 mi (6.8 km)

Basin features
- Watermills: Gresham

Gur Beck is a minor watercourse. The beck rises in the north of the English county of Norfolk. It is a tributary of the Scarrow Beck. Its spring is a little east of the North Norfolk village of West Beckham. It eventually merges after 4.2 miles (6.8 km) with the Scarrow Beck at Sustead. There is one watermill on the beck. This can be found in the village of Gresham, but is no longer in working order.

== Gresham Castle moat ==
Just south of the village of Gresham are the remains of Gresham Castle, a moated fortified manor house that was once the property of the Paston family. The waters of the moat were once supplied from Gur beck which now has been re-directed and runs approximately 50 meters adjacent to the remains of the castle.

== Gresham Watermill ==
Gresham Watermill was only a small mill and today all that remains is the mill house with the watercourse channel and a small part of the foundations lying to the west side of the mill house. The site later became known as Old Watermill Farm and is in Lower Gresham. In 1819 the mill was powering two pairs of French burr stones, which were used to grind local wheat to produce flour.
