= John Gresham =

Lord Mayor of London in 1547

Sir John Gresham
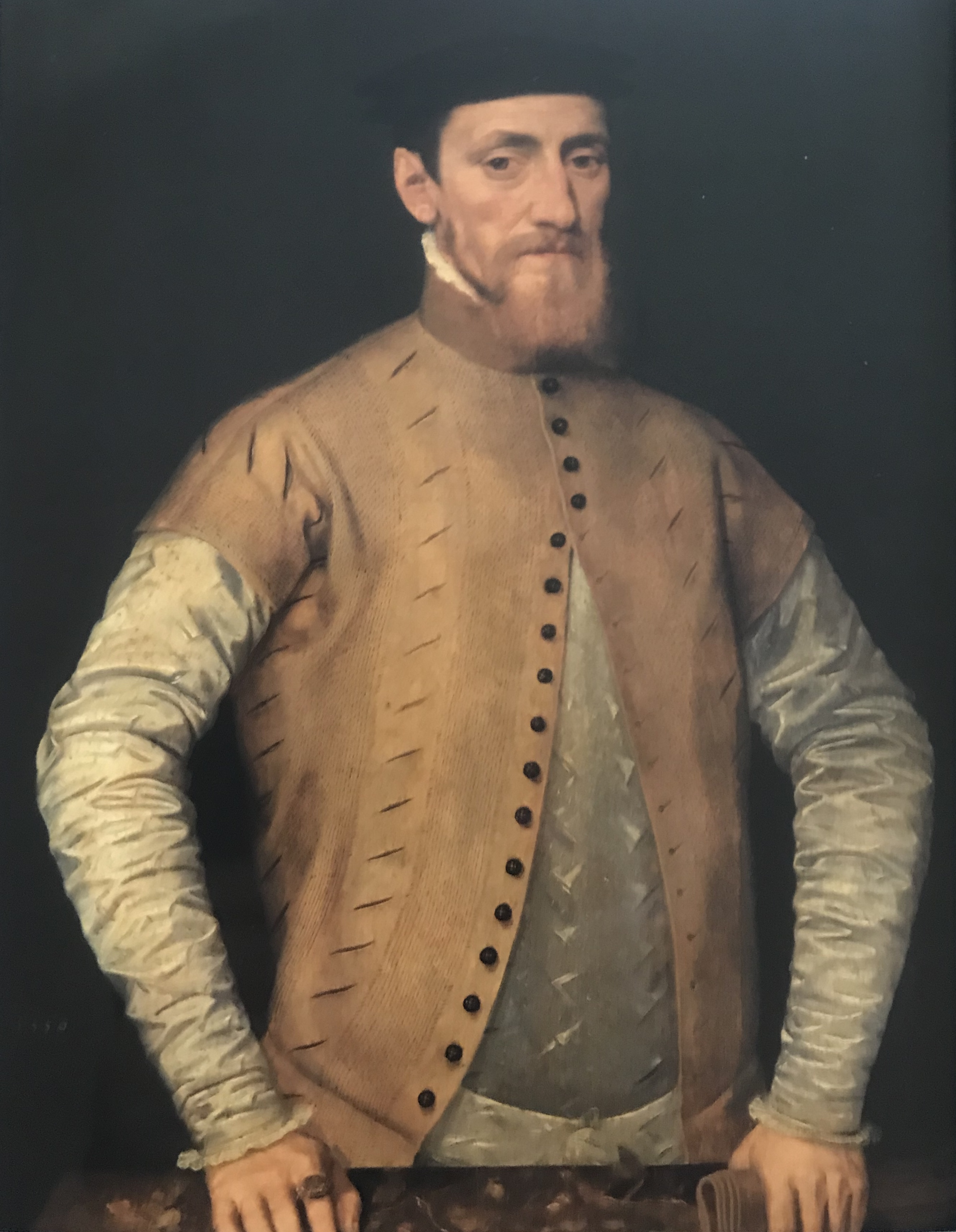

Lord Mayor of London
- In office 1547–1547
- Preceded by: Henry Huberthorn
- Succeeded by: Henry Amcotes

Personal details
- Born: 1495 Holt, Norfolk, England
- Died: 23 October 1556 (aged 60–61)
- Resting place: St Michael Bassishaw, City of London, England
- Relatives: Richard Gresham (brother)
- Occupation: Merchant, courtier, financier
- Known for: Founder of Gresham's School

Sir John Gresham (1495 – 23 October 1556) was an English merchant, courtier and financier who worked for King Henry VIII, Cardinal Thomas Wolsey, and Thomas Cromwell. He was Lord Mayor of London and founded Gresham's School. He was the brother of Sir Richard Gresham.

== Life ==
A son of John Gresham and his wife Alice Blyth, a daughter of Alexander Blyth, of Stratton, Gresham was born, probably in 1495, at the manor house of Holt in Norfolk, then occupied by his father. Descended from an old Norfolk family, he was the youngest of his father's four sons, his older brothers being William, the eldest, Thomas, and Richard. Biographers have suggested that he and his brothers probably attended a school kept by Augustinian canons at nearby Beeston Priory. At that time, England depended mostly on the clergy for education.

In about 1510, Gresham was apprenticed to John Middleton, a London mercer, and in 1517, after serving his seven years, he was admitted as a member of the Worshipful Company of Mercers. In 1519, he and his older brother William Gresham were both elected to the livery of the company. Later, John Gresham was four times Master of the Mercers' Company.

In partnership with his brother Richard Gresham, Gresham was in the business of exporting textiles overseas and importing grain from Germany and wine from Bordeaux. He also traded in silks and spices from the Ottoman Empire and imported timber and skins from the Baltic. He was a founding member of the Muscovy Company, formed to trade with what is now Russia. Meanwhile, he acted as an agent for Cardinal Thomas Wolsey, and through him knew Thomas Cromwell.

On one occasion, a cargo belonging to Gresham loaded for the English markets at Chios, which he said was worth 12,000 ducats (1,320 troy ounces of gold) was seized in Portugal by the owner there of the ship Gresham had hired. On 15 October 1531, Henry VIII wrote on his behalf to John III of Portugal, demanding that this be made good.

Gresham invested his money in land, buying the manors of Titsey, Tatsfield, Westerham, and Lingfield, on the borders of Surrey and Kent, as well as estates in Norfolk and Buckinghamshire. He lived at a great house called Titsey Place at Oxted in Surrey from 1534 until his death.

Gresham was Sheriff of London and Middlesex in 1537–1538 and at the same time was knighted. He was a member of the Royal household between 1527 and 1550, first as a gentleman pensioner and later as one of the esquires of the body of King Henry VIII. In 1539, the king granted Gresham the manor of Sanderstead in Surrey, following the dissolution of the monasteries: it had previously belonged to the Minster of Winchester since the year 962.

In 1541, Gresham was one of the jurors who tried Thomas Culpepper and Francis Dereham for treason - that is, intimacy with Queen Catherine Howard. Both were duly beheaded at Tyburn on 10 December 1541, and their heads were put on display on London Bridge. Queen Catherine was subsequently executed on 13 February 1542. In 1546, Gresham was one of the King's commissioners to survey the properties of the chantries to be dissolved in Surrey and Sussex.

In 1547, Sir John Gresham became Lord Mayor of London, and after the end of his year in office he continued to serve as an alderman.

In 1555, a year before his death, he founded Gresham's School (then described as "the Free Grammar School of Sir John Gresham, knight, citizen and alderman of London") in the town of his birth, Holt, Norfolk. Gresham endowed the school with land and money and placed these endowments in the care of the Worshipful Company of Fishmongers, which has continued to carry out his trust to the present day. He also left money to provide an exhibition of £20 a year (equivalent to £7,287 in 2025) to any boy from his school who proceeded either to Oxford or to Cambridge.

Gresham died on 23 October 1556 of a "malignant fever", seven days after he had made his last arrangements for the government of his new school at Holt. His funeral was described as "very grand and very papistical". The sermon was preached by the very Catholic John Harpsfield, Archdeacon of London, and as the funeral was on a day of fasting there was a grand fish dinner, at which all comers were welcome. Gresham's tomb was in the City of London church of St Michael Bassishaw, in which parish he had lived, and he was buried in a coat of armour of Damascus steel, with a sword, a helmet, and his standard. The next day, three masses were sung, one of the Trinity, one of Our Lady, and a Requiem mass.

== The Gresham family ==
The Gresham family had been settled in the Norfolk village of Gresham since at least the 14th century, and an early Victorian writer concluded that it seemed very likely that the manor of Gresham Castle was the ancestral home of the family.

A John Gresham was baptized in 1340 at Aylmerton, Norfolk, and died there in 1410, owning property in Aylmerton and an interest in the manor of Holt. His son John Gresham was born in 1390 and died in 1450. In 1414, he was living at Holt. His son, James Gresham, of Holt, Norfolk, was Lord of the manor of East Beckham, where he lived from 1442 to 1497, In the mid-fifteenth century he also built a manor house in the centre of the small town of Holt. His son John Gresham of Holt married Alice Blyth and was the father of the John Gresham born about 1495. A branch of the family was thus established at Holt by the fifteenth century.

Gresham had two brothers, William Gresham, and Sir Richard Gresham, Lord Mayor of London in 1537 and father of Sir Thomas Gresham, founder of the Royal Exchange and Gresham College, both in the City of London.

== Marriages and issue ==
Gresham married firstly, in 1521, Mary Ipswell, with whom he had twelve children between 1522 and 1538:

- William Gresham (1522–1579), who was the father of Sir Thomas Gresham (d.1630) of Titsey Place, whose sons were Sir John Gresham of Titsey (1588–1643) and Sir Edward Gresham of Titsey (1594–1647). The latter's son, Sir Marmaduke Gresham of Limpsfield (1627–1696), was created a baronet in 1660.
- John Gresham (born 13 March 1529), second son, who married on 17 July 1553, Elizabeth Dormer, daughter and heir of Edward Dormer, haberdasher, of London and Fulham and his wife, Katherine Sampson (see below). John Gresham and Elizabeth Dormer had three sons. After John Gresham's death his widow, Elizabeth, married William Plumbe (d.1593) of Northend near Fulham.
- Mary Gresham.
- Catherine Gresham.
- James Gresham.
- Edmund Gresham.
- Anthony Gresham.
- Ellen Gresham.
- Ursula Gresham (1534-1574), who married Thomas Leveson (1532-1576), son of the London mercer Nicholas Leveson (d.1539) and Denise or Dionyse Bodley (d.1561), the daughter of Thomas Bodley (d.1493) and Joan Leche (d. March 1530), by whom she was the mother of William Leveson (d.1621), one of two trustees used by Cuthbert Burbage, Richard Burbage, William Kempe, Thomas Pope (d.1603), Augustine Phillips (d.1605), John Heminges (bap. 1566, d. 1630) and William Shakespeare (1564-1616) to allocate shareholdings in the Globe Theatre in 1599.
- Cecily Gresham.
- Elizabeth Gresham.
- Richard Gresham.

Gresham married secondly, on 15 July 1553, Katherine Sampson (d.1578), widow of Edward Dormer (d.1539), brother of Sir Michael Dormer, Lord Mayor of London in 1541.

=== Descendants of Sir John Gresham ===
Most of Gresham's twelve children died without issue, but the senior line of Gresham's descendants continued until the early nineteenth century.

The 17th century Greshams sat as Members of Parliament, loyally supported King Charles I throughout the Civil War, and suffered from the victory of Cromwell. In 1643 the house at Titsey was commandeered by the Parliamentarians, but at the time of the Restoration in 1660 the new King Charles II created the head of the family, Marmaduke Gresham, a baronet as a reward for the family's support for the Royalist cause. The Gresham baronets came to an end with Sir John Gresham, sixth and last Baronet, of Limpsfield (who died in 1801). However, his daughter and heiress Katherine Maria Gresham had married William Leveson-Gower, a first cousin of the Marquess of Stafford, later the first Duke of Sutherland, and through Katherine Maria the Titsey estate continued to be owned by Sir John Gresham's descendants until the death of Thomas Leveson Gower in 1992. By his will, Leveson Gower set up the Titsey Foundation, a charitable trust with the aim of preserving the estate for the benefit of the nation.

Nevertheless, the first Sir John Gresham's line continues in the descendants of his third son, another John Gresham, who was the ancestor of the Greshams of Fulham, Albury, and Haslemere.

== Gresham's School ==
In 1555, shortly before his death, Gresham founded Gresham's School in his home town of Holt, Norfolk, placing its endowments under the stewardship of the Worshipful Company of Fishmongers, which has continued to carry out the task entrusted to it until the present day.

== Associations ==
Sir Rowland Hill, publisher of the Geneva Bible, was a close friend of Sir John Gresham and was provided with a black gown to attend his funeral and served as his executor.

== The Gresham Grasshopper ==
The Gresham grasshopper

The grasshopper is the crest above Sir John Gresham's coat of arms. It can be seen at Titsey Place, his country house, and is used by Gresham's School, which he founded. It can also be seen as the weathervane on the Royal Exchange in the City of London, founded in 1565 by Gresham's nephew Sir Thomas Gresham. Gresham's original Royal Exchange building (destroyed in the Great Fire of London of 1666) was profusely decorated with grasshoppers. The grasshopper is also used as a symbol by Gresham College in the City of London, which Sir Thomas also established.

According to an ancient legend of the Greshams, the founder of the family, Roger de Gresham, was a foundling abandoned as a new-born baby in long grass in North Norfolk in the 13th century and found there by a woman whose attention was drawn to the child by a grasshopper. A beautiful story, it is more likely that the grasshopper is simply an heraldic rebus on the name Gresham, with gres being a Middle English form of grass (Old English grœs).

In the system of English heraldry, the grasshopper is said to represent wisdom and nobility.

The Gresham family motto is Fiat voluntas tua ('Thy will be done').
