= Marmaduke Gresham =

English politician and aristocrat (c. 1627-1696)

Sir Marmaduke Gresham, 1st Baronet (c. 1627 – 14 April 1696) was an English politician who sat in the House of Commons in 1660 and from 1685 to 1689.

Gresham was the son of Sir Edward Gresham, of Limpsfield and Titsey, Surrey, and the grandson of Sir Thomas Gresham. He was baptised at Betchworth on 24 January 1627. He matriculated from King's College, Cambridge in autumn 1645.

In 1660, Gresham was elected as one of the members of parliament for East Grinstead, sitting in the Convention Parliament. He was created Baronet of Lympsfield in the County of Surrey on 31 July 1660. In 1685 he was elected as member for Bletchingley and held the seat until 1689.

He married Alice Corbet, a daughter of Richard Corbet, Bishop of Norwich.

Gresham died at Gresham College, London, at the age of 69 and was buried at Titsey. He divided his estate of Lovested Down, Tatsfield, between his son Charles and his daughter Alice.

Baronetage of England
New creation	Baronet (of Lympsfield); 1660–1696	Succeeded by Edward Gresham
