= Battisford =

Village in Suffolk, England

Coordinates: 52.149°N 1.002°E

- St. Mary's church, Battisford

- Location within Suffolk
- Interactive map of Battisford
- Population: 482 (2001 census); 458 (2011 census)
- District: Mid Suffolk
- Shire county: Suffolk
- Region: East
- Country: England
- Sovereign state: United Kingdom
- Post town: Stowmarket
- Postcode district: IP14

Battisford is a village and civil parish in the Mid Suffolk district of Suffolk, England. The village lies approximately 4 miles (6 km) south of Stowmarket and is directly alongside Wattisham Airfield.

== Geography ==
Battisford is located in a rural area characterised by agricultural farmland. The principal route through the village is Straight Road, which extends for over a mile and is noted for its unusually straight alignment.

== History ==
Historically it was located in Bosmere and Claydon Hundred. The Knights of St. John had a preceptory for Suffolk at Battisford. In the 12th century Henry II granted the Battisford Preceptory land in East Bergholt.

Oak timber from Battisford Common was used in the construction of the original Royal Exchange, London during the reign of Queen Elizabeth I. The large timber framework was reportedly assembled at Battisford Tye before being dismantled and transported to London, where it formed the structural frame of Sir Thomas Gresham’s exchange building at Cornhill.

In 1901 the population was 390, and the parish covered 1 542 acres.

In 1983, Battisford declared its independence just for one day, from the United Kingdom.

== Community and amenities ==
The village contains St Mary’s Parish Church and Battisford Free Church, both of which serve the local community.

Other facilities include Battisford Village Hall, a village green with a children's play area, and the village pub, The Punch Bowl Inn.

The Punch Bowl operates as a Community Interest Company (CIC) and is noted as the first pub of its kind in Suffolk.

== Governance ==
Battisford is administered by Battisford Parish Council and forms part of the Mid Suffolk district. It lies within the parliamentary constituency of Central Suffolk and North Ipswich.
