= Gresham baronets =

Extinct baronetcy in the Baronetage of England

The Gresham Baronetcy, of Lympsfield in the County of Surrey, was a title in the Baronetage of England. It was created by Charles II on 31 July 1660, soon after his restoration to the throne, for Marmaduke Gresham, who had been a Member for East Grinstead of the Convention Parliament which led the king's restoration. A descendant of Sir John Gresham, a 16th-century Lord Mayor of London, he was later a member of parliament for Bletchingley.

The second Baronet also represented Bletchingley in parliament. The title became extinct on the death of the sixth Baronet in 1801.

== Gresham baronets, of Lympsfield (1660) ==
- Sir Marmaduke Gresham, 1st Baronet (1627–1696)
- Sir Edward Gresham, 2nd Baronet (1649–1709)
- Sir Charles Gresham, 3rd Baronet (1660–1718)
- Sir Marmaduke Gresham, 4th Baronet (1700–1742)
- Sir Charles Gresham, 5th Baronet (died 1750)
- Sir John Gresham, 6th Baronet (1735–1801)
