= Sustead =

Village in Norfolk, England

Coordinates: 52.8856°N 1.2506°E

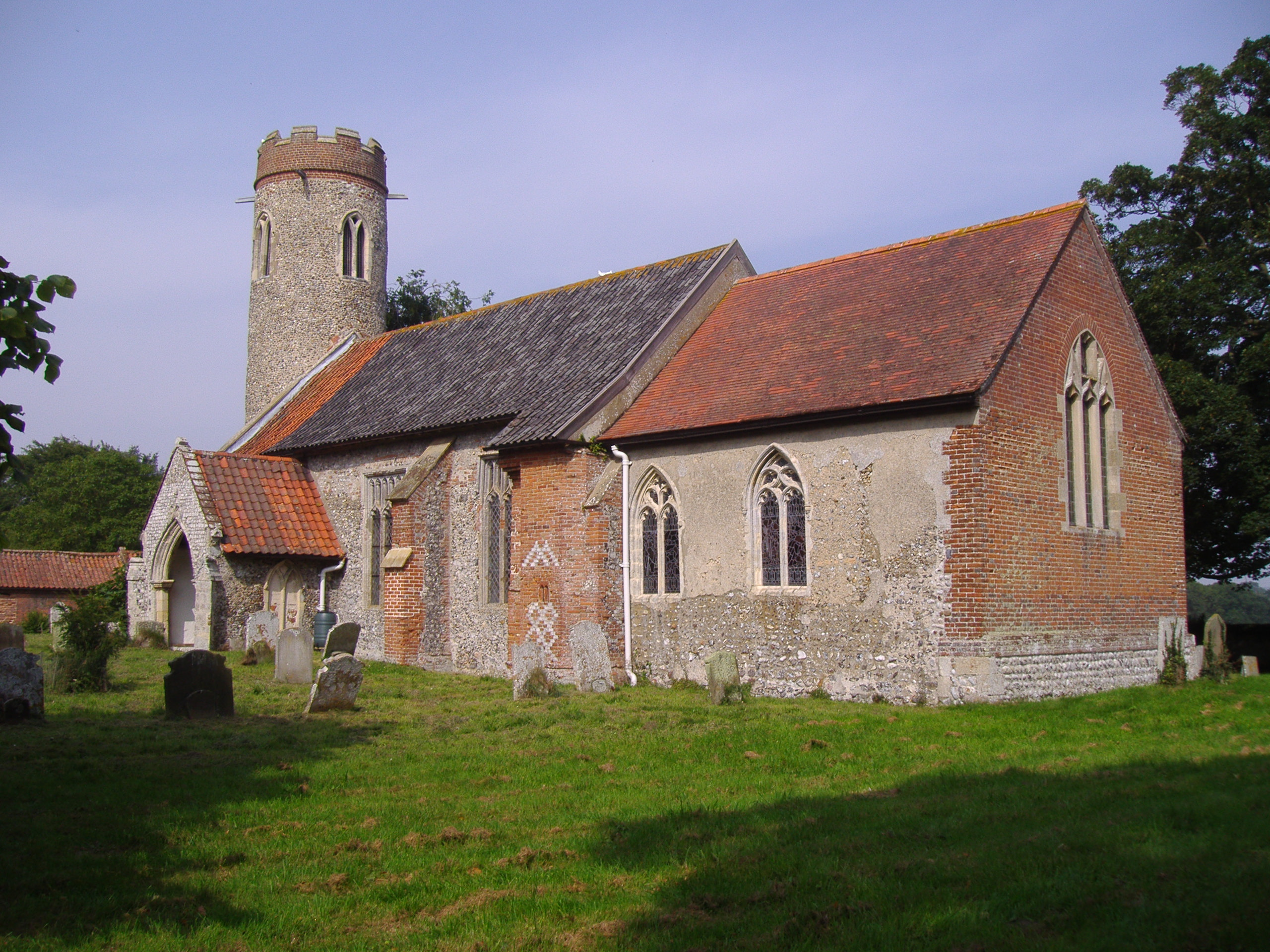
- The parish church of St Peter and St Paul

- Location within Norfolk
- Area: 6.84 km^{2} (2.64 sq mi)
- Population: 215 (parish, 2011 census)
  - Density: 31/km^{2} (80/sq mi)
- OS grid reference: TG1836
  - London: 135 miles
- Civil parish: Sustead
- District: North Norfolk
- Shire county: Norfolk
- Region: East
- Country: England
- Sovereign state: United Kingdom
- Post town: Norwich
- Postcode district: NR11
- Police: Norfolk
- Fire: Norfolk
- Ambulance: East of England
- UK Parliament: North Norfolk

Sustead is a small village and parish in the county of Norfolk, England, about four miles south-west of Cromer. The parish also includes the villages of Bessingham and Metton. The parish is bounded by Aldborough and Hanworth to the south, Roughton to the east, Felbrigg and Aylmerton to the north and Gresham to the west.

== History ==
The villages name means 'South place'.

Sustead has an entry in the Domesday Book of 1086. Sustead is recorded by the names Surstede and Sutstede. The main land holder was William de Warren and the main tenant was Roger Bigot. The survey also states there were 1½ mills.

== The parish church of Saint Peter and Saint Paul ==
The earliest parts of this church are Saxon but over the years it has been added to and altered by the Normans, Tudors and Victorians. The nave reflects all these periods in its decoration. The north and south doorways date from the 14th century whilst the square headed windows date from the 15th century. There are fragments of mediaeval stained glass in the south window. Behind the pulpit there are the signs of a blocked off, long demolished north transept. There is an octagonal font which dates from the 15th century. The pulpit is from the 17th century and is decorated with heads of angels. The pulpit was originally from the church at North Barningham. The screen dates from the 14th century. The church has a round tower which is 48 feet (15 metres) tall and has a diameter of 7 feet (2 metres). The walls are 3 ft 4ins (1 metre) thick. The lower part of this round tower is from the Saxon period. The higher reaches were built in the 14th and 15th century. The tower has a single bell which was cast between 1400 and 1425. The south porch of the church is late 14th century but underwent restoration work in 1896.

== Church gallery ==
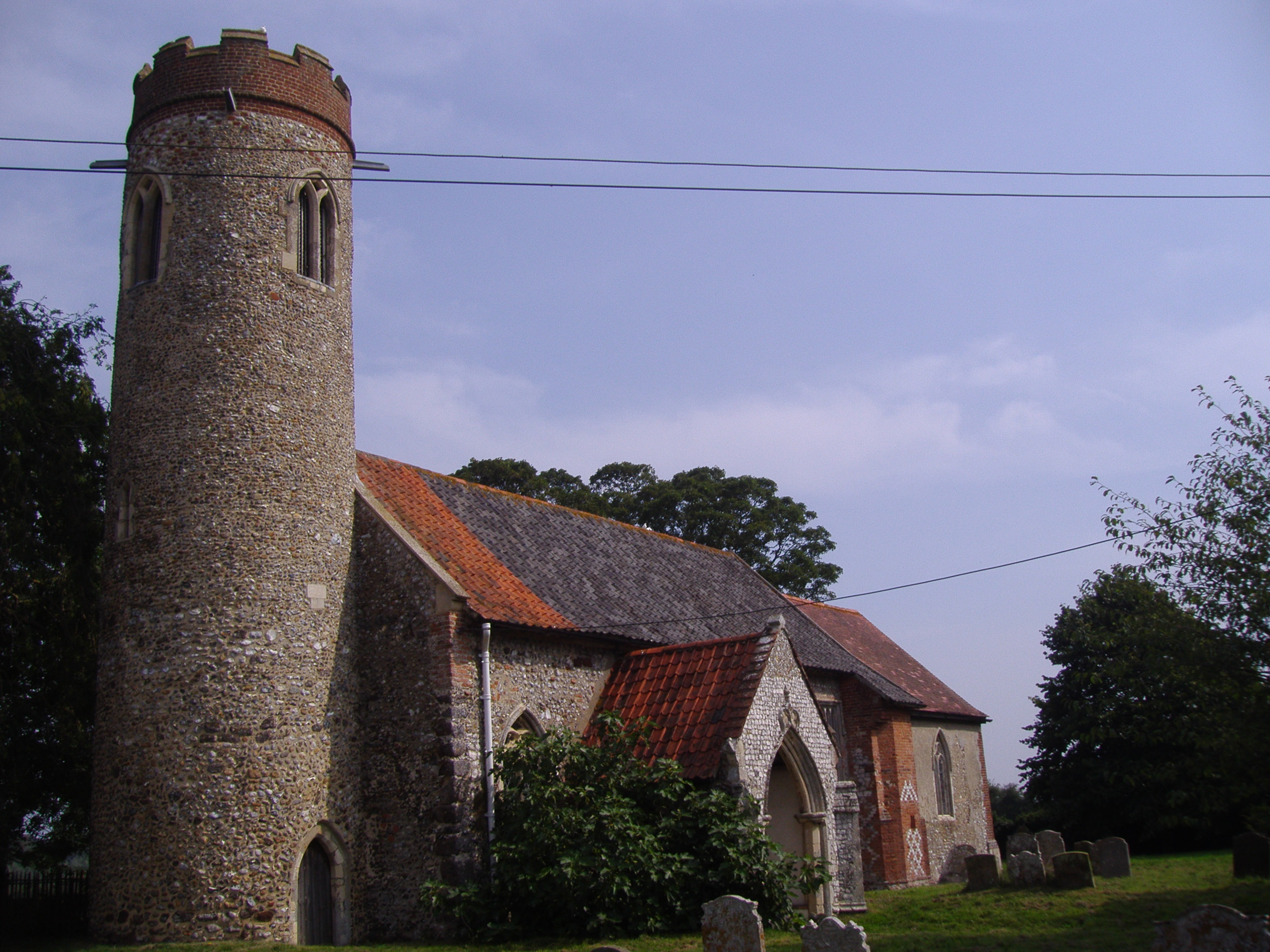
The round tower

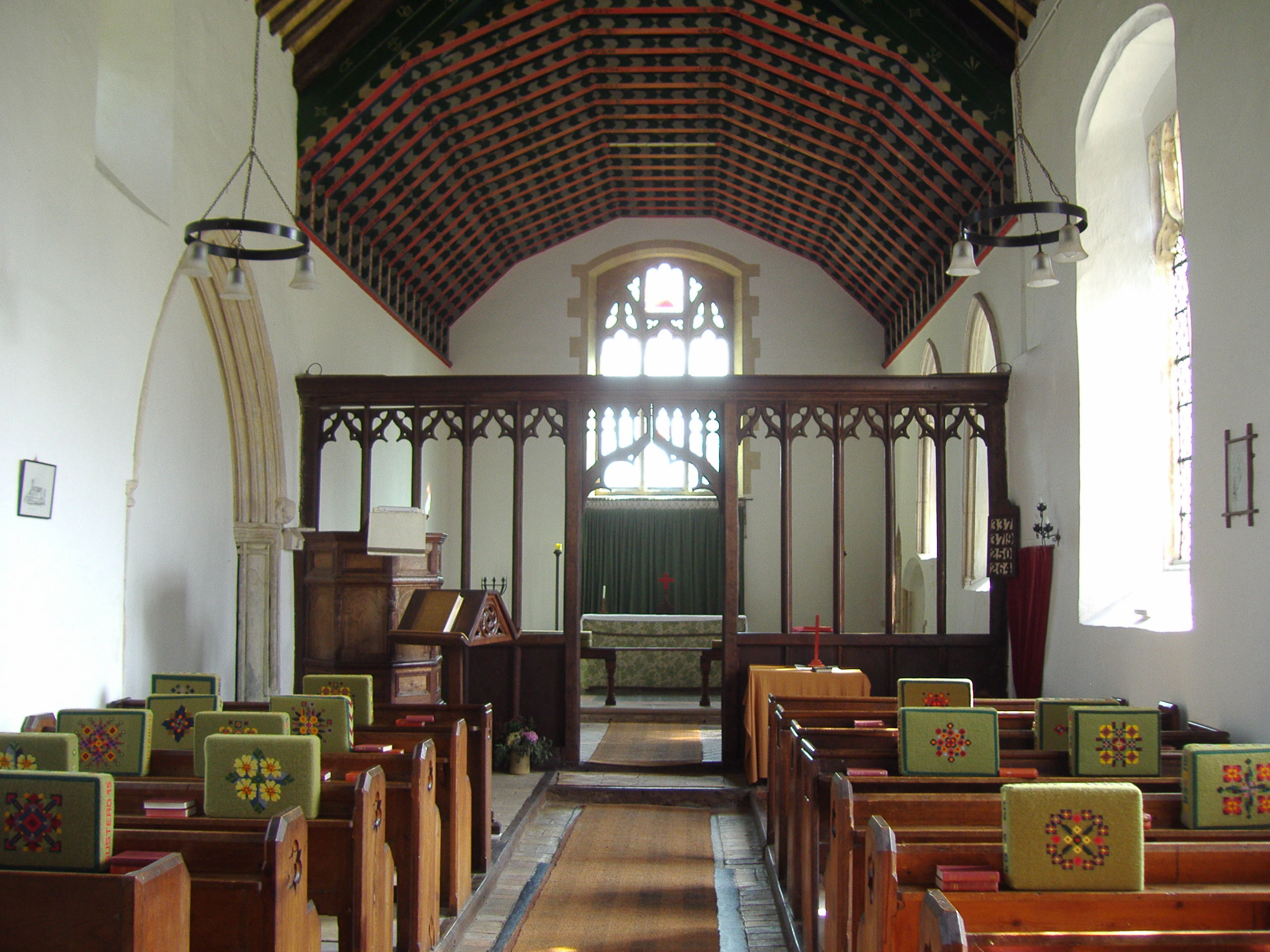
The chancel and screen

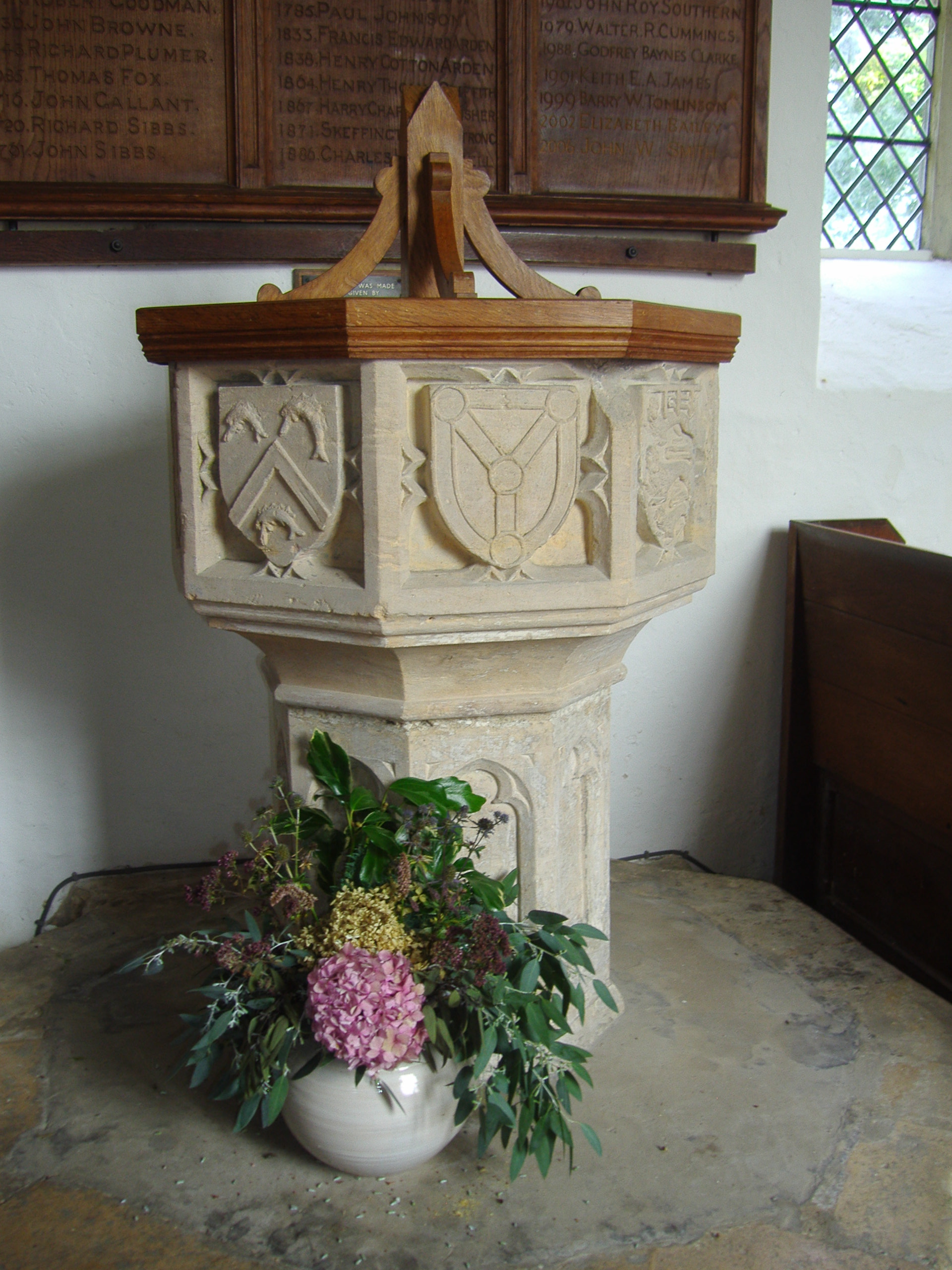
The font

== Notable people ==
Humphry Repton, landscape designer, lived in Sustead.

== Village gallery ==
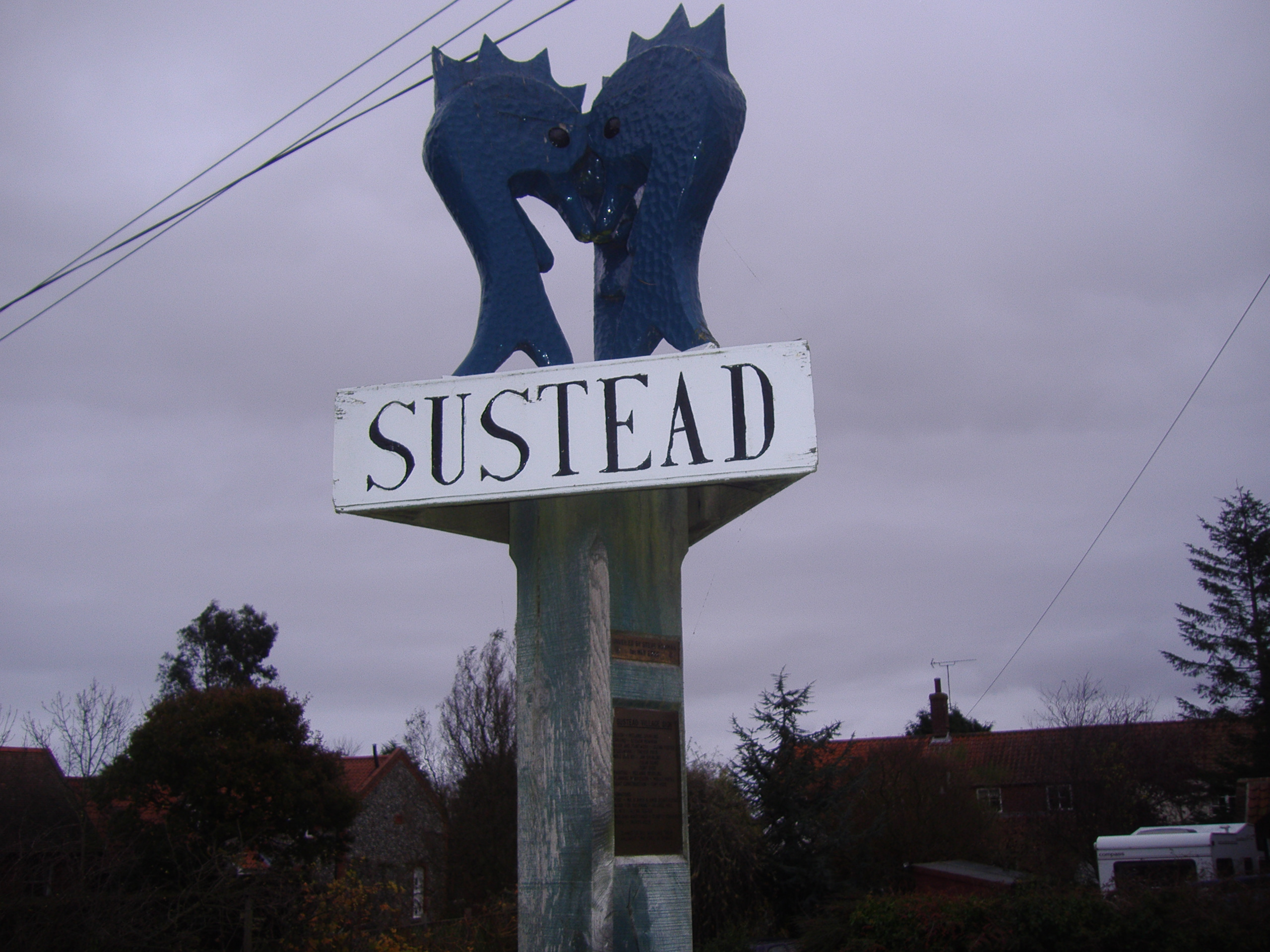
The Village sign
