= Battisford Preceptory =

Monastery in Battisford, Suffolk, England

Battisford Preceptory was a medieval monastic of the Knights of St John house in Battisford, Suffolk, England. The site is situated 4.5 km south of Stowmarket and 1 km west of the village of Battisford. All that remains at the site today, apart from the place-name 'St John's Manor House', are part of the moat.

== Preceptors of Battisford ==
The preceptory was the responsibility of a preceptor. In complete records identify some of those who filled this role.

- John de Accoumbe, occurs 1321
- Richard de Bachesworth, occurs 1328
- Henry Haler, (fn. 14) died 1480 at the Siege of Rhodes
- Giles Russel, (fn. 15) c. 1530

After the dissolution of the order Henry VIII granted this preceptory to Andrew Judde, alderman of London in July 1543. On 18 April 1544 it was transferred by licence of alienation to Sir Richard Gresham.
