= Gresham Castle =

Castle in Norfolk, England

- North Norfolk, East of England, Norfolk
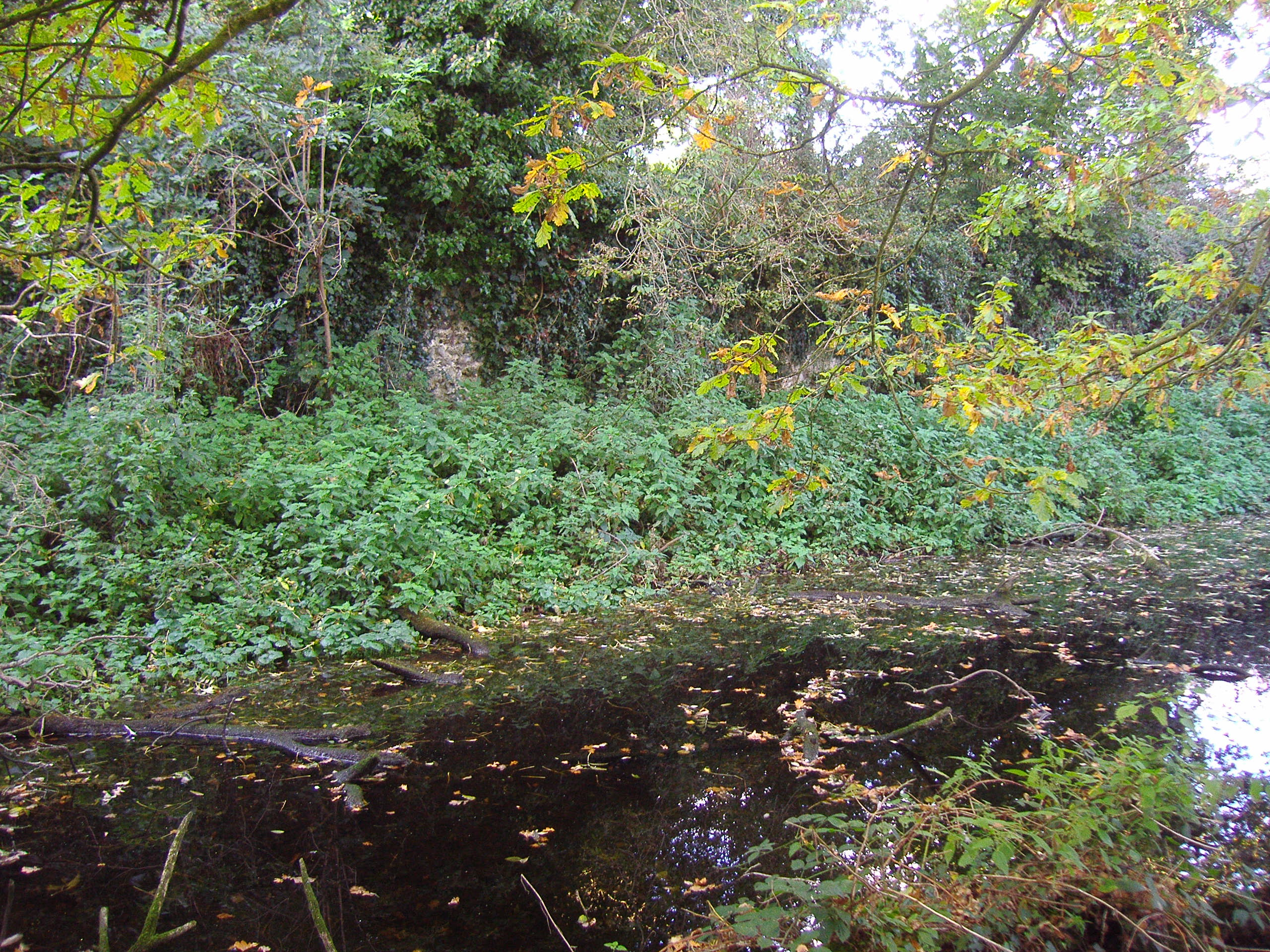
- The overgrown curtain walls of Gresham Castle

Site information
- Type: Castle

Location
- Gresham castle within Norfolk
- Coordinates: 52.8964°N 1.2197°E

Site history
- Built: Fortified in 1318

Gresham Castle is a medieval castle located south of the village of Gresham in the north of the English county of Norfolk. The medieval castle was actually a fortified manor house.

In 1318, Sir Edmund Bacon granted a licence to crenellate his manor house. Gresham was one of a group of late castles to be fortified or built along the east coast that include Baconsthorpe, Caister, Claxton and Mettingham Castle in Suffolk.

== History ==
In 1427 the castle and manor of Gresham was purchased by the lawyer William Paston to add to his already large property holdings in Norfolk. Paston purchased the castle and manor from Thomas Chaucer of Ewelme and Sir William Moleyns, who each owned half of the property. However, the legality of the purchase was challenged by the Wiltshire peer, Robert Hungerford, Lord Moleyns, 2nd Baron Hungerford. Consequently, when William Paston died he left a large and valuable inheritance including Gresham Castle to his son John Paston. Lord Moleyns' longstanding claim to half of the property was encouraged by John Paston's bitter rival John Haydon of nearby Baconsthorpe Castle. On 17 February 1448 forces led by Lord Moleyns took direct action and entered the fortified manor house and began to collect rent from the tenants of the manor. After these actions, John Paston petitioned the king, and after his appeals Paston reclaimed his property on 6 October. On 28 January, Moleyns with a force of a one thousand men made up of some locals and retainers from Wiltshire, occupied the castle once more this time forcible evicting John Paston's wife Margaret and twelve of her servants. A lieutenant of Moleyns by the name of Partridge was left to barricade the castle against any attempt by Paston to reclaim his property. In the Paston Letters Margaret explains to her husband John:

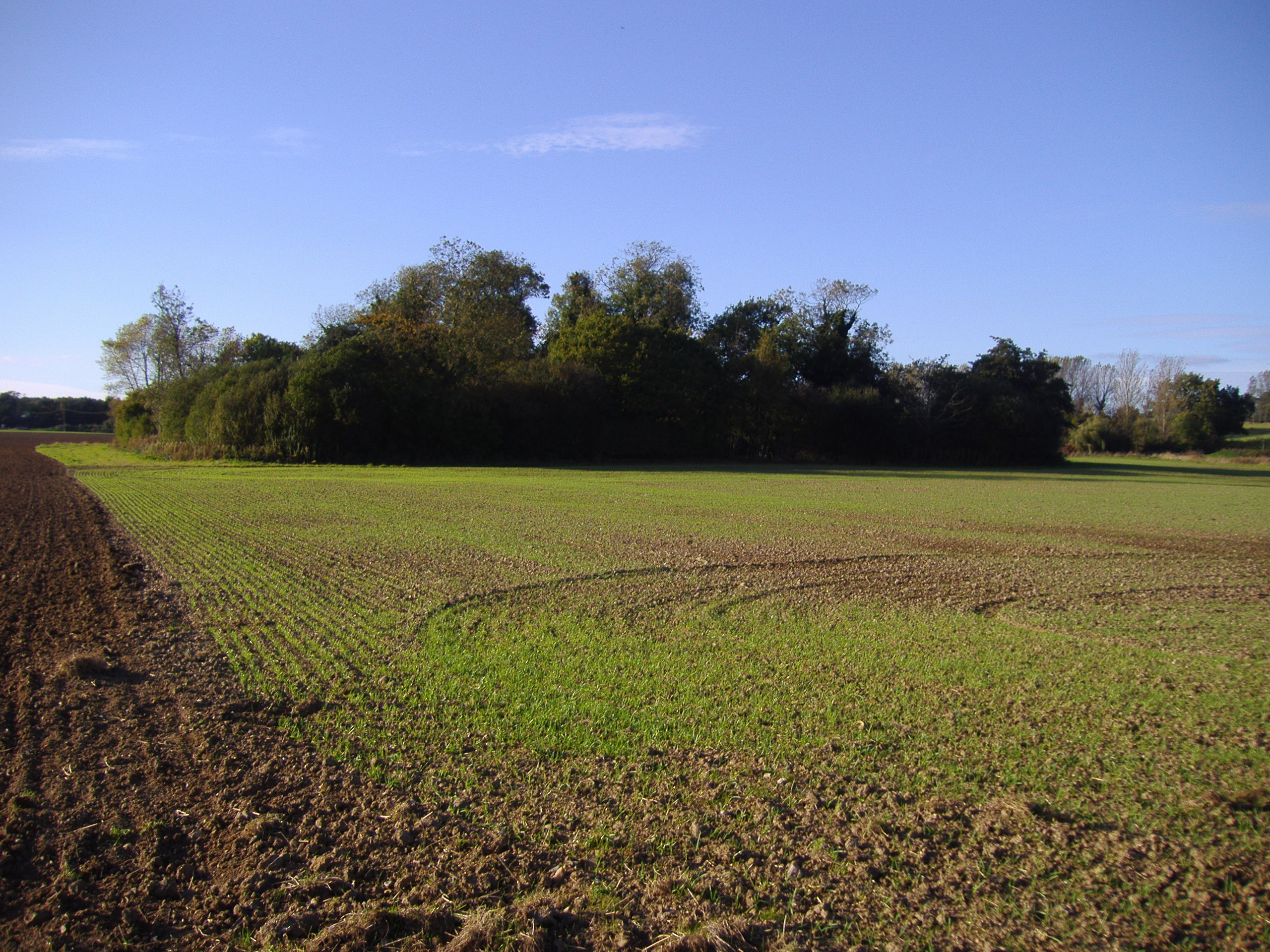
The overgrown site of Gresham Castle

...Partridge and his fellowship arn sore afeared that ye would entren again upon them, and they have made great ordinance within the house, as it is told me. They have made bars to bar the doors cross-ways, and they han made wickets on every quarter of the house to shoot out at, both with bows and with hand guns.

One year later John Paston reclaimed the castle and manor, this time with no resistance. He found that the castle was in a very poor state and unfit for habitation. In 1466 John Paston died leaving his estate which included Gresham to his eldest son, also called John. In 1471 Sir John Gresham contemplated the rebuilding of Gresham Castle and sent his brother, also called John, to survey the site and draw up plans for a rebuilding. In the event no rebuilding was carried out and the site was abandoned.

== Description ==
The castle is situated in a green field site close to the village. It is rectangular in shape with a bulbous protrusion at the north-west corner. A moat surrounding the site is 12–15 feet (3.7–4.6 m) wide and still contains water which can restrict access to the site. The waters of the moat were once supplied from Gur Beck, however this has been re-directed and runs approximately 160 feet (49 m) from the remains of the castle. The central platform is approximately 2,844 square yards (2,378 m^{2}) in area, with round towers 35 feet (11 m) in diameter. It is very overgrown with trees, bushes and brambles, making an overview of the castle very difficult. The tower that stood at the south-east angle is forward of the platform line. The revetments of the two corner towers on the west elevation can be seen, of which one is much larger than the other. Between them part of the curtain wall still stands to about six feet. The footprint of the site indicates that there were towers on the east side as well, with the one at the north west angle being the size of a keep. Large timbers, presumed to be what remained of a drawbridge, an entrance to a passage, and the keel of a boat were discovered when the surrounding moat was cleaned out in 1846.

== See also ==
- Castles in Great Britain and Ireland
- List of castles in England
