= Aylmerton =

Village in Norfolk, England

Coordinates: 52.91°N 1.24°E

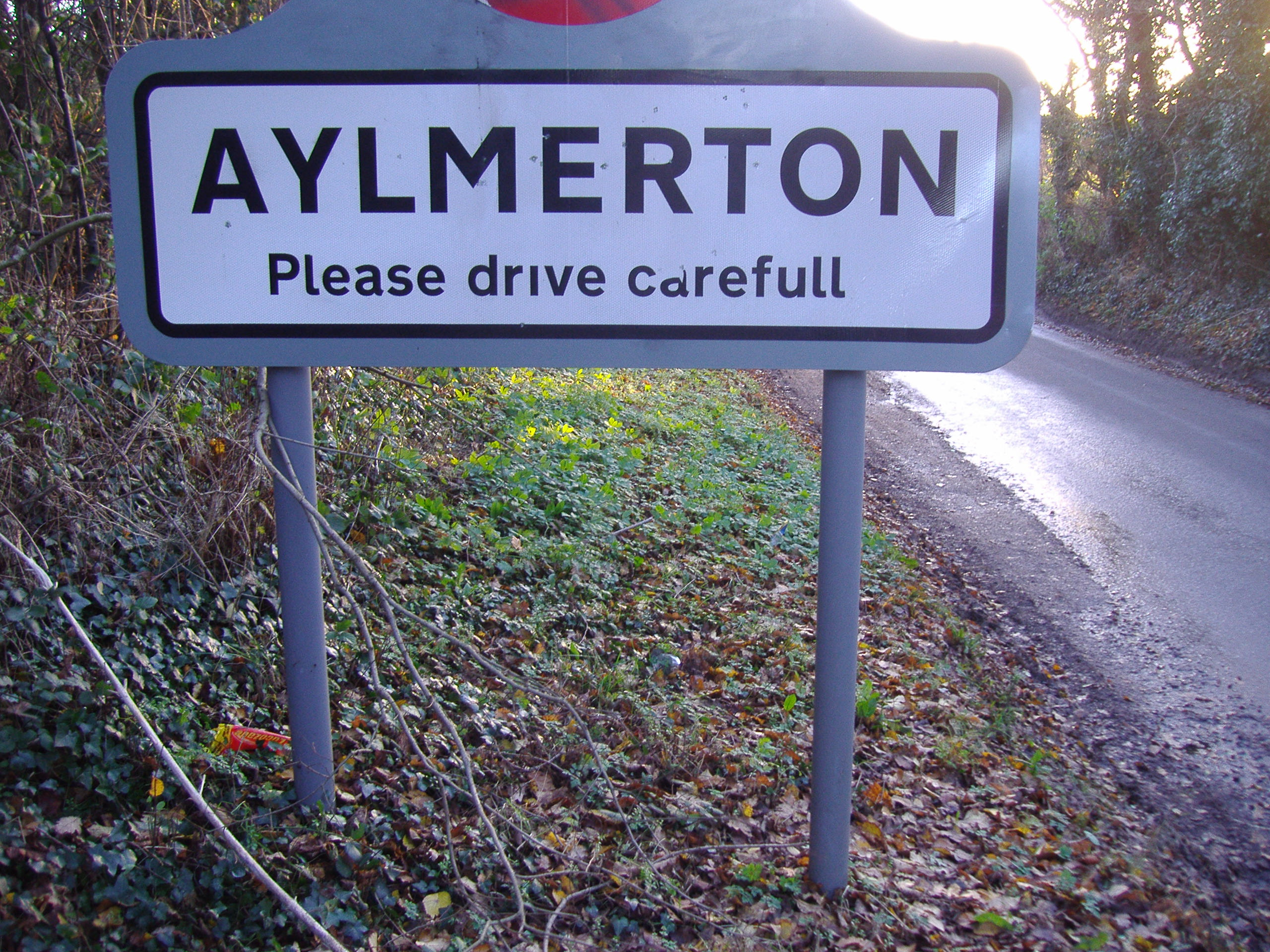
- Village road sign

- Location within Norfolk
- Area: 6.86 km^{2} (2.65 sq mi)
- Population: 458 (parish, 2011 census)
  - Density: 67/km^{2} (170/sq mi)
- OS grid reference: TG2040
  - London: 137 miles (220 km)
- Civil parish: Aylmerton
- District: North Norfolk
- Shire county: Norfolk
- Region: East
- Country: England
- Sovereign state: United Kingdom
- Post town: Norwich
- Postcode district: NR11
- Dialling code: 01263
- Police: Norfolk
- Fire: Norfolk
- Ambulance: East of England
- UK Parliament: North Norfolk

Aylmerton (/ˈɛlmərˌtən/) is a village in the county of Norfolk, England. It is in the area of North Norfolk and lies 2.2 miles (3.5 km) south of the North Sea, 3.2 miles (5.1 km) south-west of Cromer and 7.5 miles (12.1 km) east of Holt. The parish is bordered by the parishes of Beeston Regis and Runton to the north, West Beckham to the west, Felbrigg to the east and Gresham and Sustead to the south. The centre of the village is ¾ miles south of the A148 King's Lynn to Cromer road with Sandy Lane and Beechwood Avenue north of it. The nearest railway stations are West Runton at the bottom of Sandy Lane, Cromer at 2.9 miles (4.7 km) and Roughton Road at 4.1 miles (6.6 km). The civil parish has an area of 6.86 square kilometres and in the 2001 census the population was 435 in 178 households, increasing to 458 at the 2011 Census. For the purposes of local government, the parish is in North Norfolk, whose headquarters are in Cromer.

== History ==
The village name derives from 'Aethelmaer's farm/settlement'. Aylmerton has an entry in the Domesday Book of 1085. In the great book Aylmerton is recorded by the names Almartune, and Almertune, the main land holder being William de Warren and the main tenant Roger Bigot. The survey also states that there is ½ a church. In the Domesday survey fractions were used to indicate that the entry, in this case a church, was on an estate that lay within more than one parish.

== Parish church ==
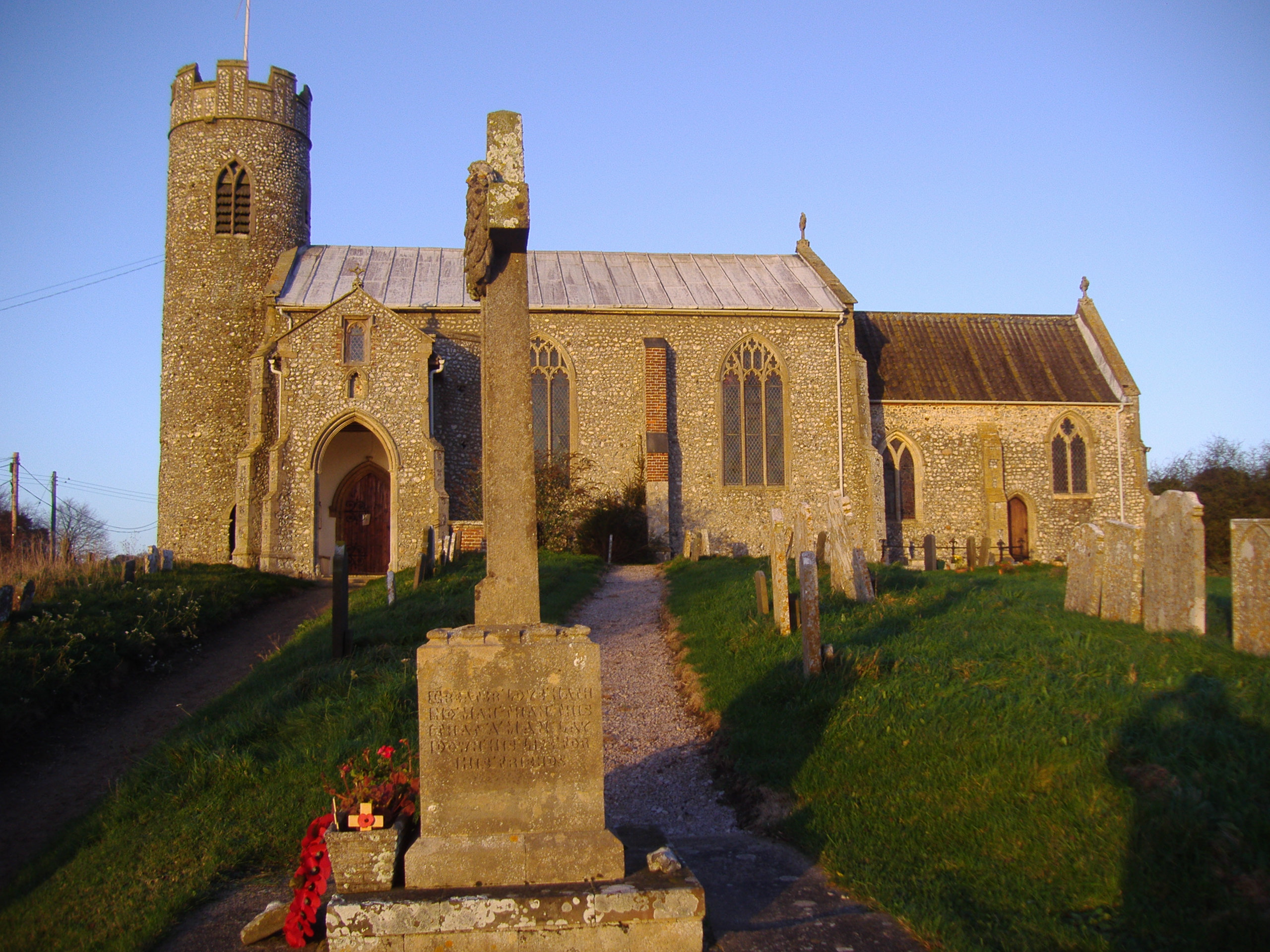
Aylmerton Parish Church

The parish church is called St John the Baptist and is a 15th-century building. It has a round flint tower, thought to be over 700 years old. The church stands above the village on the side of a small hillside. The priest's room, which is over the porch, can be entered via the original ironbound door in the nave. The chancel windows date from the middle of the 14th century, and there are some beautiful carvings, a traceried screen dating 1500 and four elaborate bench ends with poppy heads which were carved over 400 years ago. There are the remains of a transept on the north side of the church, reduced when the nave was rebuilt.

== Stone cross ==
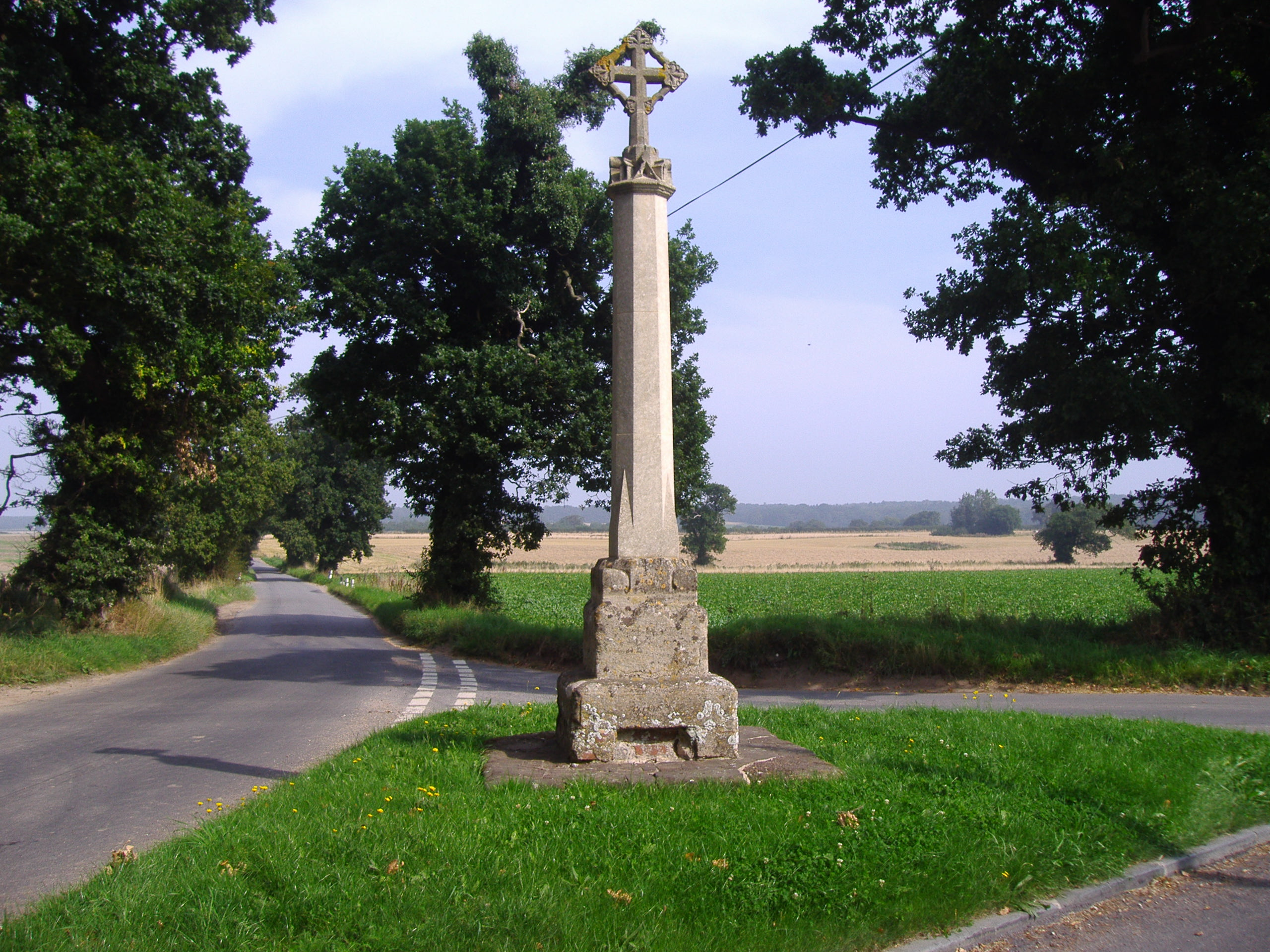
Aylmerton Stone Cross

One mile south of the village on Church Road, at a small junction of the Lower Gresham to Metton lane, is an ancient cross which has been restored. Aylmerton wayside cross (TG181388) is on the parish boundary with Gresham, and was said to be a guide to Walsingham. Three roads meet here, and a rough track heading westwards is said to have been part of the pilgrims' way heading to the holy shrines to be found there. In the fields near the cross are many shallow pits. These known locally as the 'Shrieking Pits', because of their reputation for being haunted by the ghost of a Stone Age woman.
