= East Beckham =

Village in Norfolk, England

Coordinates: 52.9123°N 1.2133°E

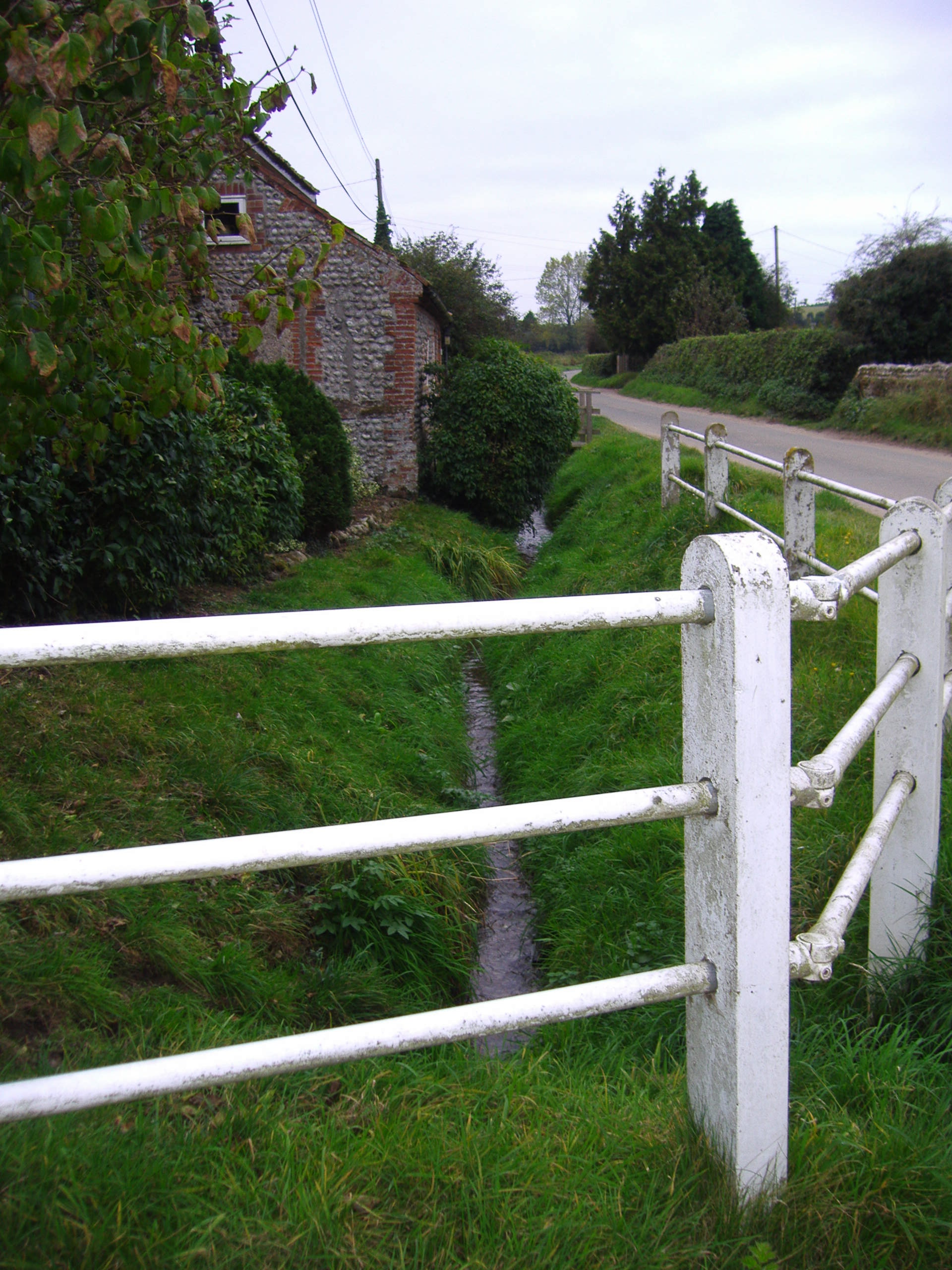
- Gur Beck in East Beckham

- Location within Norfolk
- Area: 1.17 sq mi (3.0 km^{2})
- Population: 35 (2001 census)
  - Density: 30/sq mi (12/km^{2})
- OS grid reference: TG160390
  - London: 137 miles (220 km)
- District: North Norfolk
- Shire county: Norfolk
- Region: East
- Country: England
- Sovereign state: United Kingdom
- Post town: Norwich
- Postcode district: NR11
- Dialling code: 01263
- Police: Norfolk
- Fire: Norfolk
- Ambulance: East of England
- UK Parliament: North Norfolk

East Beckham is a village and a civil parish in the English county of Norfolk.

East Beckham is 5 miles (8.0 km) south-west of Cromer and 23.4 miles (37.7 km) north of Norwich.

== History ==
East Beckham's name is of Anglo-Saxon origin and derives from the Old English for Becca's village.

In the Domesday Book, East Beckham is listed as a settlement of 31 households in the hundred of North Erpingham. In 1086, the village was divided between the East Anglian estates of King William I, Roger Bigod and William de Beaufeu.

St. Helen's Church, East Beckham was built in the Fourteenth Century but was derelict by 1602 and finally demolished in the 1890s. Today, the stone foundations are still visible despite much of the masonry of the church being used to make additions to St. Helen's Church in West Beckham.

In the Fifteenth Century, the Lord of the Manor of East Beckham was James Gresham, the grandfather of Sir John Gresham.

== Geography ==
Due to the small population of East Beckham, its population statistics are amalgamated with nearby West Beckham.

Part of the A148, between King's Lynn and Cromer, runs through the parish.

The nearest railway station is in the town of Sheringham, where access to the national rail network can be made via the Bittern Line to Norwich. The nearest airport is Norwich International Airport.

== Governance ==
East Beckham is part of the electoral ward of Gresham for local elections and is part of the district of North Norfolk.

The village's national constituency is North Norfolk, which has been represented by the Liberal Democrat Steff Aquarone MP since 2024.

== War Memorial ==
East Beckham's war memorial is shared with that of West Beckham and is located in St. Helen's Churchyard. The memorial is carved stone slab that shows significant signs of weathering. The memorial lists the following name for the First World War:

Rank	Name	Unit	Date of death	Burial/Commemoration
Pte.	Robert L. Larwood	9th Bn., Bedfordshire Regiment	26 Apr. 1916	Fort Pitt Military Cemetery
