= Edward Gresham =

Member of Parliament for Bletchingley
- In office 1701–1702 Serving with John Ward

Personal details
- Born: 30 January 1649
- Died: 14 April 1709 (aged 60)
- Relations: Gresham baronets

Sir Edward Gresham, 2nd Baronet (30 January 1649 – 14 April 1709) was an English politician. He served as a Member of Parliament (MP). He inherited Titsey Place from his father Thomas Gresham.

== See also ==
- 6th Parliament of William III
