= West Beckham =

Village in Norfolk, England

Coordinates: 52.91°N 1.17°E

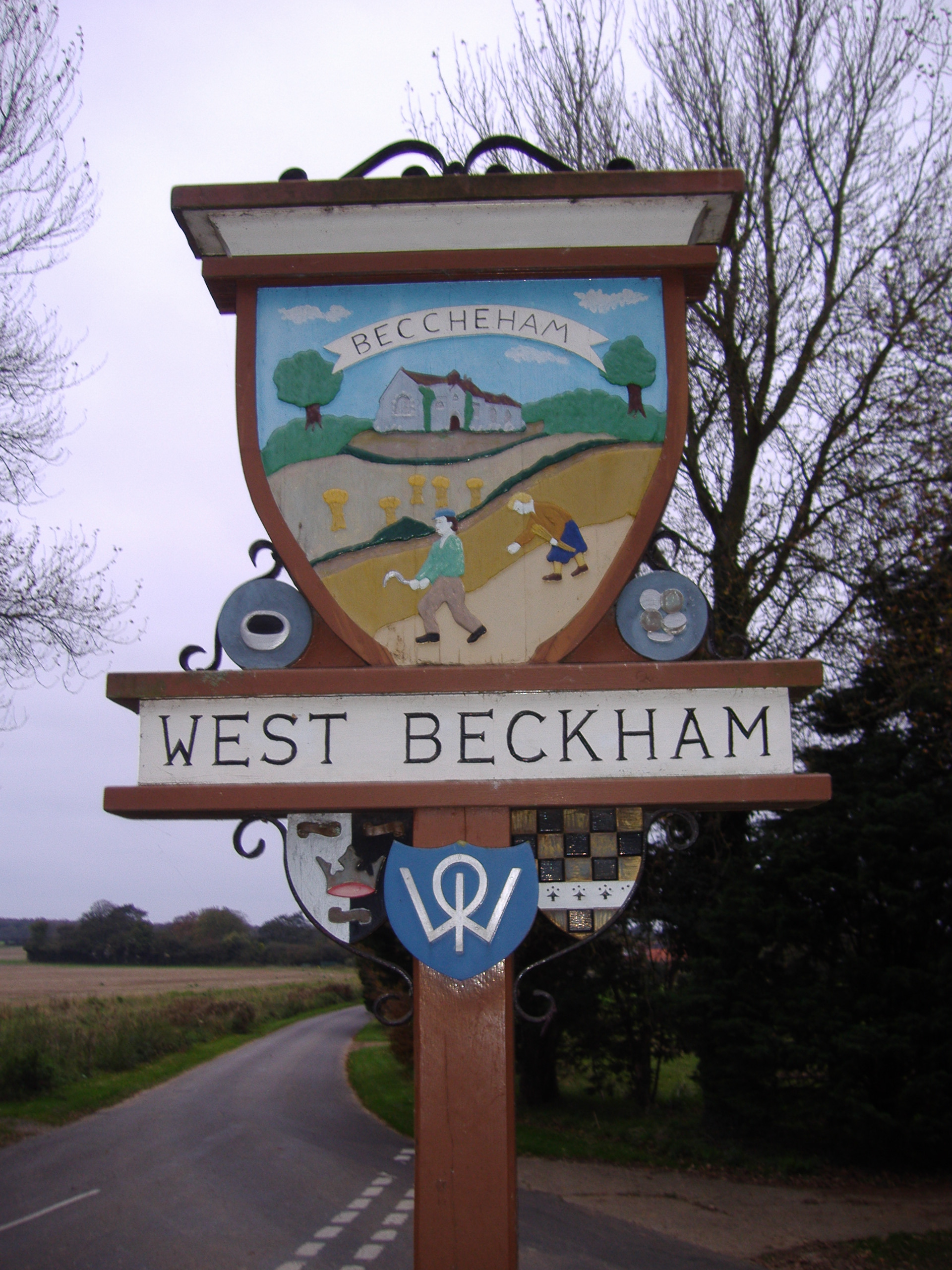
- The Village sign

- Location within Norfolk
- Area: 3.11 km^{2} (1.20 sq mi)
- Population: 289 (2011 census)
  - Density: 93/km^{2} (240/sq mi)
- OS grid reference: TG130390
  - London: 131 miles (211 km)
- Civil parish: West Beckham
- District: North Norfolk
- Shire county: Norfolk
- Region: East
- Country: England
- Sovereign state: United Kingdom
- Post town: Holt
- Postcode district: NR25
- Dialling code: 01263
- Police: Norfolk
- Fire: Norfolk
- Ambulance: East of England
- UK Parliament: North Norfolk

West Beckham is a village and a civil parish in the English county of Norfolk The village is 6.1 miles (9.8 km) west south west of Cromer, 25.3 miles (40.7 km) north north west of Norwich and 131 miles (211 km) north north east of London. The village lies 4.1 miles (6.6 km) east of the town of Holt. The village is 2.4 miles (3.9 km) inland from the North Norfolk Coast to the north. The village is 0.8 miles to the south of the A148 King's Lynn to Cromer road. The nearest railway station is at Sheringham for the Bittern Line which runs between Sheringham, Cromer and Norwich. The nearest airport is Norwich International Airport.

== History ==
The villages name means 'Becca's homestead/village' or 'Becca's hemmed-in land'. 'West' to distinguish from East Beckham.

West Beckham has an entry in the Domesday Book of 1085. In the great book West Beckham is recorded by the name "Becham". The main tenant is Walter Giffard.

== The Parish Church of St Helen and all saint's ==
The Parish Church of St Helen and All Saint's was built during the second half of the 19th century to replace a medieval church. The church's construction is unusual in that it is not only shingled on the outside, it is shingled on the inside as well. The shingle of the interior walls are banded with red brick in the Puginesque style. On the upper banding of brickwork there is fading evangelical text. Much of the building material was re-cycled from the remains of two early churches - the Church of St Helen in East Beckham, and All Saints Church in West Beckham. At the western end of the church there is a clear rose window. Below the window can be found the font reminiscent of a wedding cake.

== Village amenities ==
The one village pub is called The Wheatsheaf and was formerly the 'Old Manor Farmhouse', a historic building, which was converted into the pub in 1983. The pub serves a wide range of food and real ale. It also has monthly quizzes and occasional karaoke nights, in aid of charity. In the summer months entertainment is often in the garden.

=== Bodham and Beckham Village Hall ===
Bodham and Beckham Village Hall was built in the late 1980's, and is fully heated. It is regularly used by church events and a film club. Regular quiz night fundraisers are held during the winter months.
