= Aldborough, Norfolk =

Village in Norfolk, England

Coordinates: 52.862°N 1.242°E

Aldborough
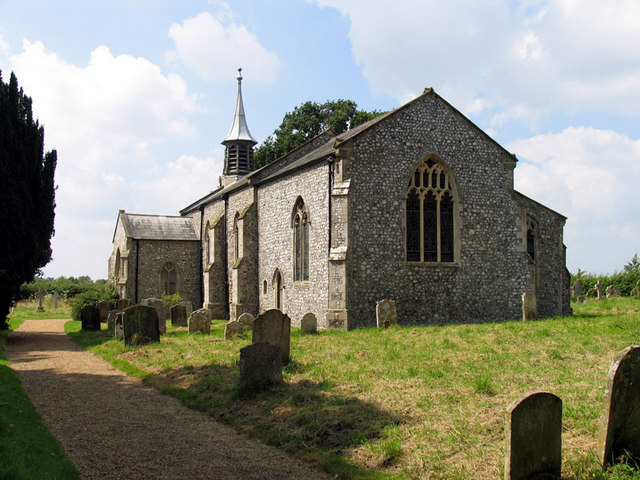
- Saint Mary Parish Church

- Location within Norfolk
- OS grid reference: TG183343
  - London: 133 miles
- Civil parish: Aldborough and Thurgarton
- District: North Norfolk
- Shire county: Norfolk
- Region: East
- Country: England
- Sovereign state: United Kingdom
- Post town: NORWICH
- Postcode district: NR11
- Dialling code: 01263
- Police: Norfolk
- Fire: Norfolk
- Ambulance: East of England
- UK Parliament: North Norfolk

Aldborough is a village and former civil parish in the North Norfolk district of the English county of Norfolk. It is situated about 8 miles (13 km) south of Cromer. The parish was combined with Thurgarton in April 1935 and the two villages are now both in the parish of Aldborough and Thurgarton. On 1 January 2001, the new parish was renamed to "Aldborough & Thurgarton". The combined parish had a population of 567 in 259 households at the 2001 Census, increasing to 578 at the 2011 Census.

The name "Aldborough" derives from the Old English ald (old) and burh (fortification). At the 1931 census the former civil parish of had a population of 302.
