= Gresham, Norfolk =

Village in Norfolk, England

Coordinates: 52.90025°N 1.22135°E

Gresham
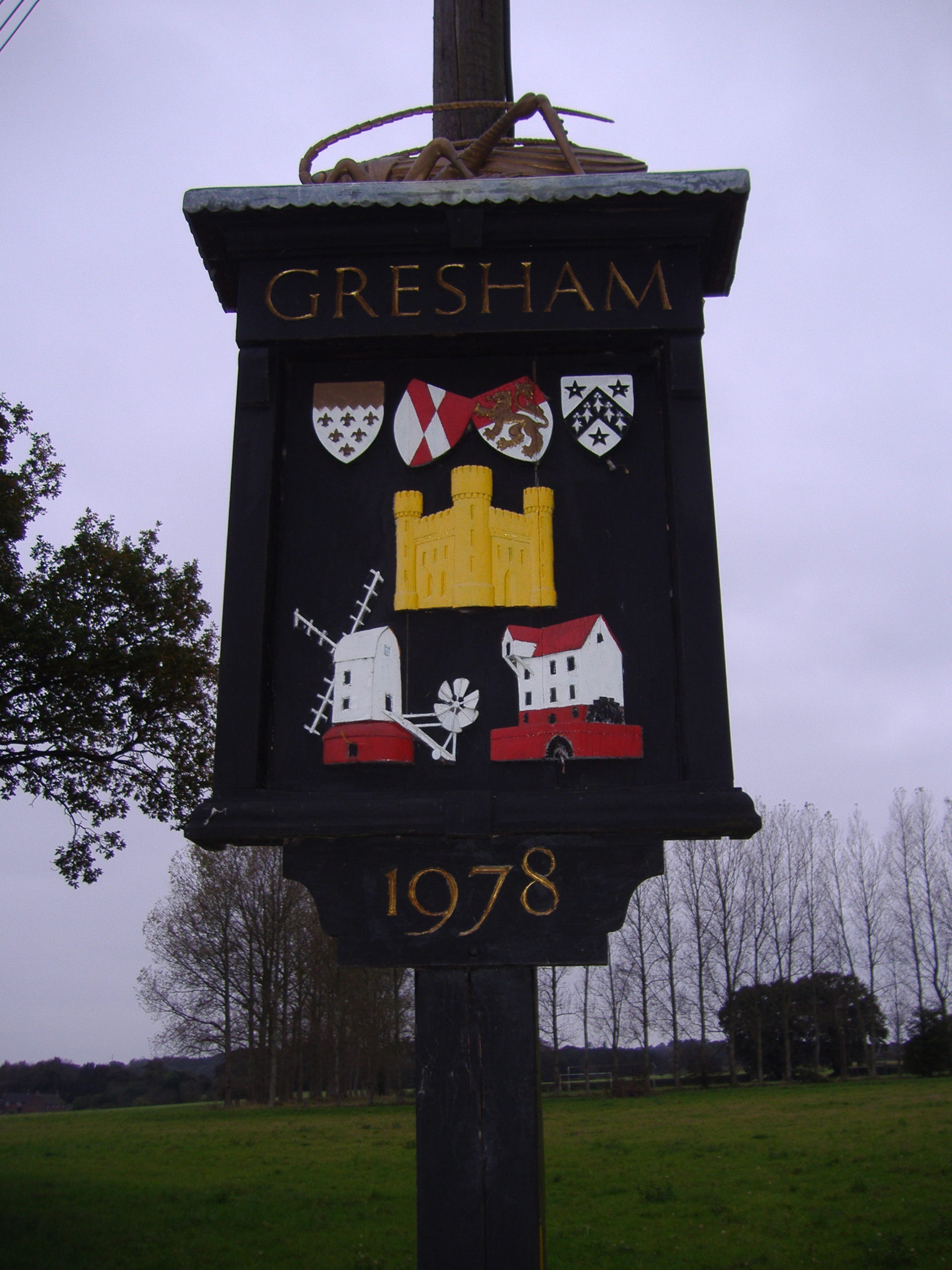
- The Gresham village sign, dated 1978, surmounted by the grasshopper which is the crest of the Gresham family

- Location within Norfolk
- Area: 8.69 km^{2} (3.36 sq mi)
- Population: 401 (Including East Beckham. 2011 census)
  - Density: 46/km^{2} (120/sq mi)
- OS grid reference: TG167385
- District: North Norfolk
- Shire county: Norfolk
- Region: East
- Country: England
- Sovereign state: United Kingdom
- Post town: NORWICH
- Postcode district: NR11
- Dialling code: 01263
- Police: Norfolk
- Fire: Norfolk
- Ambulance: East of England
- UK Parliament: North Norfolk

Gresham is a village and civil parish in North Norfolk, England, five miles (8 km) south-west of Cromer.

A predominantly rural parish, Gresham centres on its medieval church of All Saints. The village also once had a square 14th-century castle, a watermill and a windmill. The moat and some ruins of Gresham Castle survive.

== History ==
The name of Gresham is derived from a local stream known as the Gur Beck, plus -ham, meaning a settlement.

In the Domesday Book of 1086, Gresham is recorded as one of the holdings of William de Warenne, 1st Earl of Surrey.

Sir Edmund Bacon of Baconsthorpe held the manor. After his death in 1336 or 1337, there was much fighting over his property, which included the manor of Gresham. A William Moleyns married Bacon's daughter Margery and tried unsuccessfully to deprive John Burghersh, the son of Bacon's other daughter and heiress Margaret, of his inheritance. A partition of Bacon's property was made between his heirs in the 35th year of King Edward III, and when the division between Moleyns and Burghersh was complete, Gresham went to Margery, who died in 1399. She granted Gresham to Sir Philip Vache for nine years after her death, but in 1414 his widow still held it and Sir William Moleyns agreed to buy it from Margery's executors for 920 marks. He held it for two years, but did not complete the payment. The manor then fell into a complicated contract for the future marriage of Moleyns's daughter Katherine which did not take place, and Thomas Chaucer (c. 1367–1434), Speaker of the House of Commons, and the son of the poet Geoffrey Chaucer, acquired the manor of Gresham and sold it to William Paston. (Thomas Chaucer was married to a granddaughter of Maud Bacon, almost certainly another daughter of Edmund Bacon.) However, Robert Hungerford, Lord Moleyns, then claimed it and seized it by force.

Margaret Paston, in one of the Paston Letters, writing to her husband John Paston in a letter dated 19 May 1448, says:

The Lord Moleyns man gathereth up the rent at Gresham a great pace, and James Gresham shall tell you more plainly thereof at his coming.

The James Gresham here referred to is James Gresham, gentleman, of Holt, who appears often in the Paston Letters as a confidential agent.

Eight months later, when Paston's attempts to recover the manor through negotiation and legal action had failed, he sent his wife to occupy "a mansion" in the parish. In response, Moleyns sent an armed force which the Pastons claimed amounted to a thousand men, attacked the house, which was badly damaged, and expelled Margaret Paston.

Writing to her husband in a letter dated 28 September, Margaret Paston says:

It was done me to wete that dyverys of the Lord Moleynis men seydin if thei myt gete me thei shuld stele me and kepe me wyth-inne the kastell... I pray you send me word be the brynger of this how ye wil that I be demenyd. I wol ben ryght sory to dwel so nere Gressam as I dede tyl the mater were fully determynyd be-twix the lord Moleynis and you.

Moleyns was able to hold onto possession of Gresham for three years.

In 1620, the manor was sold to the Batt family, in which it has remained ever since. The present lord of the manor is Robert Batt.

A curious case of 1786 in the Court of King's Bench called The King against the Inhabitants of Gresham was to do with the master-servant relationship in the case of William Thompson, a settled inhabitant of Gresham until 1780, who had entered the service of a Mr Creemer of Beeston Regis and later became a pauper.

The Imperial Gazetteer of England and Wales (1870–1872) described Gresham:

GRESHAM, a parish in Erpingham district, Norfolk; 5 miles SW of Cromer, and 9½ NW of North Walsham r. station. Post town, Cromer, under Norwich. Acres, 1,303. Real property, £1,797. Pop., 345. Houses, 84. The property is divided among a few. The Gresham family, of whom was Sir Thomas Gresham, are supposed to have had their name from this parish; and the poet Chaucer had property here. Remains exist of an embattled mansion which belonged, in the time of Edward II., to the Bacons. Lime is worked. The living is a rectory in the diocese of Norwich. Value, £321. Patron, the Rev. Mr. Spurgin. The church is decorated English, in good condition; has a round tower; and contains a curiously sculptured font.

The records of the Aylmerton and Gresham School from 1874 to 1991 are held in the Norfolk Record Office.

== Governance ==
An electoral ward in the same name exists. This ward had a population of 8,584 at the 2011 Census.

== Church ==
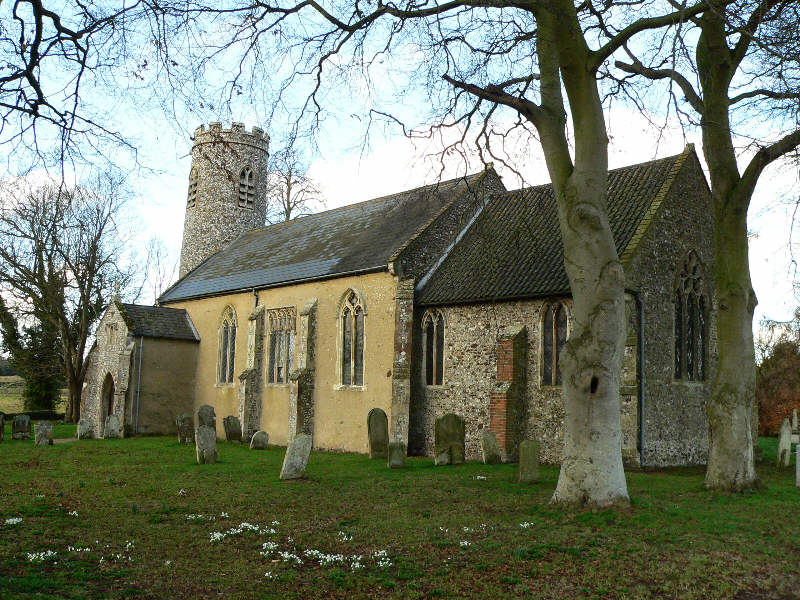
All Saints' church, Gresham

The parish church of All Saints is one of 124 round-tower churches in Norfolk.

The church contains one of the East Anglian seven sacrament fonts, in which there is much interest. Scenes represented on it include a baptism, a holy eucharist, and parishioners clustering around a neighbour's deathbed.

The church was built on a pagan site, and in 1910 the Prehistoric Society of East Anglia was shown an ancient polished axe which had been dug up in the churchyard and a chipped celt which had been built into the church tower. Walter Johnson, in Byways in British Archaeology, comments that "Its presence there was probably accidental, but it is well to recall the Breton practice of building stone axes into chimneys to ward off lightning".

In 1940, the executors of Joseph Cox of Gresham presented Norwich Castle Museum with a prehistoric handled beaker of the Bronze Age which had been found near Gresham.

Gresham was the site of a famous clerical battle in the 1940s. Although it was then seen as an Anglo-Catholic parish, the inside walls of the church are now bare and whitewashed, due to the efforts of the squire of the day, Colonel Batt, who was a determined Protestant, while his parish priest was an Anglo-Catholic. The Colonel demanded that all high church decorations be removed, the clergyman refused, and Batt took the matter to a consistory court and won. The case became famous, but it was one of the last of its kind.

The parish registers for the years 1559 to 1969 are held in the Norfolk Record Office at Norwich.

For centuries, the church had its own rector, but it now shares a clergyman, who lives at West Runton, with neighbouring villages. It is still used for religious services, with Morning Prayer at 11 a.m. on the first and third Sundays of each month and Holy Communion (Order 1, Traditional) at the same time on every second and fourth Sunday.

== Parish ==
Much of the parish of Gresham belongs to Robert Batt, lord of the manor of eighteen villages. The estate at Gresham has been in his family since 1620.

The village is also the ancestral home of the famous Norfolk family of Gresham, whose members included Sir John Gresham, founder of Gresham's School, and Sir Thomas Gresham, founder of Gresham College and the Royal Exchange. The Gresham family moved to Holt in the 15th century. According to Francis Blomefield in An essay towards a topographical history of the county of Norfolk (1808), James Gresham, the grandfather of Sir John Gresham, was "the son of John Gresham, Gent., of Gresham".

== Gresham Castle ==
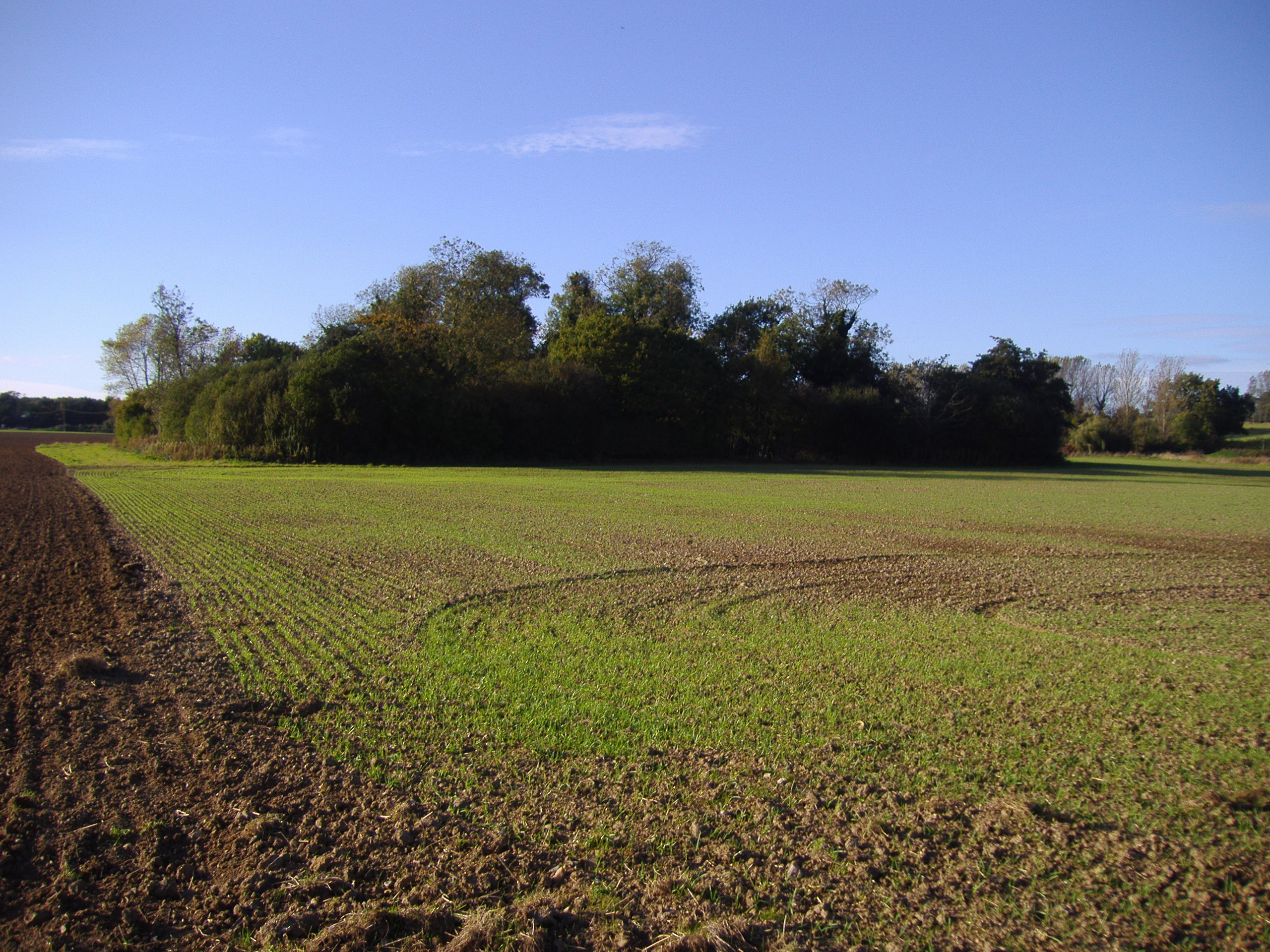
Copse containing the remains of Gresham Castle

The remains of a fortified house called Gresham Castle are near the village, opposite the Chequers Pub. It is thought to have been similar to the neighbouring Baconsthorpe Castle, and both were moated.

The castle was built by Sir Edmund Bacon after 1319, but it stood on the site of an earlier castle. The Paston family acquired it in the 15th century, and later it was looted. Little of the castle remains above ground, and much of the site is overgrown. Bacon's castle was about forty metres square, with round towers at the four corners and a moat. The moat survives, is twelve to fifteen feet wide, and still contains water. The central platform is about 2,378 square metres in area, while the round towers were about eleven metres in diameter.

== Mills ==
Gresham had a small watermill, sold by the incumbent of Plumstead and Matlaske to Capt. R.C. Batt, 1908, on a site later known as Old Watermill Farm, in Lower Gresham. In 1819 the mill was grinding flour from wheat with two pairs of French burr stones. By 1977, nothing remained of this mill except the water channel and some foundations.

There was also a windmill in the parish, which stood on one of the highest points in the county of Norfolk, and it was reported in 1864 that "from it may be distinctly seen 36 churches and objects at a distance off 25 miles."

In 1828, the two mills were advertised together:

GRESHAM, Norfolk To be SOLD or LET With Possession at Michaelmas next A Good Dwelling House at Gresham in Norfolk in thorough repair with stable, hay house, a new barn & other convenient outbuildings & a Water Mill adjoining the House, together with about 10 Acres of Arable & Pasture Land, all Freehold. Also a very substantial Post Windmill near the above premises & about 3 acres of Land on part of which the Windmill stands. The Land is held under a Lease for a term of which about 13 years will be unexpired at Michaelmas next. Apply to Mr. John Cadge the proprietor or to Messrs. Sewell, Blake, Keith & Blake, Solrs. Norwich.

== War Memorial ==
Gresham War Memorial is a stone obelisk which a stepped plinth in All Saints' Churchyard. The memorial lists the following names for the First World War:

Rank	Name	Unit	Date of death	Burial/Commemoration
LSgt.	Ernest W. Painter	1st Bn., Norfolk Regiment	30 Apr. 1915	Perth Cemetery
ASn.	George Woodhouse	HMS Laurel	28 Aug. 1914	Chatham Naval Memorial
Dvr.	Wallace Loades	Royal Horse Artillery	22 Dec. 1918	All Saints' Churchyard
OSn.	Leonard Stageman	SS Borg	10 Jun. 1918	Plymouth Naval Memorial
Pte.	William Williamson	1st Bn., Essex Regiment	13 Aug. 1915	Helles Memorial
Pte.	Frank W. Ramm	2nd Bn., Norfolk Regiment	22 Nov. 1915	Basra Memorial
Pte.	Daniel Lowder	7th Bn., Norfolk Regt.	30 Nov. 1917	Bedford House Cemetery
Pte.	Thomas H. Chapman	7th Bn., Norfolk Regt.	28 Apr. 1917	Arras Memorial
Pte.	Albert H. Field	9th Bn., Norfolk Regt.	27 May 1918	Tyne Cot
Pte.	Lewis Thaxter	9th Bn., Norfolk Regt.	20 Nov. 1917	Fifteen Ravine Cemetery
Pte.	George Lark	2nd Bn., Royal Sussex Regiment	13 Nov. 1917	Tyne Cot

The following names were added after the Second World War:

Rank	Name	Unit	Date of death	Burial/Commemoration
Maj.	Edgar C. Batt (Note: Major Batt was the son of Lt-Col. Reginald Batt, the resident of Gresham Hall.)	107 Regt, Royal Horse Artillery	8 Oct. 1940	Alexandria War Cemetery
Maj.	Thomas R. D. Batt MC (Note: Major Batt was the son of Lt-Col. Reginald Batt, the resident of Gresham Hall. Major Batt was awarded the Military Cross for organising the retreat from Dunkirk in 1940 and was killed by a German sniper in 1944.)	1st Bn., Coldstream Guards	3 Aug. 1944	Saint-Charles Cemetery
Lt.	Robert W. Batt (Note: Lieutenant Batt was the son of Lt-Col. Reginald Batt, the resident of Gresham Hall.)	Royal Army Ordnance Corps	21 Aug. 1944	St Nicholas' Churchyard, Gosforth
LCpl.	James R. Lake	Royal Army Service Corps	14 Jul. 1942	Asmara War Cemetery
Gdsm.	Alfred J. Craske	1st Bn., Coldstream Guards	30 May 1940	Veurne Cemetery
Pte.	Stanley J. Bumfrey	6th Bn., Royal Norfolk Regiment	19 Feb. 1942	Kranji War Memorial

== Gallery ==
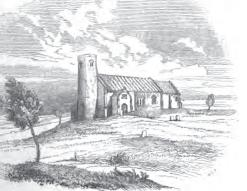
All Saints' Church, c. 1838

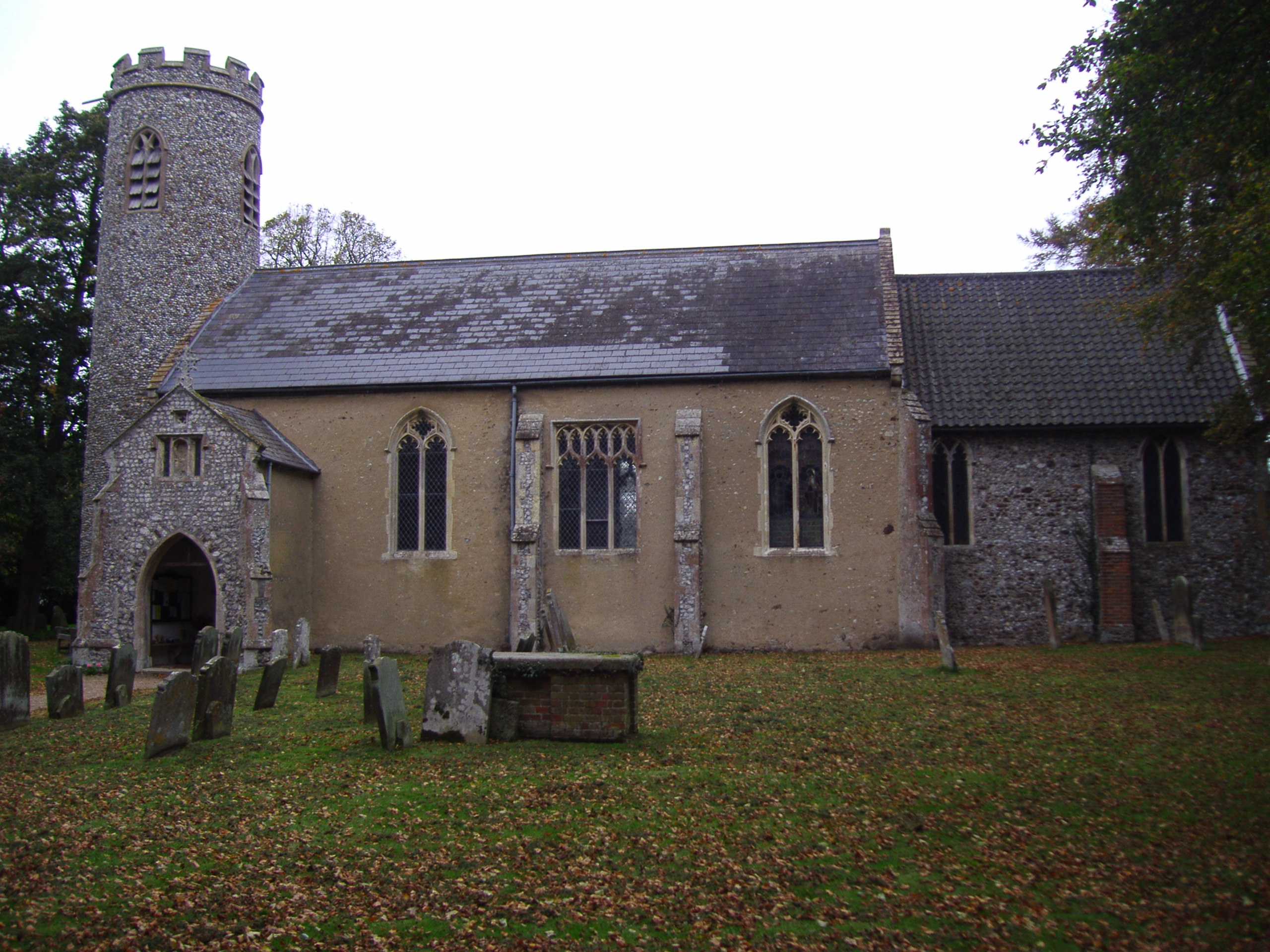
All Saints' Church

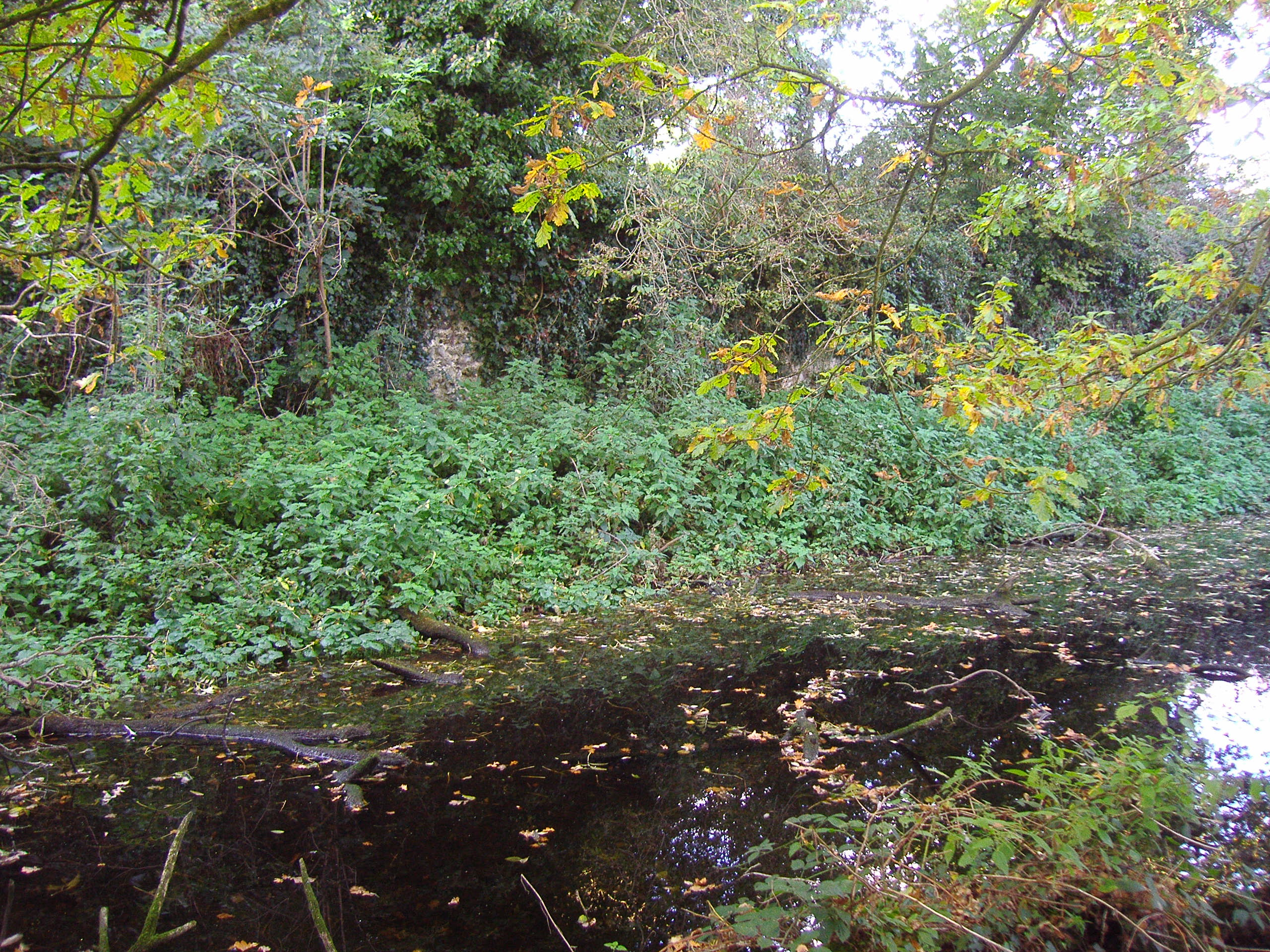
Walls of Gresham Castle
