= Felbrigg =

Village in Norfolk, England

Coordinates: 52.90919°N 1.27922°E

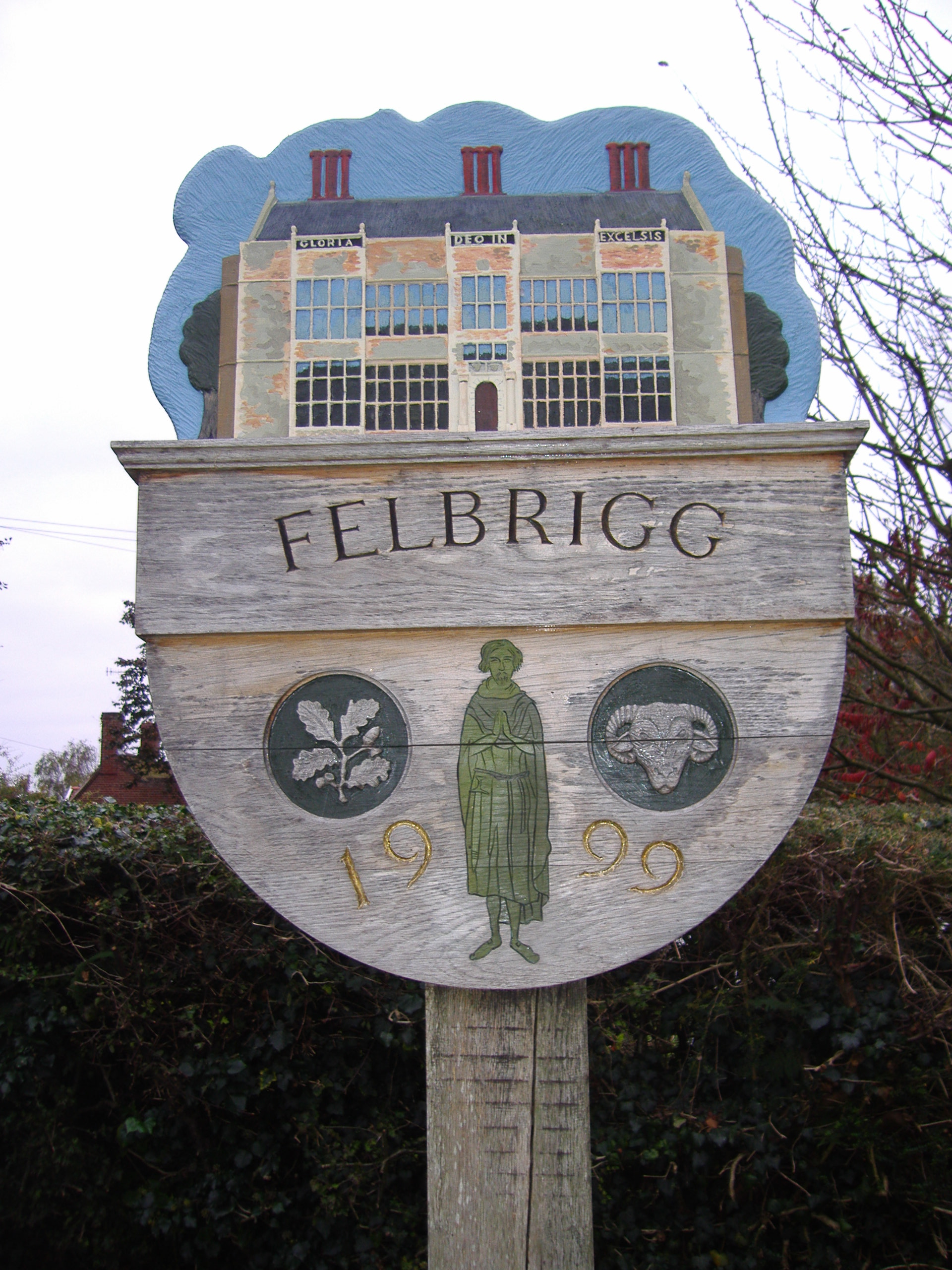
- Felbrigg village sign, showing Felbrigg Hall

- Location within Norfolk
- Area: 2.43 sq mi (6.3 km^{2})
- Population: 201 (2021)
  - Density: 83/sq mi (32/km^{2})
- OS grid reference: TG2040
  - London: 136 miles (219 km)
- Civil parish: Felbrigg
- District: North Norfolk
- Shire county: Norfolk
- Region: East
- Country: England
- Sovereign state: United Kingdom
- Post town: NORWICH
- Postcode district: NR11
- Dialling code: 01263
- Police: Norfolk
- Fire: Norfolk
- Ambulance: East of England
- UK Parliament: North Norfolk

Felbrigg is a village and civil parish in the English county of Norfolk.

Felbrigg is located 1.7 miles (2.7 km) south-west of Cromer and 20 miles (32 km) north of Norwich.

== History ==
Felbrigg's name is of Viking origin and derives from the Old Norse for a plank bridge.

Felbrigg parish has been the site of the discovery of several Roman artefacts including pottery, coins, brooches and a figurine of Priapus. Despite this, no conclusive evidence of a Roman settlement has been identified.

In the Domesday Book, Felbrigg is listed as a settlement of 6 households in the hundred of North Erpingham. In 1086, the village formed part of the East Anglian estates of Roger Bigod.

== Geography ==
According to the 2021 census Felbrigg has a population of 201 people, an increase from the 193 recorded in the 2011 census.

Felbrigg sits along the B1436 between Cromer and Thorpe Market.

Felbrigg Woods is a Site of Special Scientific Interest and is mainly within the grounds and estate of Felbrigg Hall. The woods mainly consist of common beech trees, with many rare species of lichen.

== St Margaret's Church ==
Felbrigg's parish church is dedicated to Saint Margaret of Antioch and dates from the early 15th century with extensive 19th-century restoration. St. Margaret's is located outside of the village, deep within the grounds of Felbrigg Hall, and has been Grade II listed since 1960.

St Margaret's has examples of memorials to historical owners of Felbrigg Hall, notably a carved plaque to William Windham (died 1696) by Grinling Gibbons and a carved bust of William Windham by Joseph Nollekens. The church also holds a significant collection of medieval bronzes, which has been noted as one of the best in Norfolk.

== Felbrigg Hall ==
Felbrigg Hall was built in the seventeenth century in Jacobean style by Robert Lyminge, with an interior completed in the Georgian style. The hall was later adapted by William Samwell and later James Paine. The hall was the home of the Windham and Ketton-Cremer families until the death of its last, heirless owner R. W. Ketton-Cremer, when the property passed to the ownership of the National Trust.

== Notable residents ==
- V-Adm. Thomas Wyndham (1508–1554) – Royal Navy officer, explorer and navigator
- Sir John Wyndham (1558–1645) – English landowner
- Ashe Windham (1673–1749) – English landowner and politician
- William Windham Sr. (1717–1761) – English landowner
- William Windham (1750–1810) – English politician and landowner
- Vice Admiral William Lukin (1768–1833) – Royal Navy officer and veteran of the Napoleonic Wars
- William H. Windham (1802–1854) – English politician
- Gen. Sir Charles Ash Windham (1810–1870) – British Army officer and politician
- William Frederick Windham (1840–1866) – English landowner
- R. W. Ketton-Cremer (1906–1969) – biographer and historian, resident of Felbrigg Hall.

== Governance ==
Felbrigg is part of the electoral ward of Roughton for local elections and is part of the district of North Norfolk.

The village's national constituency is North Norfolk, which has been represented by the Liberal Democrat Steff Aquarone MP since 2024.

== War Memorial ==
Felbrigg War Memorial is a Latin Cross atop a square plinth with the inscription: '1914-1918.' The memorial lists the following names for the First World War:

Rank	Name	Unit	Date of death	Burial/Commemoration
LCpl	James Thurston CdG	1st Bn, Border Regiment	1 Oct. 1918	Tyne Cot
LCpl	Ernest A. Lambert	9th Bn, Norfolk Regiment	15 Sep. 1916	Guillemont Road Cemetery
P1C	Robert W. Cawston	No. 1 Depot, Royal Air Force	15 Nov. 1918	Souvenir Cemetery
Pte	Hugh A. Snowie	5th Bn, Cameron Highlanders	23 Jul. 1918	Ploegsteert Memorial
Pte	Charles F. Lawrence	1st Bn, Royal Munster Fusiliers	28 May 1915	Helles Memorial
Pte	Harry Durant	1st Bn, Norfolk Regiment	26 Oct. 1917	Tyne Cot
Pte	James D. Kettle	2nd Bn, Norfolk Regt	22 Apr. 1916	Basra Memorial
Pte	Harry Ward	1/5th Bn, Norfolk Regt	19 Apr. 1917	Jerusalem Memorial
Pte	George H. Lawrence	7th Bn, Norfolk Regt	27 Mar. 1918	Serre Road Cemetery
Pte	John R. Grimes	9th Bn, Norfolk Regt	7 Oct. 1915	Menin Gate
Pte	Charles Kettle	9th Bn, Norfolk Regt	15 Sep. 1916	Thiepval Memorial
Pte	William Lambert	27th Bn, Northumberland Fusiliers	20 Apr. 1918	Ploegsteert Memorial

Furthermore, there is a memorial to the following soldier who was killed during the Battle of Crete during the Second World War in St Margaret's Church:

Rank	Name	Unit	Date of death	Burial/Commemoration
FO	Richard T. W. Ketton-Cremer	No. 30 Squadron RAF	31 May 1941	Alamein Memorial
