= William Windham (disambiguation) =

William Windham may refer to:

- William Windham (of Earsham, senior) (died 1730), Member of Parliament 1722–1730
- William Windham (of Earsham, junior) (c. 1706–1789), son of the above, Member of Parliament 1766–1768
- William Windham (rower) (1926–2021), Olympic rower
- William Windham Sr. (1717–1761), of Felbrigg, traveler and militia advocate
- William Windham (1750–1810), of Felbrigg, son of the above, Whig statesman
- William Lukin Windham (1768–1833), Royal Navy officer
- William Windham (Liberal politician) (1802–1854), son of the above, Member of Parliament 1832–1835
  - William Frederick Windham (1840–1866), heir to Felbrigg Hall in Norfolk

== See also ==
- William Wyndham (disambiguation)
- William Windom (politician) (1827–1891), American politician
- William Windom (actor) (1923–2012), American actor, great-grandson of the above
