= St Margaret's Church, Felbrigg =

St Margaret’s Church, Felbrigg
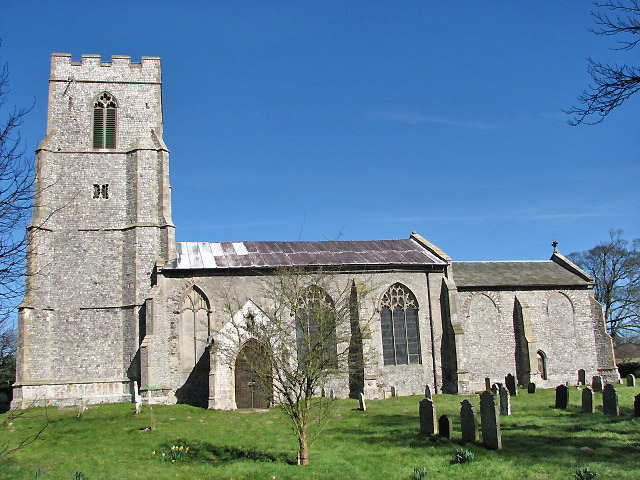
- St Margaret’s Church, Felbrigg

- Location within Norfolk
- 52°54′15″N 1°15′58″E
- OS grid reference: TG 19751 39013
- Location: Felbrigg
- Country: England
- Denomination: Church of England

History
- Dedication: Saint Margaret of Antioch

Architecture
- Heritage designation: Grade II* listed
- Designated: 4 October 1960

Administration
- Province: Canterbury
- Diocese: Norwich
- Archdeaconry: Lynn
- Deanery: Repps
- Parish: Felbrigg

St Margaret's Church is a Grade II* listed parish church in the Church of England Diocese of Norwich in Felbrigg, Norfolk.

== History ==
The church is medieval with later additions. Built of flint with stone and brick dressings. The tower dates from ca. 1410 and was built by Sir Simon de Felbrigg. Although a village was originally located around the church, in the 16th century following an outbreak of the plague the village was rebuilt in a new location to the north-east, leaving the church isolated.

== Parish status ==
The church is in a joint benefice with:

- St Mary's Church, Roughton, Norfolk
- St Andrew's Church, Metton, Norfolk
- St Peter and St Paul's Church, Sustead, Norfolk
- St Mary's Church, Bessingham, Norfolk
- St Bartholomew's Church, Hanworth, Norfolk

== Memorials ==
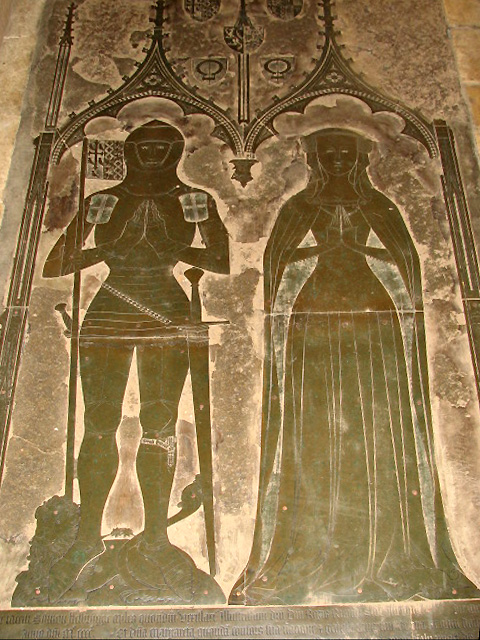
Monumental brass of Simon de Felbrigge and wife Margaret of Teschen

- Simon de Felbrigg d. 1351 and his wife Alice, daughter of Sir George de Thorpe, Kt., Lord of the Manor of Breisworth, Suffolk
- Roger de Felbrigg d. 1380 and his wife Elizabeth de Scales
- Sir Simon Felbrigg d. 1442 and his first wife Margaret d. 1416 (daughter of Przemyslaus I Noszak, Duke of Cieszyn)
- Thomas Windham d. 1599
- Jane Coningsby d. 1608
- Thomas Windham d. 1653 by Martin Morley of Norwich
- Joan Windham d. 1669
- John Windham d. 1676
- William Windham d. 1689 by Grinling Gibbons
- Ashe Windham d. 1749
- William Windham d. 1762
- William Windham d. 1810 by Joseph Nollekens 1813
- Cecilia Federica Marina Windham d. 1824
- Henry Baring d. 1848
- Vice Admiral William Windham d. 1833
- William Howe Windham d. 1854
- Lady Elizabeth Caroline Sophia Giubilei (formerly Windham, née Hervey) d. 1863 (daughter of Frederick Hervey, 1st Marquess of Bristol)
- Wyndham Cremer Ketton-Cremer d. 1933 and Emily his wife d. 1952
- Flying Officer Richard Thomas Ketton-Cremer d. 1941
- Robert Wyndham Ketton-Cremer d. 1969

== Organ ==
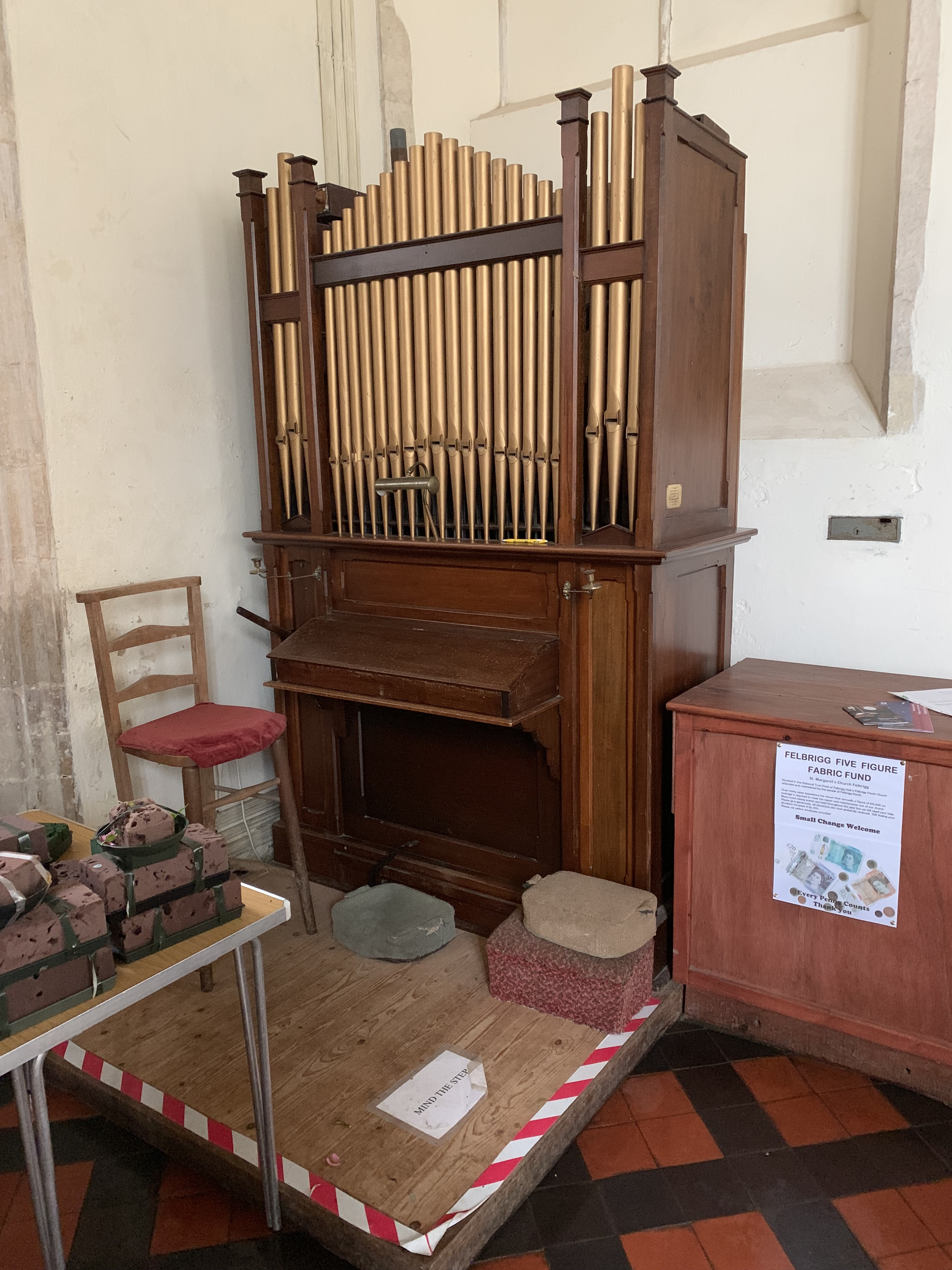
Pipe organ from St Botolph's Church, Banningham, now in Felbrigg church

The organ is thought to be by Lewis & Co and was originally in St Botolph's Church, Banningham. It was installed at Felbrigg in 1997 by Holmes & Swift. A specification of the organ can be found in the National Pipe Organ Register.
