= William Windom =

William Windom may refer to:

- William Windom (politician) (1827–1891), U.S. representative from Minnesota
- William Windom (actor) (1923–2012), his great-grandson, American actor

== See also ==
- William Windham (disambiguation)
