= Hanworth Hall =

Historic English country home

Coordinates: 52.872159°N 1.257546°E

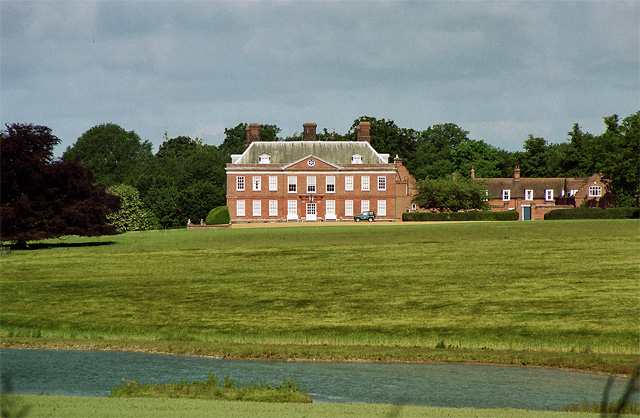
Hanworth Hall

Hanworth Hall is a large late 17th-century country house some 500 m to the south of the village of Hanworth, Norfolk, England. It is protected and recognised in the highest category of the three in the English statutory scheme, as a Grade I listed building.

It is built of brick with stone dressings and a hipped (sloped) slate roof to a double-pile floor plan. The main eastern façade has 2 storeys plus a garret-style attic; it is 9 bays across. The central three slightly project, under a simple pediment.

Hanworth Hall was seat of the Doughty family from the 15th to the 18th century. The hall was rebuilt after a fire of 1686, for Robert Doughty (1699/1700-1770). His son, Robert Lee Doughty, began to lay out the park in 1770. He valued input from friend, leading landscape designer Humphry Repton during 1789 to 1790. Within the remaining demesne grounds is a notable Spanish chestnut tree which is thought to pre-date 1714.

Robert died with no heirs and the estate passed to the children of his sister Catherine and her husband George Lukin, passing in turn to Philip Wynell Mayow (died 1845), then William Howe Windham, MP, (son of Vice Admiral William Lukin Windham) and then the latter's son William Frederick Windham. At the end of the century, his £20,000 debts in legal fees from defending himself from accusations of lunacy principally for contracting a left-handed marriage and being profligate, caused the property to be sold in 1900 to Joseph Gurney Barclay for his third son, Army officer Henry Barclay, aide-de-camp to Edward VII of the United Kingdom (1906–10) and George V (1910–25). Henry's descendant, and significant heir, Michael, was convicted and briefly gaoled in 2006 for wildlife offences.
