= Calthorpe, Norfolk =

Village in Norfolk, England

Coordinates: 52.839°N 1.236°E

Calthorpe
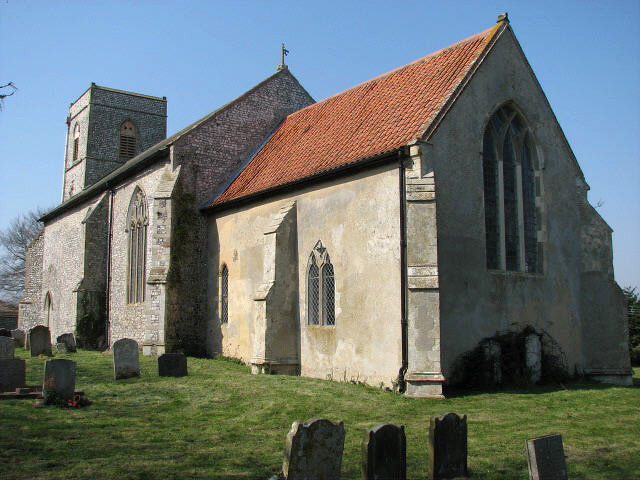
- St. Margaret's Church

- Location within Norfolk
- OS grid reference: TG1800631802
- Civil parish: Erpingham
- District: North Norfolk
- Shire county: Norfolk
- Region: East
- Country: England
- Sovereign state: United Kingdom
- Post town: NORWICH
- Postcode district: NR11
- Dialling code: 01263
- Police: Norfolk
- Fire: Norfolk
- Ambulance: East of England
- UK Parliament: North Norfolk

Calthorpe is a village in the civil parish of Erpingham, in the North Norfolk district, in the English county of Norfolk. It is 3 miles (4.8 km) north of Aylsham and 16 miles (26 km) north of Norwich.

In 1931 the parish had a population of 143. This was the last time separate population statistics for Calthorpe were recorded and in 1935 the parish was combined with the parish of Erpingham.

== History ==
In the Domesday Book, Calthorpe is recorded as a settlement of 38 households in the hundred of South Erpingham. It formed part of the estates of Roger Bigod, St Benet's Abbey and Tihel of Hellean. The Domesday survey recorded that there were two watermills in Calthorpe although no other documented evidence references the watermills until 1249. By that date there was only one watermill south of the village on the River Bure. The watermill was constructed from timber and needed constant maintenance, a situation which was documented by the rectory accounts. The mill's situation made access difficult and this eventually lead to the mill falling into disrepair until in 1453 it is recorded as having collapsed.

Within the former parish of Calthorpe, there is evidence of several manor houses dating from the medieval period but all traces have now disappeared and their exact locations are not known. The names of three have been recorded as Calthorpe Hall, Hook Hall and Kybald Hall all of which are referred to in medieval documents and in White's gazetteer of 1845.

== Church of St. Margaret ==
The church standing today was first built in the medieval period, although there are remnants of an earlier Norman church within the building. The Norman church replaced an earlier church. Most of the remaining church was built in the 13th century. The church tower was built in the 13th century and is unbuttressed and faced in knapped flint work. Internally the tower has a low arch with several courses of mouldings which finish into the impost. The chancel dates from the 13th century with the nave being re-built sometime in the 15th century. Originally there was a porch on the south elevation doorway now gone. On the north elevation is the door used today which has a recess above the door on the inside which once contained a Saint Christopher as was the practice of placing the saint opposite the main entrance to welcome the parishioners and travellers to the church. The timber roof of the nave dates from the medieval period and is constructed with rows of Arch-braced trusses.

The nave has four early English triple lancets perpendicular windows of which only one has any decoration. The widow in the chancel was installed in 1822. The octagonal font dates from the 15th century and sits on a pedestal with four lions, one to each corner with double tracery panel between each hunched lion. The octagonal bowls panels are also decorated with tracery with the underside of the bowl supported by carved demi-figures of angels. The font is topped with a red and green brightly decorated cover which towers above the font. The cover originates from the parish church of Saint Andrews at Buxton.

== Gallery ==
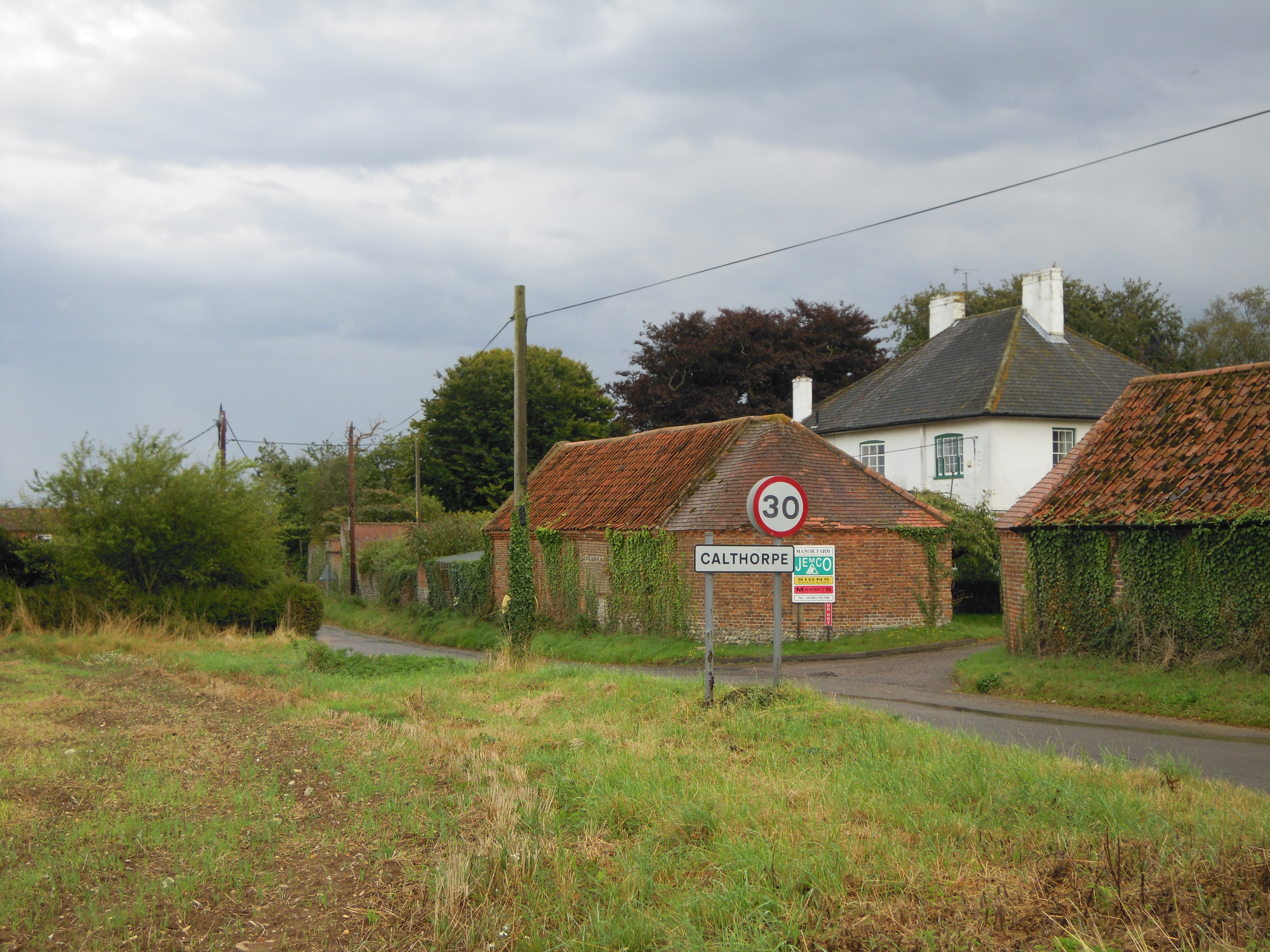
The approach to the western side of the village from the direction of Wolterton and Wickmere.

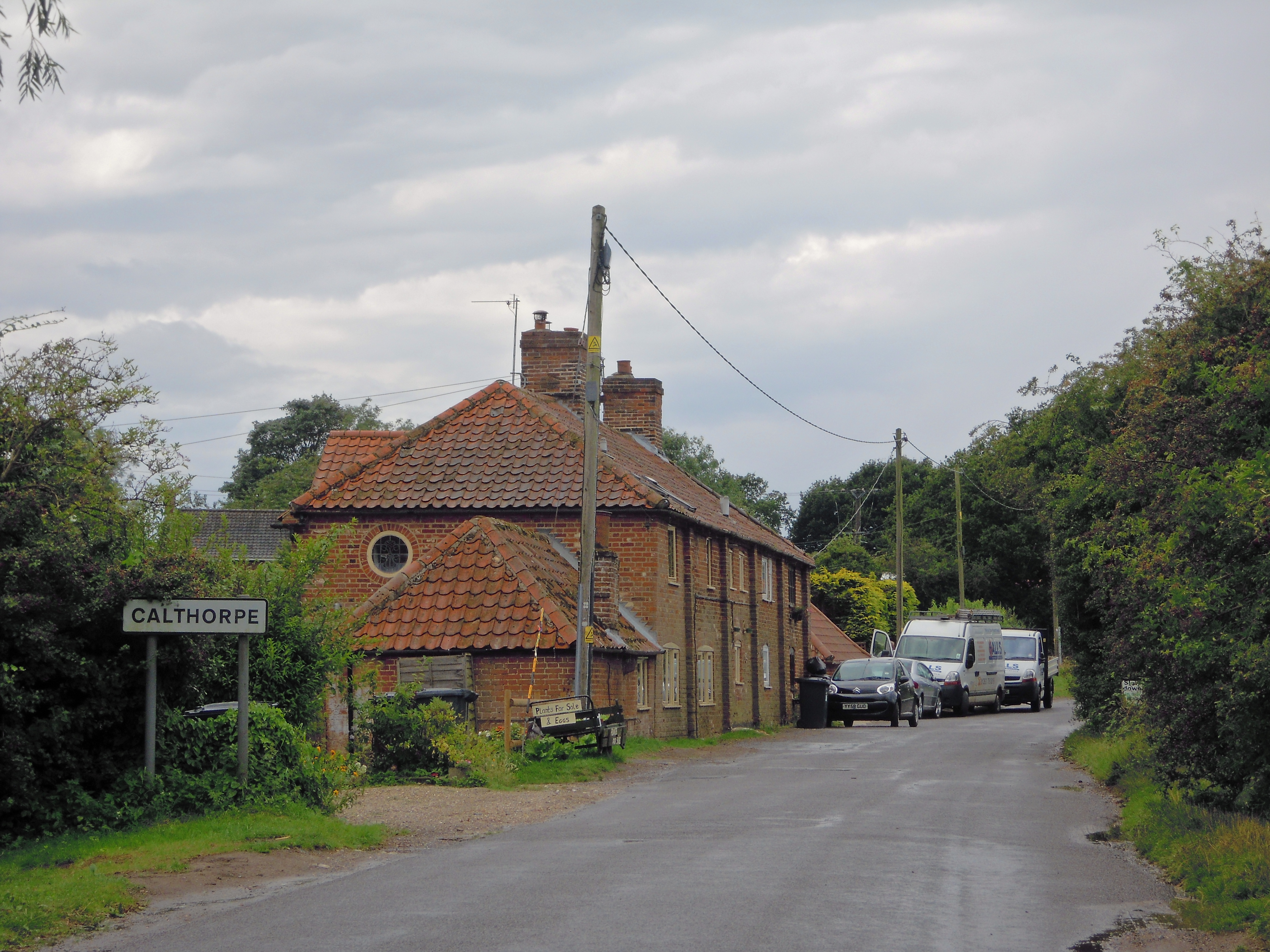
The approach to the village from Erpingham where the lane crosses Scarrow Beck.

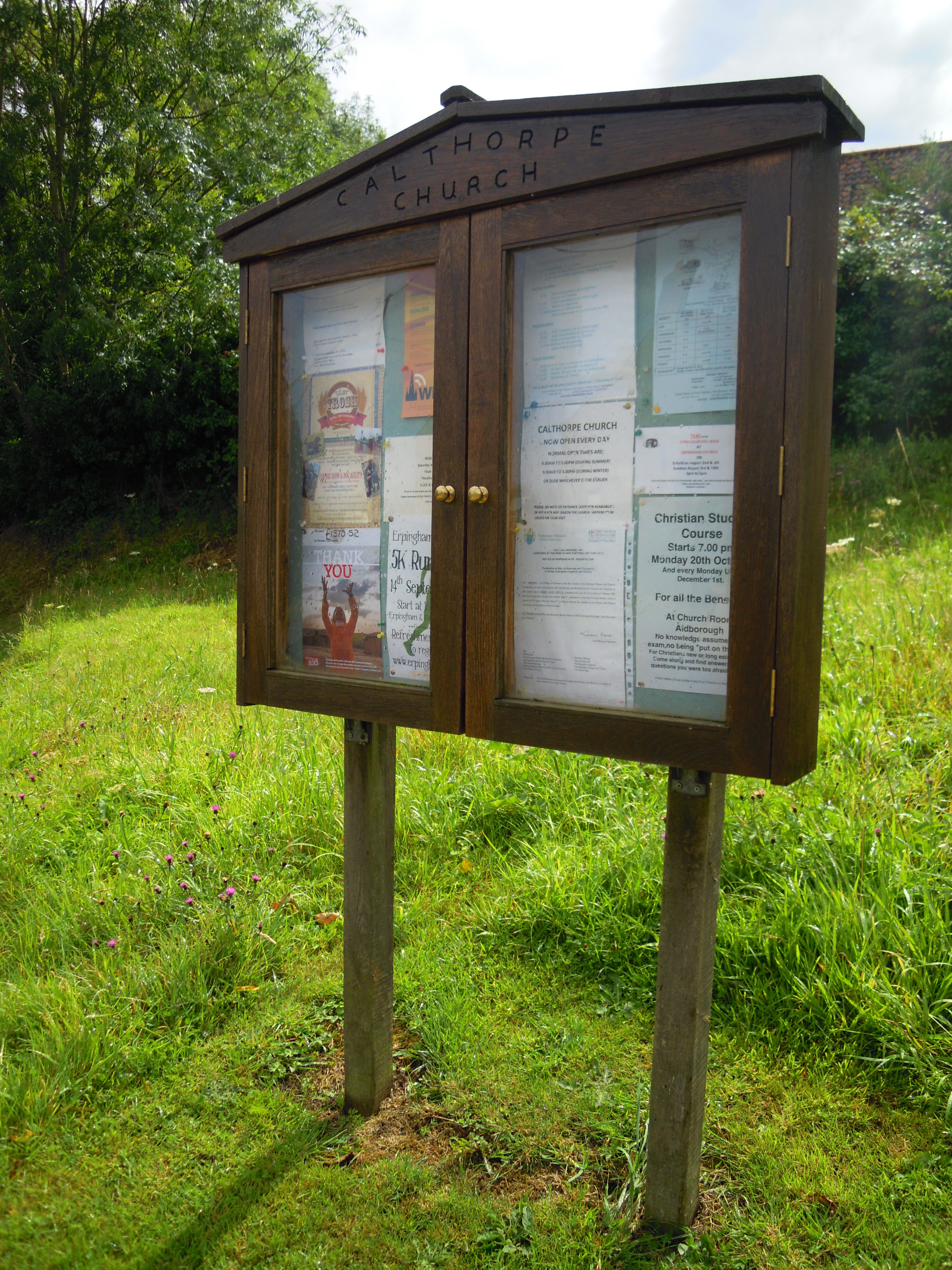
The village notice board which stands outside the boundary wall of the parish church of Our Lady and Saint Margaret.

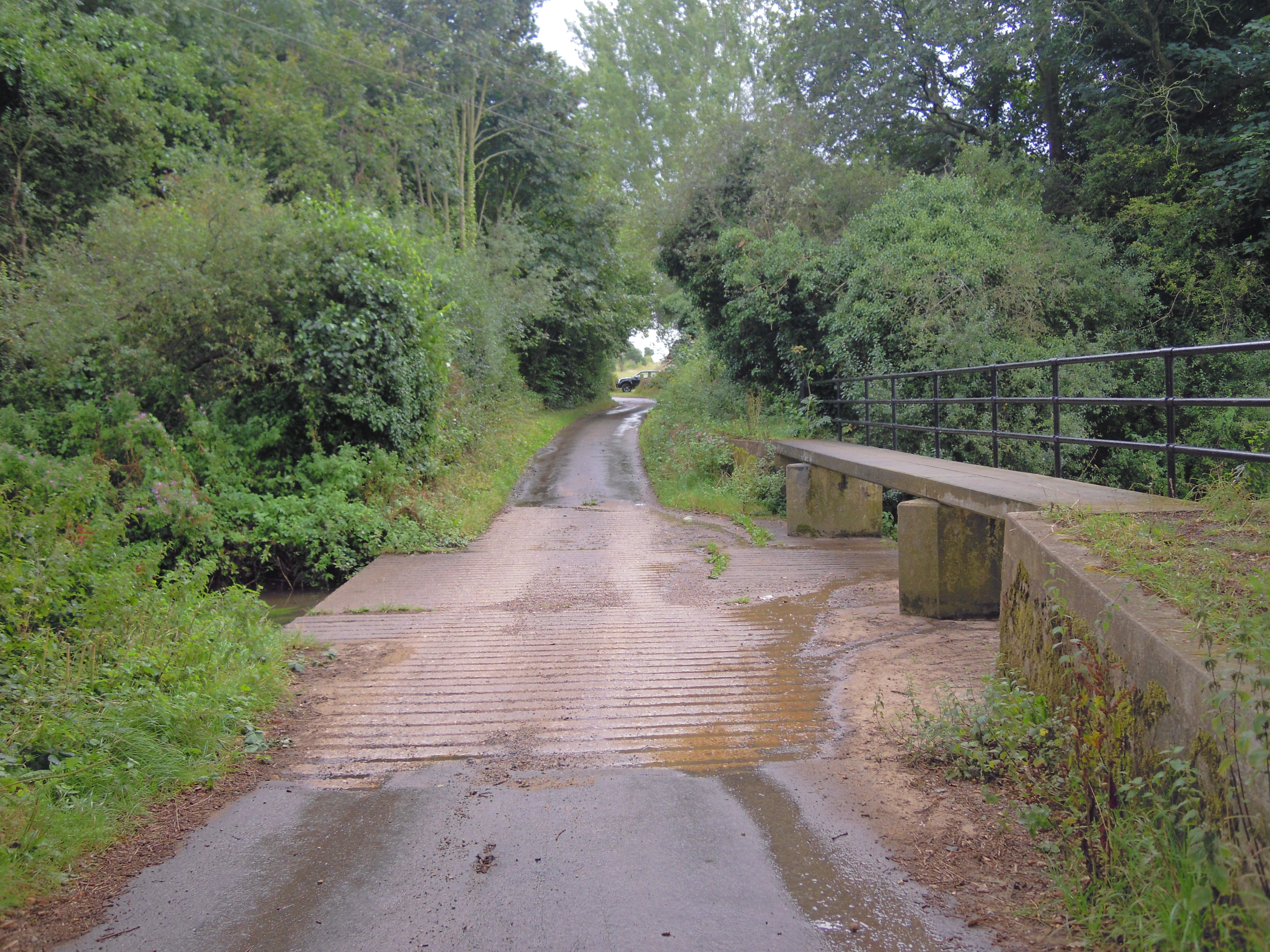
The Un-bridged ford across Scarrow Beck a short distance south of the village.

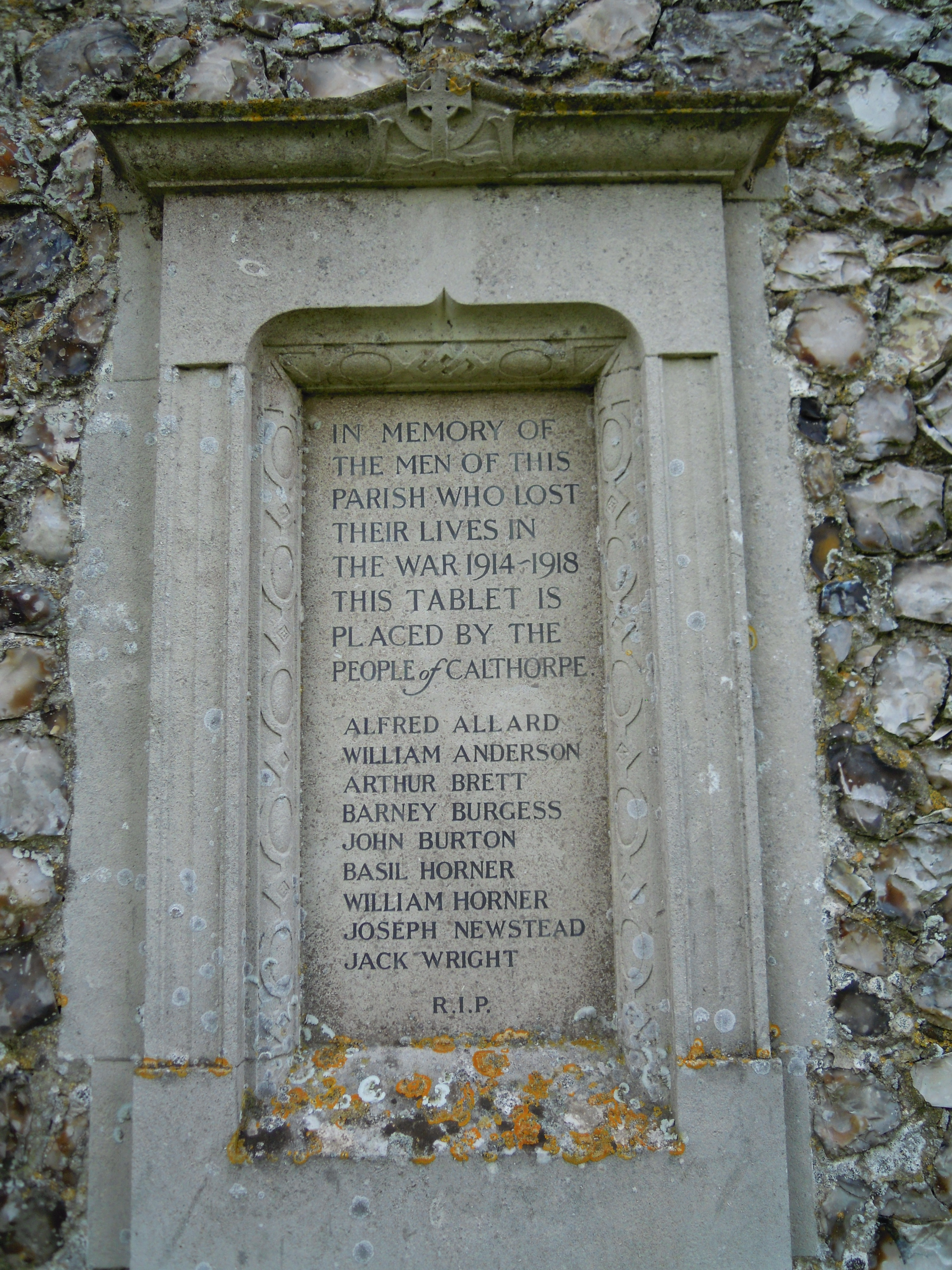
This memorial set into the wall of the Parish Church commemorates the men of Calthorpe who gave there lives during the First World War 1914 to 1918.

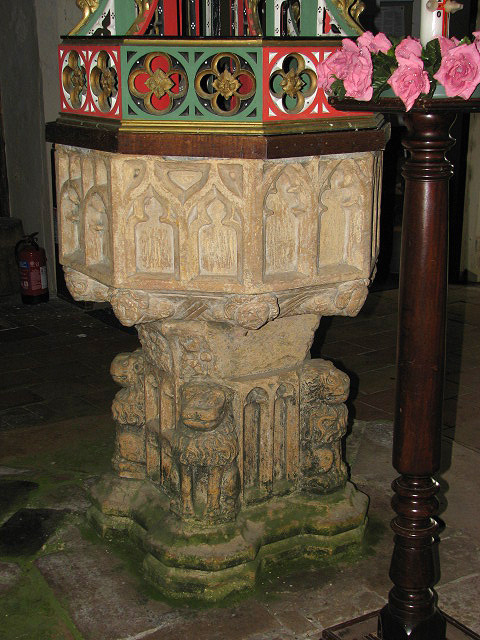
the 15th-century octagonal font with bowl panels decorated with tracery with the underside of the bowl supported by carved demi-figures of angels. The pedestal has four hunched lions, one to each corner with a double tracery panel between each lion.

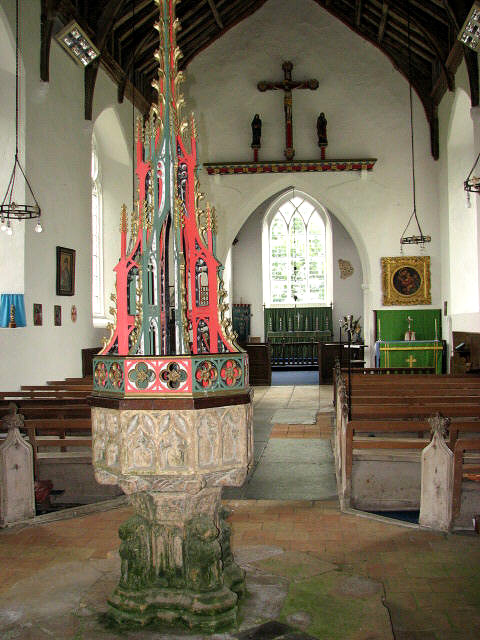
The tall ornate font cover of the font dates from the 20th century and originates from the parish church in Buxton, Norfolk.
