= Elizabeth Grimston =

English poet

Elizabeth Grimston (also Grymeston or Grimeston; c. 1563 – c. 1603) was an English poet.

== Life ==
She was born in North Erpingham, Norfolk, England, to parents Martin Bernye (Barney), Esquire of Gunton, Norfolk, and Margaret Flint. She was the fifth child in the family, with a younger sister Margaret. Elizabeth's father, a prominent lawyer, was the owner of a large amount of land in Gunton, Norfolk, including Gunton Hall and St. Andrew's Church in Gunton.

She married Christopher, the youngest son of Thomas Grimston of Grimston, Yorkshire. Her married life appears to have been rendered miserable by the cruelty of her mother, whereby she became a chronic invalid. Reduced, as she described it, to the condition of "a dead woman among the living", she "resolved to break the barren soil of her fruitless brain," and devoted herself to the compilation of a moral guide-book for the benefit of her son Bernye Grymeston, the only survivor of her nine children. She died in 1603 before the publication of her work, which appeared under the title of Miscelanea : Meditations : Memoratives, by Elizabeth Grymeston, London, 1604, 4to.

== Marriage ==
In 1584, when Elizabeth was about 21, she married Christopher Grymeston, son of Thomas Grymeston and Dorothy Thwaytes of Smeeton, Yorkshire. Their marriage was a struggling one that seemed to be subject to much scandal. On 17 December 1578, at the age of 14, Christopher Grymeston had been admitted as a pensioner to the Bachelor's table at Caius College in Cambridge. Christopher received his bachelor's degree in 1582–1583, and was admitted as a fellow-commoner in 1584 at the school. After he received his master's in 1586, he became a fellow of the college (1587–1592), serving as bursar in 1588.

While Christopher was successful at the college, his role paid a toll on his marriage. Fellows at Caius were not allowed to retain their fellowships after marriage. Residence was required of all fellows, especially for the office of bursar. Christopher's upholding of these requirements and his prolonged place as a fellow at the school mean that his marriage to Elizabeth was kept secret for almost ten years. Difficulties within the marriage and its secrecy from the school may have led Christopher to sever ties with Caius in 1592. On 21 January 1592, he joined Gray's Inn, one of the four Inns of Court in London, to practise as a barrister.

The couple's hidden relationship was not the only scandal during their marriage. In a book written for her son, Elizabeth revealed that she suffered under her mother's wrath and feared for her husband's life, stating that Christopher was threatened with numerous attempts of violence. The sole purpose of Elizabeth's book was to advise her son, should she die before she could teach him how to live as a proper, pious man.

Margaret Flint's hostility to her daughter arose from a dispute over Martin Bernye's will. Under normal circumstances, Bernye's numerous estates would pass to Elizabeth's eldest brother Marmaduke. Bernye, however, ultimately changed his will, making Elizabeth and Christopher the ultimate heirs to the Bernye lands, which included Gunton Hall, Netherhall, and various pieces of land in Gunton, as well as Thorpe Market, Suffield, Antingham, Hanworth Abbey, and Bradfield. This angered Elizabeth's mother, who was wholly removed from any rights to wealth and power. Ultimately, however, it was she who prospered; she outlived her daughter and all the property was placed in her name.

Elizabeth and Christopher Grymeston's religious beliefs were also a cause of strife in the family and may have fuelled disputes with her mother. Both Elizabeth and her husband were labelled as recusants — those who chose Catholic leanings over the Church of England. In her book, Elizabeth uses a decidedly Catholic-inspired curriculum for her son to learn from; many of the poems and teachings that inspired her work came from the Catholic tradition. Historians have also found evidence that Elizabeth's kinsman, Robert Southwell, SJ, was hanged, drawn and quartered at Tyburn for his Catholic beliefs in 1594. Elizabeth was most likely in London at the time, as Christopher had just begun his time at Gray's Inn; she quotes him many times throughout her book, and it is clear that his Catholic sympathies were used as inspiration for her writings. Throughout her work, Elizabeth frequently quoted a contemporary Catholic poet, Richard Rowlands (Verstegan), who fled from the continent as a recusant. Her clearly Catholic leanings became a main issue in the book for her son, and would most likely have been a point of conflict between the author and her mother, who held the state religion. Christopher may also have been a practising Catholic. In the book, Elizabeth references her fear for her husband's life and the attempts made to harm him. This may also have led to conflict with Caius, leading to his departure from the school.

== Work ==
Elizabeth Grymeston's only work, Miscellanea. Meditations. Memoratives, was released posthumously in 1604, to much popularity, enough so that four editions of the book were published in the span of fourteen years. The first edition of the book held fourteen chapters, while the last three included an additional six essays.

Miscellanea was written as an address to Elizabeth's only living son Bernye as a form of guidance, should she be dead before she had time to raise him. Elizabeth drew on her sense of maternal solitude to address both her son and her readers with "directness and simplicity [with] her frequent use of arresting, concrete images, and her ability to assimilate and even to alter quotations from many sources for her own purposes".

The book is divided into 14 so-called chapters, most of which are brief essays on religious topics. The eleventh chapter is headed 'Morning Meditation, with sixteen sobs of a sorrowful spirit, which she used for a mentall prayer, as also an addition of sixteen staves taken out of "Peter's Complaint" (Southwell's), which she usually played on the winde instrument,' and the twelfth is 'a Madrigall made by Bernye Grymestone upon the conceit of his mother's play to the former ditties.' The thirteenth chapter consists of 'Odes in imitation of the seven pœnitentiall psalms in seven severall kindes of verse.' The 'Memoratives' are a number of moral maxims, which, if not original, are at least pointed and well chosen. The dedication, addressed to the author's son, is a quaint piece of composition, containing good advice for moral guidance and on the choice of a wife; it is reprinted in W. C. Hazlitt's 'Prefaces, Dedications, and Epistles,' 1874. Two later and undated editions of the Miscelanea were published, enlarged by the addition of six other short essays.

One of the many noticeable features of Elizabeth's writing was her use of quotations and concepts from fellow writers, both past and contemporary. While many of her sources were widely recognised, at many points throughout her advice book she failed to reference who she is quoting or borrowing from. In many passages, she paraphrased ideas to suit her own needs, making others' work her own. Numerous sections of her essays contain poetry, and while some scholars call her a poet, none of the verses were her own. While she combined many poems, and altered lines and stanzas, she always conserved the overall meaning of the work. One of the main sources of Elizabeth's passages was England's Parnassus, which many quotes and ideas had been derived from.

Grimston's method of borrowing others' work and making it her own not only made her work more successful and convincing, but also proved her high level of education. Her knowledge of the Bible, as well as Latin, Italian, and Greek become quite clear as readers encounter the numerous quotes and passages she derives from various works she would have been familiar with during her time. "Parallel sentiment" in the two parts of her book, as well as continued proof of knowledge and familiarity with religion, are evidence that Elizabeth wrote the book in its entirety herself.

== Death ==
Little is known about the death of Elizabeth Grymeston. There are no death records or cause of death for Elizabeth, but she was not alive when her book was published in 1604; she probably died in 1602–1603. Scholars propose that the editor of the first two editions of her work was Christopher, as the second edition has an authentic coat of arms, implying that a member of her family was closely involved in its publication and authorised it.
