= Robert Lyminge =

Robert Lyminge (fl. 1607–1628) was an English carpenter and architect. His surname is also sometimes spelt Lemyinge or Liminge.

Lyminge's earliest record of employment is dated 1607 at the almshouses at Theobalds in Hertfordshire.

From 1607 to 1612 he was in charge of the design and construction of Hatfield House for Robert Cecil, 1st Earl of Salisbury. But Inigo Jones is also known to have been consulted about the design, and who may be responsible for some of the detail on the south front. In 1616–17 Lyminge was designing Blickling Hall in Norfolk for Sir Henry Hobart, 1st Baronet. Between 1621 and 1624, Lyminge built Felbrigg Hall, also in Norfolk, for Thomas Windham.

Lyminge was buried in the churchyard at Blickling on 8 January 1628.

Both country houses are typical examples of Jacobean architecture, brick built with stone mouldings around the windows and doors, with stone string courses and quoins, the central feature of each building is a clock tower, stone at Hatfield House and wood designed and painted to look like stone at Blickling.

The architectural details of both buildings are Renaissance, though much use is made of mullioned bay windows and strapwork decoration in parapets, and elaborate Flemish gables. The interiors at Hatfield are well preserved with much original carpentry work, especially in the Great Hall. Both houses have grand staircases with cantilevered wooden steps, arched balustrades with carved figures on the newel posts. The staircase at Blickling was moved in the 18th century and additional flights added to make it symmetrical. Hatfield retains its elaborate plaster ceilings and great marble fireplaces with columned overmantels, whereas Blickling has lost most its internal features, though the highly elaborate plaster ceiling in the library (originally the long gallery) survives with its allegories on the theme of the five senses.

== Gallery of architectural work ==
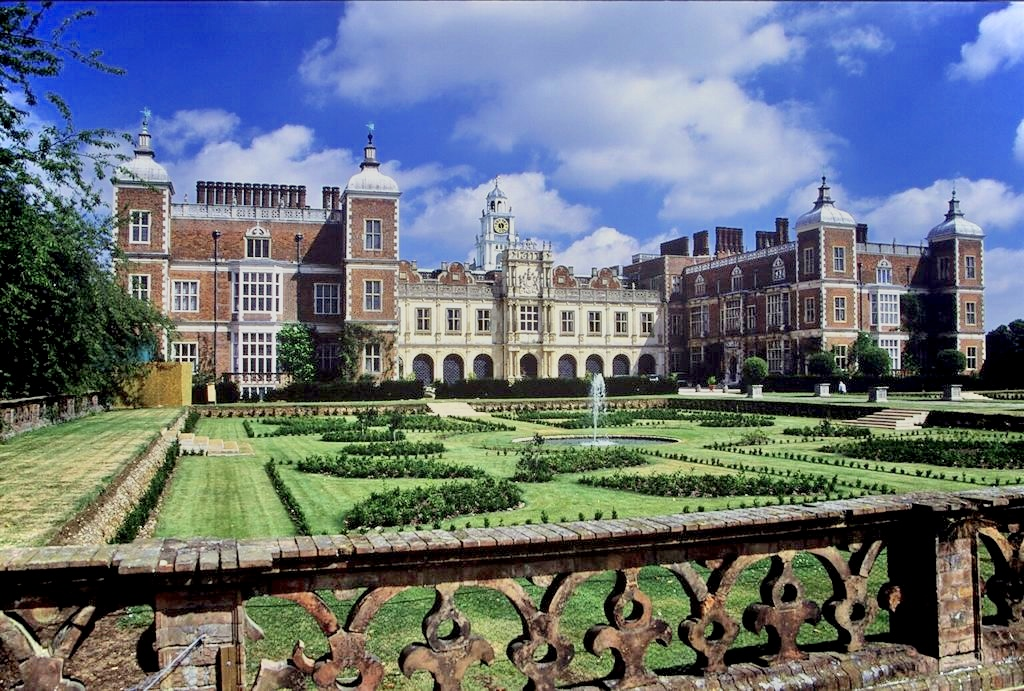
Hatfield House, south front

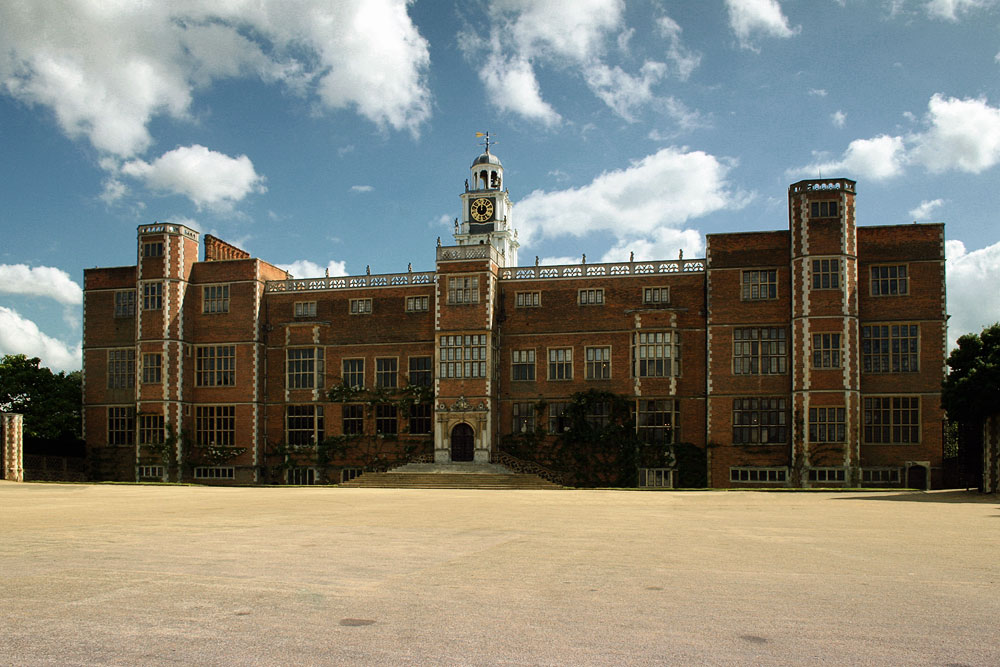
Hatfield House, north front

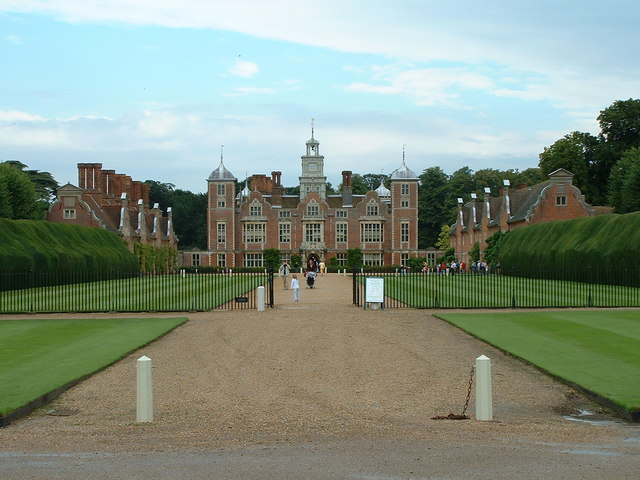
Blickling Hall, west front

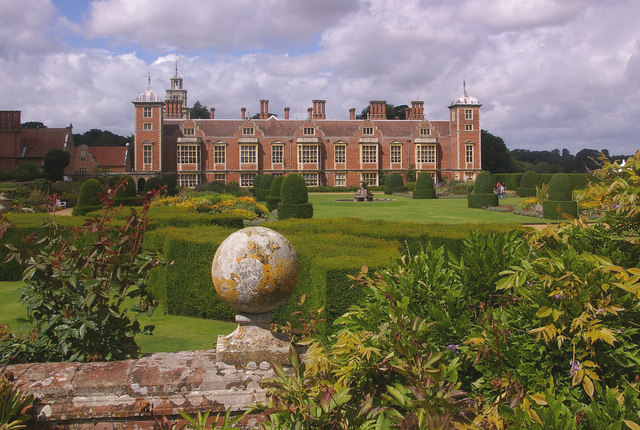
Blickling Hall, south front
