= William Wyndham =

William Wyndham may refer to:

- Sir William Wyndham, 1st Baronet (c. 1632–1683), of Orchard Wyndham, English politician, Member of Parliament for Somerset, 1656–1658 and for Taunton 1660–1679
- Sir William Wyndham, 3rd Baronet (1687–1740), of Orchard Wyndham, English politician, Chancellor of the Exchequer, 1713–1714, Member of Parliament for Somerset, 1710–1740
- The Hon. William Frederick Wyndham (1763–1828), English diplomat
- William Wyndham (1796–1862), English MP for Wiltshire South, 1852–1859

== See also ==
- Wyndham baronets
- Earl of Egremont
- William Windham (disambiguation)
