= Steve Goble =

English footballer

Personal information
- Full name: Stephen Richard Goble
- Date of birth: 5 September 1960 (age 66)
- Place of birth: Erpingham, England
- Position: Left winger

Youth career
- Norwich City

Senior career*
Years	Team	Apps	(Gls)
1978–1981	Norwich City	30	(2)
1981–1984	Groningen	40	(3)
1983–1984	→ Veendam (loan)	26	(8)
1984	Norwich City	1	(0)
1984–1985	Utrecht	10	(2)
1985–1986	Groningen	18	(1)
1986–1988	Heracles	8	(0)
1988	Cambridge United	2	(0)
1988	Skellefteå AIK		
Total		135	(16)
- * Club domestic league appearances and goals

Stephen Richard Goble (born 5 September 1960) is an English retired footballer who played in England, the Netherlands and Sweden as a left winger.

== Career ==
Born in Erpingham, Goble played for Norwich City, Groningen, Veendam, Utrecht, Heracles, Cambridge United and Skellefteå AIK.

He later moved to the United States to work as a coach.

== Personal life ==
Goble's brother, Nolan, was killed in the April 2009 North Sea helicopter crash, off the coast of Aberdeen.
