= William Frederick Windham =

British subject of a lunacy case (1840–1866)

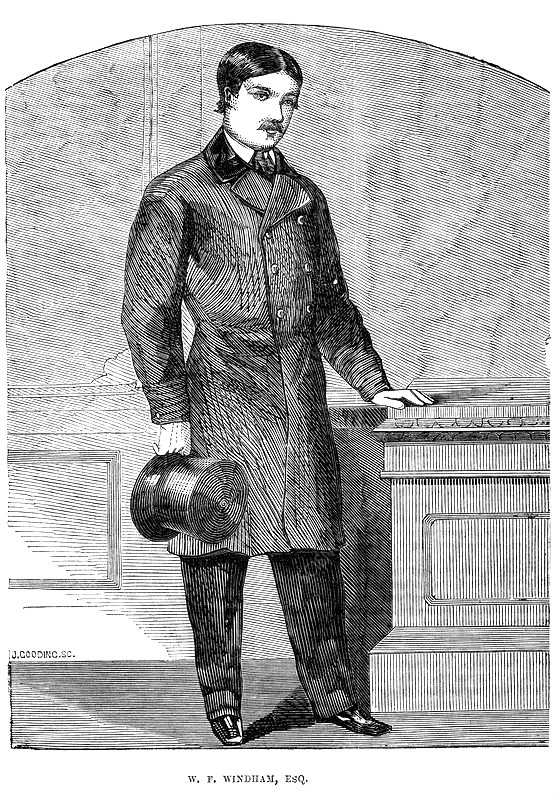
- William Windham in 1861
- Born: 9 August 1840; Erpingham, Norfolk, England
- Died: 2 February 1866 (aged 25)
- Education: Eton College
- Occupation: Land owner
- Spouse: Anne Agnes Willoughby
- Parents: William Howe Windham; Lady Sophia Hervey

William Frederick Windham (9 August 1840 – 2 February 1866) was the son of William Howe Windham and the heir to Felbrigg Hall in the county of Norfolk, England. In 1861–62, he was the subject of a "lunacy" case after he married a woman of whom his uncle did not approve, causing his family to claim that he was incapable of managing his affairs. Windham won the case in a ruling that characterised him as eccentric rather than a lunatic.

The case was described in the British Journal of Psychiatry as "a significant event in psychiatric history" in the transition from "legal management in psychiatric illness and towards medical management".

A spendthrift, Windham frittered away his considerable fortune and, facing legal fees of £20,000 from the case, was forced to declare bankruptcy and sell Felbrigg Hall. He moved into a local hotel but continued his dissolute lifestyle and worked as a coach driver before dying at the age of 25.

== Early life and education ==
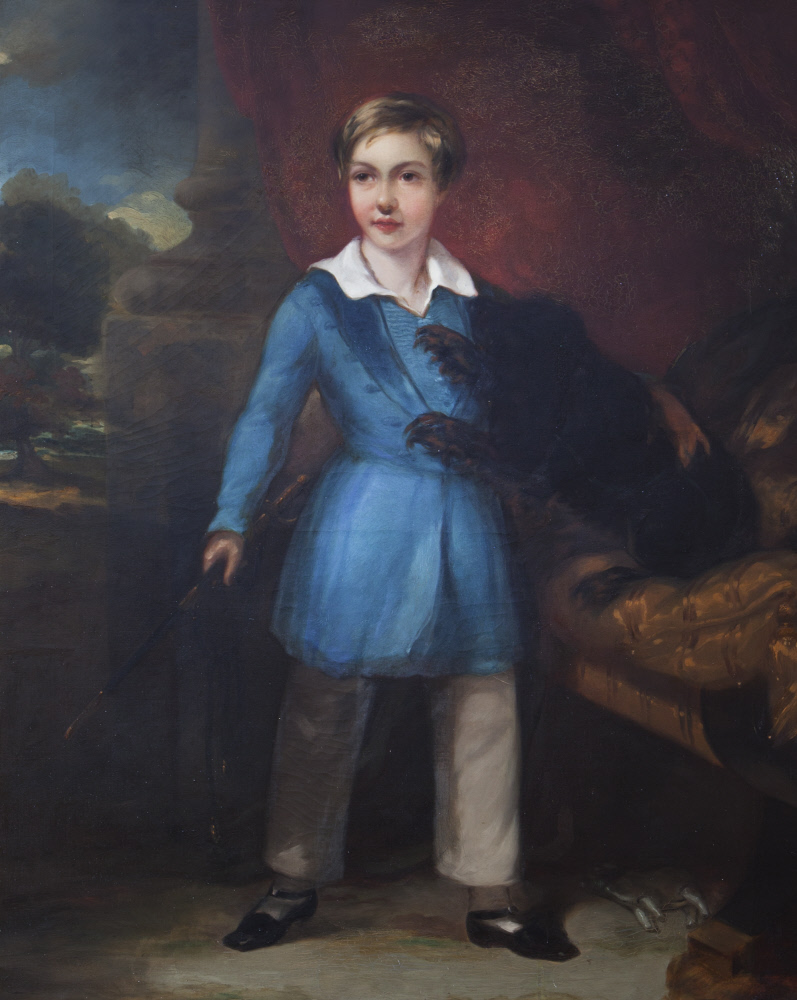
William Frederick Windham. Oil on canvas, c. 1850. Felbrigg, Norfolk.

William Windham was born at Erpingham, Norfolk, on 9 August 1840, the son of William Howe Windham and Lady Sophia Windham, née Hervey, daughter of Frederick Hervey, 1st Marquess of Bristol. The Hervey family had a reputation for eccentricity. Around 1850, he was the subject of a portrait which is located at Felbrigg Hall. His father died in 1854, appointing his mother and his uncle General Charles Ash Windham as his guardians, but his uncle was often away on duty and his mother remarried to a much younger man and abandoned Felbrigg to live with him.

Windham was educated at private schools from the age of eight, from one of which he was ejected for foul language, before entering Eton College in 1853. He left in 1856 and spent periods at establishments intended to provide training to enter the law (1857) or the army (1858–59), but did not enter either profession.

== Adulthood ==
At the age of 21, on 9 August 1861, Windham inherited Felbrigg Hall and annual rents from the estate of £3,100 before the deduction of an annual £1,500 annuity to his mother and the costs of the estate's upkeep. This income would have increased in 1869 when he would have become entitled to the rents from the Hanworth estate, also in Norfolk.

On 30 August 1861, he married Anne (or Ann) Agnes Willoughby, also known as Rogers, in London. He settled £800 per annum on her, to be increased to £1,500 in 1869.

== Lunacy case ==
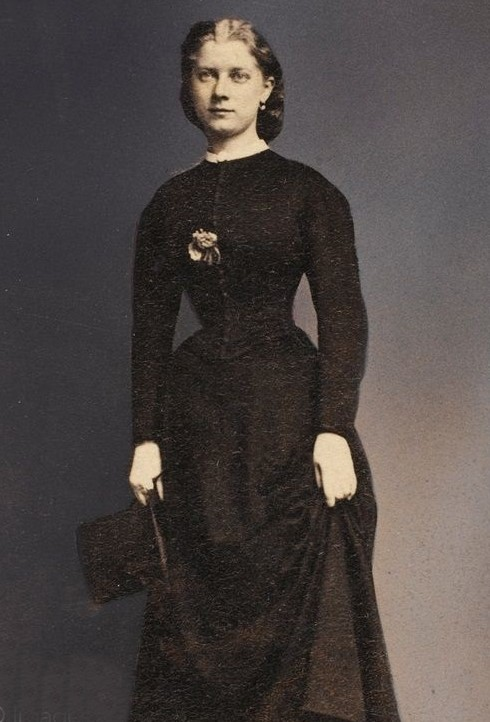
Anne Agnes Willoughby in riding habit, 1860s

In 1861–62, after his marriage to Anne Willoughby, of whom his uncle did not approve, Windham was the subject of a noted "lunacy" case in which it was argued that he was incapable of managing his own affairs. The case was heard before a jury, called 140 witnesses, and lasted 34 days, ending in January 1862. It was the longest and most expensive lunacy case in English history which contemporary press reports attributed partly to the per diem pay of the jury which gave them no incentive to work faster. One report commented, "Of course they can't do it. The more they try the more they can't; and, as practice makes perfect, the more they never will". When the verdict eventually arrived, Windham was found to be of sound mind but left with legal fees of £20,000.

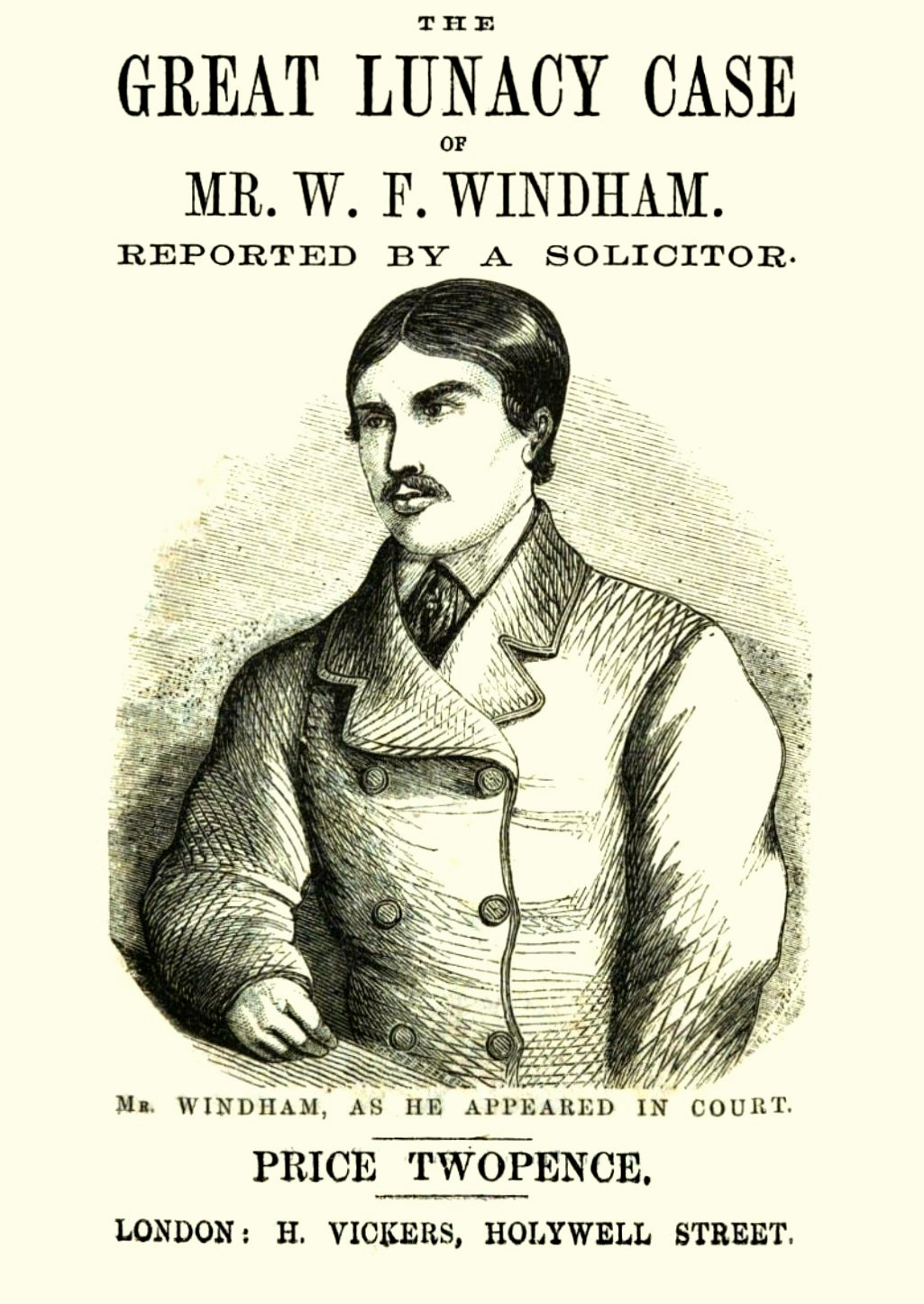
Title page of The Great Lunacy Case of Mr. W. F. Windham. Reported by a Solicitor. (1862)

The case caused a public sensation and was described in the book The Great Lunacy Case of Mr. W. F. Windham. Reported by a Solicitor (1862). The same year, he was the subject of a ballad telling his story. Contemporary press opinion was that the case threatened to set a dangerous precedent and become a threat to liberty if someone was declared a lunatic merely because they lived a dissolute or immoral life. The Lancet commented that "the error running through this lamentable case seems to be a blind or perverse confounding of vice with insanity".

In 1971, the case was described in the British Journal of Psychiatry as "a significant event in psychiatric history" in the transition from "legal management in psychiatric illness and towards medical management".

== Later life and legacy ==
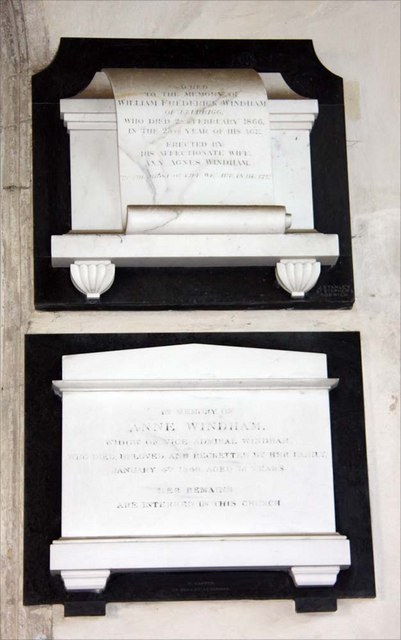
Monument to Windham erected by his wife at St Margaret's Church, Felbrigg. (upper plaque)

A spendthrift, Windham frittered away his considerable fortune which, combined with the £20,000 legal fees from his case, eventually forced him to declare bankruptcy and sell Felbrigg Hall to John Ketton (formerly John Kitton) in 1863. It was said at the time that "Windham is gone to the dogs. Felbrigg has gone to the Kittens". He moved into the Norfolk Hotel in Norwich but his dissolute ways continued and he eventually set up as a coach driver. He died on 2 February 1866 and was buried in the family vault at Felbrigg Hall. There is a wall plaque to his memory at St Margaret's Church, Felbrigg.

His case and life have been the subject of a number of later accounts. In 1923, the case was described in Charles Kingston's Famous Judges and Famous Trials. In 2012, he was the subject of Bring Him In Mad, a fictionalised retelling by Russell Croft. Also in 2012, his marriage was the subject of A Scandal at Felbrigg.

== See also ==
- Antonio Giuglini
