= Erpingham =

Village in Norfolk, England

Coordinates: 52.840°N 1.253°E

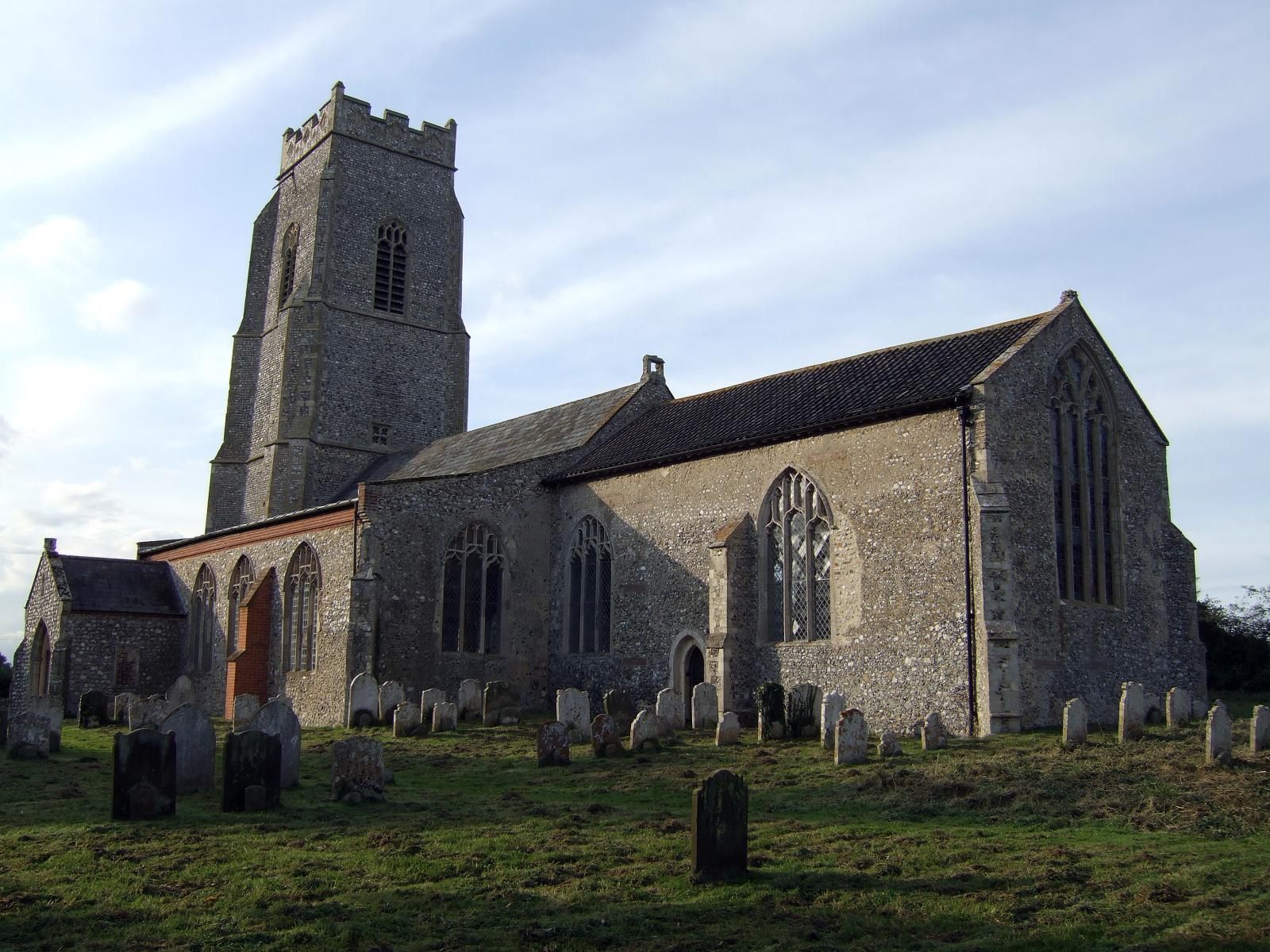
- Church of St. Mary

- Location within Norfolk
- Area: 4.71 sq mi (12.2 km^{2})
- Population: 737 (2021 census)
  - Density: 156/sq mi (60/km^{2})
- OS grid reference: TG192319
  - London: 108 miles (174 km)
- Civil parish: Erpingham with Calthorpe
- District: North Norfolk
- Shire county: Norfolk
- Region: East
- Country: England
- Sovereign state: United Kingdom
- Post town: NORWICH
- Postcode district: NR11
- Dialling code: 01263
- Police: Norfolk
- Fire: Norfolk
- Ambulance: East of England
- UK Parliament: North Norfolk

Erpingham (/ˈɑːpɪŋəm/ AH-ping-əm) is a village and civil parish in the English county of Norfolk.

Erpingham is located 3.1 miles (5.0 km) north of Aylsham and 15 miles (24 km) north of Norwich, along Scarrow Beck. The parish also includes the nearby village of Calthorpe.

== History ==
Erpingham's name is of Anglo-Saxon origin and derives from the Old English for the homestead or village of Eorp's people.

There is archaeological evidence to suggest Erpingham was the site of two Roman settlements, one of which suggests a military or religious function. Furthermore, Roman artefacts, including coins, brooches and a quern-stone, have been discovered close to the village.

In the Domesday Book, Erpingham is listed as a settlement of 27 households in the hundred of South Erpingham. In 1086, the village was divided between the East Anglian estates of Roger Bigot, St Benet's Abbey, Drogo de la Beuvrière and Ranulf brother of Ilger.

Erpingham Watermill is first recorded in the mid-Eighteenth Century as one of the smallest mills in Norfolk, drawing on the Scarrow Beck for its power. The watermill was gutted by fire in 1965 and was subsequently demolished. Erpingham Windmill dates from the late-Fourteenth Century and is a private residence today.

During the Second World War, an artillery emplacement and bunker were built in the village for use of the Home Guard.

== Geography ==
According to the 2021 census, Erpingham has a population of 737 people which shows an increase from the 700 people recorded in the 2011 census.

Erpingham is located along Scarrow Beck.

== Church of St. Mary ==
Erpingham's parish church is dedicated to Saint Mary and has a nave dating from the Fourteenth Century and a chancel from the Fifteenth Century. St. Mary's is located along Church Road, outside of the village and has been Grade I listed since 1960.

St. Mary's font is from the Nineteenth Century and was originally placed in St Benedict's Church in Norwich, but was transferred to Erpingham after the church was destroyed in the Norwich Blitz. The church also holds a good example of a Fourteenth Century brass memorial dedicated to Sir John de Erpingham, an English soldier present at the Battle of Agincourt, and installed by his son, Sir Thomas Erpingham. Additionally, St. Mary's has good examples of British and Continental stained-glass, largely copied from examples in Blickling Hall and restored in the Twenty-first Century by King & Son.

== Amenities ==
Erpingham's 'Spread Eagle' public house has stood on its current site since the late eighteenth century. In its long history, the Spread Eagle has been owned by Watney & Mann Brewery and Woodforde's and was briefly known as the Erpingham Arms from 2011 to 2017.

Local children usually attend Erpingham Church of England Primary School which is part of the Blue Sky Federation. After an Ofsted inspection in October 2023, the school was given a rating of 'Requires Improvement.'

== Notable residents ==
- Sir Thomas Erpingham KG- (1347–1428) soldier and administrator, Lord of Erpingham manor.
- Elizabeth Grimston- (1563-1603) poet, born in Erpingham.
- Jacob Mountain, Bishop of Quebec- (1749-1825) clergyman and judge, born in Erpingham.
- Nathaniel Pilch- (1793-1881) Norfolk cricketer, died in Erpingham.
- William Frederick Windham- (1840-1866) aristocrat, born in Erpingham.
- Sir Kenneth Hagar Kemp, 12th Baronet- (1853-1936) lawyer, soldier and banker, born in Erpingham.
- Sir Graham Savage CB- (1886-1981) civil servant, born in Erpingham.
- Grace Marcon- (1889-1965) Suffragette, born in Erpingham.
- Steven Wright- (born 1958) serial killer, born in Erpingham.
- Steve Goble- (1960-2009) Norwich City and FC Groningen footballer, born in Erpingham.

== Governance ==
Erpingham is an electoral ward for local elections and is part of the district of North Norfolk.

The village's national constituency is North Norfolk, which has been represented by the Liberal Democrat Steff Aquarone MP since 2024.

== War memorial ==
Erpingham War Memorial is a stone wheel-cross with a plinth inscribed with 'Pro Patria 1914-1919' inside St. Mary's Churchyard. The memorial lists the following names for the First World War:

| Rank | Name | Unit | Date of death | Burial/Commemoration |
|---|---|---|---|---|
| Gnr. | John C. Nichols | 251st Bde., Royal Field Artillery | 13 Sep. 1918 | La Ville-aux-Bois Cemetery |
| Cpl. | Bertie E. Green | 1/5th Bn., Norfolk Regiment | 13 Aug. 1915 | Helles Memorial |
| Pte. | George Warne | 1/6th Bn., Durham Light Infantry | 7 Oct. 1918 | St. Mary's Churchyard |
| Pte. | Albert Lambert | 1/9th Bn., D.L.I. | 20 Jan. 1917 | Dernancourt Cemetery |
| Pte. | Alfred E. Allard | 13th Bn., D.L.I. | 8 Oct. 1918 | Tincourt British Cemetery |
| Pte. | S. Jack Burgess | 2nd Bn., Norfolk Regiment | 18 Dec. 1916 | Basra War Cemetery |
| Pte. | John F. Ives | 1/5th Bn., Norfolk Regt. | 8 Sep. 1917 | Haifa War Cemetery |
| Pte. | S. William Bean | 9th Bn., Norfolk Regt. | 1 May 1917 | Loos Memorial |
| Pte. | Donald D. Daniels | 1/4th Bn., Northumberland Fusilers | 27 Mar. 1918 | Pozières Memorial |
| Sth. | Herbert J. Burgess | 1 (Catterick) Coy., Army Service Corps | 10 Oct. 1916 | St. Mary's Churchyard |

The following names were added after the Second World War:

| Rank | Name | Unit | Date of death | Burial/Commemoration |
|---|---|---|---|---|
| LCpl. | Harold G. Jickells | Royal Engineers | 23 Oct. 1942 | Kranji War Cemetery |
| Pte. | Noel Dennis | 4th Bn., Royal Norfolk Regiment | 29 Sep. 1943 | Kanchanaburi War Cemetery |

== Gallery ==
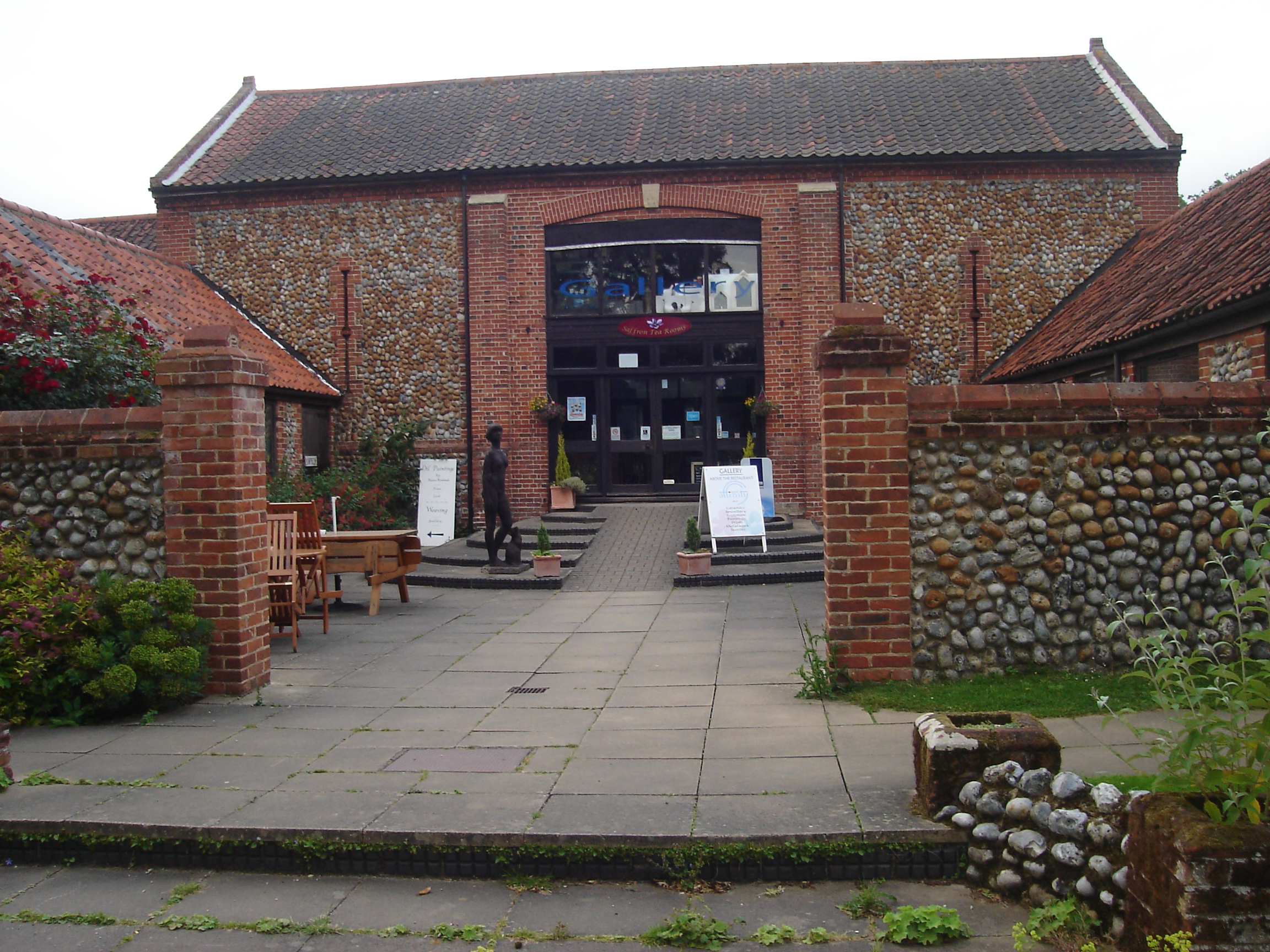
Crafts centre in the village

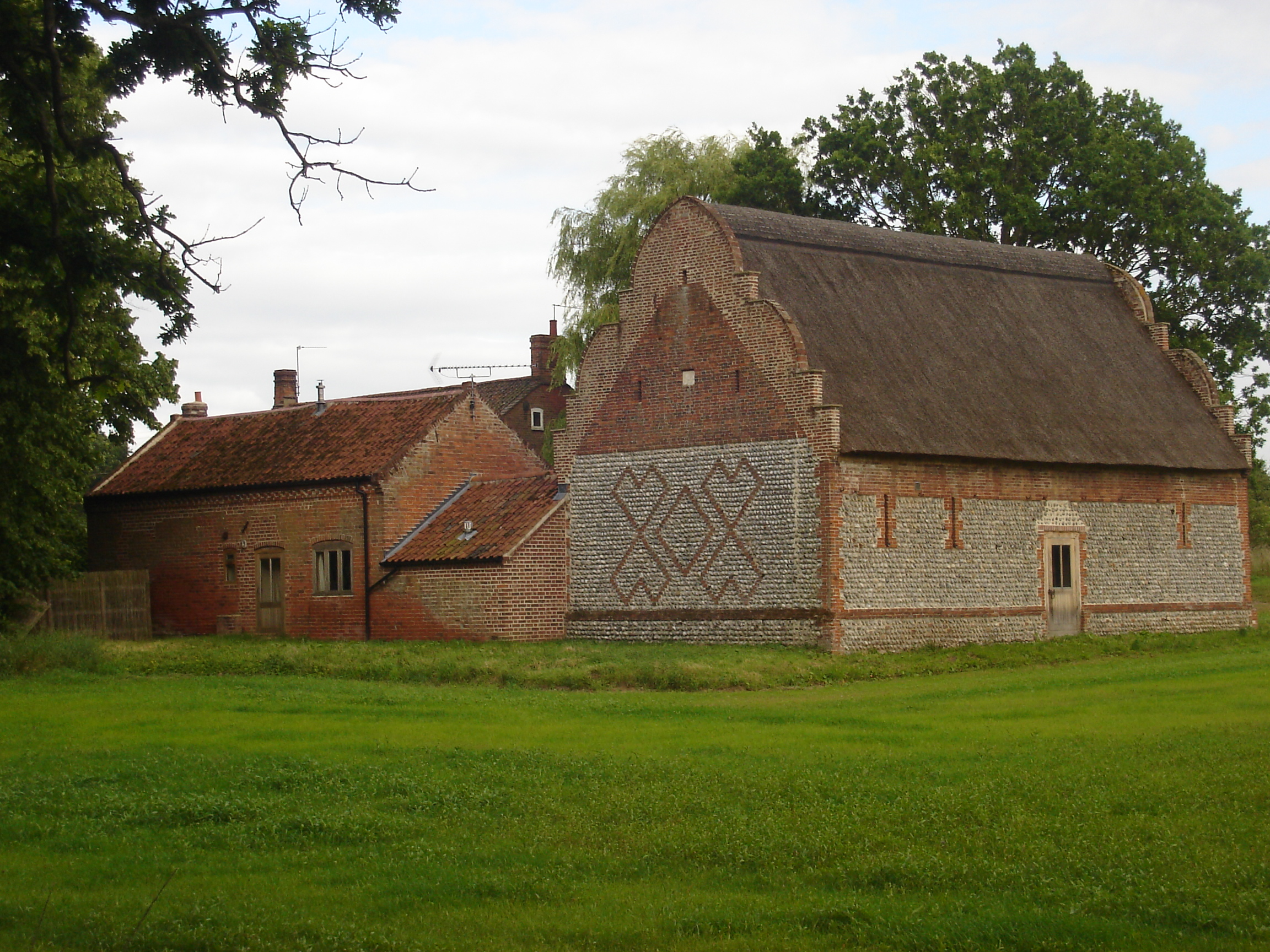
Barn conversion

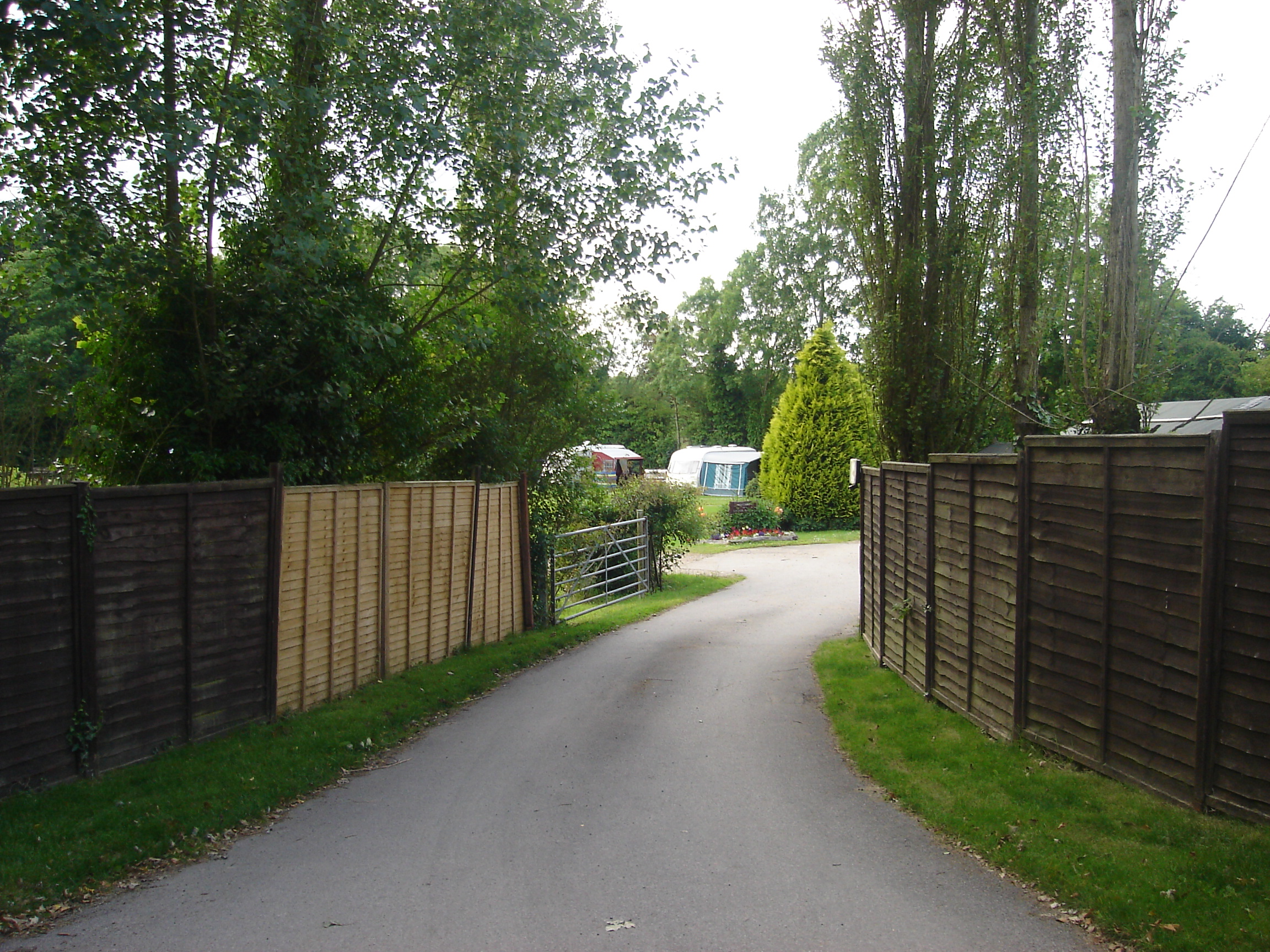
Entrance to the campsite
