= Felbrigg Woods =

UK Site of Special Scientific Interest

Coordinates: 52.913°N 1.262°E

- Site of Special Scientific Interest
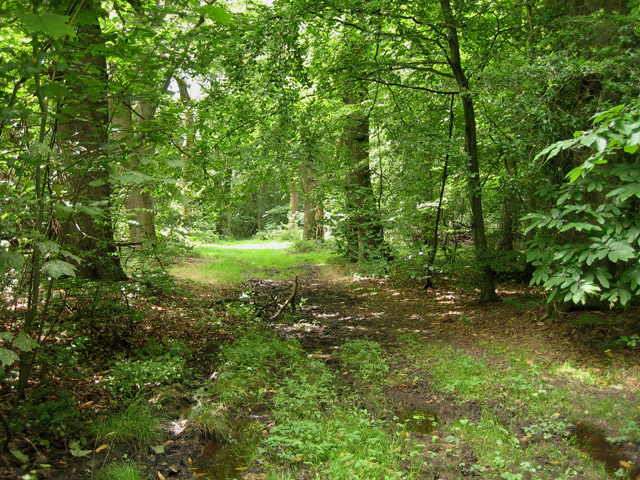
- Location of Felbrigg Woods.
- Area of search: Norfolk
- Grid reference: TG 194 400
- Interest: Biological
- Area: 164.6 hectares (407 acres)
- Notification date: 1987
- Location map: Magic Map

Felbrigg Woods is a 164.6-hectare (407-acre) biological Site of Special Scientific Interest south-west of Cromer in Norfolk, England. It is the main part of the grounds of Felbrigg Hall, a National Trust property which is listed on the Register of Historic Parks and Gardens of Special Historic Interest in England. It is a Nature Conservation Review site, Grade 2, and it is in the Norfolk Coast Area of Outstanding Natural Beauty.

Ancient trees in this wood have more than fifty species of lichen, including several which are rare in East Anglia. Many of them are indicators of ancient undisturbed woodland. The trees are mainly beech which have been pollarded many years ago, and have massive stools and boles.
