= Hanworth, Norfolk =

Village in Norfolk, England

Coordinates: 52°52′19″N 1°15′31″E

Hanworth
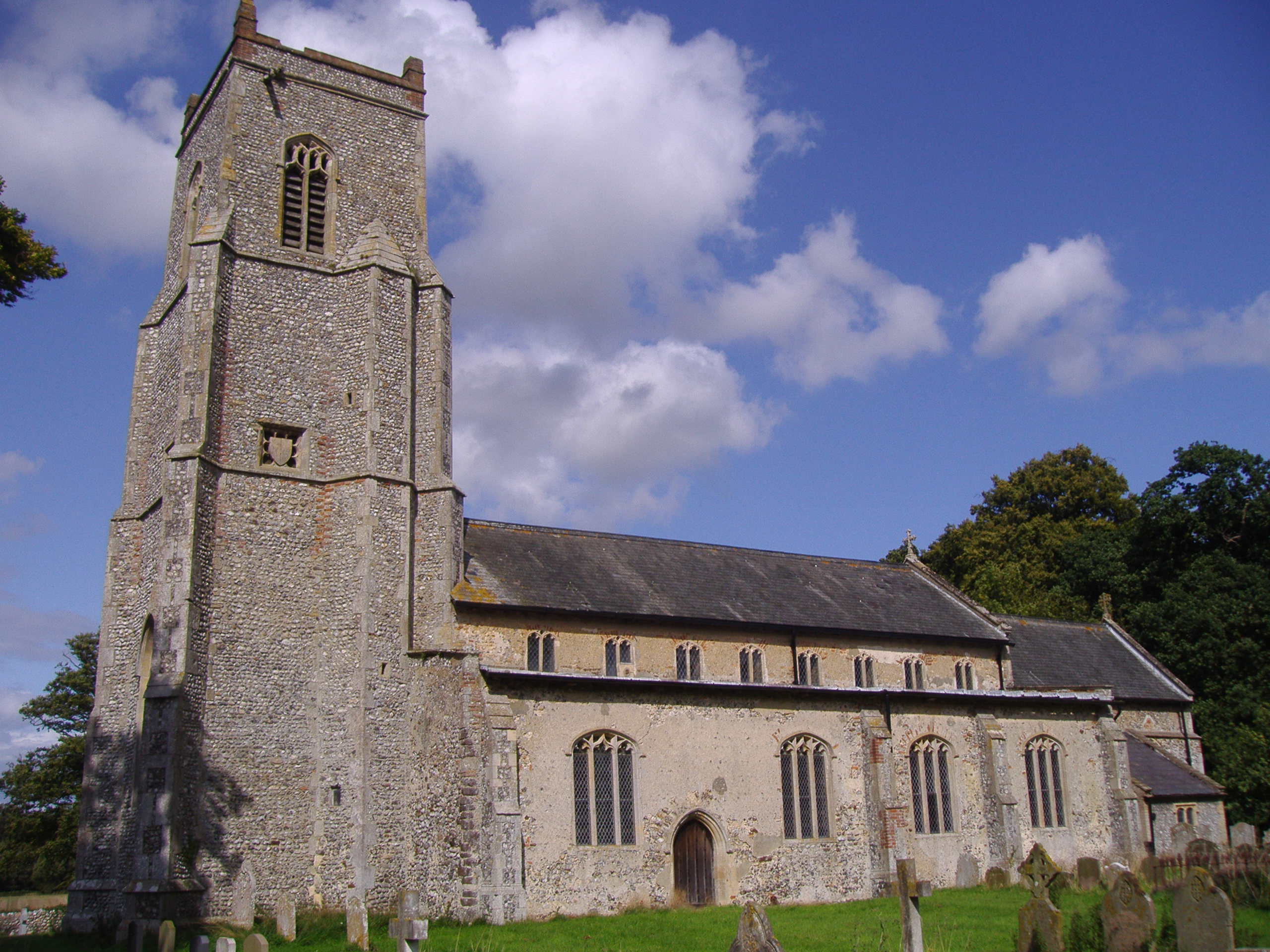
- The Parish Church of Saint Bartholomew, Hanworth Norfolk

- Location within Norfolk
- Area: 8.74 km^{2} (3.37 sq mi)
- Population: 169 (2011 census)
  - Density: 19/km^{2} (49/sq mi)
- OS grid reference: TG190350
  - London: 133 miles (214 km)
- Civil parish: Hanworth
- District: North Norfolk
- Shire county: Norfolk
- Region: East
- Country: England
- Sovereign state: United Kingdom
- Post town: NORWICH
- Postcode district: NR11
- Dialling code: 01263
- Police: Norfolk
- Fire: Norfolk
- Ambulance: East of England
- UK Parliament: North Norfolk

Hanworth is a village and a civil parish in the English county of Norfolk. It is 18.8 miles (30.3 km) north of Norwich, 5.4 miles (8.7 km) south-west of Cromer and 133 miles (214 km) north-east of London. The nearest railway station is Gunton on a branch line, the Bittern Line, between Norwich and Sheringham. In 2001 and 2011 the parish had a population of 169. The primary local authorities are North Norfolk and for education, social care and much infrastructure Norfolk County Council.

== History ==
Hanworth's name is of Anglo-Saxon origin and derives from the Old English for "Hagena's enclosure".

Hanworth has an entry in the Domesday Book of 1086. In the great book, Hanworth is recorded by the name Hagan(a)worda and the main landholder is Roger Bigot. The survey also mentions that there were two mills, 8 beehives, 5 cobs and 24 cattle.

=== Tudor period ===
Through most of the Tudor period (at least from the accession of Henry VIII in 1509) the principal landowners of the parish were the Doughty family. The family home, Hanworth Hall, was where they lived and were agricultural landlords until more distant heirs succeeded at the end of the 18th century. The hall was rebuilt after a fire in 1686. In the park (proper demesne itself) is a notable Spanish chestnut tree believed to pre-date 1714.

== Church of Saint Bartholomew ==
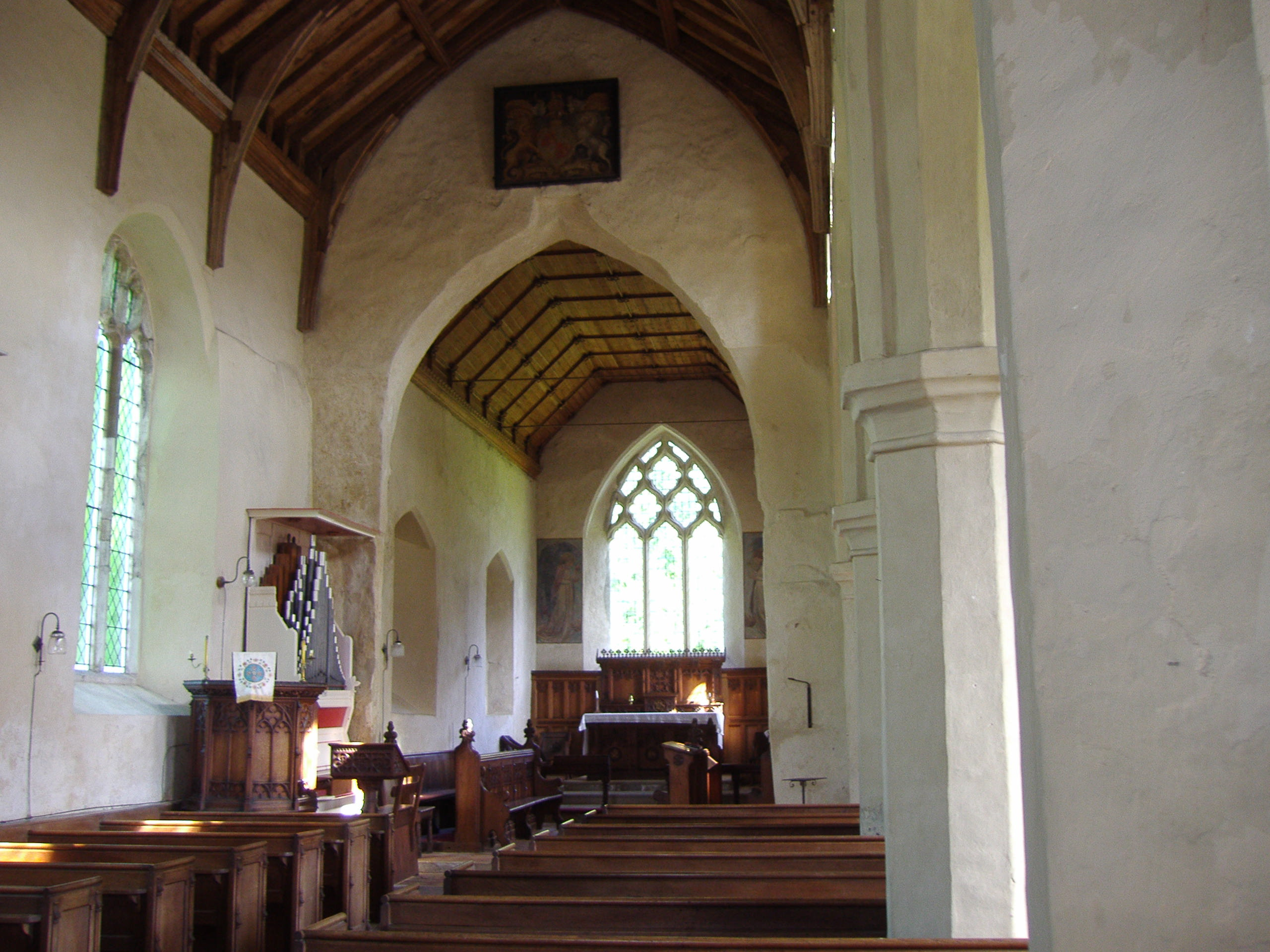
The Interior of the parish church

The parish church of Saint Bartholomew dates from the 14th century, but parts of the building are remnants of an earlier building. On the outside north wall of the chancel, there are traces of Saxon windows. On the eastern elevation, the east window dates from between 1290 and 1350. The nave and south aisles are of a later date. The windows are Perpendicular in style and date from between 1350 and 1530, and small pieces of medieval stained glass can be seen in the top lights. The clerestory has an unusual arrangement of two windows to each arch. The tower is constructed from flint and has traceried sound holes; it was built in the 15th century. The tower has a peal of five bells. The font dates from before the present church and has a large bowl supported by four plain pillars. Hanging over the chancel arch there are the royal arms of Queen Anne (1702–1714) which were adopted by the Crown after the union of England and Scotland in 1707. The church organ was built around 1865 by 'Father' Henry Willis, the famous London organ builder. It originally cost £70 and is the only miniature Father Willis organ in Norfolk.

== Common ==
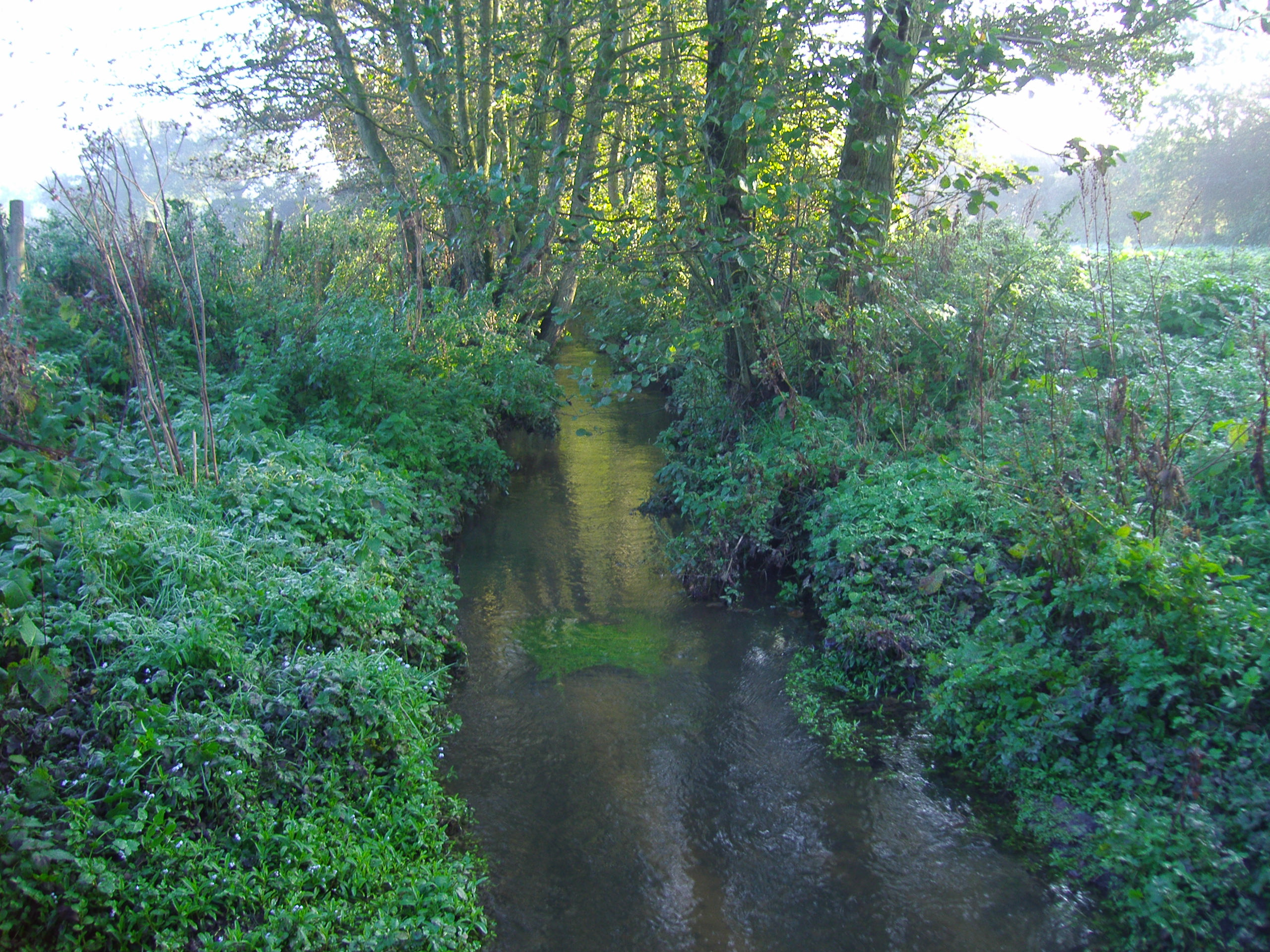
Scarrow Beck on Hanworth Common

Hanworth Common lies between Cromer and Aylsham in North Norfolk. The name is derived from Hagana (the Dane who invaded Norfolk in 870 AD, and whose name was anglicised to Han), and 'worth' meaning waters, which relates to the two streams that enclose the parish: Hagon Beck and Scarrow Beck. The Weavers' Way from Cromer to Great Yarmouth runs through the village.

The common covers 35 acres (14 ha) protected by cattle grids; it is relatively large for East Anglia and is one of few that survive in the ownership of all of the residents of a zone, apart from a few National Parks and Areas of Outstanding Natural Beauty, such as the New Forest.

The first maps of Hanworth Common go back to 1628, when the Doughty family bought the Manor of Hanworth from the Duke of Norfolk. They bought more land from his kinsman the Earl of Surrey (a junior branch of the Howard family) in 1690. At the time, there were three commons (Bell House Common, Hook Hill Common and Barn Stable Common) which together made up Hanworth Green.

The common has been managed (including letting of the grazing) by a committee of residents since at least 1909, the earliest minutes that are held. In 1972, Hanworth Common was registered under the Commons Registration Act 1965; as there was no known owner, possessory title was granted to the Hanworth Commons Management Committee in 1974. About 30 cattle now graze the common from May to October.

In late 2004, Robert, the youngest son of Anthony Philip Harbord-Hamond, 11th Baron Suffield, claimed ownership of the common and tried to charge the owners of animals grazing there. In October 2006 a court rejected this, and ruled that the land belonged to the people of the village by virtue of adverse possession.

== Historic economic demography ==
The parish had less than 1,500 acres (6.1 km^{2}) until 1935, when the former civil parish of Gunton was merged with Hanworth and the census records an increase of 943 acres (3.82 km^{2}).

At decennial censuses from 1801 to 1851 the population hovered between 246 and 267 inhabitants, but after that the population was significantly fewer. Figures can appear confusing due to an acreage gain (see above); comparing like with like, the population fell from a nominal 282 as of 1931 (including the area gained) to 250 in 1951, then again fell sharply to 196 in 1961.

In the early 19th century professional artists (including Humphry Repton and John Sell Cotman) came to paint Hanworth Common. It hosted many businesses: a dressmaker, stonemason, blacksmith and wood carver. The blacksmiths was destroyed by a Luftwaffe bomb in 1940, the year of the Battle of Britain.

== Governance ==
Hanworth is part of the electoral ward of Erpingham for local elections and is part of the district of North Norfolk.

The village's national constituency is North Norfolk, which has been represented by the Liberal Democrat Steff Aquarone MP since 2024.

== War Memorial ==
Hanworth has two war memorials, a set of marble plaques in St. Bartholomew's Church and a set of wooden plaques in the nearby Memorial Hall. The memorials list the following names for the First World War:

Rank	Name	Unit	Date of death	Burial/Commemoration
LCpl.	Bertie J. Newstead	8th Bn., Norfolk Regiment	1 Jul. 1916	Thiepval Memorial
Pte.	Claud E. Stone	11th Bn., Essex Regiment	6 May 1917	Philosophe Cemetery
Pte.	Albert Harrison	4th Bn., Leicestershire Regiment	22 Nov. 1917	Philosophe Cemetery
Rfn.	Richard A. Howard	2/5th (Rifles) Bn., London Regiment	16 Aug. 1917	Menin Gate

The following names were added after the Second World War:

Rank	Name	Unit	Date of death	Burial/Commemoration
PO	James A. Barclay	No. 18 (Bomber) Squadron RAF	8 Dec. 1941	Runnymede Memorial
Sgt.	Kenneth S. Chalmers	No. 207 (Bomber) Squadron RAF	17 Oct. 1942	St. Bartholomew's Cyd.
Sgt.	Victor D. Gee	No. 219 (Coastal) Squadron RAF	21 Mar. 1941	St. Bartholomew's Cyd.
Gnr.	Bernard J. Green	61 L.A.A. Regt., Royal Artillery	10 Aug. 1943	Benghazi War Cemetery
