= Felbrigg Hall =

Country house in Norfolk, England

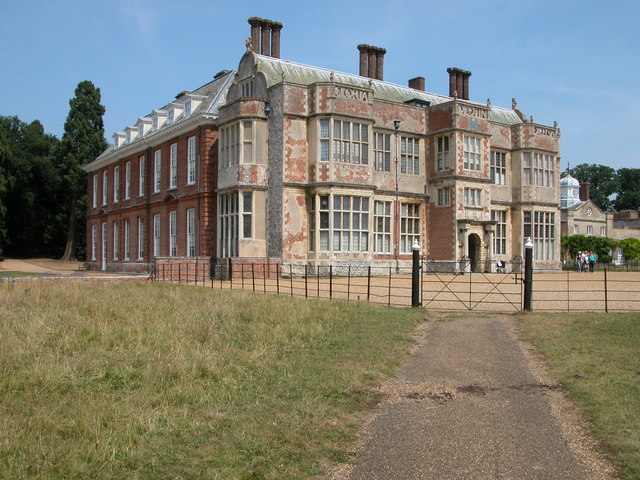
- View of Felbrigg Hall from the south, showing the Jacobean east wing, c. 1624 (right) and the west wing, c. 1680 (left)

- Location within Norfolk

General information
- Type: Stately home
- Location: Near Felbrigg village, South West of Cromer, Norfolk
- Coordinates: 52.9074°N 1.2593°E
- Completed: Built in the 17th century
- Owner: in the care of the National Trust

Website
- https://www.nationaltrust.org.uk/felbrigg-hall

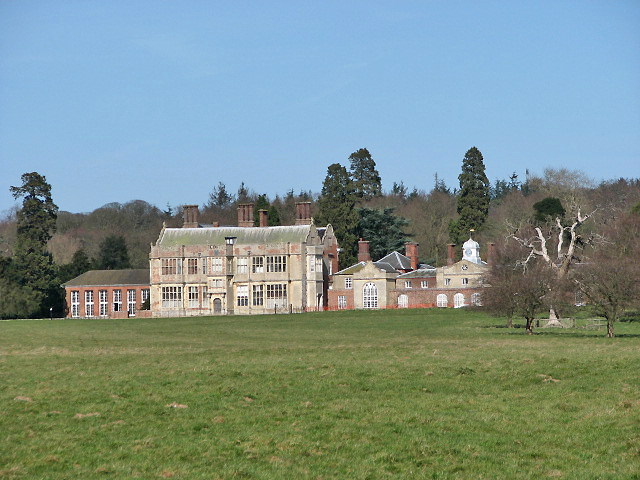
Felbrigg Hall, Jacobean wing, circa 1624

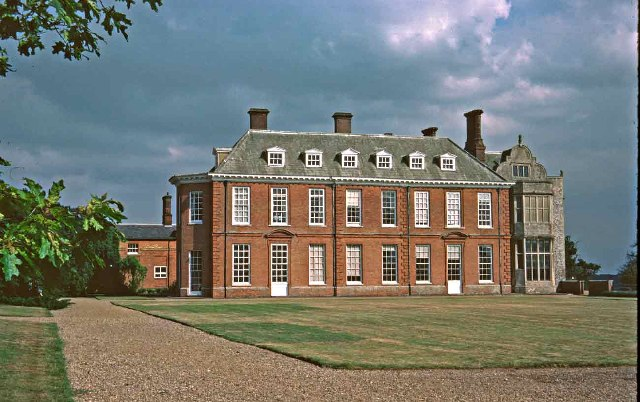
Felbrigg Hall, west wing, circa 1680

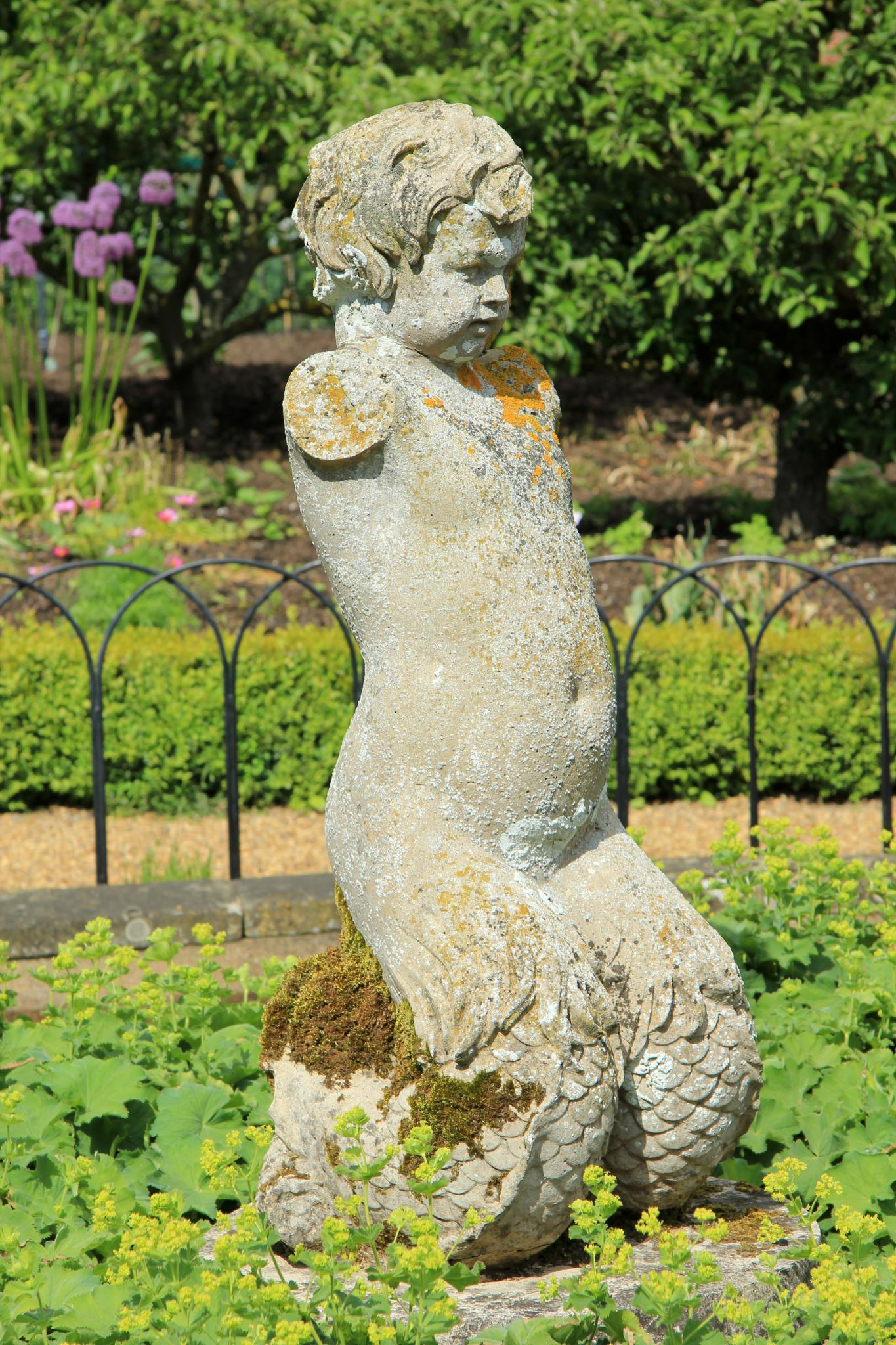
One of Felbrigg's garden ornaments

Felbrigg Hall is a 17th-century English country house near the village of that name in Norfolk. Part of a National Trust property, the unaltered 17th-century house is noted for its Jacobean architecture and fine Georgian interior. Outside is a walled garden, an orangery and orchards. The house and grounds were bequeathed to the National Trust in 1969 by Robert Ketton-Cremer. The hall is Grade I on the National Heritage List for England. Most of the grounds are part of Felbrigg Woods, a Site of Special Scientific Interest.

== History ==
The estate originated with the Felbrigg family. It passed to John Wyndham (died 1475) and remained in that family for centuries.

Thomas Wyndham (died 1522) was a councillor to King Henry VIII. Later, residents included John Wyndham (1558–1645) who was probably the builder of Felbrigg Hall. The last Wyndham or Windham of Felbrigg was William Wyndham (died 1810). Much land had been added to the medieval estate in the 17th and 18th centuries. Above the entablature the family arms and the projecting bays bear the words GLORIA DEO IN EXCELSIS in pierced stone, surmounted by heraldic beasts.

The last owner of the house, before it passed into National Trust ownership, was Robert Wyndham Ketton-Cremer. His heir, his brother Richard, was killed in action in the Second World War. Robert's memorial to Richard is in the woods behind the house.

Robert Wyndham Ketton-Cremer wrote a number of books, particularly about Norfolk, including Felbrigg: the Story of a House, and Norfolk in the Civil War, Faber, 1969. Robert Ketton-Cremer never married, and with no heirs, left the estate to the National Trust on his death in 1969. Part of the estate was acquired by Beeston Hall School.

Christopher Mackie was the administrator, or houseman, of Felbrigg Hall until 1990. His wife Mary Mackie wrote three books on their experiences there: Cobwebs and Cream Teas, Dry Rot and Daffodils and Frogspawn and Floor Polish.

== Today ==
Today the Felbrigg estate covers approximately 1,760 acres (about 7 km^{2}) of parkland including the 520-acre (2.1 km^{2}) Great Wood, which shelters the house. There is public access to the grounds along a number of waymarked walks through the estate, including the Weavers' Way long-distance footpath. National Cycle Network regional routes 33 and 30 also pass through the estate.

In July 2026, the property closed for a short time following the death of a man in his 70s on the estate. The man was trampled by cattle whilst walking in parkland on the Felbrigg Estate and later passed away from his injuries. The grounds re-opened to the public two days after the incident.

== The gardens ==
Felbrigg garden is laid out in two different styles. The west garden is laid out in the style of a typical Victorian pleasure ground, arranged around an 18th-century orangery. Accentuating the play between light and shade, its formal lawns are interspersed with areas of dark shrubbery. This garden features a number of specimens from North America including red oaks, western red cedars, and a meadow with a walled garden. There are double borders of mixed shrubs, a herbaceous border, and more. The orchard has been planted with varieties of fruit known to have grown in the garden during the 19th century. The gardens are home to the National Collection of colchicums.

The gardens are Grade II* listed on the Register of Historic Parks and Gardens and Felbrigg Woods is a Site of Special Scientific Interest.

== National Trust controversy ==
To mark the 50th anniversary of the decriminalisation of sexual activity between men in England and Wales, the National Trust in summer 2017 organised a "Prejudice and Pride" campaign highlighting the LGBT themes in its properties. At Felbrigg Hall, a short film narrated by Stephen Fry stated that Robert Wyndham Ketton-Cremer had been widely known to be homosexual, though others claimed that this was only known by his close friends. Two of Ketton-Cremer's godchildren criticised the decision, claiming that a public outing would have been against Ketton-Cremer's wishes and accusing the Trust of using their godfather to generate publicity.

The Trust also requested that volunteers wear a badge featuring the charity's logo atop the colours of the LGBT pride flag. Of the house's 350 volunteers, ten refused and were asked to take backstage roles during the campaign. Sections of the press called on the Trust to reverse its decision, and some members cancelled their membership over the issue. The Trust subsequently U-turned on the wearing of badges.

== See also ==
- St Margaret's Church, Felbrigg
- William Frederick Windham
