= William Windham (Liberal politician) =

British Member of Parliament (1802–1854)

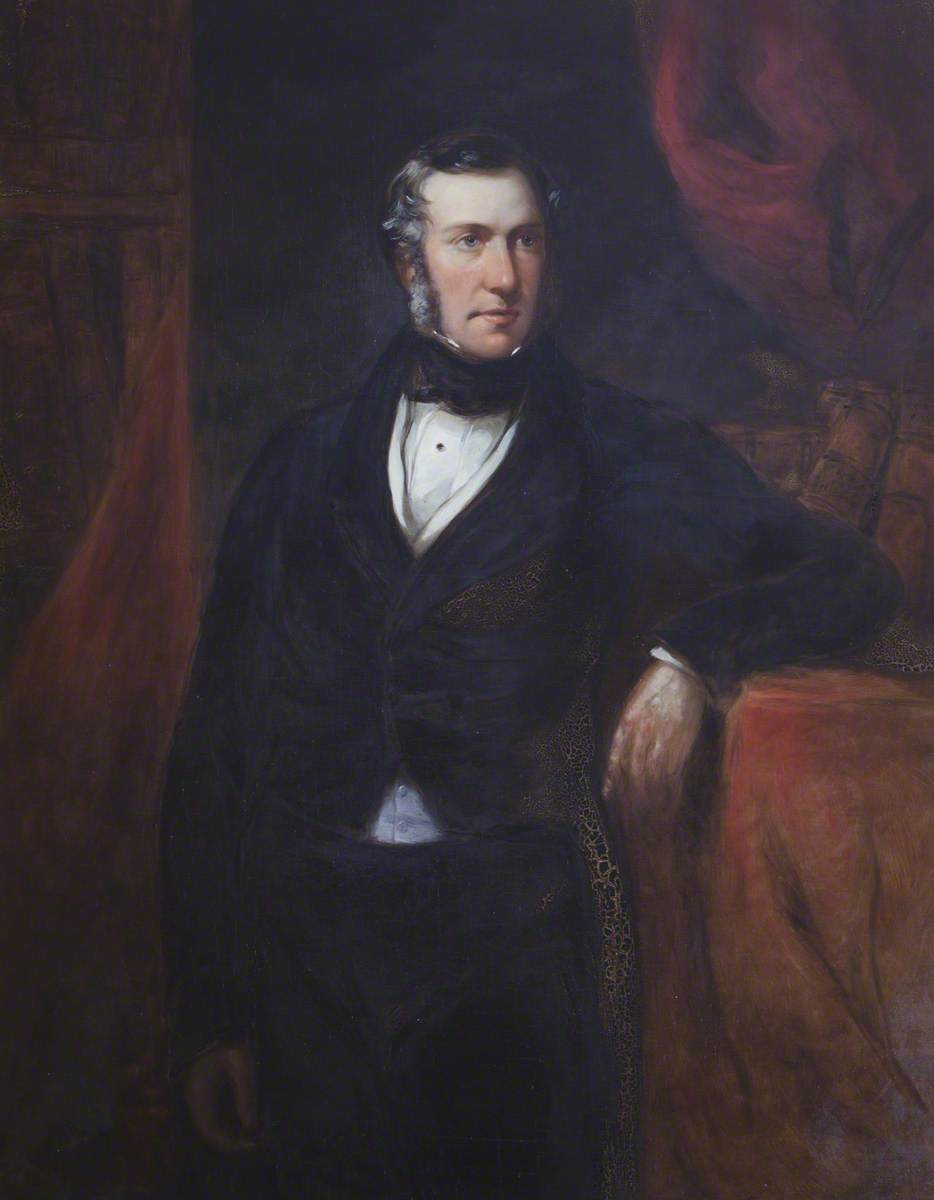
William Howe Windham (1802–1854)

William Howe Windham (30 March 1802 – 22 December 1854) was the son of Vice-Admiral William Lukin Windham, and a British Member of Parliament. He lived at Felbrigg Hall.

He represented the constituency of East Norfolk 1832–1835 as a Liberal, but was defeated at the elections of 1835 and 1837. He was also High Sheriff of Norfolk in 1842. He married Lady Sophia Hervey, daughter of Frederick Hervey, 1st Marquess of Bristol, by whom he had one son; William Frederick Windham (1840–1866) who was the subject of a notorious lunacy case.

Parliament of the United Kingdom
Constituency created	Member of Parliament for East Norfolk; 1832–1835; With: Hon. George Keppel	Succeeded by Edmond Wodehouse; Lord Walpole
Honorary titles
Preceded by Sir John Buxton	High Sheriff of Norfolk; 1842	Succeeded by William Tyssen
