= Agatha Christie indult =

Permission granted in 1971 by Pope Paul VI

The Agatha Christie indult is a nickname applied to the permission granted in 1971 by Pope Paul VI for the use of the Tridentine Mass in England and Wales. Indult is a term from Catholic canon law referring to a permission to do something that would otherwise be forbidden, while Agatha Christie was an English writer who was one of the many famous signatories of the petition for the canon law.

== Description ==
Following the introduction of the Mass of Paul VI to replace the Tridentine Mass in 1969–1970, a petition was sent to the Pope asking that the Tridentine form of the Roman Rite be permitted to continue for those who wished in England and Wales. Some English Catholics had an attachment to the Tridentine Mass, as it was the form celebrated by the Catholic Martyrs of the English Reformation, and by priests in periods when Catholicism was subjected to sometimes severe persecution. Moreover, the petition noted the exceptional artistic and cultural heritage of the Tridentine Mass, and was signed by many prominent non-Catholic figures in British society, including Agatha Christie, Vladimir Ashkenazy, Kenneth Clark, Robert Graves, F. R. Leavis, Cecil Day-Lewis, Nancy Mitford, Iris Murdoch, Yehudi Menuhin, Joan Sutherland, as well as two Anglican bishops, those of Exeter and of Ripon.

Cardinal John Carmel Heenan, Archbishop of Westminster approached Pope Paul VI with the petition and asked that use of the Tridentine Mass be permitted, and the Pope approved the request on 5 November 1971. Supposedly, the Pope had read the letter and exclaimed in excitement, “Ah! Agatha Christie!”, and so decided to grant it, thus giving the indult its nickname. Between then and Pope John Paul II’s worldwide indult in 1984, the Bishops of England and Wales were allowed to grant permission for occasional celebrations of Mass in the Old Rite, with the modifications introduced in 1965 and 1967.

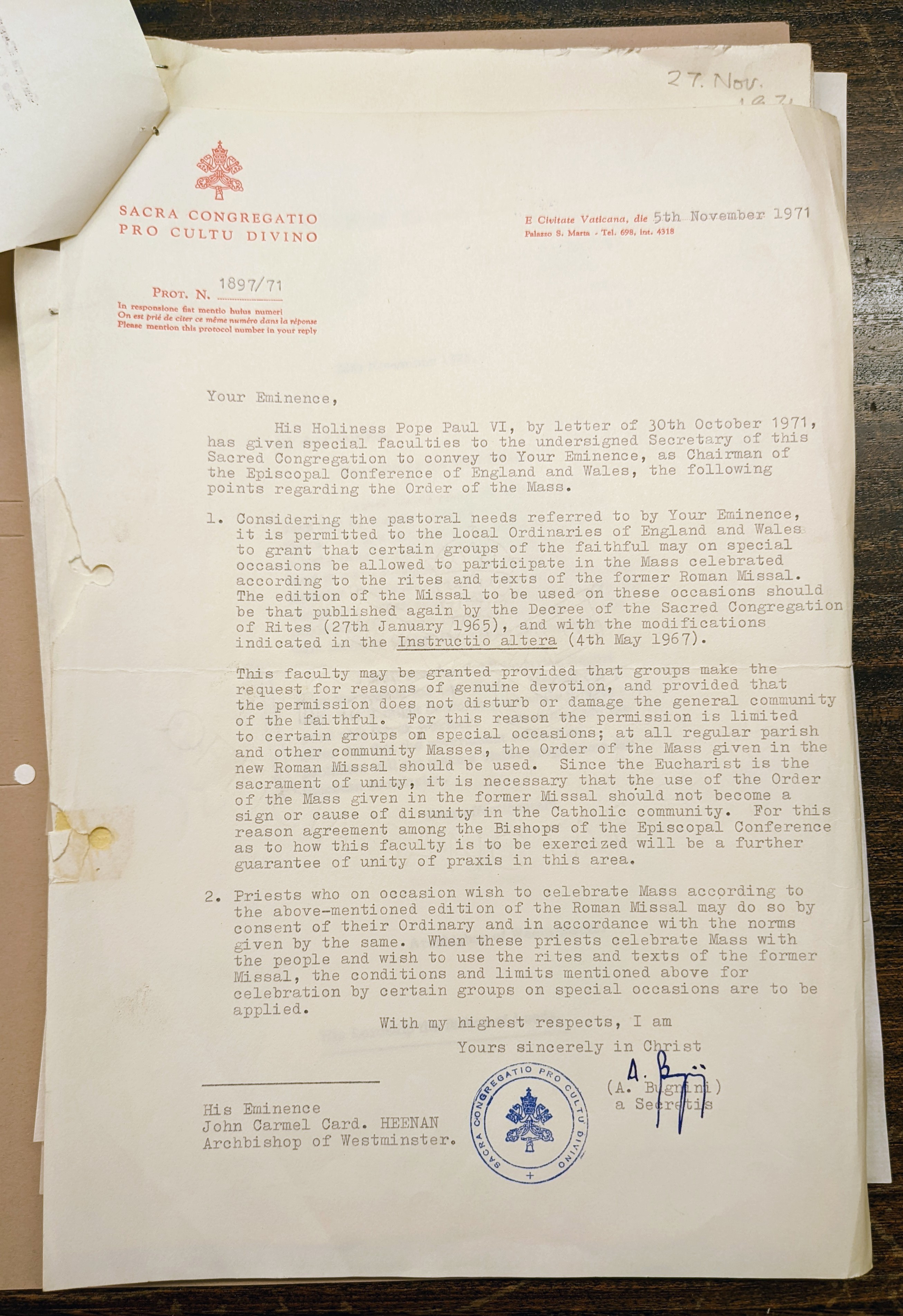
Letter from S.C.D.W., Nov. 5, 1971, Protocol 1897/71, signed by A. Bugnini

== Signatories of the original appeal ==
The following were signatories of the original petition to Pope Paul VI:

- Harold Acton
- Vladimir Ashkenazy
- John Bayler
- Lennox Berkeley
- Maurice Bowra
- Agatha Christie
- Kenneth Clark
- Nevill Coghill
- Cyril Connolly
- Colin Davis
- Hugh Delargy
- Robert Exeter
- Miles Fitzalan-Howard
- Constantine FitzGibbon
- William Glock
- Magdalen Goffin
- Robert Graves
- Graham Greene
- Ian Greenlees
- Joseph Grimond
- Harman Grisewood
- Colin Hardie
- Rupert Hart-Davis
- Barbara Hepworth
- Auberon Herbert
- John Jolliffe
- David Jones
- Osbert Lancaster
- F. R. Leavis
- Cecil Day-Lewis
- Compton Mackenzie
- George Malcolm
- Max Mallowan
- Alfred Marnau
- Yehudi Menuhin
- Nancy Mitford
- Raymond Mortimer
- Malcolm Muggeridge
- Iris Murdoch
- John Murray
- Seán Ó Faoláin
- E. J. Oliver
- Oxford and Asquith
- William Plomer
- Kathleen Raine
- William Rees-Mogg
- Ralph Richardson
- John Ripon
- Charles Russell
- Rivers Scott
- Joan Sutherland
- Philip Toynbee
- Martin Turnell
- Bernard Wall
- Patrick Wall
- E. I. Watkin
- R. C. Zaehner

== See also ==
- Preconciliar rites after the Second Vatican Council
- Quattuor abhinc annos
