= Beeston Cliffs =

Biological and geological Site of Special Scientific Interest in Sheringham, Norfolk

Coordinates: 52.943°N 1.227°E

- Site of Special Scientific Interest
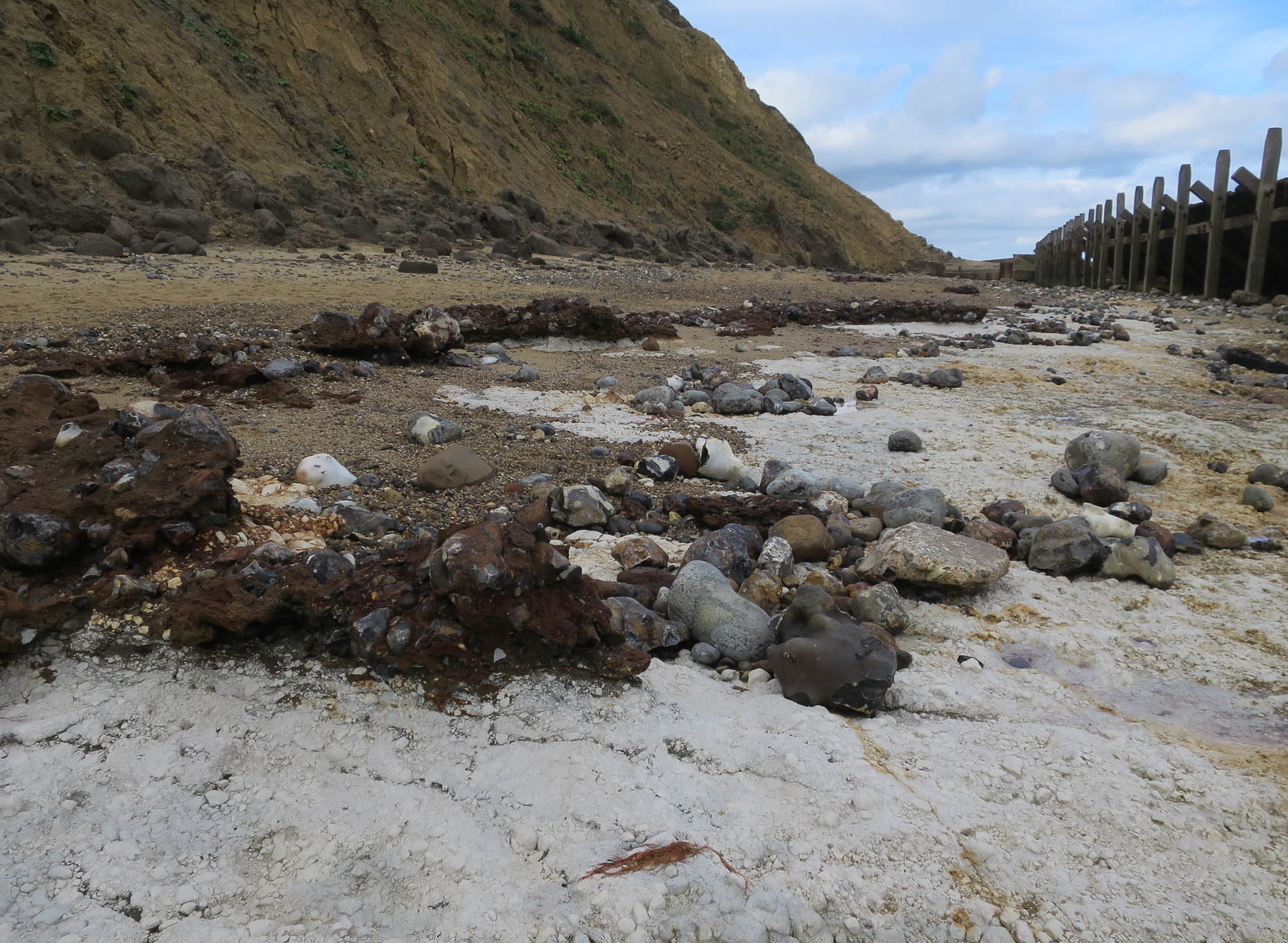
- Location of Beeston Cliffs.
- Area of search: Norfolk, England
- Grid reference: TG 169 433
- Interest: Biological; Geological
- Area: 10.3 hectares (25 acres)
- Notification date: 1985
- Location map: Magic Map

Beeston Cliffs is a 10.3-hectare (25-acre) biological and geological Site of Special Scientific Interest in Sheringham in Norfolk, England. It is a Geological Conservation Review site.

This is the type site for the Beestonian stage of the Early Pleistocene, between around 1.8 and 0.8 million years ago. It has both marine and freshwater deposits. There is a nationally rare plant, purple broomrape, in calcareous grassland on the clifftop.

There is public access to the site.

== Land ownership ==
All land within Beeston Cliffs SSSI is owned by the local authority
