= Sheringham =

Seaside town in Norfolk, England

Coordinates: 52.940°N 1.213°E

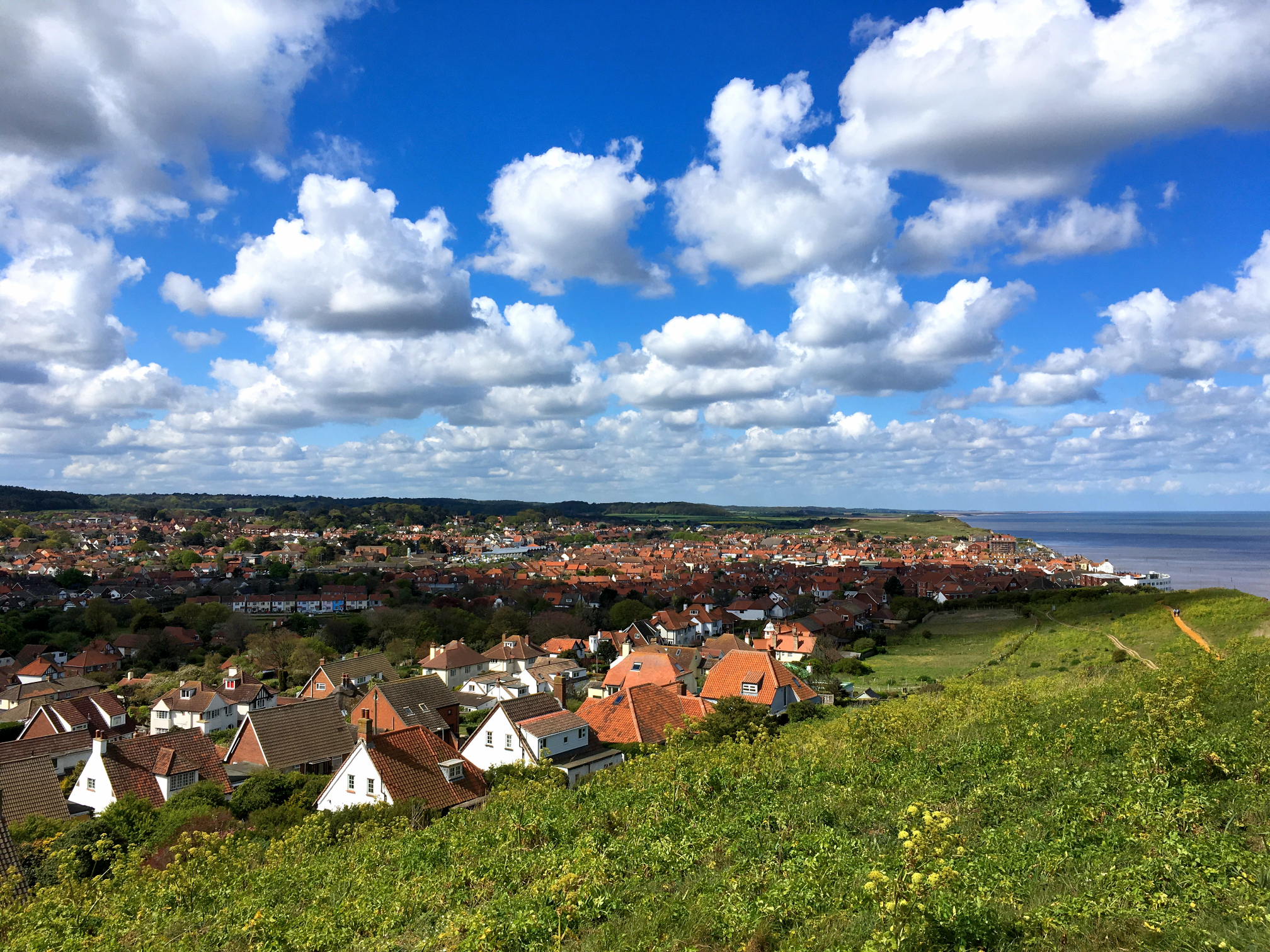
- View of Sheringham from Beeston Bump

- Location within Norfolk
- Area: 4 km^{2} (1.5 sq mi)
- Population: 7,367 (2011 census)
  - Density: 1,842/km^{2} (4,770/sq mi)
- OS grid reference: TG157430
- Civil parish: Sheringham
- District: North Norfolk
- Shire county: Norfolk
- Region: East
- Country: England
- Sovereign state: United Kingdom
- Post town: SHERINGHAM
- Postcode district: NR26
- Dialling code: 01263
- Police: Norfolk
- Fire: Norfolk
- Ambulance: East of England
- UK Parliament: North Norfolk

Sheringham (/ˈʃɛrɪŋəm/; population 7,367) is a seaside town and civil parish in the county of Norfolk, England. The motto of the town, granted in 1953 to the Sheringham Urban District Council, is Mare Ditat Pinusque Decorat, Latin for "The sea enriches and the pine adorns".

== History ==
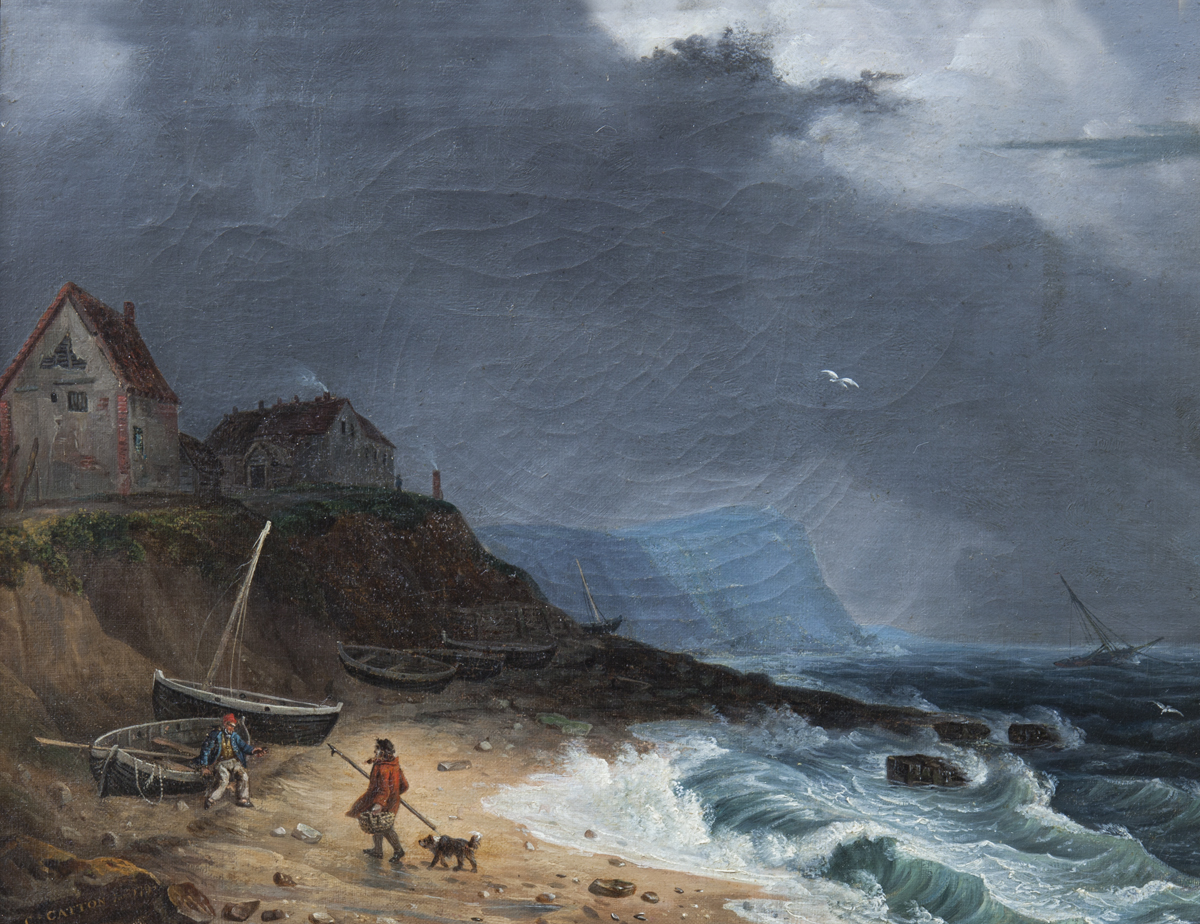
1794 painting of Sheringham beach by Charles Catton the younger

The place-name Sheringham is first attested in the Domesday Book of 1086, where it appears as Silingeham. It appears as Siringeham in 1174 and Scheringham in the Book of Fees (Liber feodorum) in 1242. The name means 'the homestead of Scira's people'.

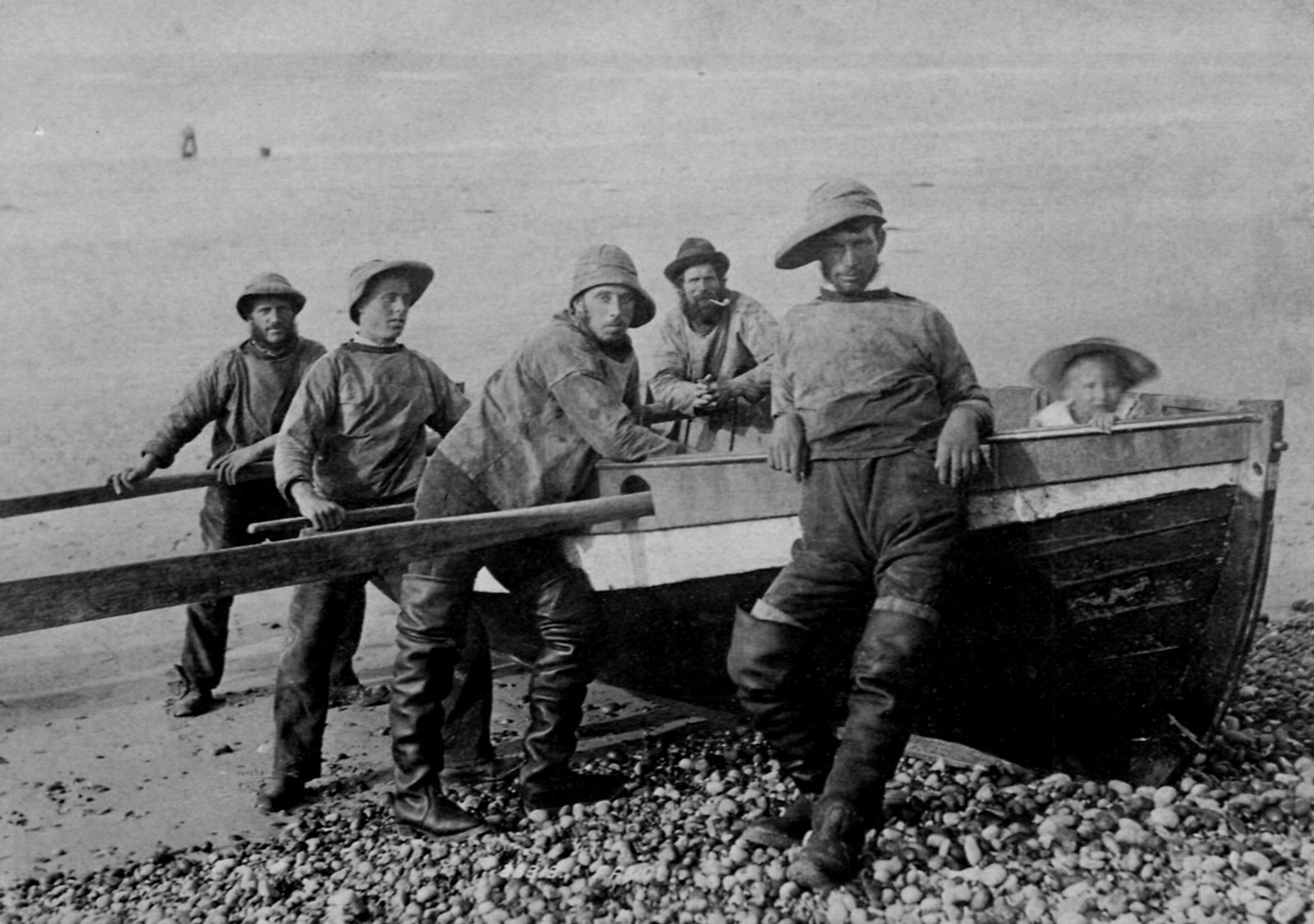
Sheringham (period 1850–98) by Francis Frith

Historically, the parish of Sheringham comprised the two villages of Upper Sheringham, a farming community, and Lower Sheringham, which combined farming with fishing.

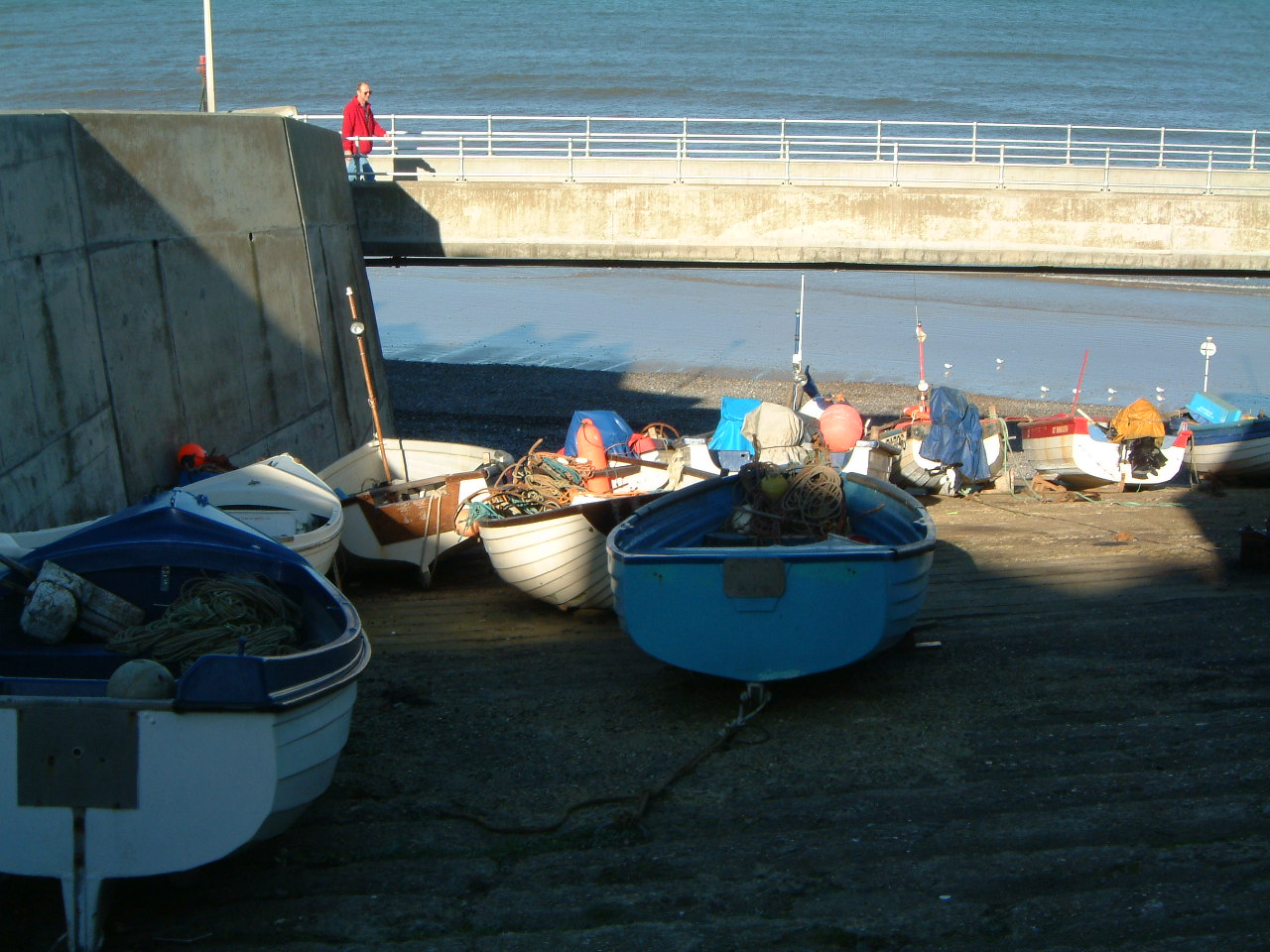
Sheringham slipway

The fishing industry was at its peak in the late 19th and early 20th centuries, as the coming of the railways made it possible for fish to be transported more efficiently to market. Through the 1900s, the focus of the fishing, as all along the north Norfolk coast, began to be on crabs, lobsters and whelks. The local fishermen were major suppliers of crabs and lobsters to the London fish markets. Long lining for cod and the catching of herring began to become less important in the second half of the century, as did whelking. Today, from a peak of maybe 200 boats, Sheringham has eight boats operated single-handed.

The current town of Sheringham was once Lower Sheringham, a fishing station for the main village, now known as Upper Sheringham. It is a railway town that was developed with the coming of the Midland and Great Northern Joint Railway line in the late 19th century. Most of Sheringham's range of buildings and shops come from this period and the early 20th century. It has a particularly interesting range of buildings using flint, not normally in the traditional Norfolk style but in a variety of techniques. Sheringham Town Hall, the former headquarters of Sheringham Urban District Council, was completed in 1912.

In the First World War, Sheringham was struck by two bombs dropped by the German Imperial Navy Zeppelin L 4 (LZ 27) at approximately 20:30 and 20:45 GMT on 19 January 1915, making it the first place in Britain to be attacked from the air by a Zeppelin. The first bomb, which fell on Jordan's Yard, Wyndham Street (now Whitehall Yard), failed to explode. A resident reportedly picked it up and placed it in a bucket. No casualties were reported. Zeppelin L 4 then continued its raid westward, bombing other coastal towns along the North Norfolk coast.

== The town today ==
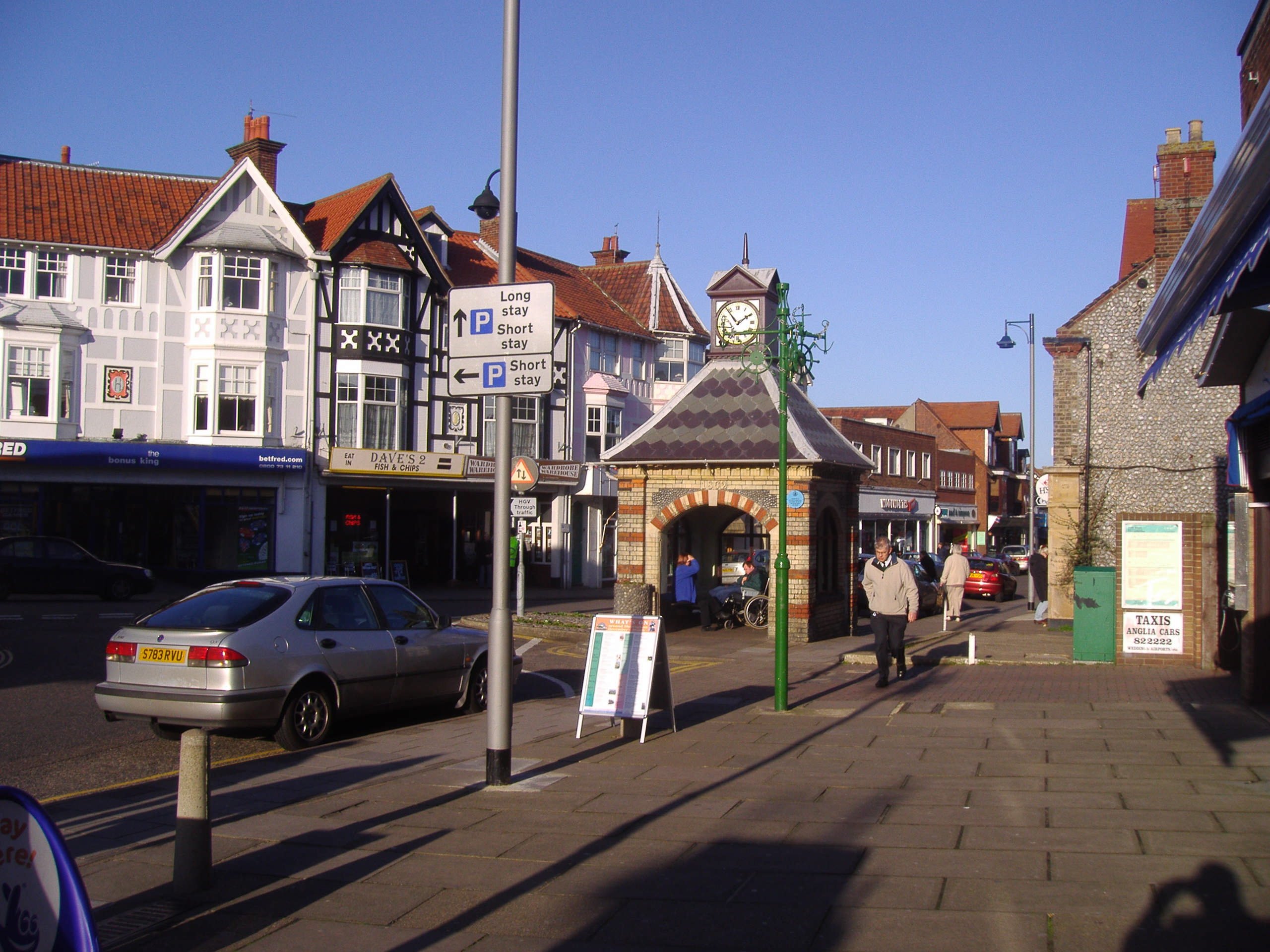
Town centre

Sheringham town centre is centred on a traditional high street with a wide range of privately owned shops. On Saturdays throughout the year, there is a popular market in the car park next to the railway station which attracts large crowds even out of the holiday season. The town also has a good selection of specialist shops such as second-hand books, antiques and bric-a-brac, fishing tackle and bait, a computer shop, a model shop, and arts and craft shops. The Sheringham Little Theatre has a wide range of productions on throughout the year including a well-established summer repertory season running from July to September, and a popular pantomime at Christmas; in the foyer is a coffee shop with display of art by local artists. There is a selection of food outlets, pubs, restaurants and a youth hostel.

On 15 October 2010, Tesco won a 14-year battle to open a store in the town. In a split vote, North Norfolk District Council development committee chairman Simon Partridge used his casting vote in favour of the scheme. The store finally opened on 24 October 2013.

An annual Cromer and Sheringham Crab/Lobster festival is held in May, and the town's Carnival is held at the beginning of August.

Otterndorf Green is a small green space between the town's railway stations. It commemorates Sheringham's twinning with the German town of Otterndorf.

The Church of England Parish Church of St Peter was consecrated in 1897.

== Sheringham Museum ==
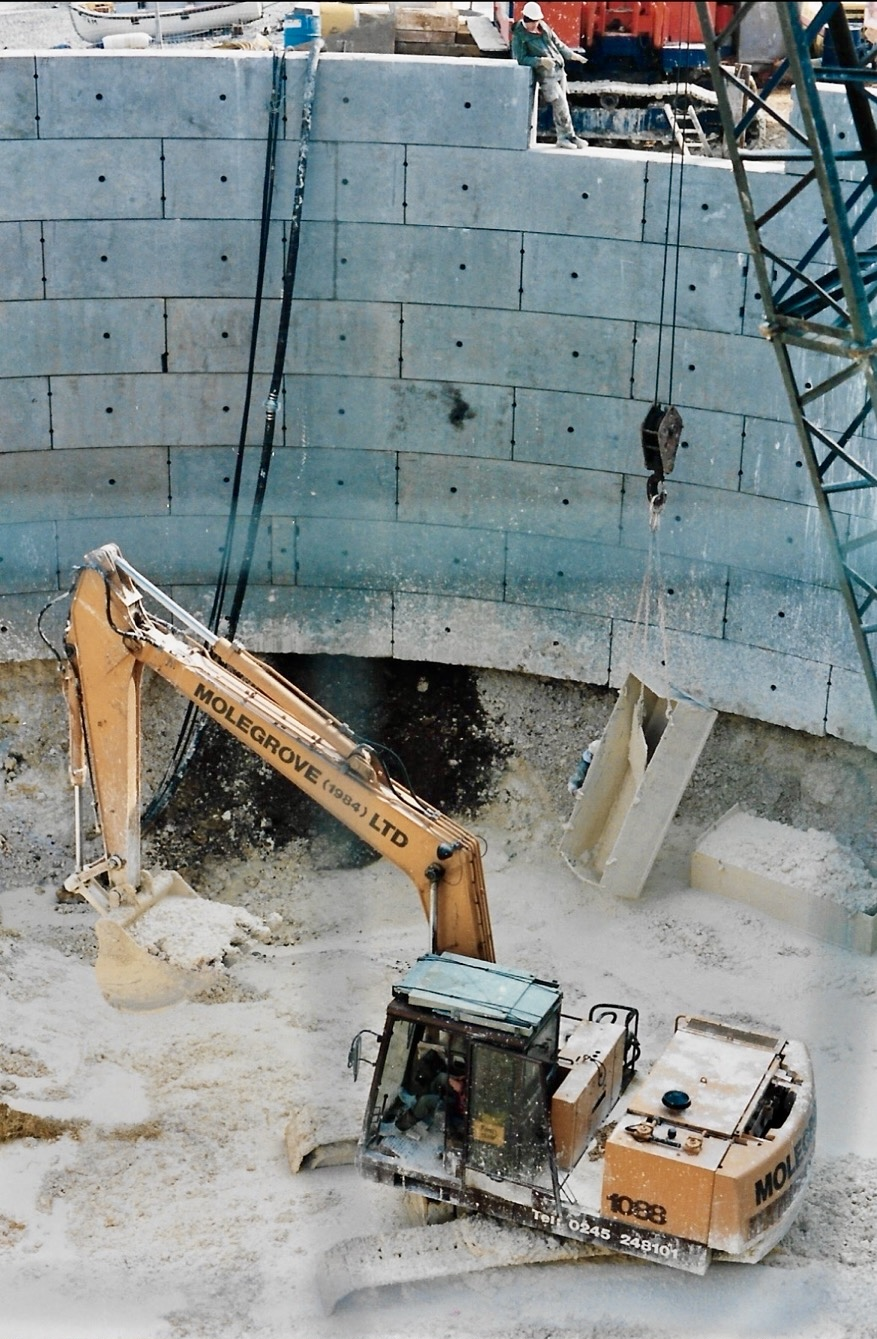
Construction of storm water tank at The Mo Sheringham 1993

The town's museum, now known as The Mo, includes a collection of old lifeboats, various displays, a viewing tower and houses the Sheringham Shoal Offshore Wind Farm visitor centre.

== Lifeboats ==
Sheringham is reputed to be the only place in the world to have four of its original lifeboats. The Sheringham Museum Trust owns three of these:

- JC Madge (1904–36), pulling and sailing
- Foresters Centenary (1936–61), the town's first motorised lifeboat
- Manchester Unity of Oddfellows (1961–90), an Oakley Class lifeboat, Sheringham's last offshore boat

Within the next two to three years Sheringham Museum Trust plans to have an extended museum to house this unique collection together with three crab boats and general lifeboat and fishing industry ephemera. The town has no harbour, so the lifeboat has to be launched by tractor, and the fishing boats are hauled up the beach. An old sail-powered lifeboat is preserved in the former lifeboat shed and the three other preserved RNLI lifeboats are kept in another centre.

== Transport ==
=== Railway ===
Sheringham railway station is the northern terminus of the Bittern Line, the National Rail route to Cromer and Norwich. Services run generally hourly and are operated by Greater Anglia.

The station has a basic single platform structure that was opened in January 1967, following the closure of the original and more substantial station close by; the platform was rebuilt in 2019, to accommodate the new Class 755 trains which now operate the route.

==== Heritage ====
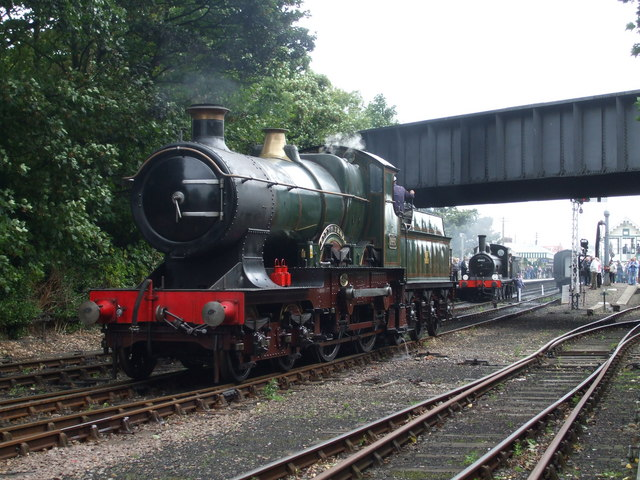
The preserved North Norfolk Railway

The line beyond the National Rail station has been preserved as the North Norfolk Railway, also known as the Poppy Line. It operates between Sheringham's original station and a new station at Holt, via Weybourne. The railway operates primarily with steam and diesel-hauled trains, with some diesel multiple units.

The short link between the National Rail network and the North Norfolk Railway was re-established in 2010; the first train to use the link was hauled by 70013 Oliver Cromwell.

=== Buses ===
Local bus services are provided by Sanders Coaches. The primary X40, X44 and 44A services run regularly between Sheringham, Cromer, Aylsham and Norwich. Routes also operate to other local destinations including Fakenham, Holt and Wells-next-the-Sea.

=== Roads ===
Both the A148 and A149 connect King's Lynn and Cromer. The former takes a route through Fakenham, by-passing the southern part of Sheringham, and the latter takes a coastal route via Hunstanton.

== Schools ==
Sheringham has three schools: Woodfields (for disabled children), Sheringham High School and Sheringham Community Primary School.

== Media ==
Local television news programmes are BBC Look East on BBC One and ITV News Anglia on ITV1.

Local radio stations are BBC Radio Norfolk on 95.6 FM, Heart East on 102.4 FM, Greatest Hits Radio East (formerly North Norfolk Radio) on 103.2 FM, and Poppyland Community Radio, a community online based station which broadcast from the town.

The town is served by local newspapers: North Norfolk News and Eastern Daily Press.

== Places of worship ==
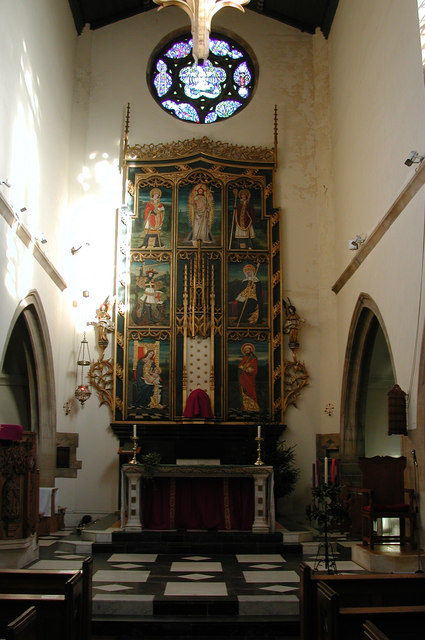
The east end of St Joseph's interior. The high altar is backed by a high and colourful reredos

The Roman Catholic Church of St Joseph, on Cromer Road was designed by Sir Giles Gilbert Scott. In 1901, a donation of over £3,000 by Catherine Deterding, the wife of the managing director and founder of the Shell Oil Company, enabled the purchase of land around an existing chapel to build a new church. Work began in 1902 and the first section, St Joseph's chapel was completed in 1908. In 1910, the second section opened, which comprises the sanctuary, nave and the porch. Later the church was completed by extending the nave and adding a new porch. The complete building was consecrated on 25 March 1935.

From the outside, it is possible to see the join between the northern two-thirds opened in 1910 and the southern extension completed in 1935. This large red-brick church towers over its neighbours. The north end, the liturgical east, has a high rose window, while each long side is pierced by three vast Perpendicular-style windows. The church is entered through a porch and into a narthex on the south west corner of the building. Behind a grilled area to the east there is a large framed icon of the Blessed Virgin. Inside the church, the height and narrowness emphasises the arcades which are also of a good height and have arches of alternate sizes. The décor is a mixture of both the arts and crafts movement and industrial Gothic, a signature of Gibert Scott's style. The font is a replica the seven sacraments font at St Mary and All Saints, Little Walsingham. There are some good pieces of early 20th century devotional art much of which was imported from the studio and workshop of Ferdinand Stuflesser in the Austrian Tyrol. There is a rood screen above the entrance to the sanctuary. The Stations of the Cross, ordered from Stuflesser, spent the First World War in the hold of a German freighter impounded at Genoa.

St Joseph's Catholic church

The Church of England Parish Church of St Peter was consecrated in 1897.

== War memorial ==
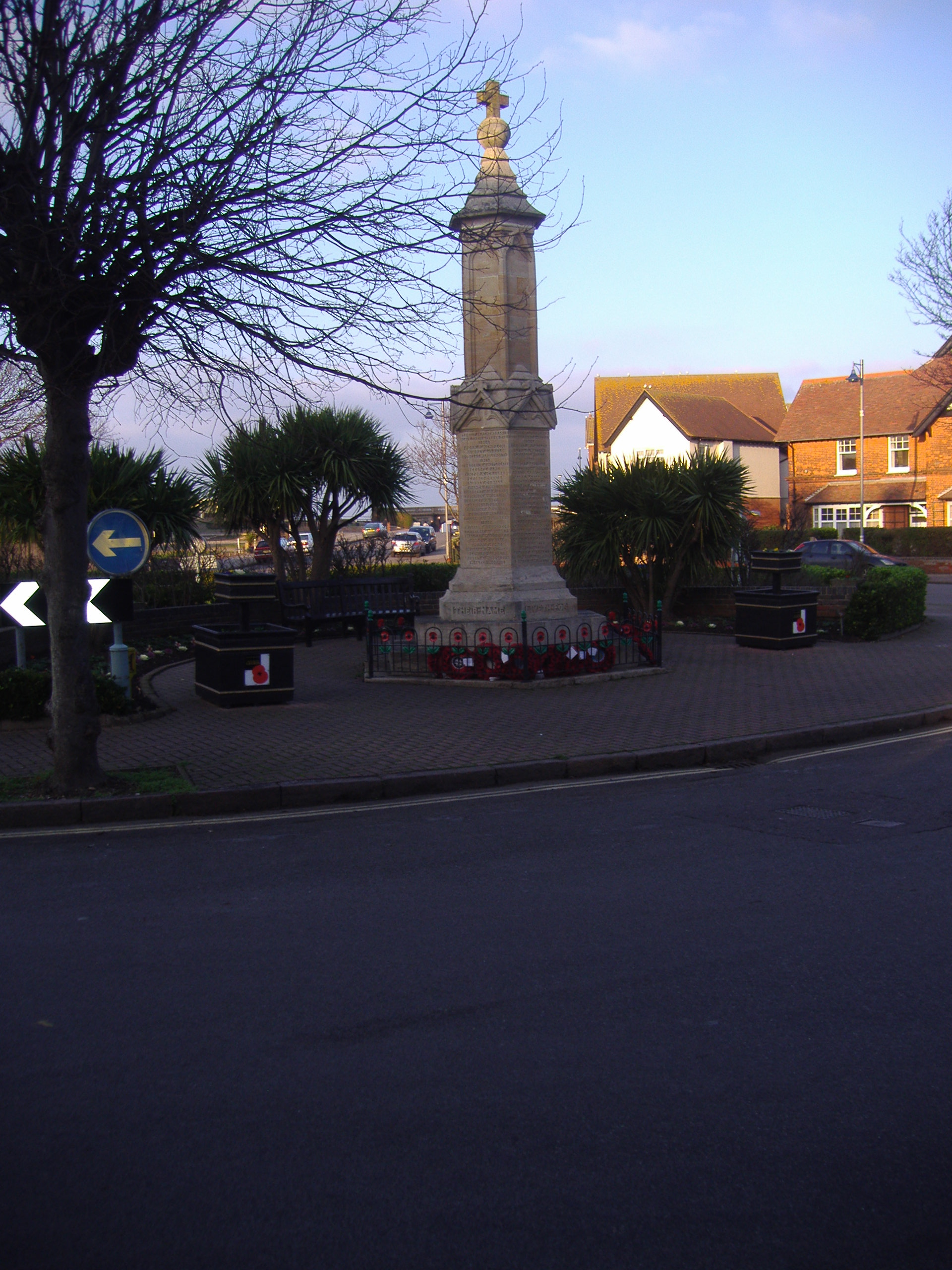
The war memorial

The memorial to the men and women of Sheringham and Beeston Regis who died in military service during the two world wars is located at grid reference TG155433 on the traffic island at the intersection of the Boulevard, St Nicholas Place and the Esplanade. It was designed by Herbert Palmer somewhat in the style of an Eleanor cross. It is of Clipsham stone and stands 26 feet (7.9 m) tall. It was unveiled on 1 January 1921. The names of the dead are on four panels that form the base of the cross. A recent addition to the memorial is a small wrought-iron fence around the base with poppy motifs. There are also further names on memorial boards in the nearby parish church of St Peter.

== Sheringham Hall and other prominent property ==
- In 1811, the Sheringham Estate was bought by Abbot and Charlotte Upcher. They asked Humphry Repton to design Sheringham Hall. The Upcher family also built a school. The Hall is still privately occupied, but the plantations of Sheringham Park are in the care of the National Trust and open to visitors.
- The Dales, formerly the residence of Henry Douglas King, MP, and later Major William James Spurrell, DSO, MC, is now a hotel (The Dales Country House).
- Sheringham watermill was known mainly as a papermill that operated from around 1750 to about 1865, although it quite possibly started life as a corn mill. It had an overshot waterwheel, which seems quite remarkable when considering the surrounding terrain and the fact that the mill was only supplied by the small Beeston Beck. A blue plaque on the wall of a cottage marks the location of the mill in Beeston road which was then called Paper Mill Road.
- The Masonic Hall on Cromer Road. Was once the Electric Picture Palace.

== Offshore wind farm ==
The town is also home to a large 317MW wind farm, the Sheringham Shoal Offshore Wind Farm, approximately 11 miles (18 km) to 14 miles (23 km) offshore.

== The Oddfellows Hall ==
The Oddfellows Hall on the Lifeboat Plain, built in 1867, was the original RNLI Lifeboat station and a gathering place for fishermen and boat builders, and has over the years been used as a craft centre, used to exhibit a model railway, and to display a model village. The hall was also used as a shoe factory. After years of standing idle, it reopened in October 2007 having been completely refurbished at a cost of £250,000. A collection of organisations such as East of England Development Agency, North Norfolk District Council, Sheringham plus Community Partnership and other interested parties worked together to facilitate the refurbishment of the hall and bring it back into community use.

== Beeston Bump ==
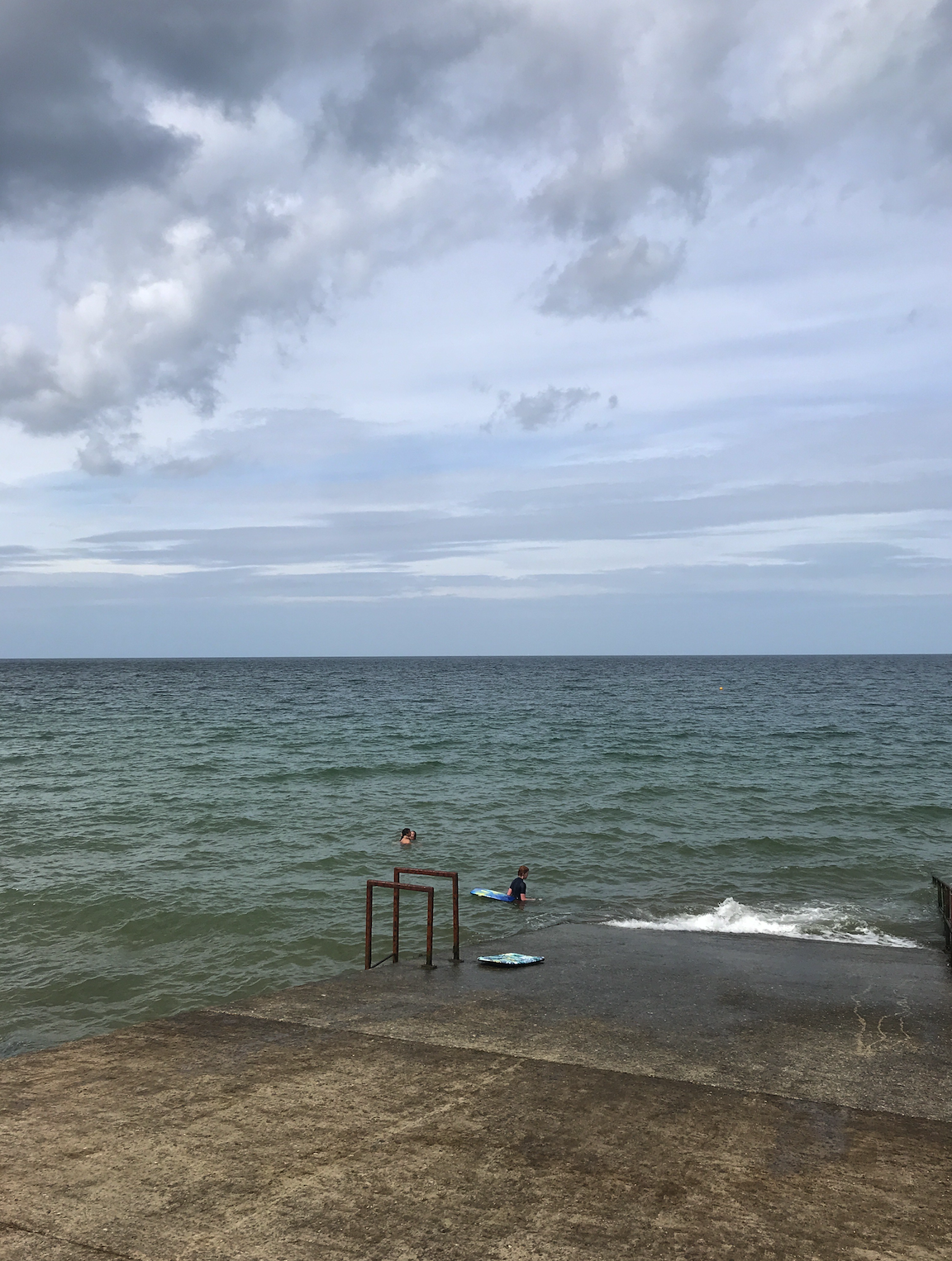
Sea swimmers on Sheringham seafront

Sheringham nestles under the nearby hill of Beeston Bump, a geological Site of Special Scientific Interest which was the site of one of the Second World War secret Y-stations. The Bump can be climbed using the Norfolk Coast Path from either the east or west. The Bump is a kame, a glacial deposit that began forming between 10,000 and 15,000 years ago at the end of the latest Ice Age. The huge mass of ice caused a depression in the land and, as the ice melted, the land mass began to 'spring' slowly back in a process called isostatic readjustment. This process still occurs in the UK, as Northern England is slowly rising.

== Sea defences ==
The northern frontage of Sheringham is protected by a concrete seawall which also serves as the promenade. It is a vital part of the protection of the town against the natural erosion that occurs along the North Norfolk coast. The storm surge of 1953 considerably damaged Sheringham's wooden sea defences. In front of the sea wall are groynes, armoured at their bases with large blocks of natural rock, which prevent long shore drift.

There are numerous drains along the frontage. To the east towards West Runton the seawall ends just below Beeston Bump. From there a timber revetment and groyne system, designed and constructed in 1976, runs eastwards for 2 km (just over a mile) to West Runton Gap. The shoreline management plans of the Department for Environment include a policy of managed retreat along this stretch of coast. The revetment between Sheringham and West Runton is no longer being maintained and is thus in a poor state of repair. Sections that become hazardous will be removed; the coastline will then be left to evolve naturally.

== Sport and leisure ==
Sheringham has a Non-League football club Sheringham F.C. which plays at Weybourne Road.

Sheringham Golf Club opened in 1891. It is located on town's western outskirts and is bounded by the North Sea and the North Norfolk Railway.

A modern sports and leisure complex, incorporating a swimming pool and gym, known as the Reef Leisure Centre, opened on Weybourne Road in late 2021, replacing the ageing Splash facility that had occupied the site.

In October 2016, it was announced a disused sewage outlet pipe stretching 50 metres (160 ft) from the beach into the sea will form the North Sea's "first snorkel trail".

== Notable people ==
- Tony Colman, Labour MP for Putney 1997–2005, born in Sheringham.
- Olive Edis had two photographic studios in the town and became Britain's first female WW1 war photographer.
- Magdalen Goffin (1925-2015), English writer, was born in Sheringham.
- Patrick Hamilton, writer, lived and died in a house called Martincross on the corner of the Boulevard and St Nicholas Place.
- Edward Ingram Watkin (1888–1981), English writer, lived in the town.
- Craig Murray, former British Ambassador to Uzbekistan, was born in neighbouring West Runton and brought up in Sheringham.
- Benjamin Pulleyne, Vicar of Sheringham 1825–1861, was also headmaster of Gresham's School.
- Ernest Shackleton lived at Martincross (then called Mainsail Haul) in July 1910, staying until April 1911.
- John Short Hewett, cleric and academic, was Vicar of Sheringham.
- Allan Smethurst (1927–2000), known as the "Singing Postman", brought up in Sheringham although born in Lancashire.
- Stephen Spender (1909–1995), English poet, novelist and essayist. Lived in a house called 'The Bluff' on the cliffs. He recalls Sheringham fondly in his autobiography World Within World.
- Ralph Vaughan Williams, composer, lived in Sheringham in 1919. He also lived and worked at Martincross, where he wrote A Sea Symphony.

== Twin towns ==
Sheringham is twinned with the towns of:

- Otterndorf, in the region of Lower Saxony, Germany, lies at the mouth of the River Medem on part of the Elbe delta in the district of Cuxhaven.
- Muzillac, in the region of Morbihan, Brittany, France.
