= Links Hotel, West Runton =

Hotel in West Runton, United Kingdom

The Links Hotel
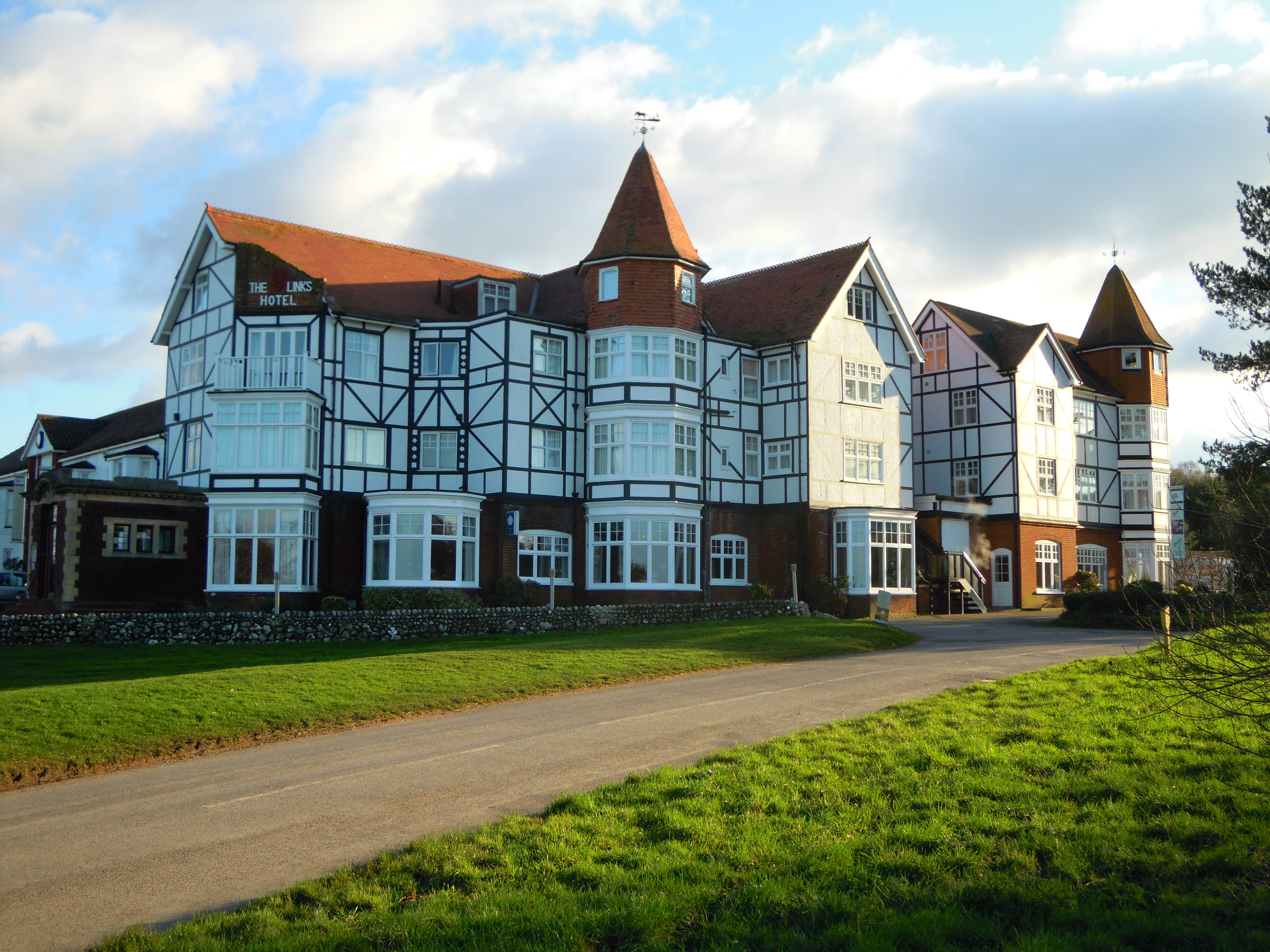
- The Links Hotel

- Norfolk
- Hotel chain: Mackenzie Hotels

General information
- Location: West Runton, North Norfolk, Norfolk, England, Station Road; West Runton; Cromer; Norfolk; NR27 9QH
- Coordinates: 52°56′2.67″N 1°14′47.10″E
- Opening: 1899

Other information
- Number of rooms: 49 en suite bedrooms
- Number of restaurants: 2 restaurant
- Number of bars: 3 bars
- Facilities: Indoor swimming pool 9 hole golf course Tennis court
- Parking: Yes

Website
- Hotel website

The Links Hotel is a 3-star hotel built in the Victorian era, located in the English seaside village of West Runton in the county of Norfolk, United Kingdom.

== Location ==
The Links is situated within 40 acres (16 ha) of coastal parkland and is surrounded by National Trust protected land and areas of outstanding beauty. It is a short distance south of the centre of the village of West Runton and its railway station. The nearest airport is in Norwich and is 21.1 miles (34.0 km) south of West Runton.

== History ==
The village became part of the rail network of Norfolk in 1892 when a railway station was built. Seeing the potential this event gave to the village, a local land owner called James Renwick Abbs decided to build a hotel in the village. The site he chose was only 200 yards from the new station. It opened for business in 1899 and then had 34 bedrooms.

=== Golf course ===
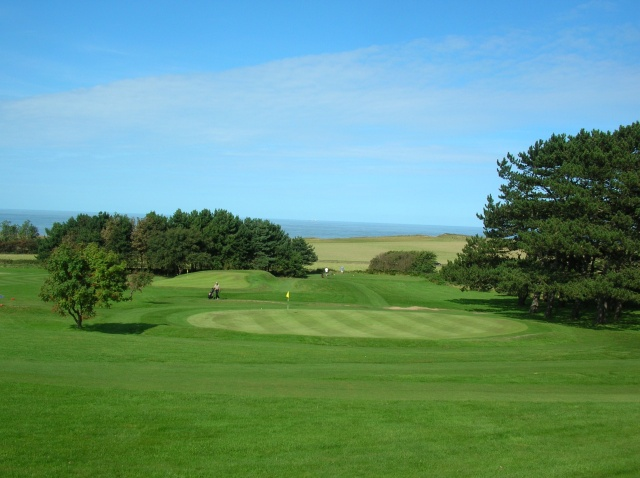
The Links golf course

Abbs also contacted John Henry Taylor the professional golfer. Taylor was one of the pioneers of the modern game of golf. He was also a significant golf course architect and Abbs asked Taylor to design a new golf course for his guests to enjoy, on the land adjacent to the new hotel. The nine-hole golf course opened in 1903. In 1906 Taylor extends course to 18 holes which circles around nearby Incleborough Hill. Finally in 1912 Abbs purchased a clubhouse pavilion from Sheringham Golf Club and this was erected next to the hotel.

=== World War II ===
After the start of World War II in 1939 the hotel and golf course were commandeered by the British Army. Troops were billeted in the hotel and the golf course was used for final troop training and as a firing range. After the war the golf course was reinstated and Bobby Locke participated in the opening game.
