= Sheringham Little Theatre =

Theatre and cinema in Sheringham, Norfolk, England

Coordinates: 52.9434°N 1.2108°E

- Sheringham Town Hall; The Empire
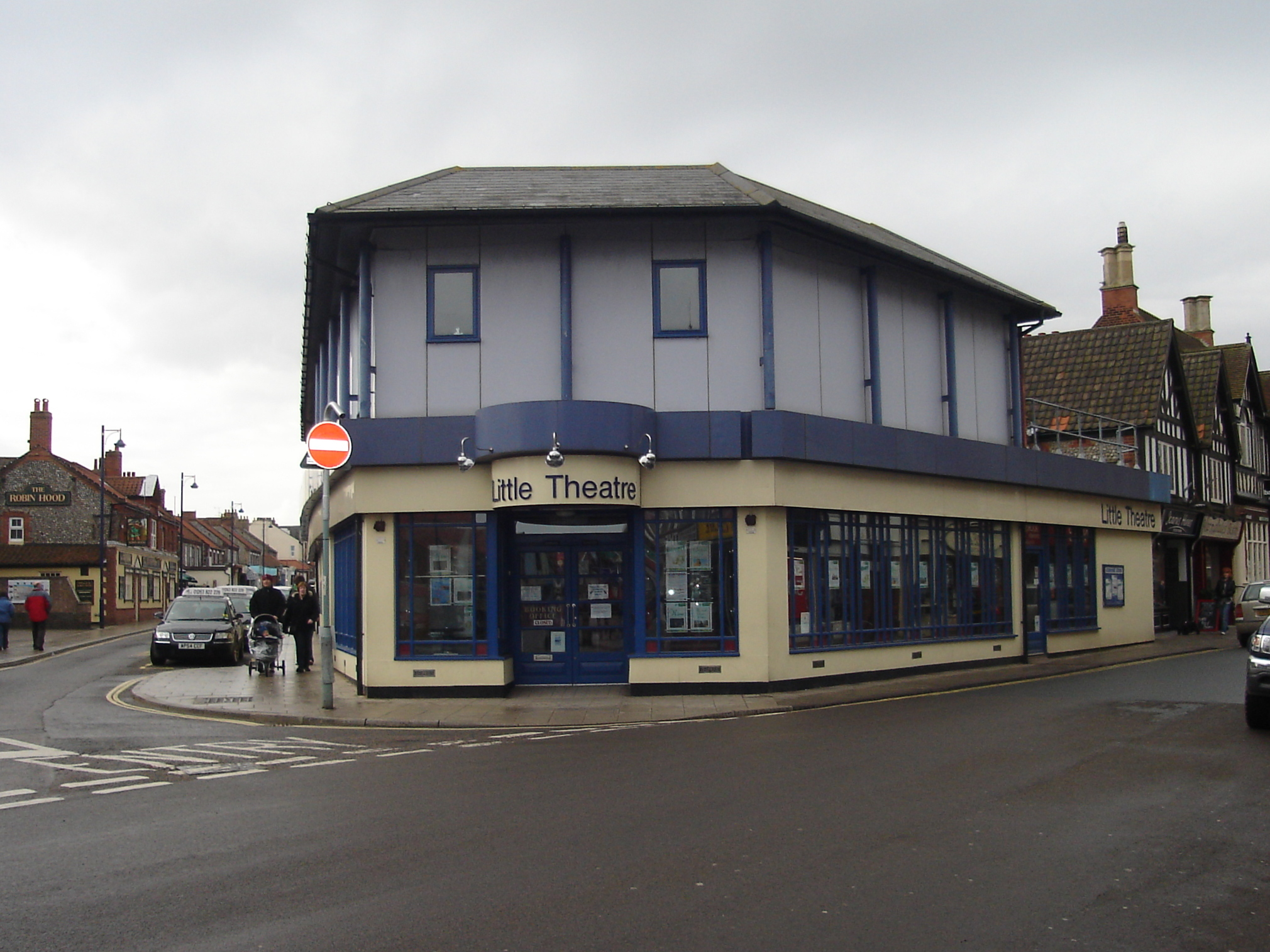
- Sheringham Little Theatre as seen from the Town Centre
- Interactive map of Sheringham Little Theatre
- Address: 2 Station Rd, Sheringham NR26 8RE; United Kingdom
- Capacity: 180
- Type: Theatre - active
- Current use: Theatre, performing arts venue,

Construction
- Opened: 1897; 129 years ago
- Closed: 1960
- Rebuilt: 1930
- Years active: 1914 – present

Website
- http://sheringhamlittletheatre.com

Sheringham Little Theatre is a theatre in Sheringham, Norfolk, England. It stages live theatre and music, and film screenings.

== History ==
The building that houses the modern theatre was constructed in 1897, originally as a meeting hall for social events. After Sheringham Town Hall on Church Street was completed and became the main venue for public events in 1912, the Station Road building became a local arts centre. Silent films were shown to the public from 1914. By 1930 it was known as 'The Picture House', being renamed 'The Empire' in the late 1950s and becoming a 'The Little Theatre' in 1960.

By 1930 the building had been acquired by Victor Harrison. He installed what was then a new sound system and opened with the film Canaries Sometimes Sing. In 2012 the theatre underwent £48,000 worth of renovation to the building by landlords North Norfolk District Council and now has a digital projector, cafe and bar.

== Facilities ==
In September 2017, the theatre began a series of "wellbeing-boosting community music workshops" in the café, that included instruction in a variety of musical instruments, through funding by the Big Lottery Fund Awards, Norfolk County Council and Sheringham Town Council. The program, which was intended to continue for at least six months, was aimed towards music novices of ages 13 upwards, and particularly those with dementia or other health conditions and their carers.

== Programme ==
The Little Theatre holds one of the last surviving summer repertory seasons in the United Kingdom and runs 'rep' performances from July to September each year. In December and January the theatre produces a pantomime with a cast of professional actors, and local young people in the chorus and smaller roles.

In 2017, Sheringham Little Theatre's director was appointed as creative director to St George's Theatre in Great Yarmouth, to provide an 18-month audience development plan.

Youth musicals of classic shows make up part of the Little Theatre's programme. In September 2016, the youth group performed a selection of musical theatre songs from previous productions and planned future musicals to raise money for the theatre's refurbishment scheme. A 2017 production of Oliver! was presented, also to raise money for the refurbishment scheme, and as a tribute to a late local amateur actor.

== Awards ==
In 2016 the theatre entered for the Norfolk Arts Awards, winning the Eastern Daily Press People's Choice "for small attractions." In June 2017 the theatre self reported that it had reached the final round of the Muddy Stilettos Norfolk Awards for Best Theatre.

== John Hurt ==
In 2013 Sir John Hurt was part of a 'Spring into Cinema' campaign which included the screening of the film A Late Quartet. Hurt was complimentary of the theatre's "cinema venture" which he saw as "broaden[ing] people's understanding" of cinema, and wished "something like this was around when I was young." The same year Hurt prerecorded a voice role as the 'magic mirror' for The Little Theatre's production of Snow White.
