= Alfred Marnau =

German-language writer (1918–1999)

- Born: Alfred Franz Ludwig Marnau; 24 April 1918; Bratislava, Austria-Hungary
- Died: 15 June 1999 (aged 81); London, United Kingdom
- Occupations: Novelist, poet
- Spouse: Senta Polányi (m. 1941)
- Children: 1
- Writing career
- Pen name: Fred Marnau
- Period: Modernism

Alfred Marnau (24 April 1918 – 15 June 1999), also known as Fred Marnau, was a poet and novelist in both German and English and, later in life, a traditionalist Catholic activist.

== Life ==
=== Early life ===
Alfred Franz Ludwig Marnau was born on 24 April 1918 in Pressburg (now Bratislava), Austria-Hungary, to a German-speaking Catholic family of Carpathian German origin.

In 1935, aged seventeen, he moved to Prague, where he supported himself as a radio actor, translator and journalist. Here he joined a circle of Czech poets including Josef Hora and Jaroslav Seifert. When the Wehrmacht invaded Czechoslovakia, he returned to Bratislava.

At a musical evening in 1938, he met Senta Polányi (born 1921), a cellist of Jewish heritage, also a Bratislava native. The same year, Senta moved to England to escape the Nazis; and Marnau followed her in August 1939. In England, Marnau was interned as an "untrustworthy alien" until Whitsun 1941. Senta's family perished at Auschwitz.

In 1944 Marnau befriended Oskar Kokoschka and worked for a while as the painter's secretary. Kokoschka drew his portrait in 1960 or 1961; and the painter appears in Marnau's 1961 work Räuber-Requiem. In 1986, he contributed to the catalogue of the Tate's Kokoschka exhibition; and in 1992 he collaborated with Kokoschka's widow Olda on an edition of the painter's letters.

=== Literary activity ===
Marnau published his first book of poetry, Der Gesang der Maurer, in 1936, aged eighteen, which was confiscated by Czech authorities because of its "pacifist" content.

In London, Marnau associated with the "New Romantic" poets, such as Alex Comfort, Wrey Gardiner and Herbert Read. With Wrey Gardiner he ran the Grey Walls Press and edited Poetry Quarterly. He was the editor of New Road, published by Grey Walls, from 1945 to 1946.

Marnau's poetry has been described as "symbolist" and "tend[ing] towards religiosity." Others have observed that even in his earliest work (Der Gesang der Maurer, 1936), his "Christian-humanist" credo is detectable.

=== Catholic activism ===
Marnau joined the Latin Mass Society in 1969 and was elected Chairman in 1973. He resigned as Chairman of the Latin Mass Society in 1982, but renewed his involvement in July 1988, being elected Vice-President. Marnau was a signatory to the 1971 statement in favour of the Tridentine rite, which led to the "Agatha Christie indult".

In 1981, Marnau and Sue Coote founded Pro Ecclesia et Pontifice, of which Marnau was Chairman. He resigned as Chairman of Pro Ecclesia following the death of his wife in 1985.

Marnau joined the Order of Malta in 1986, making his simple vows as a Knight of Justice on 21 May 1992 and his solemn (perpetual) vows on 16 November 1995.

=== Later life and death ===
In addition to his literary activities, he ran a travel agency, Pilgrim Holidays, with his wife until her death in 1985.

Senta Marnau died 15 March 1985 and is buried in Highgate Cemetery. Alfred Marnau died in London on 15 June 1999 and is also buried in Highgate Cemetery.

Marnau's daughter Corinna entered the Benedictine abbey of St. Cecilia, Ryde, Isle of White, where she made her solemn profession in 1988.

== Honours ==
In 1993 Marnau was made Honorary Professor of Literature at the University of Vienna and awarded the medal Pro Cultura Hungarica. After his death in 1999 he received the Goldenes Verdienstzeichen of the city of Vienna.

== In literature ==
Jeremy Reed's Elegy for Alfred Marnau appeared in 2000. Reed's Elegy for Senta, dedicated to Senta Marnau, had appeared after her death in 1985.

Marnau's daughter, Corinna, known by her religious name, Sister Maximilian, wrote a memoir, The Threefold Garland, under the pen-name Severine Kirchhof.

== Works ==
=== In German ===
==== Novels ====
- Der steinerne Gang (part 1 of Die Mitwirkenden). Nuremberg: Nest Verlag, 1948. English tr., as Free among the Dead, London: Harvill, 1950. 2nd ed., Nördlingen: Greno, 1989.
- Das Verlangen nach der Hölle (part 2 of Die Mitwirkenden). Frankfurt: Suhrkamp Verlag, 1952. English tr., as The Guest, London: Thames and Hudson, 1956. 2nd ed. Nördlingen: Greno, 1987
- Polykarp und Zirpelin Imperator (part 3 of Die Mitwirkenden). Nördlingen: Greno, 1987.

==== Poetry ====
- Wounds of the Apostles, with facing-page English translation by Ernst Sigler. London: Grey Walls Press, 1944.
- Death of the Cathedral: Der Tod der Kathedrale, with facing-page English translation by Ernst Sigler. London: Grey Walls Press, 1946.
- Räuber-Requiem: Gedichtauswahl. Salzburg: Otto Müller Verlag, 1961.
- Vogelfrei: Frühe Gedichte 1935–1940. Nördlingen: Greno, 1988.

=== In English ===
- New Poems. London: Enitharmon Press, 1984.
