= Sheringham Golf Club =

Golf club in Norfolk, England

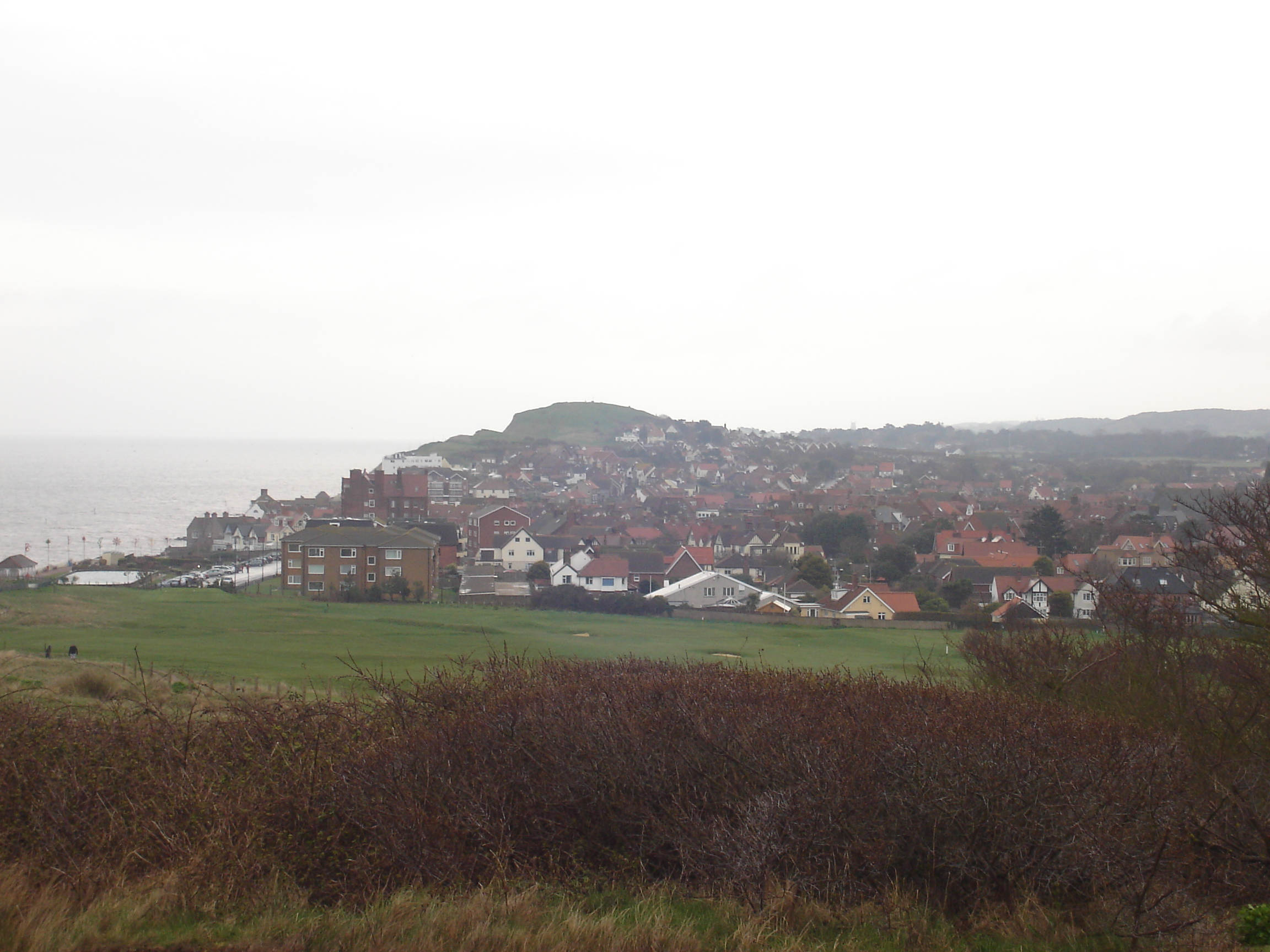
- Looking across the eastern part of the course towards the North Sea

- Location in Norfolk
- 52°56′42″N 1°11′22″E

Club information
- Location: Sheringham, Norfolk, England
- Established: 1891
- Tota holes: 18

Sheringham Golf Club is a golf club on the western outskirts of Sheringham, Norfolk, England. The 6546-yard links course was originally designed by Tom Dunn and opened in 1891. The Links Hotel lies a few miles east of the course. The Brigade Lewis gun school once had its headquarters at the clubhouse, and the course hosted the Locan Cup in September 1992. Sheringham Golf Club was among the earliest clubs to introduce gender-free tees.

Writer Mark Person wrote in 2014: "Sheringham Golf Club is a weird beast. Some claim it is a links course, and links are traditionally where the strips of land lie before you reach the beach and the shoreline proper. Which was true here, but the parts of the course closest to the beach here are on the clifftops beside it. This means it's an elevated course, eighty feet above sea level in places. So some would claim it is not a true links course".

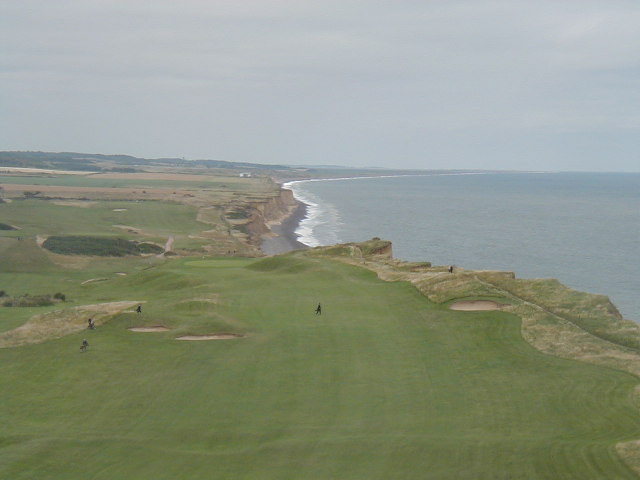
View of the course on the coast
