= Sheringham High School =

Location
- Sheringham, Norfolk, NR26 8ND; England
- 52°56′11″N 1°11′55″E

Information
- Type: Academy
- Trust: North Norfolk Academy Trust
- Department for Education URN: 137621 Tables
- Ofsted: Reports
- Headteacher: Dawn Hollidge
- Gender: Coeducational
- Age: 11 to 18
- Enrolment: 702
- Capacity: 870
- Houses: Carter, Cavell, Nelson, Sewell
- Colours: Burgundy and White
- Uniform: Burgundy sweatshirt with school logo, burgundy polo shirt with school logo, black trousers or skirt, blazer and tie, white shirt.
- Website: http://www.sheringhamhigh.co.uk

Sheringham High School is a secondary school and sixth form located in the town of Sheringham in the English county of Norfolk. The school has around 700 students, usually including between 160 and 180 in the sixth form centre. It shares a campus with Sheringham Primary School and Sheringham Woodfields School. The headteacher is Dawn Hollidge.

== History ==
The school takes students from primary schools in Sheringham, Kelling and Holt. It has a specialism in the arts, and is a member of the Microsoft IT Academy programme.

On 1 November 2011 the school became an academy.

== Curriculum ==
Virtually all maintained schools and academies follow the National Curriculum, and are inspected by Ofsted on how well they succeed in delivering a 'broad and balanced curriculum'. The school has to decide whether Key Stage 3 contains years 7, 8 and 9, or whether year 9 should be in Key Stage 4 and the students in that year just study subjects that will be examined by the GCSE exams at 16. Sheringham had decided to take the latter approach. The timetable is planned a 50 period fortnight.

Key Stage 3

In 2019, Key Stage 3 students studied:

Subject	Yr 7	Yr 8
English	7	7
Mathematics	7	7
Science	6	6
Modern Languages (German and French)	6	6
Ethics and Philosophy	5	5
Physical Education	3	3
Geography	3	4
History	4	3
Art & Design	2	2
Music	2	2
Drama	2	2
Design Technology	3	3
#Subject Choice|Total	50	50

Key Stage 4

Students study a core curriculum with German or French, History or Geography and two optional subjects selected from a short list.

== Ofsted Inspections ==
In 2012 Ofsted carried out an interim assessment of the school and confirmed the previous judgement of Good. In 2014 it was inspected again and judged Good.

== Houses ==
Sheringham High School has four houses named after famous Norfolk people. Carter house named after adventurer Howard Carter, Cavell named after nurse Edith Cavell, Nelson after Lord Admiral Nelson and Sewell after author Anna Sewell.

== Media coverage ==
In Spring 2009, Sheringham High School was featured in the Channel 4 series entitled "The Sex education show VS Pornography" hosted by Anna Richardson.
