= Beeston Hill Y Station =

Secret listening station located on Beeston Hill, Sheringham

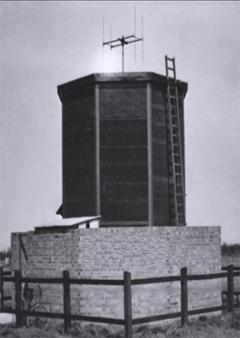
- Beeston Hill Y Station

- Location within Norfolk

General information
- Architectural style: Listening station
- Location: Sheringham, England
- Coordinates: 52.94326°N 1.22490°E
- Completed: 1939
- Demolished: 1946
- Client: War Office

Technical details
- Structural system: Concrete and Brickwork

Beeston Hill Y Station was a secret listening station located on the summit of Beeston Hill, Sheringham in the English county of Norfolk. The chain of Y stations were the front line of the War Office's Bletchley Park, which had the code name station X.

== Description ==
This Y Station was a specially constructed wireless interception facility which was also used for direction finding on enemy wireless transmissions. This became particularly important in the Battle of the Atlantic (1939–1945) where locating U-boats became a critical issue. Admiral Dönitz told his commanders that they could not be located if they limited their wireless transmissions to under 30 seconds, but skilled direction finding operators were able to locate the origin of their signals in as little as 6 seconds. There were several of these stations around the east coast, and by triangulating the signals the exact location of enemy shipping could be pinpointed.

=== Operation ===
The equipment used for direction finding was located on the summit of the hill in a small hexagonal shaped hut. The radio interception equipment was positioned within a control room which was located 500 yards (460 m) from the direction finding station. This listening station intercepted VHF radio signals, which were used by German E-boats (fast patrol boats) for short range voice communication. The listening station was part of a chain of stations set up around the country that gathered the enemy's raw signals, transmitted in Morse code, for processing at the X-station at Bletchley Park. Coded messages were taken down by hand and sent to Bletchley on paper by despatch riders or, later, by teleprinter.

== Code Breakers ==
The chain of Y stations, to which Beeston Hill belonged, contributed on average 3000 coded messages each day to Bletchley Park. At Bletchley Park the messages were taken to different 'huts', depending on whether they had come from the German army, air force, navy or another source. The secret military intelligence gathered in this way was code-named Ultra and Winston Churchill called those involved his "geese that laid the golden eggs but never cackled". During the early days of the Second World War, it was members of the First Aid Nursing Yeomanry who were entrusted to personally deliver the decoded messages to him.

== The site ==
The concrete remains of part of this facility can still be seen on the summit of the hill. They consist of an octagonal concrete base that measures 3.85 m (12 ft 8 in) across, with a channel running west to east across the middle. On the southern edge of the octagon is a raised area of concrete, which is 22.5 cm (8.9 in) higher than the rest of the base. Around the edge of the octagon are the remnants of what was once a reinforced parapet, which has long been removed. There are also signs of a Fletton brick wall running westward away from the raised area. The octagonal shape of the base indicates that a direction-finding station operator's hut stood there. It would have consisted of a double-skinned wooden structure in which the cavity was filled with shingle pebbles designed to make the structure "splinter proof" or "bulletproof".

=== BBC's Coast TV episode ===
In an episode of the BBC1 series “Coast”, the triangulation technique was explained and demonstrated. In the same programme, Joy Hale was interviewed by the presenter, Hermione Cockburn. Hale had been a WREN during the war and had been an operator at the Y-station.

== Gallery ==
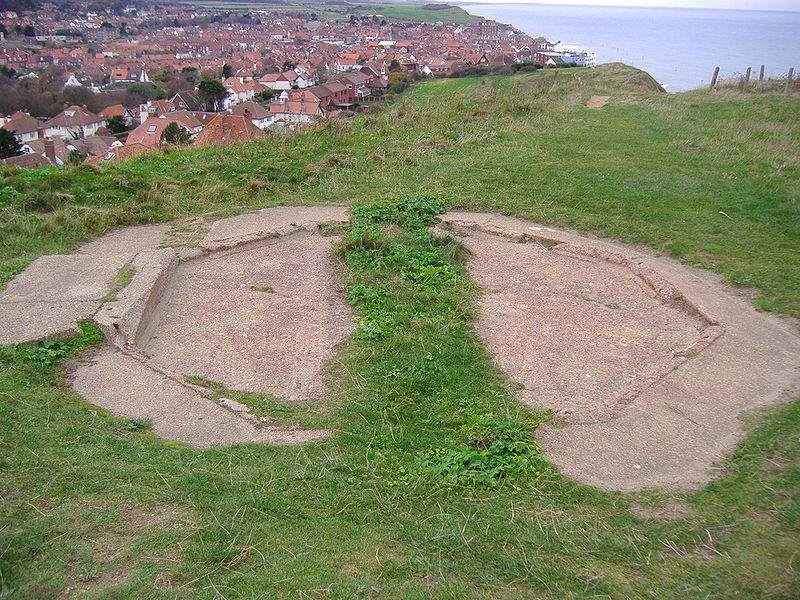
Foundation remains of the Y station

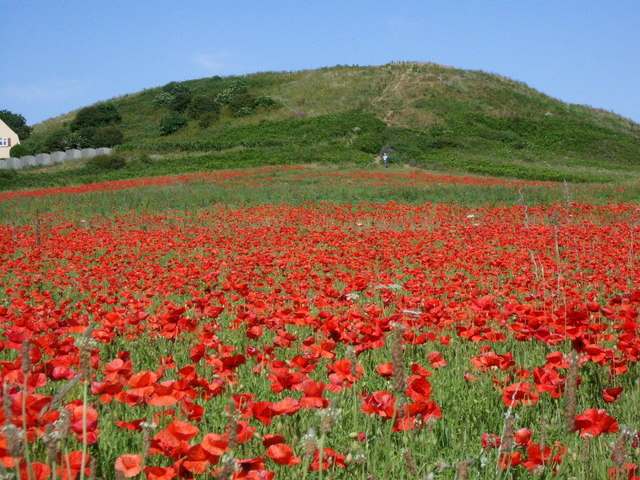
Beeston Hill

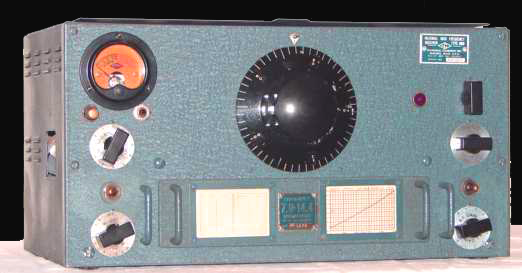
The National HRO communication receiver was extensively used by the RSS & Y service.
