= Sheringham Town Hall =

Municipal building in Sheringham, Norfolk, England

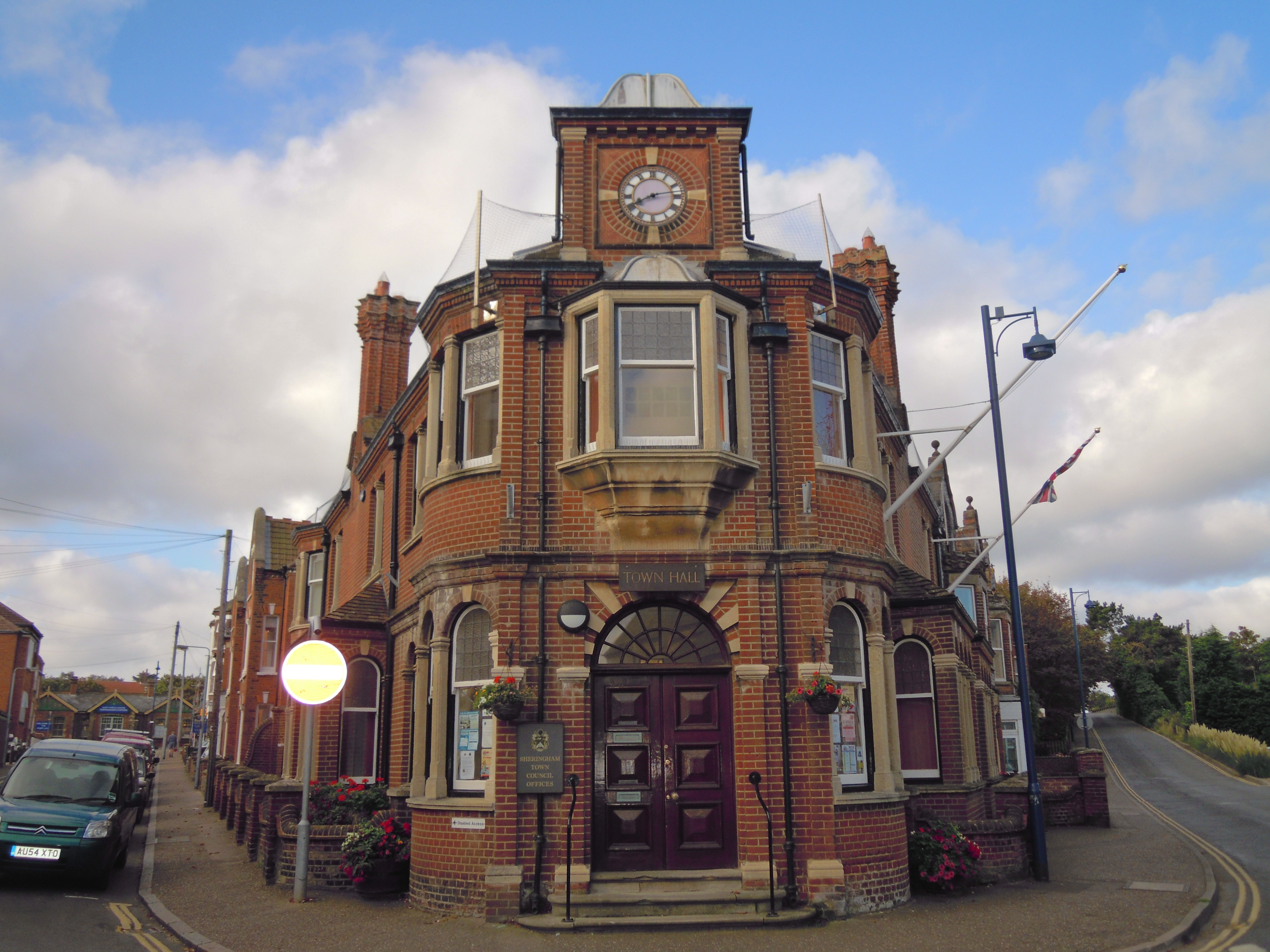
- Sheringham Town Hall

- Shown in Norfolk
- 52.9426°N 1.2084°E
- Location: Church Street, Sheringham

History
- Built: 1912

Site notes
- Architect(s): Stanley Simons & Co.
- Architectural style: Edwardian style

Sheringham Town Hall, formerly known as Sheringham Council Offices, is a former municipal building in Church Street, Sheringham, Norfolk, England. The structure served as the headquarters of Sheringham Urban District Council and then as the offices and meeting place of Sheringham Town Council until it closed in August 2019.

== History ==
Following significant population growth, largely associated with the fishing industry, Lower Sheringham became an urban district in 1901. In 1911, the new council decided to commission purpose-built council offices: the site they selected was vacant land at the junction of Church Street and Saint Peter's Road. The new building was designed by the local architects, Stanley Simons & Co., in the Edwardian style, built in red brick with stone dressings and was completed in 1912.

The design involved a symmetrical main frontage at the junction of Church Street and Saint Peter's Road; the central bay featured a recessed doorway with a fanlight on the ground floor and a prominent oriel window on the first floor surmounted by a short clock tower with a ogee-shaped roof. The central bay was flanked by curved sections which were fenestrated by three-part round headed windows separated by colonettes on the ground floor and three part square-headed windows separated by pilasters on the first floor. The side facades featured sections of four-part round headed windows which were also separated by colonettes. Internally, the principal room was the council chamber on the first floor.

At the end of the First World War, a service of thanksgiving was held outside the town hall to celebrate the armistice: almost the whole town attended the service. The building continued to serve as the headquarters of the urban district council for much of the 20th century, but ceased to be the local seat of government when the enlarged North Norfolk District Council was formed with its offices in Cromer in 1974. It then served as the offices and meeting place of Sheringham Town Council and was the venue for the signing of a twinning agreement with the town of Otterndorf in Lower Saxony in Germany in 1998.

After the town council relocated to Sheringham Community Centre in Holway Road in August 2019, the building was mothballed. The contents of the town hall were auctioned in January 2021 and a planning application to convert the building for residential use was submitted to North Norfolk District Council in July 2021.
