= Magdalen Goffin =

English writer

Magdalen Goffin, FRSL (23 July 1925 – 28 December 2015) was an English writer, born in Sheringham, Norfolk, England, UK. She was a Fellow of the Royal Society of Literature (FRSL) from 1980. She wrote biographies of her grandmother, Maria Pasqua, and her father, E. I. Watkin, and edited the diaries of another ancestor Absalom Watkin. Mrs. Goffin also wrote numerous articles and reviews for the New York Review of Books (1966–69).

== Publications ==
- Objections to Roman Catholicism. Constable, 1964. (contrib chapter "Superstition and Credulity")
- The Future of Catholic Christianity. Constable, 1966. (contrib chapter "The Broken Pitcher")
- Maria Pasqua. Oxford University Press, 1979. ISBN 978-0-19-211754-0. Faber & Faber, 2009. ISBN 978-0-571-25034-9.
- The Diaries of Absalom Watkin: A Manchester Man 1787-1861. Sutton Publishing,1993. ISBN 978-0-7509-0417-9.
- The Watkin Path - An Approach to Belief: The Life of E. I. Watkin. Sussex Academic Press, 2006. ISBN 978-1-84519-128-3.
