= E. I. Watkin =

Edward Ingram Watkin (27 September 1888 - 2 March 1981) was an English Catholic philosopher, pacifist and writer.

== Life ==
He studied at St Paul's School, London and New College, Oxford. In 1908, Watkin became a convert to Catholicism. He publicly opposed conscription in 1916, a position he upheld in his 1939 pamphlet The Crime of Conscription.

In 1927, Watkin befriended the exiled Italian priest Don Luigi Sturzo, whose work Watkin would later publish in the Dublin Review.

Watkin's best known works were Philosophy of Mysticism (1920) and A Philosophy of Form (1938). He has been described as "one of the few non-Thomist Catholic philosophers of the early twentieth century."

In 1930, Watkin translated Jacques Maritain’s French edition of “An Introduction to Philosophy” into English.

== Pacifism ==
Watkin was a pacifist and joined the pacifist organization The Guild of the Pope's Peace in 1916 which promoted peaceful solutions to World War I. He founded in 1936 with Eric Gill and Donald Attwater the inter-war Catholic pacifist movement Pax. This movement was prominently supported by Dorothy Day.

Watkin was opposed to fascism, and his book The Catholic Centre includes a critique of Fascist Italy and Nazi Germany as being part of "a social revolt against reason".

== Family ==
His maternal grandfather was Herbert Ingram; Edward Watkin was a great-uncle on his father's side.

His daughter was Magdalen Goffin.

== Works ==
- Some Thoughts on Catholic Apologetics: A Plea for Interpretation (1915)
- A Little Book of Prayers for Peace (1916)
- The Philosophy of Mysticism (1920)
- The Bow in the Clouds: An Essay Towards the Integration of Experience (1931)
- Theism, Agnosticism And Atheism (1936)
- Men and Tendencies (London: Sheed & Ward, 1937)
- A Philosophy of Form (1938)
- The Crime of Conscription (1939)
- The Catholic Center (1939)
- Praise of Glory (1943)
- The Balance of Truth (1943)
- Catholic Art and Culture. New York, Sheed & Ward. 1944.
- Poets and Mystics (1953)
- Neglected Saints (1955)
- Roman Catholicism in England from the Reformation to 1950 (1957)
- The Church in Council (1960)
