= Christian Aid Week =

Annual charity fundraising drive in the UK

Christian Aid Week is an annual door-to-door fundraising drive by the charity Christian Aid. The drive is held each year in Britain during the second week of May, when thousands of volunteers post red collection envelopes to households around the country. Held each year since 1957 the event celebrated its 50th anniversary in 2007, making it Britain's longest running fundraising week.

Christian Aid works with 700 local organisations across 50 developing countries. Working with poor communities, it trains people to deal with the effects of climate change and prepares them for the threat of natural disasters. These local organisations - or 'partners' – also work on HIV, training and education, health and sanitation and peace and reconciliation.

In 2007 the organisation encouraged people to plant trees in support of its overseas work on climate change projects. The charity aimed to raise £15.5 million from the annual fundraising week in 2007, and approximately 300,000 volunteers across the United Kingdom posted the well known red envelopes through millions of letterboxes.

In 2013, £12.6 million (or 13% percent of the total income) were raised during this week.

== History ==
In 1945 the British and Irish churches established the Christian Reconstruction in Europe. Its purpose was to raise funds for the resettlement of some of the millions of people left homeless by World War II.

In 1948, it was renamed the Inter-Church Aid and Refugee Service, and became part of the British Council of Churches. During the next decade, the organisation began to move into worldwide development work. The overriding theme was the promotion of self-reliance.

In 1957, Janet Lacey, the organisation's then director, decided to hold a "Christian Aid Week" to encourage public awareness. This first event mobilised residents in 200 towns and villages across Britain, collecting £26,000 for overseas development work.

In 1964 the agency changed its name to Christian Aid. During the 1960s, the threat of hunger, even famine, made agricultural development a priority in the poorest regions of the world, especially Africa and Asia. As well as overseas aid, Christian Aid began to tell Church supporters and schools about the causes of poverty and helped establish the World Development Movement.

Early in 2020 Christian Aid promoted two major features for Christian Aid Week in May that year, to encourage supporters to hold a "Big Brekkie" fry-up meal in their homes, churches or other social settings, and the innovation of delivery-only envelopes that could be brought to homes but did not require personal collection by local collectors and would be posted to Christian Aid or handed in at pre-arranged points instead. However the emergence of the Coronavirus pandemic in March that year and the subsequent lockdown led to advice in April from the chief executive, Amanda Khozi Mukwashi, not to proceed with door-to-door envelope distribution and collection and associated face-to-face fund raising activities, instead encouraging online donations from the public. Projects flagged up for particular support included provision of counter-measures to the disease in refugee camps.
