= Thomas Gresham =

English merchant and financier (1519–1579)

Sir Thomas Gresham
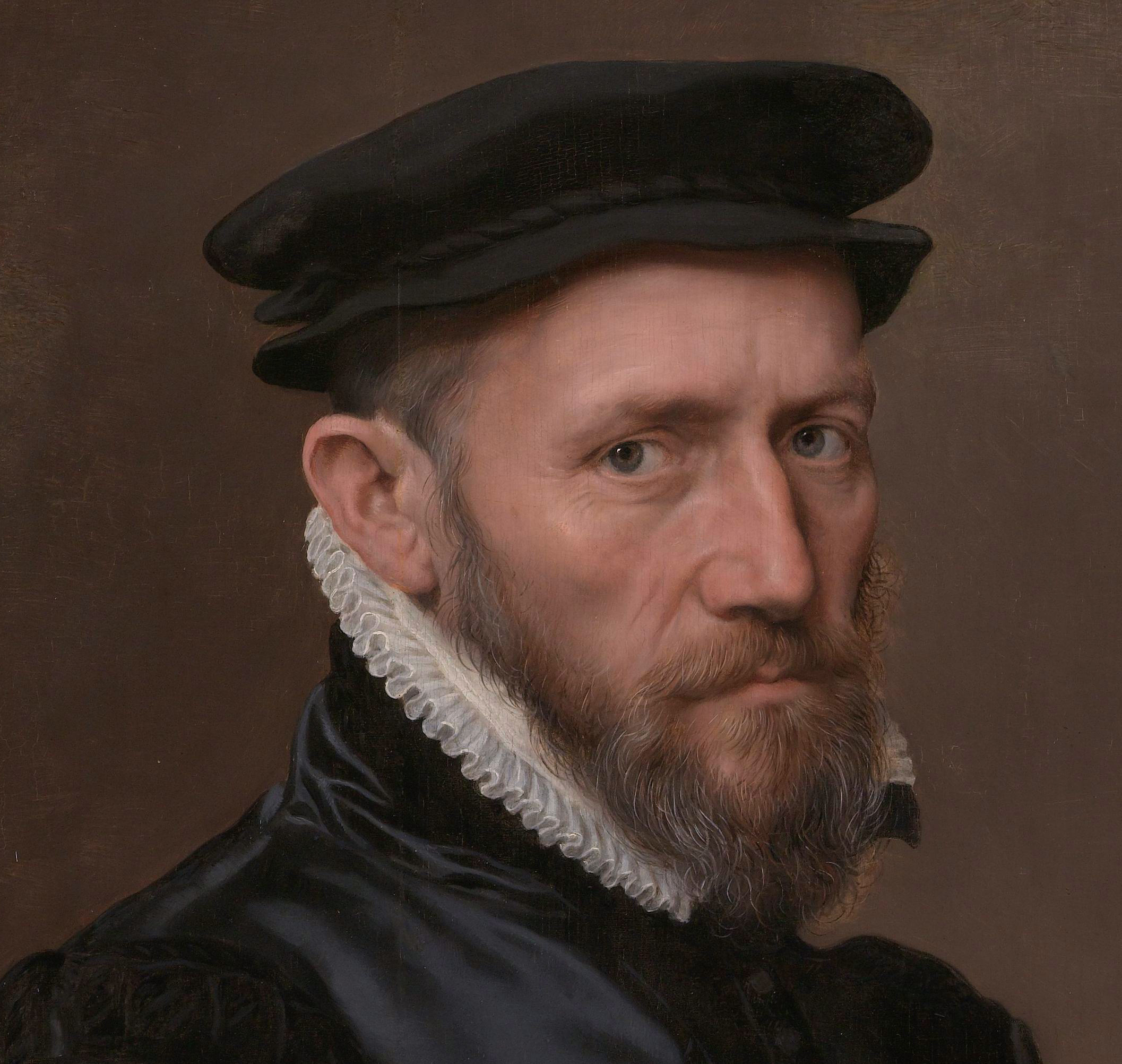
- Portrait of Thomas Gresham, aged approximately 41. From the collection of the Rijksmuseum.
- Born: Thomas Gresham the Elder c. 1519; London, England
- Died: 21 November 1579 (aged 59–60); London, England
- Resting place: St Helen's Church, Bishopsgate, London, England
- Education: Gonville and Caius College, Cambridge
- Occupations: Merchant, financier
- Known for: Founder of The Royal Exchange and Gresham College
- Spouse: Anne Ferneley (m. 1544)
- Father: Sir Richard Gresham

Sir Thomas Gresham the Elder (/ˈɡrɛʃəm/; c. 1519 – 21 November 1579) was an English merchant and financier who acted on behalf of King Edward VI (1547–1553) and Edward's half-sisters, queens Mary I (1553–1558) and Elizabeth I (1558–1603). In 1565 Gresham founded the Royal Exchange in the City of London.

== Origins ==
Born in London and descended from an old Norfolk family, Gresham was one of two sons and two daughters of Sir Richard Gresham, a leading merchant mercer and Lord Mayor of London, who was knighted by King Henry VIII for negotiating favourable loans with foreign merchants.

== Education ==
Gresham was educated at St Paul's School. After that, although his father wanted Thomas to become a merchant, Sir Richard first sent him to university at Gonville and Caius College, Cambridge. He was concurrently apprenticed in the Mercers' Company to his uncle Sir John Gresham, founder of Gresham's School, while he was still at Cambridge.

== Agent in the Low Countries ==
In 1543 the Mercers' Company admitted the 24-year-old Gresham as a liveryman, and later that year he left England for the Low Countries, where, either on his own account or that of his father or uncle, he carried on business as a merchant whilst acting in various matters as agent for King Henry VIII. In 1544 he married Anne Ferneley, widow of the London merchant Sir William Read, but maintained residence principally in the Low Countries, basing his headquarters at Antwerp in present-day Belgium (then the Spanish Netherlands), where he became renowned for his adept market-play.

== Financial acumen ==
=== Rescue of the pound ===
When in 1551 the mismanagement of Sir William Damsell, King's Merchant to the Low Countries, had caused the English Government much financial embarrassment, the authorities called Gresham for advice, thereafter following his proposals. Gresham advocated the adoption of various methods – highly ingenious, but quite arbitrary and unfair – for raising the value of the pound sterling on the Stock Exchange in Antwerp which proved so successful that in just a few years King Edward VI had discharged almost all of his debts. The Government sought Gresham's advice in all their money difficulties, and also frequently employed him in various diplomatic missions. He had no stated salary, but in reward of his services received from King Edward various grants of lands, the annual value of which amounted ultimately to about £400 (equivalent to £188,500 in 2025) a year.

=== Later services to the Crown ===
On the accession of Queen Mary I in 1553, Gresham fell out of favour at Court for a short time with Alderman William Dauntsey displacing him. But Dauntsey's financial operations proved unsuccessful and Gresham was soon reinstated; and as he professed his zealous desire to serve the Queen, and manifested great adroitness both in negotiating loans and in smuggling money, arms and foreign goods, not only were his services retained throughout her reign (1553–1558), but besides his salary of twenty shillings per diem he received grants of church lands to the yearly value of £200 (equivalent to £72,866 in 2025).

Under Queen Elizabeth I's reign (1558–1603), besides continuing in his post as financial agent of the Crown, Gresham acted as Ambassador Plenipotentiary to the Court of Duchess Margaret of Parma, Governor of the Netherlands, and was appointed a Knight Bachelor in 1559 prior to his departure. The unsettled times preceding the Dutch revolt compelled him to leave Antwerp on 10 March 1567; but, though he spent the remainder of his life in London, he continued his business as merchant and government financial agent in much the same way as he had always done.

Gresham also acted, for Queen Elizabeth, as gaoler to Lady Mary Grey (sister of Lady Jane Grey), who, as a punishment for marrying Thomas Keyes the sergeant-porter, was imprisoned both in his Bishopsgate house as well as his other home, Osterley Park, from June 1569 to the end of 1572.

=== Founding of the Royal Exchange ===
In 1565 Gresham made a proposal to the City of London's Court of Aldermen to build, at his own expense, a bourse or exchange – what became the Royal Exchange, modelled on the Antwerp bourse – on condition that the Corporation provided for this purpose a suitable location. In this proposal he seems to have had a good eye for his self-interest as well as for the general good of the city's merchants, for by a yearly rental of £700 (equivalent to £307,979 in 2025) obtained for the shops in the upper part of the building he received more than sufficient return for his trouble and expense.

The foundation of the Royal Exchange is the background of Thomas Heywood's play: If You Know Not Me, You Know Nobody part 2, in which a Lord extols the quality of the building when asked if he has ever seen "a goodlier frame":

Not in my life; yet I have been in Venice... In the Rialto there, called Saint Mark's; 'tis but a bauble, if compared to this. The nearest, that which most resembles this, is the great Burse in Antwerp, yet no comparable either in height or wideness, the fair cellarage, or goodly shops above. Oh my Lord Mayor, this Gresham hath much graced your City of London; his fame will long outlive him.

== Marriage and progeny ==
In 1544 he married Anne Ferneley, daughter of William Ferneley and Agnes (née Daundy). Anne was the widow of Sir William Read, a London merchant, with whom she had two sons. By his wife, Gresham, had an only son, Richard, who predeceased both his parents. Gresham also had an illegitimate daughter (also called Anne) who was probably born in the Low Countries.

== Death and burial ==
Gresham died suddenly, apparently of apoplexy, on 21 November 1579 and was buried at St Helen's Church, Bishopsgate in the City of London.

== Bequest for the foundation of Gresham College ==
Apart from some small sums to various charities, Gresham bequeathed the bulk of his property (consisting of estates in London and around England giving an income of more than £2,300 a year) to his widow and her heirs, with the stipulation that after her death his own house in Bishopsgate Street and the rents from the Royal Exchange should be vested in the Corporation of London and the Mercers Company, for the purpose of instituting a college in which seven professors should read lectures, one each day of the week, in astronomy, geometry, physic, law, divinity, rhetoric and music. Thus, Gresham College, the first institution of higher learning in London, came to be established in 1597.

== Gresham's law ==
Gresham's law (stated simply as: "Bad money drives out good") takes its name from him (although others, including the astronomer Nicolaus Copernicus, had recognised the concept for years) because he urged Queen Elizabeth to restore the debased currency of England. However, Sir Thomas never formulated anything like Gresham's law, which was the 1857 conception of Henry Dunning Macleod, an economist with a knack for reading into a text that which was not written.

== The Gresham grasshopper ==
The Gresham family crest is: On a Mount Vert a Grasshopper Or (a golden grasshopper on a green mound); it is displayed by Gresham College, which he founded, and also forms the weathervane on the Royal Exchange in the City of London, also founded by him in 1565. The Faneuil Hall at Boston, Massachusetts, has also borrowed this heraldic device. The Gresham coat of arms is blazoned: Argent, a Chevron Erminés between three Mullets pierced Sable.

According to ancient legend, the founder of the family, Roger de Gresham, was a foundling abandoned as a new-born baby among long grass in Norfolk during the 13th century and found there by a woman whose attention was drawn to the child by a grasshopper. Although a beautiful story, it is more likely that the grasshopper is simply a canting heraldic crest playing on the sound "grassh-" and "Gresh-". The Gresham family uses as its motto Fiat Voluntas Tua ('Thy will be done').

== Legacy ==
- Gresham's law;
- The Royal Exchange, which he founded in 1565, was opened in 1571;
- Gresham College, funded by the bequest of his Will of 1571, was opened in 1597;
- Gresham Street in the City of London running east from St Martin's Le Grand near St Paul's Cathedral, past the Guildhall and the Bank of England is named in his memory;
- The Gresham Club in the City was also named in his honour;
- The Gresham Palace in Budapest is named after him;
- The Gresham Hotel, Dublin is indirectly named after Gresham. It was established in 1817 by another Thomas Gresham, who was given that name as he was a foundling abandoned on the steps of the Royal Exchange;
- Gresham Road, nearby Gresham's mansion at Hounslow: Osterley Park.

== In fiction ==
- Gresham appears as a background figure in a series of fictional mystery novels by the British author Valerie Anand writing under the pen-name of Fiona Buckley. The fictional heroine of the stories, Ursula Blanchard, lived in Antwerp with her first husband while he worked as one of Gresham's agents.
- Gresham also features as the central character of Herbert Strang's book On London River: A Story of the Days of Queen Elizabeth (Oxford University Press, 1936).

== Gallery ==
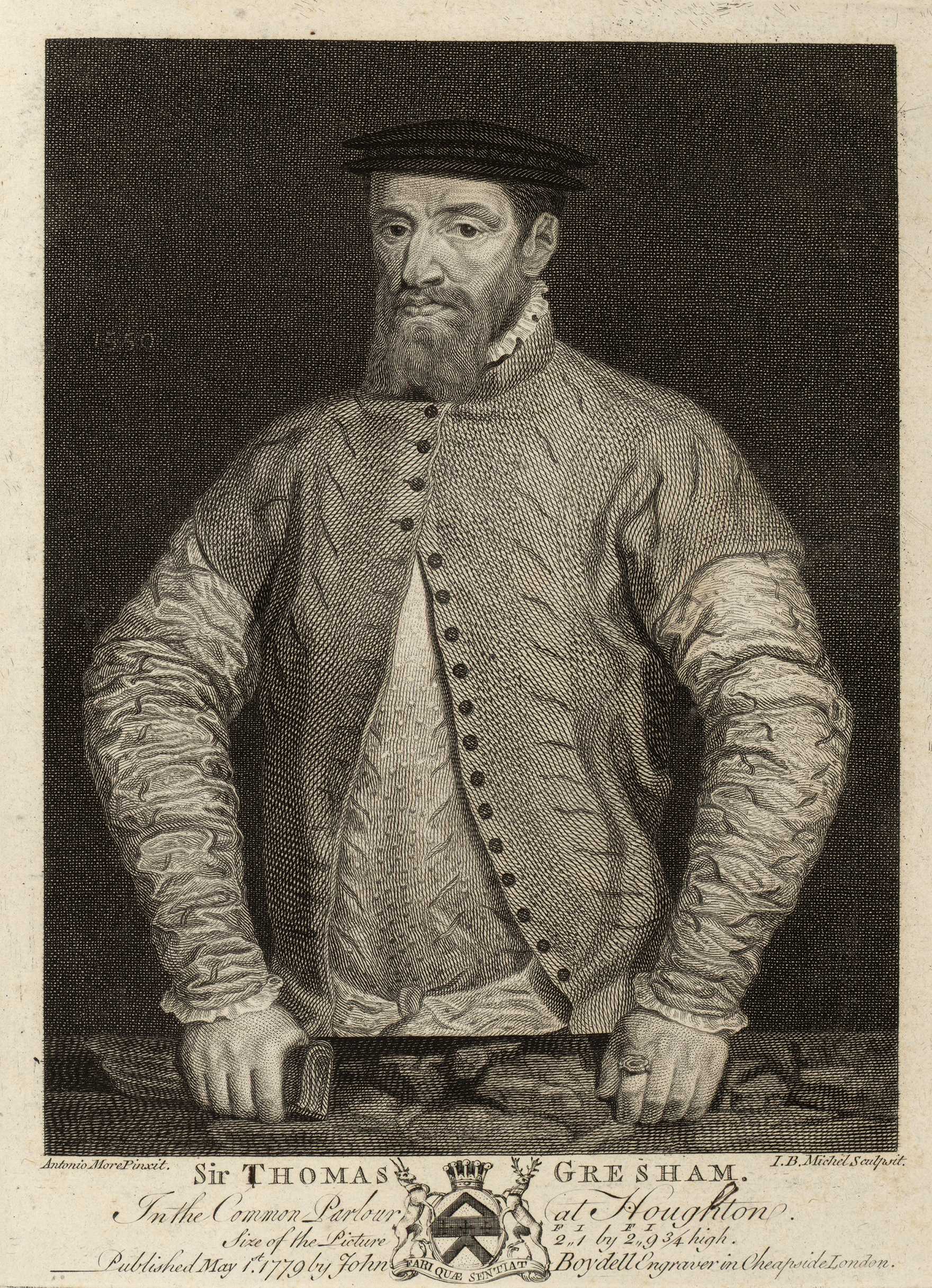
18th century engraving of Sir Thomas Gresham

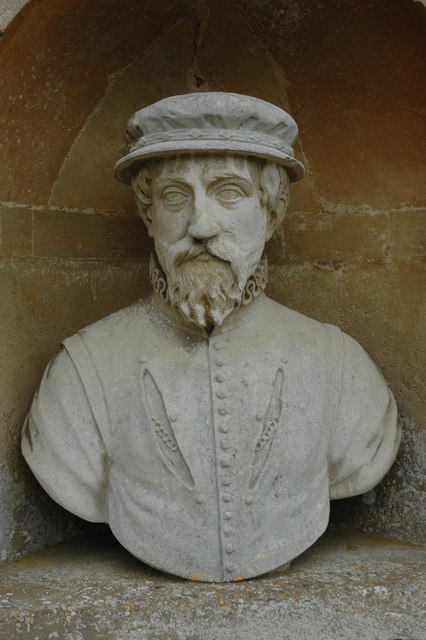
Gresham's bust at
Stowe School

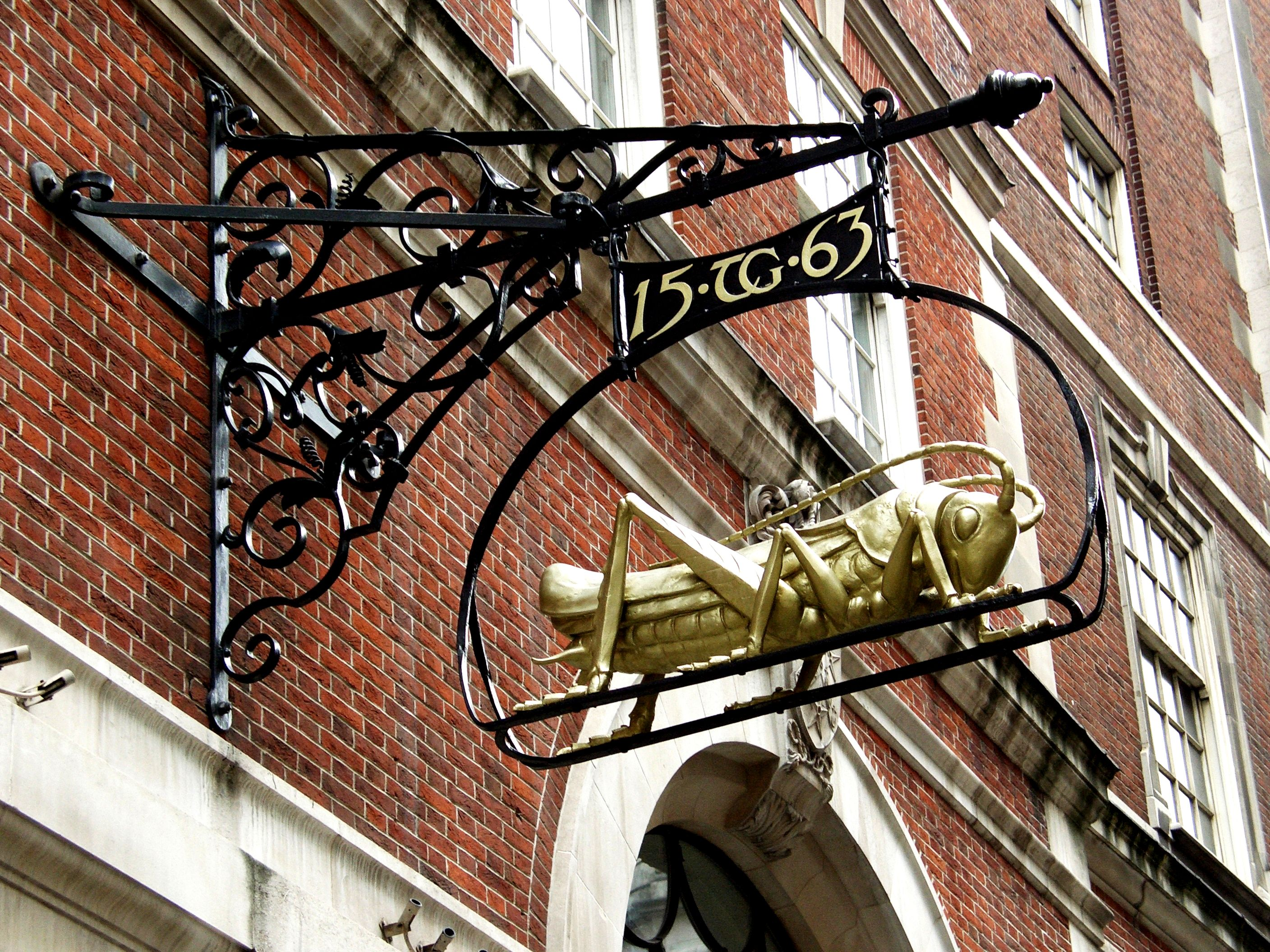
Gresham's initials "TG" and date 1563 with his golden grasshopper emblem, serving as the sign of a bank in Lombard Street, the historic centre of banking in the City of London

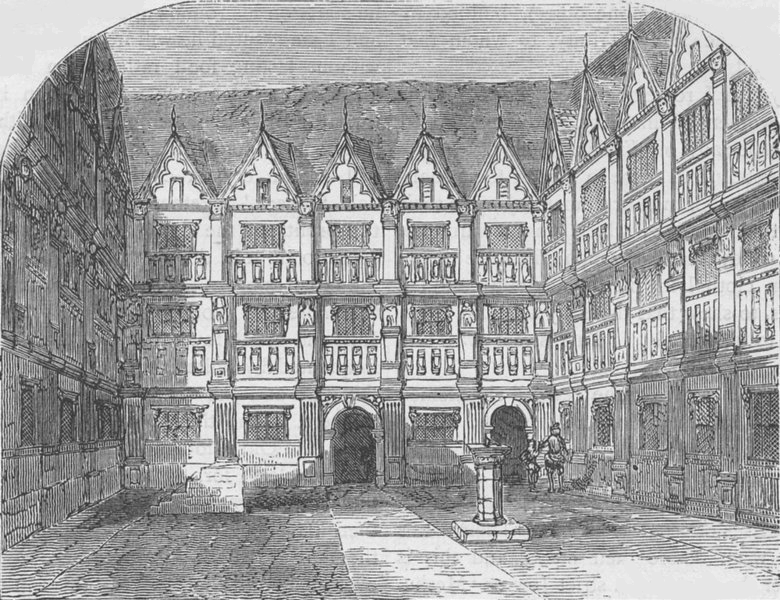
Sir Thomas & Lady Gresham's townhouse in Bishopsgate Street

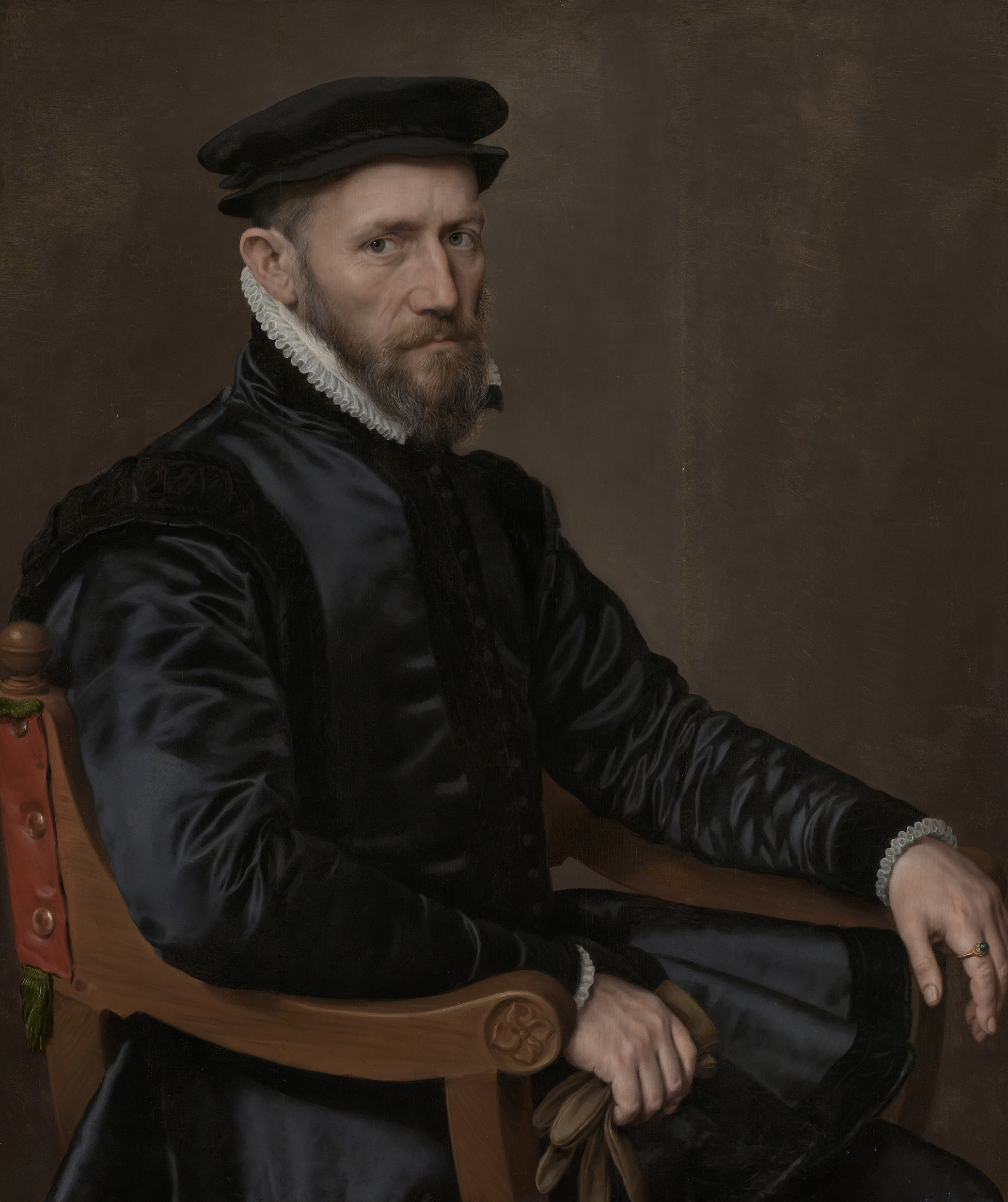
Sir Thomas Gresham, portrait c. 1554 by Anthonis Mor

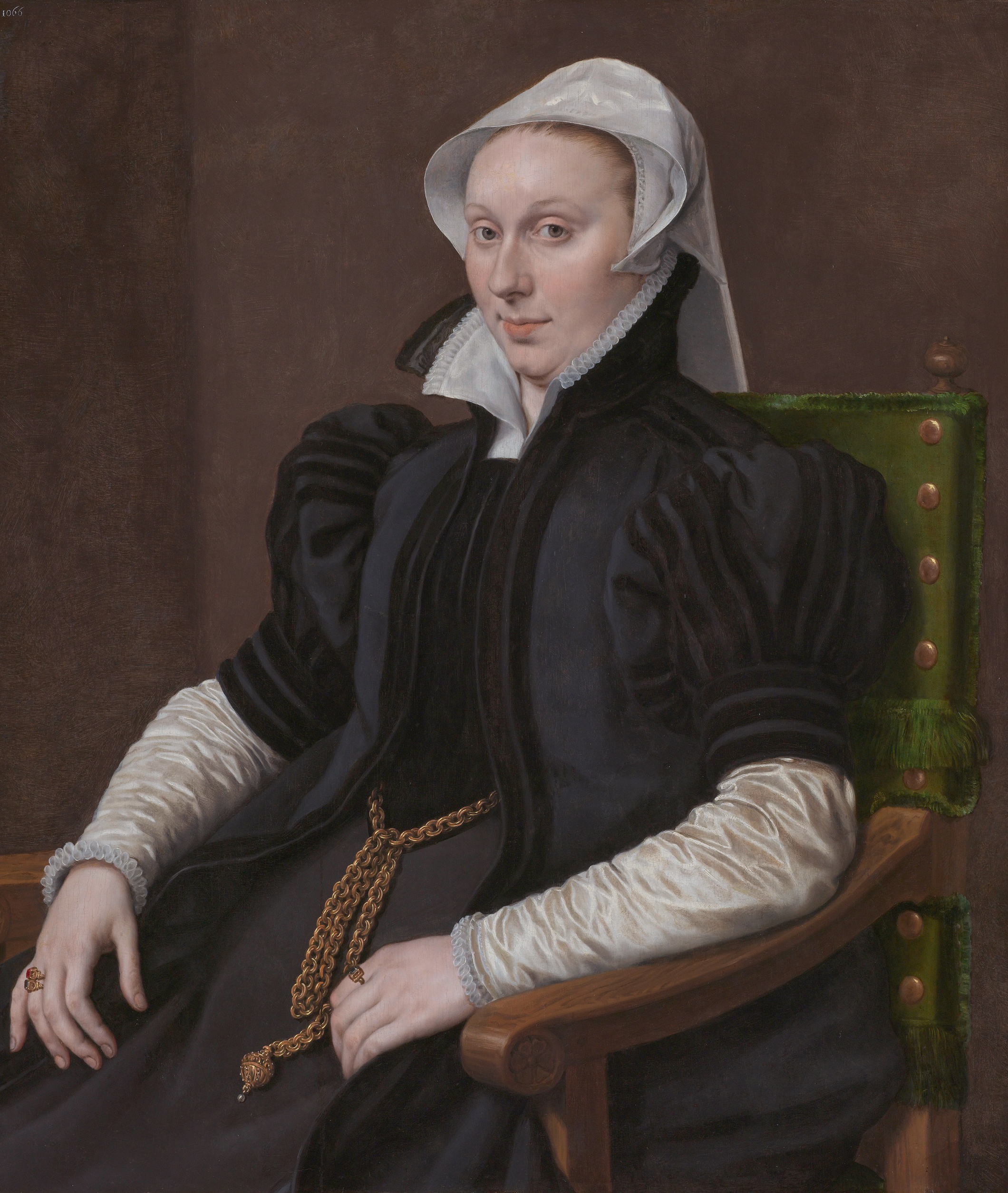
Dame Anne née Ferneley, wife of Sir Thomas Gresham. Portrait c. 1560 by Anthonis Mor

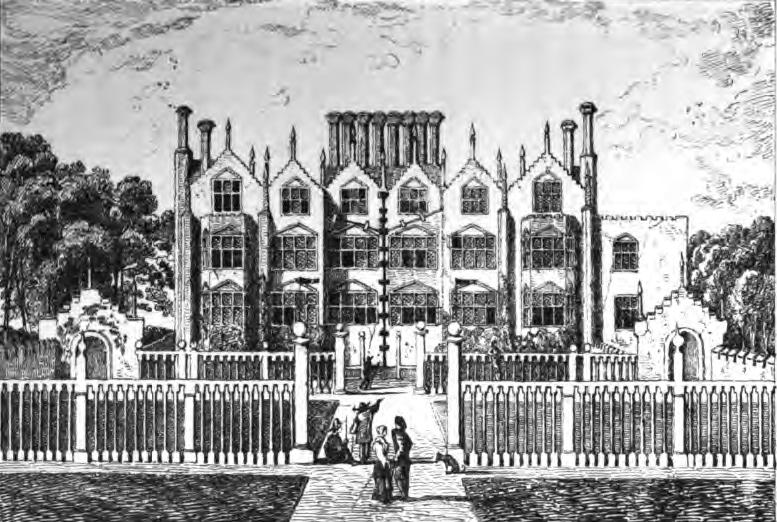
Intwood Hall, Gresham's Norfolk estate

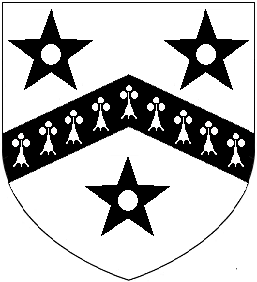
Gresham arms:
Argent a Chevron Erminés between three Mullets pierced Sable

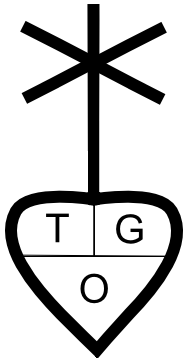
Sir Thomas Gresham's merchant's mark as depicted in the 1544 portrait of him owned by the Mercers' Company. Also as illustrated in Elmhirst, 1959, with more pronounced "heart shape", used by other marks of this type, e.g. the later HEICS mark

== See also ==
- List of multiple discoveries
- Titsey Place
