= Church lands =

Church lands may refer to:

- Glebe, land used to support a parish priest
- Temporalities, secular assets owned by the Roman Catholic church
- Properties and finances of the Church of England

== See also ==
- Churchlands, Western Australia, suburb of Perth
- Churchland (disambiguation)
