= Stanley Morrison =

Stanley Morrison may refer to:

- Stanley Morison (1889–1967), British typographer, printing executive and historian of printing
- Stanley Andrew Morrison (1894–1956), Irish religious missionary
- Stan Morrison (born 1939), American college basketball coach and athletic director
