= Janet Lacey =

English charity director and philanthropist (1903–1988)

Janet Lacey CBE
- Born: 25 October 1903; Sunderland, Tyne and Wear, England
- Died: 11 July 1988 (aged 84); Kensington, Royal Borough of Kensington and Chelsea, England
- Citizenship: United Kingdom
- Occupations: Charity director; Philanthropist
- Years active: 1925–1977

Janet Lacey CBE (25 October 1903 – 11 July 1988) was an English charity director and philanthropist who led the British Council Inter-Church Aid and Refugee Department (later called Christian Aid) from 1952 to 1968. She began working for the Young Women's Christian Association (YWCA) in Kendal and later Dagenham from 1925 to 1945. After the Second World War, Lacey was YMCA education secretary for demobilising British Army of the Rhine soldiers in Germany and was later appointed field young secretary for the British Council of Churches in 1947. At Christian Aid, she helped the organisation refocus on global poverty and funded development projects in 40 countries. She oversaw the establishment of Christian Aid Week in 1957 and was a founder member of the Voluntary Service Overseas organisation in 1958. Lacey became the first woman to preach at St Paul's Cathedral in 1967 and later at Liverpool Cathedral and St George's Cathedral in Jerusalem. She was director of the national Family Welfare Association charity from 1969 to 1973 and wrote the 1970 autobiographical book A Cup of Water.

== Early life ==
On 25 October 1903, Lacey was born in Sunderland, and grew up there. She was the younger child and daughter of the property agent Joseph Lacey and his wife Elizabeth Smurthwaite. She had a sister who died from cancer in mid-life. Lacey was raised a Methodist but became a member of the Church of England later in life; her grandfather was a Methodist minister who conducted services in surrounding villages. She went to local schools in Sunderland and had a mistress who introduced her to English literature. After Lacey's father died when she was 10 years old, her mother decided to send her to live with an aunt in Durham five years later. She had an acrimonious relationship with the aunt and the two frequently argued. She took courses at the Technical School before taking a job that took her to several pit villages that were in poverty. The experiences caused Lacey to get interested in politics and become a member of the Labour Party. A majority of the capital she earned went to drama and elocution funding with the wife of the Durham Cathedral's choir leading tenor and she gave performances at mining villages but decided against a stage career.

== Career ==
In 1925, at age 22, Lacey applied to join the Young Women's Christian Association (YWCA) for employment and was sent to its youth club in Kendal, Westmorland to train as a youth leader. She remained at the youth club for six years and employed her drama skills to use that got her interested in theology for the first time. Lacey moved to Dagenham in 1932, joining the staff of a mixed YWCA and YMCA community centre in a 200,000-strong housing development for those leaving the East End of London. Following the end of the Second World War, she became YMCA education secretary to the demobilising British Army of the Rhine (BAOR), a post she held until 1947. While in Germany, Lacey used her position develop and educational programme, bringing together young German soldiers with refugees and British soldiers. She gained experience of social aid programmes and came into contact with post-war ecumenical church leaders like George Bell.

Lacey was appointed the British Council of Churches' (BCC) field youth secretary charged with youth leadership training in 1947, a job that introduced her to the World Council of Churches. She attended the conferences held in Amsterdam, Evanston, New Delhi and Uppsala, and authored the 1956 presentation By the Waters of Babylon. She worked for the 1951 Bangor Youth Conference. In December 1952, Lacey transferred to the British Council Inter-Church Aid and Refugee Department, and was appointed secretary (later director). When she arrived at the department, its income had dropped to £25,000 but she increased it to £2,500,000 per year during her time there. Working from both Geneva and London, Lacey was eager to promote the organisation's missionary function and argued the Churches had to lead the fight for the hungry world. She aided in the organisation refocus on global poverty and funded development projects in 40 countries. Lacey oversaw the establishment of Christian Aid Week (renamed Christian Aid by her in 1964) in 1957 to aid in the growth of charitable giving for 200 local churches in towns and villages. She was a founder member of the Voluntary Service Overseas organisation in 1958, and was part of the 1959 United Kingdom World Refugee Year Committee.

She was a frequent traveller of the world, and visited the United States regularly. Lacey was a frequent speaker at Church meetings. She also collaborated with the Church World Service and was chair of the World Council's committee on refugee service. In 1967, Lacey became the first woman to preach at St Paul's Cathedral and later at Liverpool Cathedral, and St George's Cathedral in Jerusalem. The following year, she retired as director of Christian Aid. Upon retirement, Lacey served as director of the national charity Family Welfare Association from 1969 to 1973 and reorganised the Churches' Council for Health and Healing between 1973 and 1977. In 1970, she authored the autobiographical book A Cup of Water, in which she expressed her views on aid, and wrote about her work. Late in life, the Socialist East End priest John Groser prepared Lacey for confirmation; she spent her retirement at her flat in Westminster.

== Personal life ==
She was appointed CBE in the 1960 Birthday Honours "for services to refugees". In 1975, Donald Coggan, the Archbishop of Canterbury, conferred the honorary Lambeth Doctorate of Divinity on her. On 11 July 1988, she died in a nursing home at Kensington. Lacey was unmarried.

== Personality and legacy ==
Eric James described Lacey as "tough and stocky; without being tall she confronted others as being a tower of strength. She was a formidable, autocratic leader, often infuriating, but her compassion in action caused even her critics to admire her." She termed the phrase "Need not creed" that became the slogan "epitomising the giving of aid by Christians after an era in which inspiration for sending money overseas had been prompted as much as by evangelism as by compassion." A photographic bromide portrait of Lacey taken by Hay Wrightson has been held in the collection of the National Portrait Gallery, London since its transfer from the Imperial War Museum in 1993.
