= Jennifer Marianne Hart =

Scottish women's rights activist

Jennifer Marianne Hart (15 December 1916 – 7 November 1997) also known as Maidie Bridge (maiden name) or Maidie Hart, was born in Brookfield, Renfrewshire, Scotland and died in Edinburgh at the age of 80. She was a campaigner for equality, development and peace.

== Life ==
Hart was the daughter of Jennifer Gibson, and Norman Cressy Bridge who was a consultant electrical engineer. Her father was the senior partner of consulting engineers, Strain and Robertson. She was educated at St Columba’s school, and at the University of St Andrews, where she graduated with first-class honours in English. There she met fellow student, William Douglas (Bill) Hart. They married in 1941. They had two daughters, Constance Hart and Jennifer Hart.

She was an activist whose quest for equal rights saw her work extensively with the World Council of Churches (WCC). From early days in the playgroup movement, through work with the Church of Scotland – she was President of the Woman’s Guild in the 1970s – to ecumenical involvement with the WCC, she followed her belief that women, too, are made in the image of God.

After attending the WCC Vienna conference on human rights in 1982, she became a founder member of the Ecumenical Forum of European Christian Women. She also served as a Vice-President of the British Council of Churches from 1978 to 1981, and of Scottish Churches Council, from 1982 to1986. As an Executive member of the UK Women’s National Commission (the independent advisory group to the UK Government on women’s issues) she chaired the Steering Committee for the UN International Women's Year 1975 events in Scotland.

In 1997, the Scottish Convention of Women (SCOW) was founded, Maidie Hart being one of the founders, after the International Women's Year (1975) and the London-based Women's National Commission, SCOW had a small membership of trade union representatives, local group members including the Women's Guilds and other individuals. They had the aim of promoting the quality of life for all women and men. SCOW circulated a questionnaire to the political parties to discover what they were thinking of in terms of women's representation. SCOW’s work was carried forward after 1992 by bodies including the Scottish Joint Action Group, Women’s Forum Scotland, Engender, the Network of Ecumenical Women in Scotland (NEWS) and the now government-supported Scottish Women’s Convention.
