= Christian Aid =

Charity of the UK and Ireland

- Founded: 1945
- Type: NGO
- Registration no.: UK (1105851)
- Location: Interchurch House, 35 Lower Marsh, London, SE1 7RL, UK
- Origins: London, England (UK)
- Region served: Worldwide
- Chief Executive: Patrick Watt
- Website: www.christianaid.org.uk

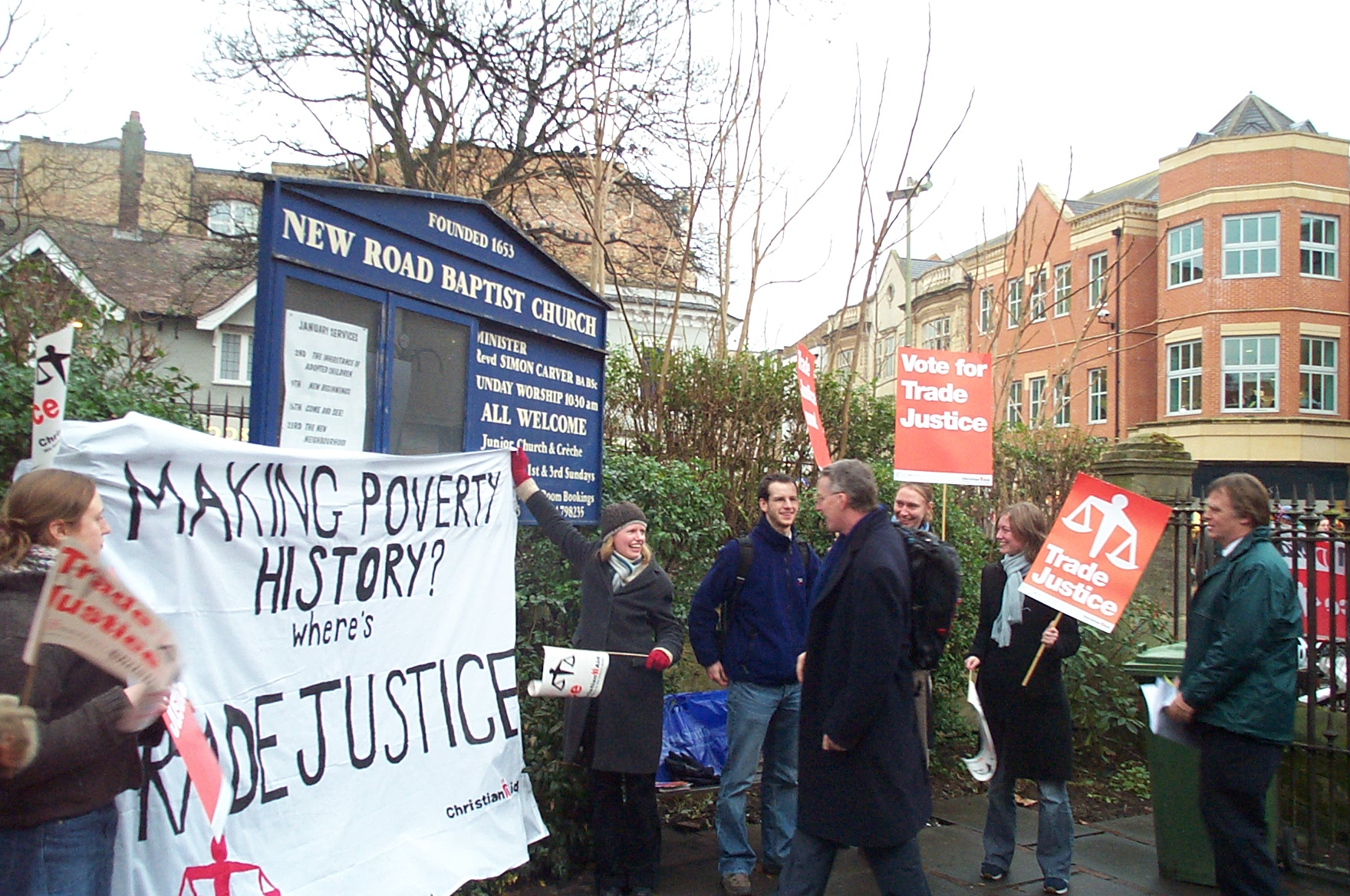
Activists from Christian Aid lobbying for trade justice

Christian Aid is a relief and development charity of 41 Christian (Protestant and Orthodox) churches in Great Britain and Ireland, and works to support sustainable development, eradicate poverty, support civil society and provide disaster relief in South America, the Caribbean, Africa and Asia.

It works with hundreds of local partner organisations in some of the world's most vulnerable communities across 24 countries. It is a founder member of the Disasters Emergency Committee, and a major member of The Climate Coalition, The Fairtrade Foundation and Trade Justice Movement campaigns. Christian Aid's headquarters are in London and it has regional teams across the UK and Ireland, plus country offices elsewhere around the world. Christian Aid also organises the UK's largest door-to-door collection, Christian Aid Week, which takes place in May each year.

Its director was Loretta Minghella who was appointed in 2010 but resigned in 2017 to work for the Church Commissioners. Amanda Khozi Mukwashi was Chief Executive in from 2018 to 2021. She was succeeded by the current Chief Executive Patrick Watt. The 2012–2013 income of Christian Aid was £95.4 million.

== Fundraising ==
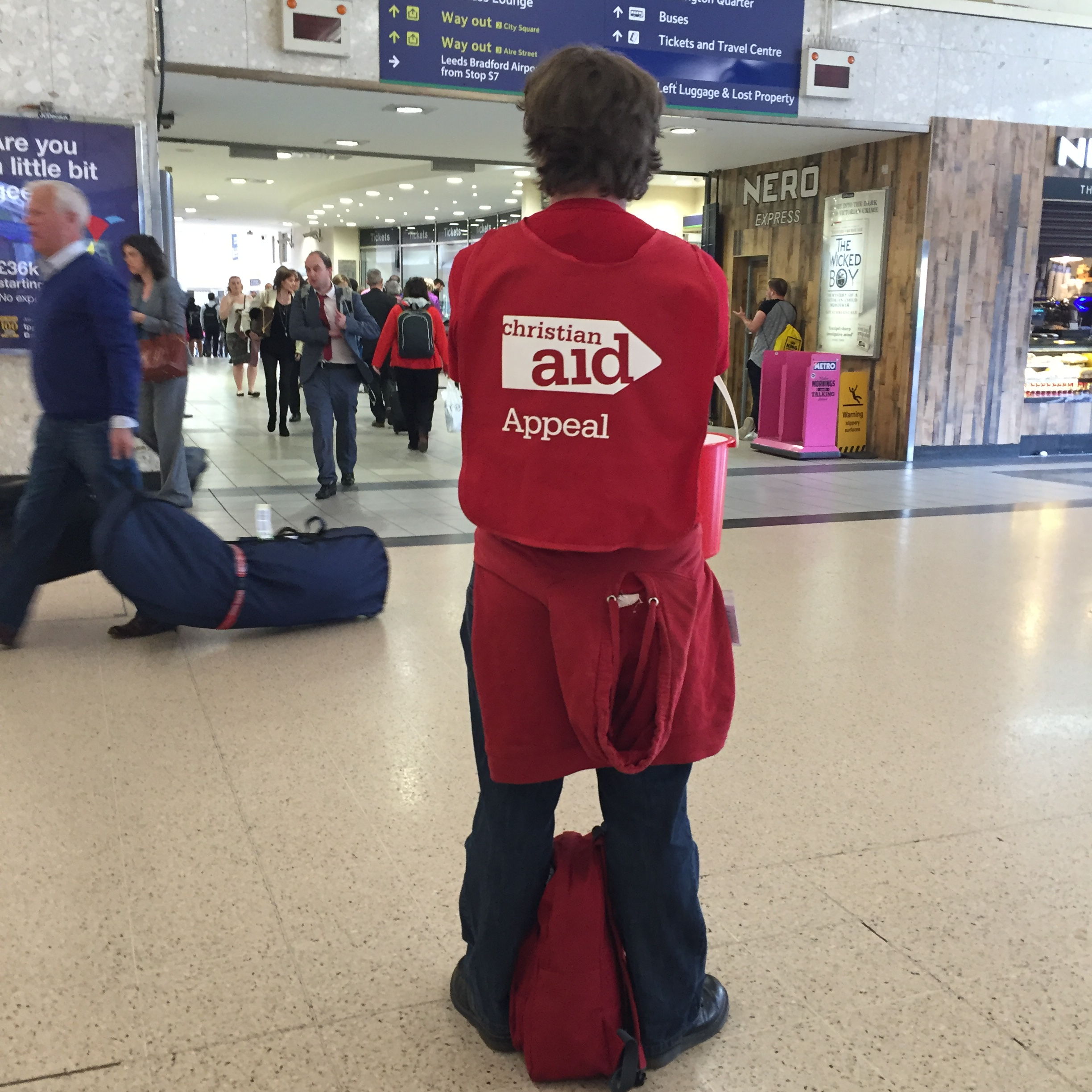
A Christian Aid volunteer soliciting donations in May 2016

Christian Aid raises income from a wide number of sources, such as institutional grants, regular gifts, the Christian Aid Week appeal, general donations, legacies, and emergency appeals. In 2013, the institutional income, part of which comes from the Department for International Development and the European Commission, constituted 41% of the total income. A significant percentage of the remaining income comes from thousands of individuals in churches and communities. The main fundraising moments include Christmas, Harvest, and Christian Aid Week. In 2013, £12.6 million (or 13% of the total income) was raised during this week. Throughout the year supporters give regularly using direct debit, cash donations, and Will Aid. Churches and community groups also take part in the annual calendar of events (e.g., walks, soup lunches, and quizzes).

== Development activities ==
The charity supports social and economic development activities in a number of countries, often undertaken in conjunction with a local partner.

Major projects which have been supported include reconstruction after various wars in Vietnam, Laos and Cambodia and aid provision offered after the overthrow of dictators Idi Amin in Uganda, Somoza family in Nicaragua, and Pol Pot in Cambodia. Yanomami Indians in Brazil were also supported, in a commitment to marginalized peoples.

== Campaigns ==
Christian Aid is currently (2026) campaigning for debt reduction in Kenya and elsewhere, calling on the UK government to take legislative action for debt justice.

Following an earlier campaign against reducing trade barriers in Africa, the development economist Paul Collier suggested in his book The Bottom Billion that Christian Aid had "deeply misinformed" the UK electorate in its 2004-2005 campaign. He said that the campaign was based on a "deeply misleading" study conducted by an economist without the requisite expertise and whose purported review "by a panel of academic experts" was undertaken by two people whom the economist had himself chosen and who were also "not noted for their expertise on international trade". He quotes an unnamed official at the British Department of Trade and Industry as saying "they know it's bad, but it sells the T-shirts".

== Criticisms ==
=== Executive pay ===
Several of the Britain's leading foreign aid charities, including Christian Aid, British Red Cross, Save the Children, and Oxfam, have been criticized for paying what some alleged to be excessive salaries to some of their managers. In 2013, Christian Aid's CEO was paid £126,206 and four other staff members were paid between £80,000 and £90,000. Christian Aid's response to this was: "We want to reassure you that we make every effort to avoid paying higher salaries than are necessary. We pay our staff salaries the same as, or below, the median of other church-based and/or international development agencies."

=== Legal action by Zionist Advocacy Center ===
In March 2023 Christian Aid commented on a legal action taken against the organisation by the Zionist Advocacy Center. The legal action was commenced in 2017. The legal action alleged that Christian Aid was "virulently anti-Israel" and had fraudulently obtained funding from the US government. Patrick Watt, the chief executive for Christian Aid, said: "I don't believe ... this case was brought against us in the belief that it had legs. I think it was brought against us in an effort to throw sand in the wheels of our advocacy and to make working on IOPT [Israel and the occupied Palestinian territory] very expensive." The case was dismissed in a US court in June 2021 "for lack of personal jurisdiction", without reaching the merits of the case. Christian Aid said it was an act of "lawfare" against organizations that help Palestinians, while the director of the plaintiff said "Only when it appears to me that organisations have crossed the line into actionable conduct do I start legal proceedings. Moreover, on two occasions so far [including against Norwegian People's Aid], the United States government has agreed with me, resulting in millions of dollars in recoveries."

== Sponsoring churches ==
The charity is acts as the "official relief, development and advocacy agency" of its 41 sponsoring churches in Britain and Ireland:

- Baptist Union of Great Britain
- Baptist Union of Scotland
- Baptist Union of Wales
- Cherubim and Seraphim Council of Churches
- Church in Wales
- Church of England
- Church of God of Prophecy
- Church of Ireland
- Church of Scotland
- Congregational Federation
- Council of African and Afro-Caribbean Churches
- Council of Oriental Orthodox Christian Churches
- Countess of Huntingdon's Connexion
- Fellowship of the Churches of Christ
- Free Church of England
- Greek Orthodox Church
- Independent Methodist Churches
- International Ministerial Council of Great Britain
- Joint Council for Anglo-Caribbean Churches
- Lutheran Council of Great Britain
- Methodist Church
- Methodist Church in Ireland
- Moravian Church of Great Britain and Ireland
- New Assembly of Churches
- New Testament Assembly
- New Testament Church of God
- Non-Subscribing Presbyterian Church of Ireland
- Old Baptist Union
- Presbyterian Church in Ireland
- Presbyterian Church of Wales
- Religious Society of Friends in Britain
- Religious Society of Friends in Ireland
- Russian Orthodox Church
- Salvation Army (UK Territory)
- Scottish Episcopal Church
- Seventh-day Adventist Church
- Union of Welsh Independents
- Unitarian and Free Christian Churches
- United Free Church of Scotland
- United Reformed Church
- Wesleyan Holiness Church

== See also ==
- The Climate Coalition
- 'Trade Justice' campaigns
