= Churches Together in Britain and Ireland =

Christian organisation in the British Isles

Churches Together in Britain and Ireland (CTBI) is an ecumenical organisation. The members include most of the major churches in England, Scotland, Wales and Ireland. CTBI is registered at Companies House with number 05661787. Its office is in Central London. In early 2026 the General Secretary is Nicola Brady, who succeeded Bob Fyffe.

It was formed on 1 September 1990, as the successor to the British Council of Churches, and was formerly known as the Council of Churches for Britain and Ireland.

Its stated aims are to "serve the churches of the four nations on their shared journey towards full visible unity in Christ" and works in areas of Faith and Order, Mission, Inter Faith, Church and Society, Racial Justice, International Affairs and International Students. It also produces material for the "Week of Prayer for Christian Unity" and "Racial Justice Sunday".

CTBI works closely with Action of Churches Together in Scotland, Churches Together in England, Cytûn (Churches Together in Wales), and the Irish Council of Churches. CTBI, unlike its predecessor the British Council of Churches, includes the Catholic Bishops' Conferences of England and Wales and of Scotland as full members, and the Catholic Bishops' Conference of Ireland as an Associate Member.

== The members of CTBI ==
In early 2026, the membership includes;

- Apostolic Pastoral Congress
- Armenian Orthodox Church
- Baptist Union of Great Britain
- Catholic Bishops’ Conference of England and Wales
- Catholic Bishops’ Conference of Scotland
- Cherubim and Seraphim Council of Churches
- Churches in Communities International
- Church in Wales
- Church of England
- Church of God of Prophecy
- Church of Ireland
- Church of Scotland
- Congregational Federation
- Coptic Orthodox Church
- Evangelische Synode Deutscher Sprache in Grossbritannien
- Independent Methodist Churches
- International Ministerial Council of Great Britain
- Irish Catholic Bishops’ Conference
- Joint Council for Anglo-Caribbean Churches
- The Lutheran Council of Great Britain
- The Mar Thoma Church
- Methodist Church in Britain
- Methodist Church in Ireland
- Moravian Church
- New Testament Assembly
- New Testament Church of God
- Oecumenical Patriarchate (Archdiocese of Thyateira and Great Britain)
- Presbyterian Church of Wales
- Redeemed Christian Church of God
- Catholic Church in England and Wales
- Catholic Church in Scotland
- Religious Society of Friends (Quakers)
- Romanian Orthodox Church
- Salvation Army
- Scottish Episcopal Church
- Serbian Orthodox Church
- Union of Welsh Independents
- United Free Church of Scotland
- United Reformed Church

Associate Members

- Catholic Church in Ireland
- Seventh-day Adventist Church

Several agencies, including CAFOD and the Bible Society, are also associated with the organisation in 2026.

== See also ==
- Conference of European Churches
- World Council of Churches
- Christian Aid
- The Council of Christians and Jews (CCJ)
- Churches Mutual Credit Union
- Jennifer Marianne Hart
