= Stanley Andrew Morrison =

Irish religious missionary (1894–1956)

Stanley Andrew Morrison (March 25, 1894 – July 14, 1956) was an Irish religious missionary known for his contributions in pushing for religious freedom and coordinating humanitarian efforts in the Middle East. He began his work for the Church Mission Society (CMS) in Cairo, becoming the mission's leader. Morrison advocated for the protection of religious freedoms to ensure the ability of Christians to freely practice their religion. Towards the end of his life, Morrison moved to Gaza, where he helpe refugees during the 1948 Arab-Israeli War.

== Early life ==
Stanley Andrew Morrison was born on March 25, 1894, in Liverpool, England. He was born to an Irish family with his father, Hugh Morrison, an officer at a customs house and a Sunday school teacher, and his mother, Minnie Morrison.

At 18, Morrison attended Oxford University on a non-collegiate scholarship to study Roman and Greek mythology. During his time at Oxford, Morrison also participated in the work of the Children's Special Service Mission. In 1919, Morrison combined his interests in missions abroad and working with youth by registering with the CMS with a focus on youth work. Morrison's initial work with the CMS was focused on running activities for youth abroad.

== Career ==
After a year of service with the CMS, Morrison shifted his focus from youth work to religious missionary work in Cairo. Morrison arrived in Cairo on September 27, 1920. Morrison thought that the predominantly Muslim countries in the Middle East had the misconception that Christianity was a religion associated with militantism, imperialism, and racism. In May 1921, Morrison joined the Egypt Inter-Mission Council as a CMS representative. This council was created to protect religious freedoms in any treaties made between Egypt and Britain. Morrison also participated in the International Missionary Council (IMC), created in 1921, to foster cooperation and communication between different missions. In 1928, the IMC hosted a two-week conference in Jerusalem where Morrison represented Egypt.

In 1929, Morrison was named the secretary of the CMS Cairo mission. In this role, he was in charge of the administrative and logistical tasks associated with missions in the region.

Morrison created the Missions and Government Committee of the Egypt Inter-Mission Council. This committee’s primary role was to represent all the major Churches in creating a standardized syllabus to teach Christianity in missionary schools in Egypt. In 1932, Morrison moved for British support for Egyptian protection of religious freedom by lobbying the British ambassador to Egypt, but the ambassador refused to act. Morrison used his newly created Missions and Government Committee as a vehicle for this advocacy work. In 1936 and 1937, amid renewed Anglo-Egyptian treaty negotiations, Morrison again pushed for British representatives in Egypt and the Egyptian government to enact religious safeguards, but he was again ignored.

In 1940, Morrison argued in a letter to fellow Missionary William Paton, IMC London secretary, that the IMC should start a “charter of freedom” that countries worldwide would sign declaring religious freedom. However, similar to all previous attempts, Morrison was unable to make much progress in advocating for religious freedoms. In January 1942, Morrison participated in a joint committee on religious liberty held by the Federal Council of the Churches of Christ (FCC) and Foreign Missions Conference (FMC). In May 1942, Morrison submitted a proposal to this joint committee that suggested establishing a new world organization in place of the League of Nations with a bureau dedicated to mediating religious disputes.

Following World War 2, Morrison was concerned about the rise of Arab nationalism in the Middle East and the creation of what he viewed as totalitarian governments. Morrison began focusing more on the Middle East, specifically Israel and the Gaza Strip. By May 1951, Morrison left Cairo for Gaza. Morrison voiced his views in his 1954 book titled Middle East Tensions: Political, Social, and Religious.

As a leader of CMS relief efforts in Gaza from 1951-1954, Morrison assisted homeless refugees by providing aid and ensuring basic shelter. He worked with Janet Lacey, the secretary of the Inter-Church Aid and Refugee Service of the British Council of Churches. Morrison also managed the CMS hospital in Gaza, Al-Ahli Arab Hospital. Morrison managed the hospital during a time in which it was seeing monthly the number of patients it previously saw yearly.

In 1954, Morrison moved from Gaza to Kenya. He served as the General Secretary of the Christian Council of Kenya and helped Kenyans held in rehabilitation and detention camps, provided relief to Kenyans following the Mau Mau rebellion, and initiated research regarding problems arising from the rebellion.

=== Publications ===
- Near East. Morrison, Stanley Andrew. United Kingdom: Highway Press, 1955.
- Middle East Tensions: Political, Social, and Religious, Morrison, Stanley Andrew. United Kingdom: Harper, 1954.
- The Way of Partnership. With the C.M.S. in Egypt and Palestine, Etc. [With Plates and Maps.]. Morrison, Stanley Andrew. United Kingdom: London, 1936.
- Religious Liberty in Syria and Palestine, Morrison, Stanley Andrew. 1933.
- Cairo how to See it in Four Days. Morrison, Stanley Andrew. Egypt: C.M.S. Book Shop, 1930.

== Personal life ==
In 1930, Morrison married Margaret Amy Girling, another missionary in Cairo.

Morrison died on July 14, 1956, at 62.
