= Properties and finances of the Church of England =

The question of the properties and finances of the Church of England has been publicly raised in the twenty-first century because the declining number of regular parishioners in the United Kingdom cannot continue to finance the large amount of real estate controlled by the church.

== Sources of income ==
=== Endowment ===
The Church of England has a large endowment of £8.7 billion which generates approximately £1 billion a year in income (2019), this is their largest source of revenue. The 2019 Financial report showed that the size of the endowment has been steady or growing slightly in recent years, delivering a return of 10% (2019). In recent years, efforts have been made to make the Church's investments more ethical, by divesting from major arms manufacturers and divesting all fossil fuel investments in 2020. The Church of England has been criticized in the past for investments in arms dealers, unethical loan companies and companies with poor environmental records.

The Church's Endowment fund is invested in a diversified portfolio across a broad range of asset classes. This includes a variety of equity investments in publicly listed and private companies as well as commercial/residential property and land.

=== Donations ===
The Church of England generates approximately £329 million from churchgoers' donations; this corresponds to approximately £15 per week per donor.

=== Government support ===
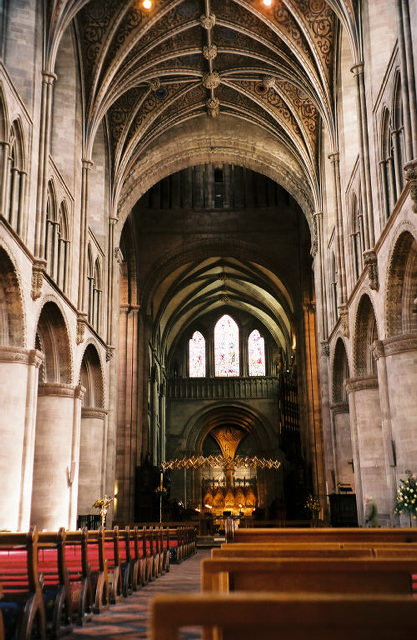
Hereford is one of the church's forty-three cathedrals, many with histories stretching back centuries

Donations comprise its primary source of income, though it also relies heavily on the income from its various endowments. In 2005 the Church of England had estimated total outgoings of around £900 million.

On 17 May 2012 the Church of England welcomed an agreement with the government over the future funding of alterations and repairs to its 12,500 listed buildings, providing an extra £30 million a year on top of the £12 million already granted by the government to the Church of England in the Listed Places of Worship Grant Scheme (LPWGS). The LPWGS provides grants for qualifying work to churches which are equal to the amount of VAT paid for that work, thus alleviating the burden of VAT on the cost of maintaining churches. There is no other government financial support for the Church of England.

=== Funding from parishes ===
Historically, individual parishes both raised and spent the vast majority of the church's funding, meaning that clergy pay depended on the wealth of the parish. The parish advowsons (the right to appoint clergy to particular parishes) could, therefore, become valuable gifts. Individual dioceses also held considerable assets: the Diocese of Durham possessed such vast wealth and temporal power that its bishop became known as a "Prince-Bishop". Since the mid-19th century the church has made various moves to "equalise" the situation and clergy within each diocese now receive standard stipends paid from diocesan funds.

=== Church Commissioners ===
Meanwhile, the church moved the majority of its income-generating assets (which in the past included a great deal of land, but today mostly take the form of financial stocks and bonds) out of the hands of individual clergy and bishops to the care of a body called the Church Commissioners, which uses these funds to pay a range of non-parish expenses, including clergy pensions and the expenses of cathedrals and bishops' houses. These funds amount to around £8 billion and generate income of around £260 million each year (as of 2003), around a fifth of the church's overall income.

== Financing ==
=== Grants to local parishes ===
The Church Commissioners give some of this money as grants to local parishes to fund mission projects, but the majority of the financial burden of church upkeep and the work of local parishes still rests with individual parishes and dioceses, which meet their requirements from donations. Direct donations to the church (not including legacies) come to around £460 million per year, while parish and diocesan reserve funds generate another £100 million. Funds raised in individual parishes account for almost all of this money and the majority of it remains in the parish which raises it, meaning that the resources available to parishes still vary enormously according to the level of donations they can raise.

=== Quotas and parish shares ===
Most parishes give a portion of their money to the diocese as a "quota" or "parish share". While this is not a compulsory payment, dioceses strongly encourage and rely on it being paid; it is usually only withheld by parishes either if they are unable to find the funds or as a specific act of protest. As well as paying central diocesan expenses such as the running of diocesan offices, these diocesan funds also provide clergy pay and housing expenses (which total around £260 million per year across all dioceses), meaning that clergy living conditions no longer depend on parish-specific fundraising.

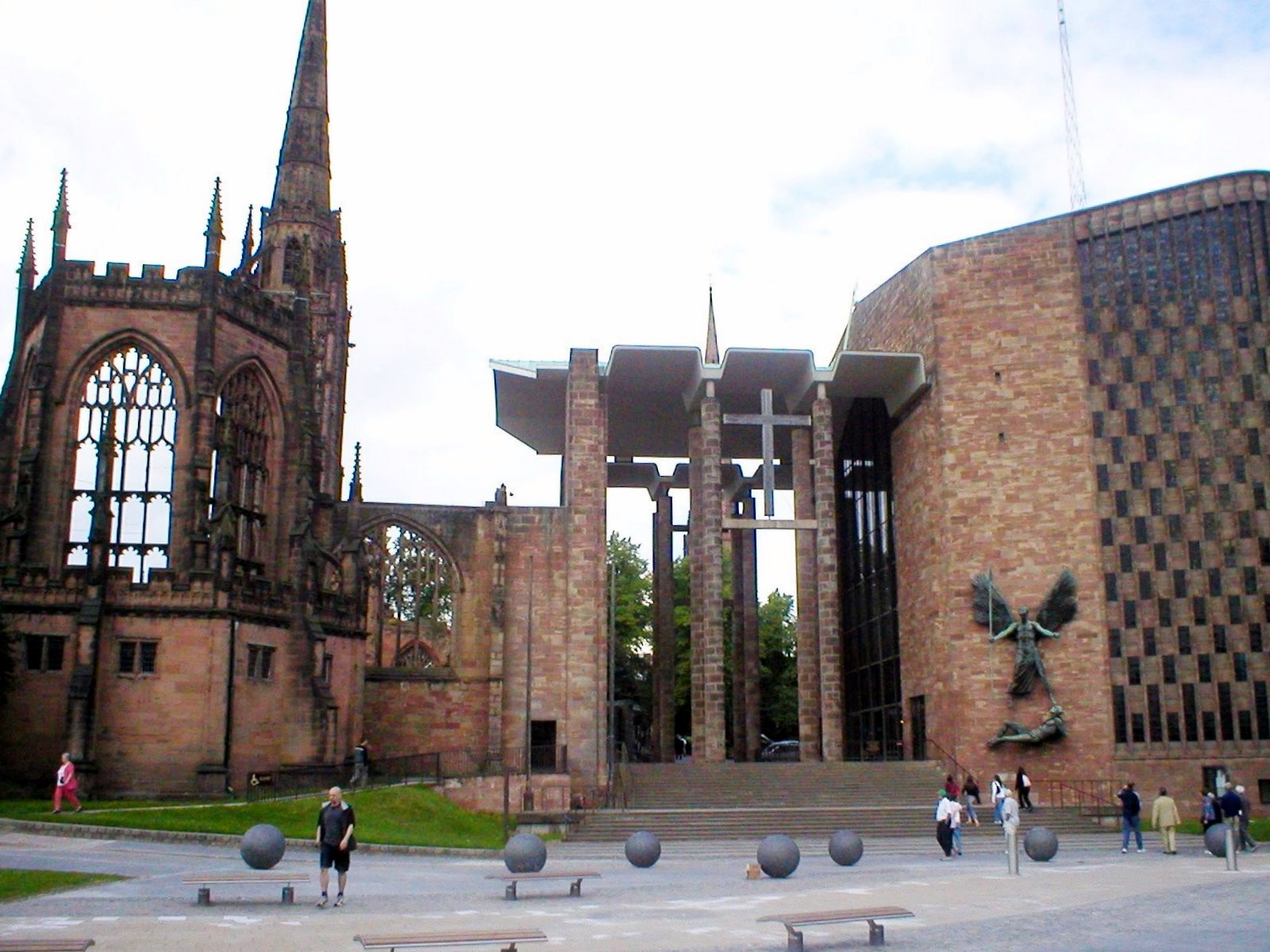
The old and new Coventry Cathedrals in the Diocese of Coventry. The new cathedral was built next to the ruins of the old, which was destroyed in the Second World War

=== Maintaining 13,000 Anglican parishes ===
Although asset-rich, the Church of England has to maintain its thousands of churches nationwide. The Church of England has some 16,000 church buildings, in 13,000 parishes covering the whole of England, as well as 43 cathedrals. Together they form a unique collection of buildings; between 12,000 and 13,000 churches are listed, i.e. are recognised by the government as being of exceptional historic or architectural importance. About 45% of all Grade I buildings in England are churches. Though first and foremost a place of worship, churches are also often the oldest building in a settlement still in continual use. Even in industrial or 20th century settlements, they are a focus.

== Economics of the buildings ==
=== Problems at maintaining economic self-sufficiency ===
Many churches – and cathedrals particularly – are the largest, most architecturally complex, most archaeologically sensitive and most visited building in their village, town or city. As current congregation numbers stand at relatively low levels and as maintenance bills increase as the buildings grow older, many of these churches cannot maintain economic self-sufficiency but their historical and architectural importance make it difficult to sell them. In the twenty-first century, cathedrals and other famous churches have met some of their maintenance costs with grants from organisations such as English Heritage, but congregations and local fundraisers must pay the entire bill for most small parish churches.

=== Ancillary buildings ===
In addition to consecrated buildings, the Church of England also controls numerous ancillary buildings attached to or associated with churches, including a good deal of clergy housing. As well as vicarages and rectories, this housing includes residences (often called "palaces") for each of the church's 43 diocesan bishops. In some cases, this name seems entirely apt; buildings such as the Archbishop of Canterbury's Lambeth Palace in London and the Old Palace at Canterbury have truly palatial dimensions, while the Bishop of Durham's Auckland Castle has 50 rooms, a banqueting hall and 30 acres (12 ha) of parkland. However, many bishops have found the older palaces inappropriate for today's lifestyles and some "palaces" are ordinary four bedroomed houses. Many dioceses which have retained large palaces now employ part of the space as administrative offices, while the bishops and their families live in a small apartment within the palace.

=== Palaces turned into conference centres ===
In recent years some dioceses have managed to put their palaces' excess space and grandeur to profitable use as conference centres. All three of the more grand bishop's palaces mentioned above – Lambeth Palace, the Old Palace and Auckland Castle – serve as offices for church administration and conference venues and only in a lesser degree as the personal residence of a bishop. The size of the bishops' households has shrunk dramatically and their budgets for entertaining and staff form a tiny fraction of the levels before the 20th century.

== See also ==
- Churches Mutual Credit Union
