= Children's Special Service Mission =

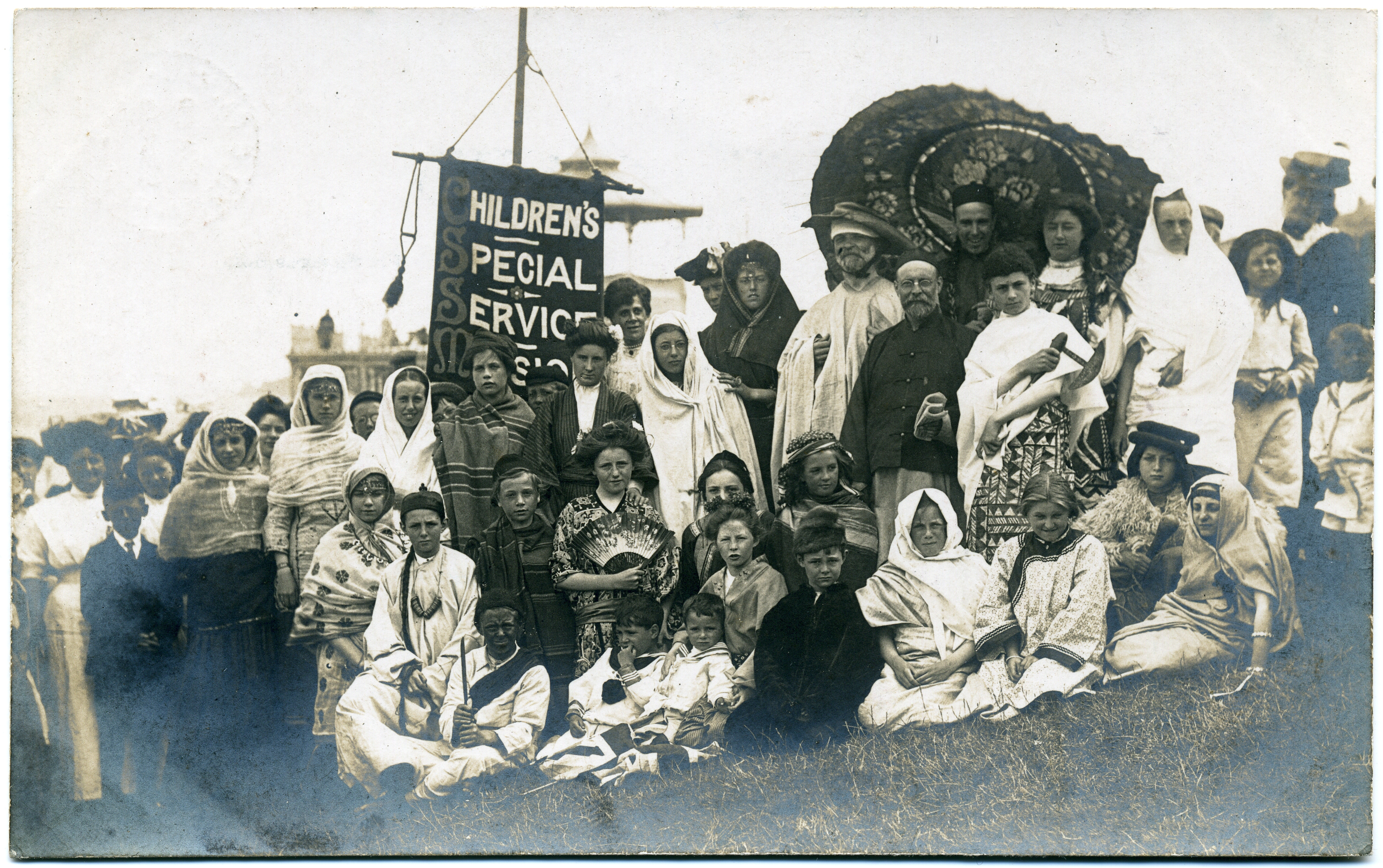
Postcard photo of children in fancy dress for Children's Special Service Mission, on the Downs in east Herne Bay, with the Pavilion (now the King's Hall) in the background. (1913 or before by Frederick Christian Palmer).

Children's Special Service Mission was the original name, from 1867, of the organisation now called Scripture Union. Begun by Thomas 'Pious' Hughes and Josiah Spiers in Islington, London, this evangelical Christian movement was less formal than the Sunday Schools of the day and attracted children who in turn brought their friends. Several notable people have participated in this mission of the likes of Stanley Andrew Morrison.

CSSM grew into an international movement that included missions in buildings, and beach missions.

== Beach Mission ==
Arguably the most visible mission operated by CSSM and now Scripture Union has been the beach mission.

Volunteers from different Christian churches go on mission together, set up large tents at popular seaside sites where people spend summer holidays, typically for two weeks. Missioners typically live in tent and caravan parks, in accommodation tents, and have marquees that are used for daytime and night meetings and activities for the children and adults. In certain towns, like Sheringham in Norfolk, the volunteers lived in large houses offered free by the owners.

A typical week day would start at 8.00 a.m. with 'Gold Diggers' where a volunteer and a small class of children would meet and discuss a short section of the Bible. From this section everyone would then pick a 'password' - which was a sentence or part thereof of the section. Throughout the day attending children and volunteers would challenge each other to remember both the password and where in the Bible it came from. Later on in the morning there would be a service on the beach. The pulpit would be made of sand and a text would be added made up of brightly painted metal bottle tops. Instead of hymns, short choruses would be sung by all those attending. A story would be told by the volunteer chosen to host the service of the day.

Some beach missions also make use of nearby church halls for teenage activities, such as a coffee shop or to stage a dance.

=== Missioners ===
Participants are organised under a leader whose task it is to manage the camp and its activities. Sub-leaders take responsibility for various aspects, such as: young children's activities, Primary School age activities, teenage activities, tents, cooking, cleaning, materials (printed and otherwise), music, and so on.
