= Churchland =

Churchland may refer to:

- Churchland (surname)
- Churchland pear
- Churchland High School, in Portsmouth, Virginia
- Churchland, North Carolina

== See also ==
- Churchlands, Western Australia
  - Churchlands Senior High School
- Electoral district of Churchlands, an electorate of the Western Australian Legislative Assembly
