= Churchland (surname) =

Churchland is a surname. Notable people with the surname include:

- Anne Churchland, Canadian neuroscientist
- Marian Churchland (born 1982), Canadian comic book artist
- Patricia Churchland (born 1943), Canadian philosopher
- Paul Churchland (born 1942), Canadian philosopher
