= Amanda Khozi Mukwashi =

Resident Coordinator in Lesotho, United Nations

Amanda Khozi Mukwashi is the United Nations Resident Coordinator in Lesotho and the former chief executive officer of Christian Aid.

== Life ==
She graduated from the University of Warwick and from the University of Zambia. Prior to working for Christian Aid, she worked for the Voluntary Services Organization.

Her work has appeared in the Guardian.

She helped to organize events leading up to the 2021 United Nations Climate Change Conference, including a march by Young Christian Climate Network, an artwork installation in St Paul's Cathedral, and a national Climate Sunday event in Glasgow Cathedral.

As of October 2021, she stepped down as the chief executive officer of Christian Aid to take up the role of United Nations Resident Coordinator in Lesotho. She has worked for this organization for more than 20 years.

== Works ==
- "But where are you really from? : on identity, humanhood and hope" : Society for Promoting Christian Knowledge, 2020. ISBN 9780281085415
