= International Ministerial Council of Great Britain =

Christian denomination in Great Britain

The International Ministerial Council of Great Britain (formerly the Shiloh United Church of Christ) is a Christian denomination in Great Britain. Set up in 1968, it is a membership body for black and minority ethnic Pentecostal churches, with the aim of fostering unity, respect, and understanding. It is a member of Churches Together in England. It is designated as a church to which the Church of England (Ecumenical Relations) Measure 1988 applies, and was recognised as a religious body by the UK Border Agency which has now been superseded by UK Visas and Immigration.
