= Churches Mutual Credit Union =

Churches' Mutual Credit Union
- Founded: 2014
- Type: Industrial and Provident Society
- Headquarters: Centenary House, Centenary Way, Manchester, M50 1RF
- Website: churchesmutual.co.uk

Churches Mutual Credit Union Limited is a not-for-profit member-owned financial co-operative, based in Manchester and operating throughout the United Kingdom. It has in excess of 1,500 members and assets of £5 million.

== History ==
Arising from a consultation among Church of England clergy on pensions and retirement housing, the credit union was formed in collaboration by the Church of England, the Church of Scotland, the Methodist Church of Great Britain, the Church in Wales and the Scottish Episcopal Church in 2014. In 2016, the General Assembly of the United Reformed Church agreed to join, and, in 2017, the common bond was extended to the Roman Catholic Church in England and Wales and in Scotland.

== Activities ==
Membership of Churches Mutual Credit Union is currently restricted by common bond to individuals holding a recognised position within the Anglican churches of Great Britain, the (presbyterian) Church of Scotland, the Methodist, United Reformed and Catholic churches in either a paid or voluntary capacity. Parishes, dioceses and charities may join corporately. The credit union also has a lobbying role and aims to eventually offer the service to all active members of the churches.

A member of the Association of British Credit Unions Limited, registered under the Industrial and Provident Societies Acts, Churches Mutual Credit Union is authorised by the Prudential Regulation Authority and regulated by the Financial Conduct Authority and PRA. Ultimately, like the banks and building societies, members' savings are protected against business failure by the Financial Services Compensation Scheme.

== See also ==
- Credit unions in the United Kingdom
- British co-operative movement
