= Percival Smith =

English clergyman (1898-1965)

Harry Kingsley Percival Smith (5 June 1898 – 27 January 1965) was Archdeacon of Lynn from 1956 until 1961.

He was educated at Haileybury; Gonville and Caius College, Cambridge and Westcott House, Cambridge. During World War I he served with the Northamptonshire Regiment. He was ordained in 1922 and began his ecclesiastical career with Curacies in Cambridge, London and Maidstone. After this he was Priest in charge of St Mary of Nazareth, West Wickham then held incumbencies at Yaxley, Fenstanton, Blofield and Foulsham before his Archdeacon’s appointment. From 1961 he was Adviser on Christian Stewardship to the Diocese of Norwich. Before the Second World War he was an avowed admirer of Hitler and attended a conference in the summer of 1939 in Berlin organised by the Anglo German Brotherhood.

However, as Julia Boyd observes in her book Travelling in The Third Reich, "his enthusiasm for Nazi Germany did nothing to damage his career."

== Notes ==
Church of England titles
Preceded by William Ralph Musselwhite	Archdeacon of Lynn; 1956–1961	Succeeded by William Somers Llewellyn
