= Geoffrey Grobecker =

Geoffrey Frank Grobecker MBE (1922–1989) was Archdeacon of Lynn from 1980 until 1987.

He was educated at St Paul's; Queens' College, Cambridge; and Ridley Hall, Cambridge. He was ordained in 1950. After a curacy in Morden he was a Chaplain to the Forces from 1952 until 1977. He was Vicar of Swaffham from 1977 until 1980.

An Honorary Chaplain to the Queen, he died on 27 February 1989.

== Notes ==
Church of England titles
Preceded by William Aubrey Aitken	Archdeacon of Lynn; 1980–1987	Succeeded by Anthony Charles Foottit
