= Harry Radcliffe =

British clergyman (1867-1949)

Harry Sydney Radcliffe (7 May 1867 – 6 October 1949) was Archdeacon of Lynn from 1926 to 1946; and as such he played a leading role in the removal of the Rector of Stiffkey in 1932.

The fourth son of Sir David Radcliffe, Lord Mayor of Liverpool from 1884 to 1886, he was born in that city on 7 May 1867 and educated at its college. In 1884 he was commissioned as a volunteer officer into the Liverpool Rifles. He graduated from Exeter College, Oxford in 1893 and was ordained after a period of study at Leeds Clergy School two years later. Radcliffe began his ecclesiastical career with a curacy in Aspull. After this he was Rector of Gaywood, Norfolk from 1906 to 1946; and Rural Dean of Lynn from 1918 to 1926.

An authority on Norfolk Church plate, he died at Fakenham on 6 October 1949.

== Notes ==
Church of England titles
Preceded by John Phillips Allcot Bowers	Archdeacon of Lynn; 1926–1946	Succeeded by John Walker Woodhouse
