= William Musselwhite =

William Ralph Musselwhite, CVO (17 April 1887 – 28 September 1956) was Archdeacon of Lynn from 1953 until his death. He was born in Southsea, and was educated at the London College of Divinity. He was ordained in 1911. After curacies in Nottingham and Southsea he was Vicar of St Paul, Upper Norwood from 1919 to 1931; St John, Bromley, 1931 to 1939; St Peter Wolferton and St Felix Babingley from 1939. He was an Honorary Canon of Norwich from 1947 to 1953.

== Notes ==
Church of England titles
Preceded by John Walker Woodhouse	Archdeacon of Oakham; 1953–1956	Succeeded by Harry Kingsley Percival Smith
