= Alan Winton =

British Anglican bishop

The Right Reverend Alan Winton
- Bishop of Thetford
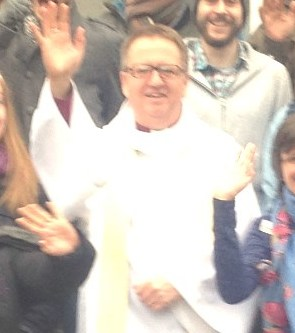
- Winton in 2014
- Church: Church of England
- Diocese: Diocese of Norwich
- In office: 2009–2023
- Predecessor: David Atkinson
- Successor: Ian Bishop
- Other posts: Acting Bishop of Norwich (2019); Rector/Team Rector of Welwyn (1999–2009)

Orders
- Ordination: 1991 (deacon) by Jim Thompson; 1992 (priest) by Brian Masters
- Consecration: 29 September 2009 by Rowan Williams

Personal details
- Born: 4 September 1958 (age 68) south London
- Denomination: Anglican
- Residence: Wymondham, Norfolk
- Spouse: Pippa (m. 1982)
- Children: two
- Education: Sheffield University

Alan Peter Winton (born 4 September 1958) is a retired bishop who served as Bishop of Thetford in the Church of England Diocese of Norwich.

== Education and family ==
Winton was born on 4 September 1958 in London, England. He was educated at Sheffield University, whence he was awarded his Bachelor of Arts (BA Hons) honours degree in Biblical Studies in 1983. He then studied for and received his Doctor of Philosophy (PhD) from that university in 1987, then trained for the ministry at Lincoln Theological College.

Winton married in 1982, and they have two children; his wife is also a priest. (Note: She was licensed a deaconess in 1983, a deacon in 1987 and a priest in 1994.)

== Ordained ministry ==
Winton was made a deacon at Petertide 1991 (29 June), by Jim Thompson, Bishop of Stepney, at St Paul's Cathedral, and ordained a priest the Petertide following (29 June 1992), by Brian Masters, Bishop of Edmonton, at All Hallows, Gospel Oak; his first (title) post was as assistant curate (1991–1995) of Christ Church Southgate, London. His first post of responsibility was priest in charge of St Paul's Walden with Preston, Hertfordshire (1995–1999), during which time he was simultaneously Continuing Ministerial Education (CME) Officer for that diocese. Finally (before his appointment to the episcopate) he served in Welwyn, first as Rector (1999–2005) of St Mary the Virgin, Welwyn, and of St Michael, Welwyn, with St Peter, Ayot St Peter; then as Team Rector (2005–2009) of the new Welwyn Team Ministry. During the latter part of that appointment, from 2007, he was also an honorary canon of St Albans Abbey.

In 2009, he was appointed to become Bishop of Thetford, one of the two suffragan bishops in the Diocese of Norwich. He was consecrated as bishop by Rowan Williams, Archbishop of Canterbury, on 29 September 2009 (Michaelmas), at St Paul's Cathedral. In November 2022, it was announced that he would retire at the end of April 2023.

=== Views ===
Winton voted in favour of the introduction of blessings for same-sex couples by the Church of England.

== Styles ==
- The Reverend Doctor Alan Winton (1991–2007)
- The Reverend Canon Doctor Alan Winton (2007–2009)
- The Right Reverend Doctor Alan Winton (2009–present)

== Notes ==
Church of England titles
Preceded by David Atkinson	Bishop of Thetford; 2009–2023	Succeeded by Ian Bishop
