= Henry Radclyffe =

Henry Radclyffe or Radcliffe may refer to:

- Henry Radclyffe, 2nd Earl of Sussex (1507–1557), son of Robert Radclyffe, 1st Earl of Sussex and Elizabeth Stafford, Countess of Sussex
- Henry Radclyffe, 4th Earl of Sussex (c. 1530–1593), English peer

== See also ==
- Harry Radcliffe, Church of England archdeacon
