= Bishop of Thetford =

Church of England suffragan bishop

The Bishop of Thetford is an episcopal title which takes its name after the market town of Thetford in Norfolk, England. The title was originally used by the Normans in the 11th century, and is now used by a Church of England suffragan bishop.

The present Bishop of Thetford is a suffragan bishop of the Church of England Diocese of Norwich, in the Province of Canterbury, England. The title was resurrected under the Suffragan Bishops Act 1534. The Bishop of Thetford, along with the Bishop of Lynn, assists the diocesan Bishop of Norwich in overseeing the diocese, and has particular oversight of the Archdeaconry of Norfolk.

Bishops of Thetford
From	Until	Incumbent	Notes
1536	1570	John Salisbury	Translated to Sodor and Man
1570	1894	in abeyance except that in 1694, George Hickes (Dean of Worcester) was consecrated nonjuring bishop of Thetford.	
1894	1903	Arthur Lloyd	Also Archdeacon of Lynn. Translated to Newcastle
1903	1926	John Bowers	Also Archdeacon of Lynn
1926	1945	no appointment	
1945	1953	John Woodhouse	
1953	1963	Martin Leonard	
1963	1976	Eric Cordingly	
1977	1981	Hugh Blackburne	
1981	1992	Timothy Dudley-Smith	
1992	2001	Hugo de Waal	
2001	2009	David Atkinson	
2009	2023	Alan Winton	Retired 30 April 2023.
2023	present	Ian Bishop	Consecrated 29 September 2023.
