= David Atkinson (bishop) =

Bishop of Thetford

The Right Reverend David Atkinson
- Bishop of Thetford
- Diocese: Norwich
- In office: 2001 – 16 September 2009 (retired)
- Predecessor: Hugo de Waal
- Successor: Alan Winton
- Other posts: Honorary assistant bishop in Southwark (2009–present); Archdeacon of Lewisham (1996–2001)

Orders
- Ordination: 1972 (deacon); 1973 (priest)
- Consecration: 2001

Personal details
- Born: 5 September 1943 (age 83)
- Denomination: Anglican
- Parents: Thomas Collins & Adèle
- Spouse: Susan (m. 1969)
- Children: 1 son; 1 daughter
- Profession: Academic & author (theology & ethics)
- Education: King's College, London

David John Atkinson (born 5 September 1943) is the former Bishop of Thetford.

== Early life and education ==
Atkinson was educated at Maidstone Grammar School and King's College London (he became an Associate of King's College {AKC} and, at other points, a Doctor of Philosophy {PhD}, Master of Letters {MLitt}, Oxford Master of Arts {MA Oxon}, and Bachelor of Science {BSc}). He had a short career as a chemistry teacher.

== Ordained ministry ==
Atkinson was ordained in 1973. His career began with a curacy at St Peter Halliwell, Bolton, after which he was Curate at St John, Harborne, Birmingham, and then Librarian at Latimer House, Oxford. From 1977 he was chaplain (and a Fellow) of Corpus Christi College, Oxford, and part-time Lecturer at Wycliffe Hall, then a canon residentiary at Southwark Cathedral and finally (before his elevation to the episcopate) Archdeacon of Lewisham.

He was Bishop of Thetford from 2001 to 2009. In 2009 he became an assistant bishop in the Diocese of Southwark. He has been Northrupp Visiting Professor at Hope College, Holland, Michigan, and Visiting Lecturer at St John's College, Hong Kong, and at the South Asia institute of Advanced Christian Studies. He is a member of the Society of Ordained Scientists, and has served on the Board of Operation Noah. Atkinson is married with two children and eight grandchildren. He retired on 16 September 2009.

On 11 February 2017, Atkinson was one of fourteen retired bishops to sign an open letter to the then-serving bishops of the Church of England. In an unprecedented move, they expressed their opposition to the House of Bishops' report to General Synod on sexuality, which recommended no change to the Church's canons or practices around sexuality. By 13 February, a serving bishop (Alan Wilson, Bishop of Buckingham) and nine further retired bishops had added their signatures; on 15 February, the report was rejected by synod.

== Bibliography ==
He has written a number of books on pastoral theology, Christian ethics and biblical studies.

- Prophecy, Grove 1977
- The Values of Science, Grove 1980
- Tasks for the Church in the Marriage Debate, Latimer 1979
- The Moral Teaching of the Apostle Paul, Christian Theology Trust 1991
- The Ethics of the Johannine Literature, Christian Theology Trust 1993
- Life and Death, Oxford University Press 1985
- To Have and To Hold: The Marriage Covenant and the Discipline of Divorce, Collins, and Eerdmans 1979
- Homosexuals in the Christian Fellowship, Latimer House and Eerdmans 1979
- Bible Speaks Today: Ruth, 1983
- Bible Speaks Today: Genesis 1–11, 1990
- Bible Speaks Today: Job, 1991
- Bible Speaks Today: Proverbs, 1996
- Peace in Our Time? (on nuclear deterrence) 1985
- Pastoral Ethics (textbook) 1989 revised SPCK 1994
- Counselling In Context (with Francis Bridger), Harper Collins 1994, re-issued Darton Longman and Todd 1998 *edited (with David Field) New Dictionary of Christian Ethics and Pastoral Theology, IVP 1995
- Jesus, Lamb of God, SPCK 1996
- God So Loved the World, (towards a missionary theology) SPCK 1999; chapter in Terry Brown (ed)
- Other Voices, Other Worlds, (DLT 2005)
- Renewing the Face of the Earth (pastoral and theological response to climate change) Canterbury Press 2008
- The Church's Healing Ministry – practical and pastoral reflections Canterbury Press 2011
- Hope Rediscovered – biblical wisdom for an anxious world Ekklesia Publishing 2018
- The Apocalypse of Jesus Christ Wipf and Stock 2020
- A Light for the Pathway: exploring the Psalms Wipf and Stock 2021

Articles

- Oxford Dictionary of the Christian Church
- Evangelical Dictionary of Ethics
- Blackwell Encyclopedia of Modern Christian Thought

Church of England titles
Preceded by Hugo de Waal	Bishop of Thetford; 2001–2009	Succeeded by Alan Winton
