= Hugo de Waal =

The Rt Revd Hugo de Waal MA(Cantab)
- Bishop of Thetford
- Diocese: Diocese of Norwich
- In office: 1992–2000 (retired)
- Predecessor: Timothy Dudley-Smith
- Successor: David Atkinson
- Other posts: Honorary assistant bishop in Europe (2002–2007); Principal, Ridley Hall, Cambridge (1978–1991)

Orders
- Ordination: 1960 (deacon); 1961 (priest)
- Consecration: 1992

Personal details
- Born: 16 March 1935 Jember Regency, Netherlands Indies (now Indonesia)
- Died: 6 January 2007 (aged 71) Bury St Edmunds, England, UK
- Denomination: Anglican
- Parents: Bernard & Albertine
- Spouse: Brigit Massingberd–Mundy (m. 1960)
- Children: 1 son; 3 daughters
- Education: Pembroke College, Cambridge

Hugo Ferdinand de Waal (16 March 1935 – 6 January 2007) was Principal of Ridley Hall, Cambridge from 1978 to 1991 and the suffragan Bishop of Thetford from 1992 until 2000.

He was born at Jember on East Java and educated at Tonbridge School and Pembroke College, Cambridge, before embarking on an ecclesiastical career with a curacy at St Martin in the Bull Ring after which he was Chaplain at his old college then Rector of Dry Drayton. Following this he was Vicar of St John the Evangelist, Blackpool and then (his final appointment before appointment to the episcopate) principal of Ridley Hall theological college in Cambridge (1978–91).

He was made a deacon on Trinity Sunday 1960 (12 June) at St James' Church, Handsworth and ordained a priest the Trinity Sunday following (28 May 1961) at St Augustine's Church, Edgbaston — both times by Leonard Wilson, Bishop of Birmingham; he was consecrated a bishop on 17 January 1992 at Westminster Abbey.

In retirement he continued to serve the Church as an honorary assistant bishop within the Diocese in Europe until his death.

Church of England titles
Preceded by Timothy Dudley-Smith	Bishop of Thetford; 1992–2000	Succeeded by David Atkinson
