= St Margaret's Church, Lowestoft =

Coordinates: 52.4864°N 1.7420°E

St. Margaret's Church
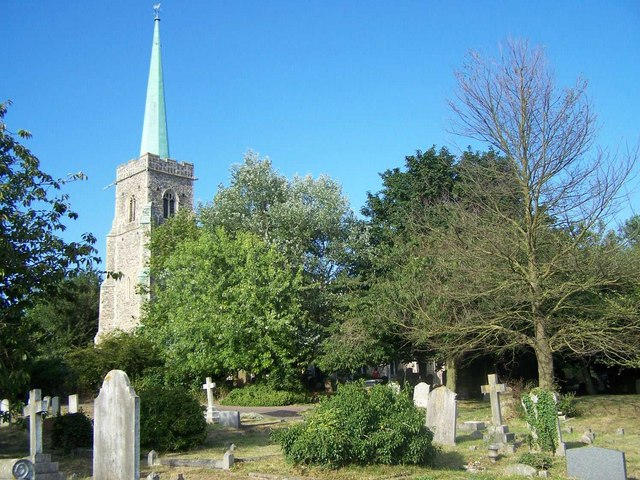
- St Margaret's Church, Lowestoft (July 2008)

- Location in Suffolk
- Location: Lowestoft, Suffolk
- Country: England
- Denomination: Anglican
- Website: www.stmargaretslowestoft.co.uk

Architecture
- Functional status: Active
- Heritage designation: Grade I listed building
- Designated: 13 December 1949

Administration
- Province: Canterbury
- Diocese: Norwich
- Archdeaconry: Norfolk
- Deanery: Lothingland
- Parish: Lowestoft St Margaret

Clergy
- Rector: Revd. Canon Simon Stokes

Saint Margaret's Church is the ancient parish church of Lowestoft in the English county of Suffolk. It is dedicated to St Margaret of Antioch and is notable for its large illuminated blue spire which can be seen across the town. The church is located on a hilltop on the north-western edge of the town centre and was used as a navigation landmark.

The church is within the deanery of Lothingland and archdeaconry of Norfolk. It falls within the Diocese of Norwich which extends into north Suffolk.

== History ==
The church is medieval and a Grade I listed building with an early 14th-century tower. It was founded by the Priory of St. Bartholomew in London which was granted the manor of Lowestoft in 1230 by Henry I. The church contains a wooden panel listing the parish priests since 1308.

The church is built of flint and was substantially enlarged during the 15th century, with the aisles and nave dating from this period. It was refurbished during the Victorian period and the needle spire rebuilt in 1954, replacing the previous wooden spire which dated from 1483. It contains the only known glasswork produced by Regency artist Robert Allen, installed in 1819. The east window glass dates from 1891 and the church also contains glasswork from St Peter's church, a daughter church of St Margaret's which was demolished in 1975.

== Incumbents ==
Vicars

- 1308 John Ayshle
- 1330 Richard De Walcote
- 1331 John De Garboldesham
- 1339 Matthew De Rollesby
- 1347 John Everard
- 1360 John De Welberham
- 1365 William Homfrey
- 1383 ...........Apostolicus
- 1385 William Smogget
- 1432 William Sekynton
- 1442 John Mildewell
- 1456 Thomas Shirecroft
- 1456 John Manyngham
- 1458 Idem
- 1478 Thomas Epis Dromorensis
- 1490 Robert Tomsen
- 1507 John Wheteacre
- 1508 Edward Lee
- 1510 John Bayly
- 1511 John Brown
- 1540 John Blomevyle
- 1555 Thomas Downing
- 1561 William Naysh
- 1574 William Bently
- 1603 John Gleson
- 1610 Robert Hawys
- ...... Francis Presse
- 1639 James Rowse
- 1664 Henry Yowell
- 1660 John Youell
- 1677 Jos.Hudson
- 1691 Edward Carleton
- 1698 William Whiston
- 1702 James Smith
- 1708 John Tanner
- 1760 John Arrow
- 1789 Robert Potter
- 1804 Richard Lockwood
- 1830 Francis Cunningham
- RECTORS
- 1860 Charles Hebert
- 1870 William Hay Chapman
- 1873 George Edward Tate
- 1880 Thomas Augustus Nash
- 1889 Charles D'Aguilar Lawrence
- 1901 Albert Darrell Tupper-Carey
- 1910 Edward Lowry Henderson
- 1917 Evan C. Morgan
- 1931 Hawtrey J. Enraght
- 1938 Ralph Layard Whytehead
- 1949 Henry Herbert Redvers Barton
- 1957 William John Westwood
- 1965 Kenneth Wilkinson Riddle (who had been Curate, 1943–47)
- 1969 Douglas Caiger
- 1979 Alan Glendining
- 1985 Paul Allton
- 1994 Martin Clifford Gray
- 1999 John Simpson
- 2011 Michael Asquith
- 2023 Simon Stokes

== Organists ==
- 1790 – 1854 Robert Browne Snr.
- 1854 – 1871 Robert Browne Jnr. (Assistant organist 1871 – 1885 and organist of St. Peter's Church, Lowestoft).
- 1871 – 1885 Frederick Alexander Mann.
- 1885 – 1902 Harry Denton Flowers.
- 1902 – 1935 Ernest Banks.
- 1935 – 1969 Cyril John Mitchell.
- 1969 – 1977 John Alexander Farmer.
- 1977 – 1987 Michael Davies.
- 1988 – 1996 Robert McNeil-Watson.
- 1996 – 2010 Steven Alan Kirk.
- 2011 – 2019 David Bunkell.
- 2019 – Jonathan Stanton Williams

== Interior ==
Within the church the octagonal font dates from the 15th century. The brass lectern is a rare pre-Reformation lectern dating from around 1500. It also contains one of only two remaining banner stave lockers, a feature which is believed to be unique to this area of Suffolk.

There are a number of memorials within the church. The north wall of the church contains a memorial to fishermen who lost their lives at sea between 1896 and 1923. After this date the memorial was moved to The Lowestoft Fisherman's and Sailor's Bethel. A war memorial chapel contains a wooden wall inscribed with the names of 711 Lowestoft men who died in the First World War.

== Churchyard ==
The churchyard contains war graves of two service personnel of World War I, and seventeen of World War II.
