= Aubrey Aitken =

British Anglican bishop

- Bishop of Lynn
- Diocese: Diocese of Norwich
- In office: 1973–1985
- Predecessor: William Llewellyn
- Successor: David Bentley
- Other posts: Archdeacon of Norwich (1961–1973); Archdeacon of Lynn (1973–1980)

Orders
- Ordination: 1934 (deacon); 1935 (priest) by Harold Bilbrough
- Consecration: 1973 by Michael Ramsey

Personal details
- Born: 2 August 1911
- Died: 1 June 1985 (aged 73)
- Denomination: Anglican
- Spouse: Margaret Cunningham (m. 1937)
- Children: 3 sons; 2 daughters
- Education: Trinity College, Oxford

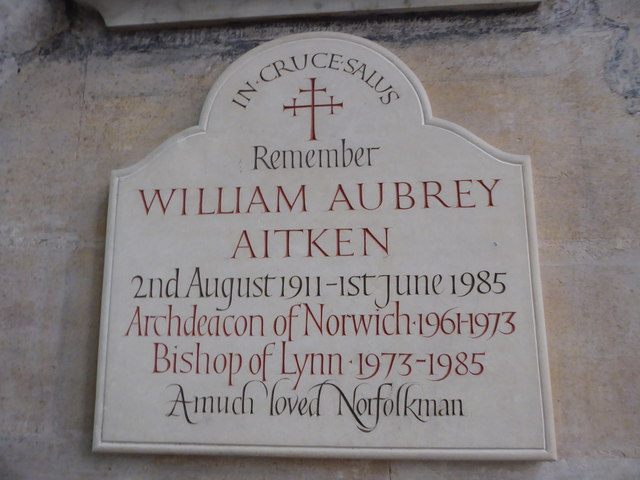
Memorial, Norwich Cathedral

William Aubrey Aitken (known as Aubrey; 2 August 1911 – 1 June 1985) was the second Bishop of Lynn from 1973 until 1985.

Born into a family of Norfolk priests (his father, Robert, was Vicar of Great Yarmouth, whose own father, Hay, was a Canon of Norwich) and educated at Norwich Grammar School and Trinity College, Oxford (he gained the degree of Oxford Master of Arts {MA Oxon}). He was ordained a deacon on 23 December 1934 and a priest on 22 December 1935, both times by Harold Bilbrough, Bishop of Newcastle, in Newcastle Cathedral. and in 1937, he married Margaret Cunningham; they had three sons and two daughters.

After curacies at Tynemouth (1934–1937) and Kingston, Jamaica (1937–1940), he was successively the Vicar at Kessingland (1940–1943), Vicar of Sprowston and Rector of Beeston, Norfolk (1943–1953) and St Margaret's King's Lynn (1953–1961) before becoming Archdeacon of Norwich in 1961, a position he held until his appointment to the episcopate. He served as a Proctor in Convocation (1944–1974); from 1958, he was an honorary canon of Norwich Cathedral; and with his suffragan See he also held the Archdeaconry of Lynn (until 1980). He was ordained and consecrated a bishop on 2 February 1973, by Michael Ramsey, Archbishop of Canterbury, at St Paul's Cathedral. A keen yachtsman, his residence at his death was the Bishop's House, Ranworth, and he died in post at the age of 73.

Church of England titles
Preceded by William Llewellyn	Bishop of Lynn; 1973–1985	Succeeded by David Bentley
