= Jonathan Meyrick =

British Anglican retired bishop (born 1952)

The Right Reverend Jonathan Meyrick
- Bishop of Lynn
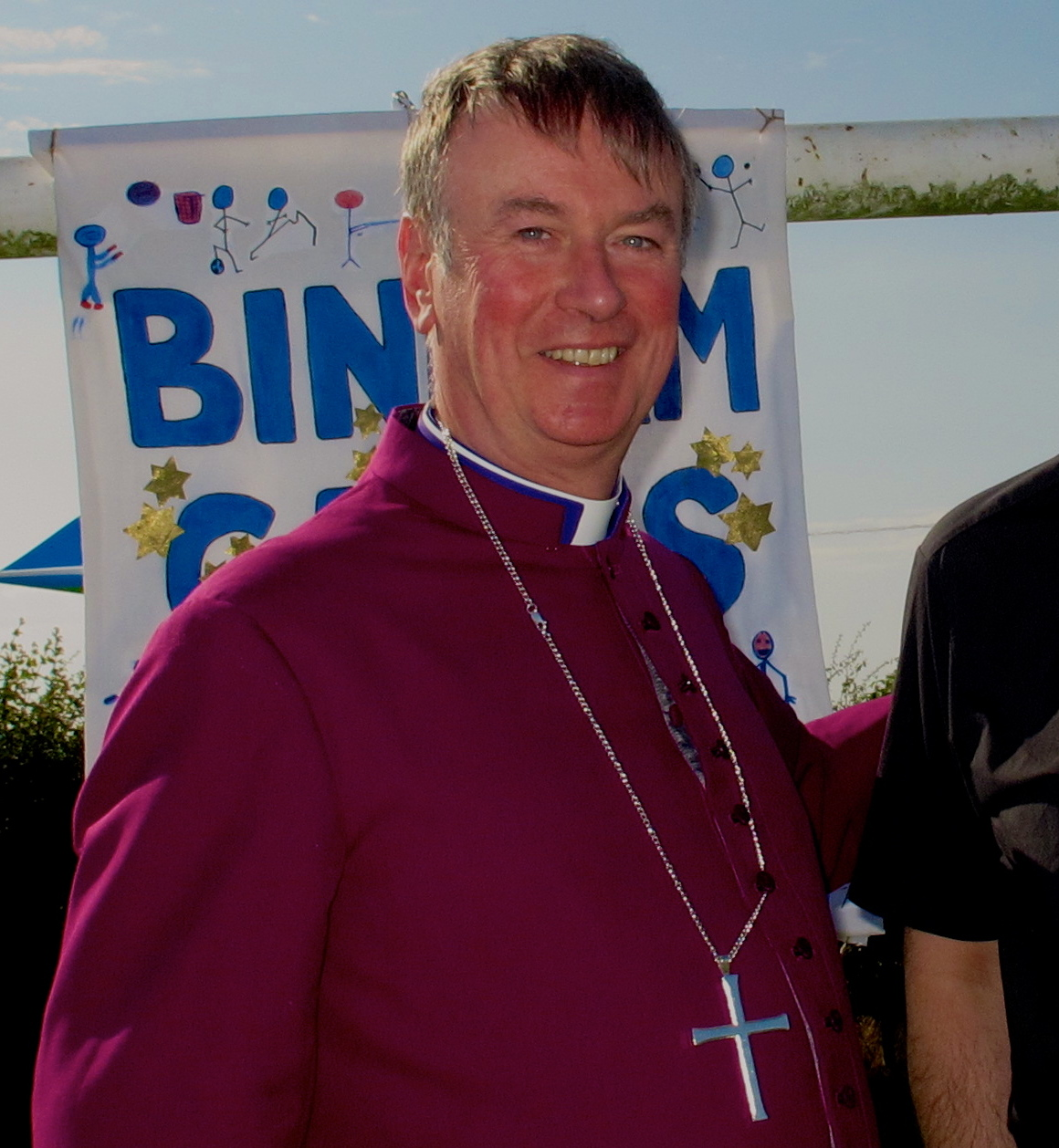
- Meyrick in 2012
- Church: Church of England
- Diocese: Diocese of Norwich
- In office: 2011–2021
- Predecessor: James Langstaff
- Other post: Dean of Exeter (2005–2011)

Orders
- Ordination: 1976
- Consecration: 2 June 2011

Personal details
- Born: 23 April 1952 (age 74)
- Denomination: Anglican
- Spouse: Rebecca
- Children: three
- Education: St John's College, Oxford

Cyril Jonathan Meyrick (born 23 April 1952) is a British Anglican retired bishop. He is a former Bishop of Lynn and Dean of Exeter.

== Early life and education ==
Meyrick was born on 23 April 1952. He was educated at Lancing College and St John's College, Oxford. He then studied for ordination at Sarum and Wells Theological College.

== Ordained ministry ==
Meyrick was made a deacon at Petertide 1976 (27 June), by Peter Walker, Bishop of Dorchester, at St Luke's, Cowley, and as a priest in 1977. After a curacy at Bicester he was domestic chaplain to Patrick Rodger, Bishop of Oxford, from 1978 to 1981 and then a tutor in Old Testament studies at Codrington College, Barbados until 1984. He returned to the Diocese of Oxford as Team Vicar of Burnham with Dropmore, Hitcham and Taplow until 1990, when he moved to become Team Rector of Tisbury, Sarum and Wells until 1998.

While at Tisbury, he served as Rural Dean of Chalke Valley from 1997 to 1998, when he moved to become a canon residentiary at Rochester Cathedral, where he served as Canon Pastor and Acting Dean. On 21 May 2005, he was installed as Dean of Exeter, serving simultaneously (ex officio) as Priest-in-charge of Central Exeter. He has presented a weekly feature in The Express and Echo under the name of "Johnny Dean".

In March 2011, it was announced that Meyrick had been appointed as Bishop of Lynn, taking over from James Langstaff, Bishop of Rochester. He was consecrated as a bishop by Rowan Williams, Archbishop of Canterbury, at Westminster Abbey on 2 June 2011 and installed in Norwich Cathedral on 29 June 2011.

In 2016, he was appointed Provost of Lancing College.

Meyrick retired as Bishop on 25 January 2021, but remains Provost of Lancing.

== Styles ==
- The Reverend Jonathan Meyrick (1976–1998)
- The Reverend Canon Jonathan Meyrick (1998–2005)
- The Very Reverend Jonathan Meyrick (2005–2011)
- The Right Reverend Jonathan Meyrick (2011–present)

Church of England titles
Preceded by Keith Jones	Dean of Exeter; 2005–2011	Succeeded by Jonathan Draper
Preceded by James Langstaff	Bishop of Lynn; 2011–2021	Succeeded by Jane Steen
