= James Langstaff (bishop) =

British Anglican bishop (born 1956)

The Right Reverend James Langstaff
- Bishop of Rochester
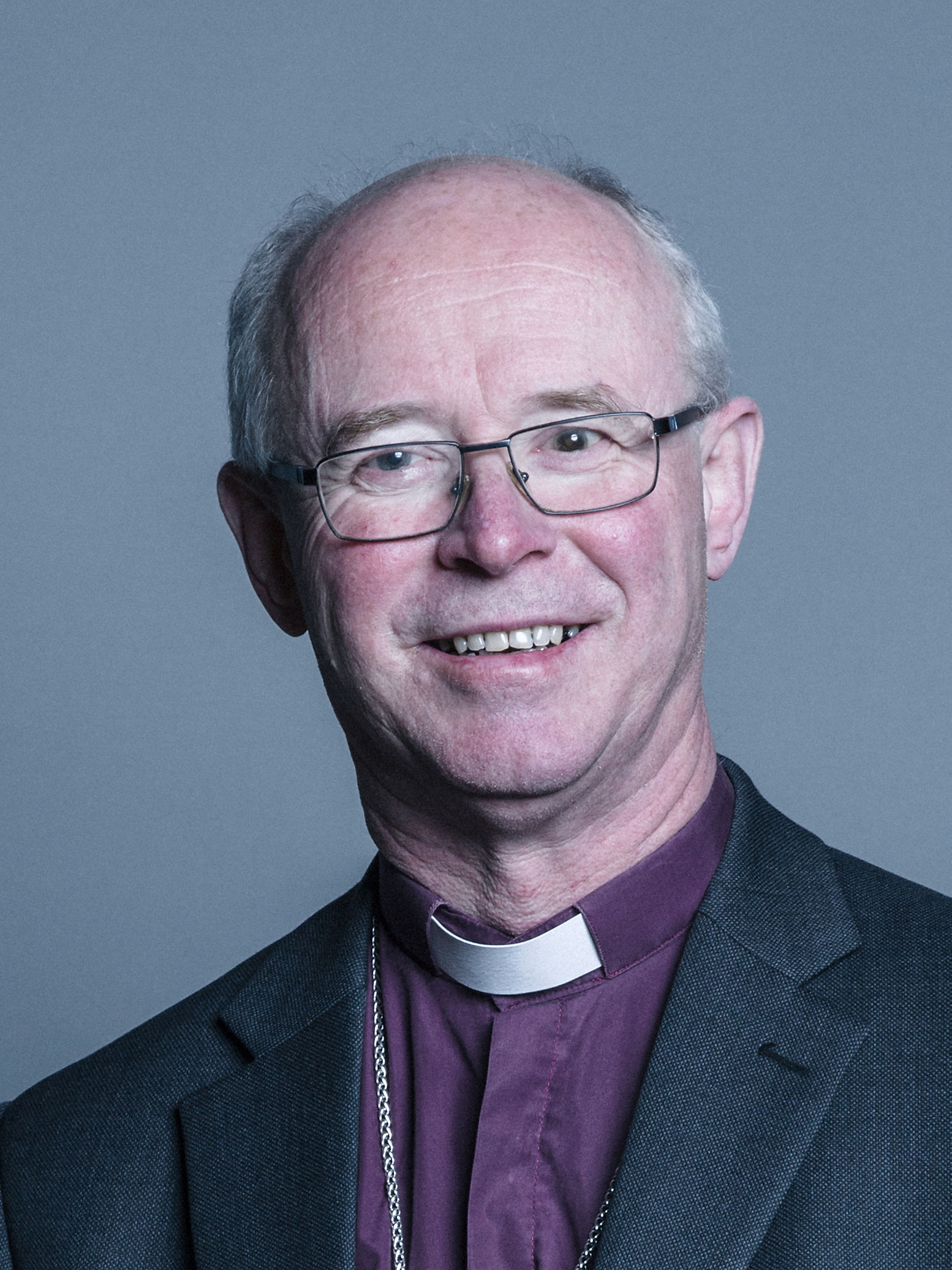
- Church: Church of England
- Diocese: Rochester
- In office: 2010–2021
- Predecessor: Michael Nazir-Ali
- Other post: Bishop of Lynn (2004–2010)

Orders
- Ordination: 28 June 1981 (deacon); 27 June 1982 (priest) by David Brown, Bishop of Guildford
- Consecration: 24 June 2004 by Rowan Williams, Archbishop of Canterbury

Personal details
- Born: 27 June 1956 (age 70)
- Denomination: Anglican
- Residence: Bishopscourt, Rochester
- Parents: Henry Langstaff & Jillian (née Brooks, now Harper)
- Spouse: Bridget (m. 1977)
- Children: two
- Education: St Catherine's College, Oxford; University of Nottingham

Member of the House of Lords
- Lord Spiritual
- Bishop of Rochester; 1 April 2014 – 31 July 2021

James Henry Langstaff (born 27 June 1956) is a British retired Anglican bishop. He served as Bishop of Rochester from 2010 until 2021; he was previously the Bishop of Lynn, a suffragan bishop in the Diocese of Norwich, from 2004 to 2010.

== Early life ==
Langstaff was born on 27 June 1956. He was educated at Cheltenham College, a public school in Cheltenham, Gloucestershire. He studied Philosophy, Politics and Economics at St Catherine's College, Oxford, and graduated from the University of Oxford with a Bachelor of Arts (BA) degree in 1977; as per tradition, his BA was promoted to a Master of Arts (MA (Oxon)) degree in 1981.

In 1978, he entered St John's College, Nottingham, an Anglican theological college in the open evangelical tradition. He studied theology at the University of Nottingham and graduated with a BA degree in 1980. He then remained for a further year at St John's College to study for ordained ministry and completed a Diploma in Pastoral Studies.

== Ordained ministry ==
Langstaff was made a deacon at Petertide 1981 (28 June) and ordained a priest the Petertide following (27 June 1982) — both times by David Brown, Bishop of Guildford, at Guildford Cathedral. He began his ordained ministry with a curacy at St Peter's Farnborough, Hampshire, after which he was Vicar of St Matthew's Church, Duddeston and Nechells and St Clement's Church, Nechells. He was then chaplain to Mark Santer, Bishop of Birmingham. He became Rector of Holy Trinity Parish Church, Sutton Coldfield and Area Dean of Sutton Coldfield.

=== Episcopal ministry ===
Langstaff was appointed Bishop of Lynn in 2004. He was consecrated a bishop at Southwark Cathedral on 24 June and installed as the suffragan Bishop of Lynn on 26 June 2004.

On 22 June 2010, Langstaff's translation to the See of Rochester was announced, where he succeeded Michael Nazir-Ali. He was installed at Rochester Cathedral on 11 December 2010. He retired effective 31 July 2021.

In April 2013 Langstaff became one of the patrons of West Kent YMCA, a charity supporting young people in parts of the Rochester diocese, drawing on his interest in social housing and development.

In 2013, Langstaff also became the Bishop to Prisons and in February 2014 became one of the bishops in the House of Lords.

In March 2020 Langstaff threatened his clergy with disciplinary action if they entered their churches to pray or livestream services.

Langstaff is also chair of the board for Housing Justice, a national Christian charity which seeks to give voice to the church on issues of housing and homelessness.

He is also Patron of the charity Prisoners Abroad, Which provides a lifeline for British citizens and their families during and after imprisonment overseas.

== Personal life ==
Langstaff is married to Bridget, with two children.

== Styles ==
- The Reverend James Langstaff (1981–2004)
- The Right Reverend James Langstaff (2004–present)

Church of England titles
Preceded by Tony Foottit	Bishop of Lynn; 2004–2010	Succeeded by Jonathan Meyrick
Preceded by Michael Nazir-Ali	Bishop of Rochester; 2010–2021	Succeeded by Jonathan Gibbs
