= David Bentley (bishop of Gloucester) =

English Anglican bishop (1935–2020)

The Rt Revd David Bentley
- Bishop of Gloucester
- Diocese: Diocese of Gloucester
- Installed: 1993
- Term ended: 2003 (retirement)
- Predecessor: Peter Ball
- Successor: Michael Perham
- Other post: Bishop of Lynn (1986–1993)

Orders
- Ordination: 1961
- Consecration: July 1986

Personal details
- Born: 7 August 1935
- Died: 4 March 2020 (aged 84)
- Denomination: Anglican
- Spouse: Clarice Bentley
- Children: Katharine Gorick, Simon Bentley, Rachel Harrison, Matthew Bentley
- Education: University of Leeds

Member of the House of Lords
- Lord Spiritual
- Bishop of Gloucester; 22 April 1998 – 31 December 2003

David Edward Bentley (7 August 1935 – 4 March 2020) was an English bishop. He was first the Bishop of Lynn and, subsequently, the Bishop of Gloucester in the Church of England.

== Early life and education ==
The son of William Bentley and his wife Florence Dalgleish, Bentley was educated at Great Yarmouth Grammar School and the University of Leeds, where he graduated BA in English literature. He studied for ordination at Westcott House, Cambridge.

== Ordained ministry ==
Bentley was ordained in 1961. He began his ordained ministry as a curate at St Ambrose's Bristol and Holy Trinity with St Mary in Guildford; after which he was rector of Headley, East Hampshire, Rural Dean of Esher and (his final position before ordination to the episcopate) Warden of the Community of All Hallows, Ditchingham.

He was consecrated as a bishop on 22 July 1986, by Robert Runcie, Archbishop of Canterbury, at Southwark Cathedral. On retirement he moved to Lichfield where he was an Honorary Assistant Bishop in the Diocese of Lichfield. His two sons in law are Suffragan Bishops.

== Private life ==
In 1962, Bentley married Clarice Lahmers, and they had two sons and two daughters.

He died on 4 March 2020 at the age of 84.

Church of England titles
Preceded by Aubrey Aitken	Bishop of Lynn; 1986–1993	Succeeded by David Conner
Preceded by Peter Ball	Bishop of Gloucester; 1993–2003	Succeeded by Michael Perham
