= Archdeacon of Lynn =

Church of England ecclesiastical office

The Archdeacon of Lynn is a senior ecclesiastical officer within the Diocese of Norwich.

As archdeacon is responsible for the disciplinary supervision of the clergy within the area deaneries. The archdeaconry of Lynn was created from those of Norwich and of Norfolk on 28 August 1894.

== List of archdeacons ==
- 1894–1903 (res.): Arthur Lloyd, Bishop suffragan of Thetford
- 1903–6 January 1926 (d.): John Bowers, Bishop suffragan of Thetford
- 1926–1946 (ret.): Harry Radcliffe (afterwards archdeacon emeritus)
- 1946–1953 (ret.): John Woodhouse, Bishop suffragan of Thetford
- 1953–28 September 1956 (d.): William Musselwhite
- 1957–1961 (ret.): Percival Smith (afterwards archdeacon emeritus)
- 1961–1972 (ret.): William Llewellyn (also first Bishop suffragan of Lynn from 1963)
- 1973–1980 (res.): Aubrey Aitken, Bishop suffragan of Lynn
- 1980–1987 (ret.): Geoffrey Grobecker (afterwards archdeacon emeritus)
- 1987–1998 (res.): Tony Foottit
- 1999–2009 (ret.): Martin Gray (afterwards archdeacon emeritus)
- 2009–2018 (ret.): John Ashe
- 9 September 2018 – 2022 (ret.): Ian Bentley (retired shortly before death, 31 May 2022)
- 1 October 2022 – present: Catherine Dobson
