= Martin Gray (priest) =

Martin Clifford Gray (born 19 January 1944) was Archdeacon of Lynn from 1999 to 2009.

Gray was educated at West Ham College of Technology and Westcott House, Cambridge. After an earlier career as a process engineer he was ordained deacon in 1980, and priest in 1981. After a curacy in Kings Lynn he held incumbencies in Sheringham and Lowestoft.

== Notes ==
Church of England titles
Preceded by Tony Foottit	Archdeacon of Lynn; 1999–2009	Succeeded by John Ashe
