= Jane Steen =

British bishop

The Right Reverend Dr Jane Steen
- Bishop of Lynn
- Diocese: Diocese of Norwich
- In office: 2021 to present
- Predecessor: Jonathan Meyrick
- Other post: Archdeacon of Southwark (2013–2021)

Orders
- Ordination: 1996 (deacon); 1997 (priest)
- Consecration: 23 June 2021 by Sarah Mullally, Bishop of London

Personal details
- Born: Jane Elizabeth Steen; 1964 (age 61–62)
- Denomination: Anglicanism
- Education: Newnham College, Cambridge; Trinity College, Cambridge; Westcott House, Cambridge; Cardiff University

Jane Elizabeth Steen (born 1964) is a British Church of England bishop. Since June 2021, she has served as the Bishop of Lynn, a suffragan bishop in the Diocese of Norwich. Previously, from 2013 to 2021, she served as Archdeacon of Southwark; and before that, from 2005 to 2013, she served as Canon Chancellor of Southwark Cathedral, and also as Director of Ministerial Education and Canon Theologian for the Diocese of Southwark.

== Early life and education ==
Steen was born in 1964 in Thornton Heath, Surrey, England. She was educated at the Old Palace School, an all-girls private school in London. From 1983 to 1987, she studied English literature at Newnham College, Cambridge. She graduated from the University of Cambridge with a Bachelor of Arts (BA) degree in 1988; as per tradition, her BA was promoted to a Master of Arts (MA Cantab) degree in 1990. She then spent a year working with elderly and disabled people in East Barnet, London.

In 1988, Steen returned to Newnham College, Cambridge to undertake postgraduate research in English. She completed her Doctor of Philosophy (PhD) degree in 1992. Her doctoral thesis was titled "Samuel Johnson and aspects of Anglicanism". She then spent a year bookselling and teaching undergraduates.

In 1993, Steen entered Westcott House, Cambridge, an Anglican theological college in the Liberal Catholic tradition. From 1993 to 1995, she also studied Theological and Religious Studies at Trinity College, Cambridge, graduating with a further BA degree in 1995. She then underwent a year of training at Westcott House in preparation for ordination and completed a Certificate in Theology for Ministry. She later studied canon law at Cardiff University, completing a Master of Laws (LLM) degree in 2016.

== Ordained ministry ==
Steen was ordained in the Church of England as a deacon in 1996 and as a priest in 1997. From 1996 to 1999, she served her curacy at St John the Baptist Church, Chipping Barnet in the Diocese of St Albans. From 1999 to 2005, she was bishop's chaplain to Tom Butler, the then Bishop of Southwark. In 2005, she was appointed Canon Chancellor of Southwark Cathedral, and Director of Ministry and Training and Canon Theologian for the Diocese of Southwark. She was also an honorary senior lecturer at Canterbury Christ Church University from 2006 to 2011.

In December 2012, it was announced that Steen would be the next Archdeacon of Southwark in the Diocese of Southwark, in succession to Michael Ipgrave. On 14 April 2013, she was installed as Archdeacon in Southwark Cathedral.

=== Episcopal ministry ===
On 28 April 2021, it was announced that Steen would be the next Bishop of Lynn, a suffragan bishop in the Diocese of Norwich. She was consecrated a bishop at Norwich Cathedral on 23 June 2021: she was the first suffragan bishop to have been consecrated at that cathedral for at least 100 years. The principal consecrator was Sarah Mullally, the Bishop of London, assisted by Graham Usher, the Bishop of Norwich, and Michael Ipgrave, the Bishop of Lichfield.

=== Views ===
In November 2023, she was one of 44 Church of England bishops who signed an open letter supporting the use of the Prayers of Love and Faith.

== Personal life ==
In 1990, she married Preston "Pip" Steen.
