= John Ashe (priest) =

English archdeacon

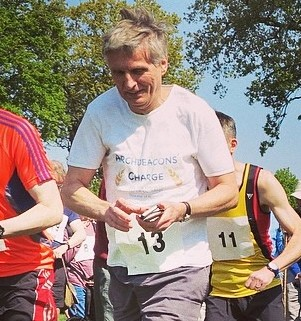
The Venerable John Ashe during a fun run in 2014

Francis John Ashe (born London, 11 February 1953) was Archdeacon of Lynn from 2009 until 2018.

Ashe was educated at Christ's Hospital; the University of Sheffield and Ridley Hall, Cambridge. After an earlier career as a metallurgist he was ordained deacon in 1979, and priest in 1980. After a curacy in Ashtead he was Priest in charge at St Faith, Plumstead, Cape Town. He was Rector of Wisley with Pyrford from 1987 to 1993; and of Godalming from 1993 to 2009 (also Rural Dean 1996 to 2002).

Church of England titles
| Preceded by Martin Gray | Archdeacon of Lynn; 2009–2018 | Succeeded by Ian Bentley |
