= Michael Perham (bishop) =

British Anglican bishop

The Right Reverend Michael Perham
- Bishop of Gloucester
- Church: Church of England
- Diocese: Diocese of Gloucester
- Installed: 29 May 2004
- Term ended: 21 November 2014
- Predecessor: David Bentley
- Successor: Rachel Treweek
- Other post: Dean of Derby (17 March 2000–2004)

Orders
- Ordination: 1976
- Consecration: 2004

Personal details
- Born: 8 November 1947 Dorchester, Dorset
- Died: 17 April 2017 (aged 69)
- Denomination: Anglican
- Spouse: Alison
- Children: Rachel, Anna, Sarah and Mary
- Education: Keble College, Oxford

Member of the House of Lords
- Lord Spiritual
- Bishop of Ely; 1 December 2009 – 21 November 2014

Michael Francis Perham (8 November 1947 – 17 April 2017) was a British Anglican bishop. From 2004 to 2014, he served as the Bishop of Gloucester in the Church of England.

== Early life and education ==
Perham was born on 8 November 1947 in Dorset, England. He attended Hardye's School, Dorchester before going to Keble College, Oxford in 1971 to study theology. While there, he served as JCR President. He also studied theology at Cuddesdon College (now Ripon College Cuddesdon) where he later served as chair of the board of governors.

== Ordained ministry ==
Perham was a curate of St Mary's Church, Addington (Diocese of Canterbury) from 1976 to 1981, before becoming chaplain to the Bishop of Winchester, John Taylor, from 1981 to 1984. He was also Secretary to the Church of England Doctrine Commission from 1979 to 1984.

Perham became the team rector of the Oakdale Team Ministry in Poole in 1984, a position he relinquished in 1992 to become the precentor and a residential canon at Norwich Cathedral. He was instituted as Provost of Derby on 21 March 1998 (retitled as the Dean of Derby on 17 March 2000 with the general deprecation of provosts by the Church of England).

Perham was a member of the Church of England Liturgical Commission from 1986 to 2001 and had a significant role in the production of the Common Worship service book.

=== Episcopal ministry ===
Perham was announced by 10 Downing Street as the next Bishop of Gloucester on 20 January 2004.

Alongside these ministries, he has filled many roles in the Church of England nationally. He was for a time secretary of its doctrine commission. He served on the Archbishops’ Commission on Church Music that produced a key report, "In Tune with Heaven", in 1992. He has been a member of the General Synod since 1989 and was a member of the Archbishops’ Council and Chair of the General Synod Business Committee until he became a bishop. He also served as Chair of the Hospital Chaplaincies’ Council. He was Chair of the Society for Promoting Christian Knowledge (SPCK) from 2007 to 2011. He was a member of the Crown Nominations Commission which chose the new Archbishop of Canterbury in 2012. He was a leading bishop in the campaign for women to be permitted to be bishops and had the satisfaction of seeing the first woman diocesan bishop appointed to succeed him in Gloucester.

Perham is known for his work on church worship. He served on the Church of England Liturgical Commission from 1982 to 2001, being one of the principal architects of its Common Worship services. He has lectured and written about worship consistently throughout his ministry.

Perham was a member of the House of Lords and of the House of Bishops’ Standing Committee. He served on the working party reviewing the Church of England's teaching on human sexuality. He has been a strong advocate of the role of women in the church as priests and bishops. He was Bishop Protector of the European Province of the Society of St Francis between 2005 and 2014, Chair of the Governing Body of Ripon College, Cuddesdon and of the Retired Clergy Association. He was President of Affirming Catholicism from 2001 to 2014.

Within the Diocese of Gloucester, Perham was the president or patron of a number of local organisations, including GARAS, GEAR, Cheltenham YMCA, the Star College and Emmaus Gloucester. He hosted the quarterly "Bishop's Breakfast", which brought together many of the civic and community leaders in the county. He was Pro-Chancellor and Vice-Chair of the Council of the University of Gloucestershire until December 2015.

=== Allegations and retirement ===
In February 2014, Perham announced that he would be retiring as Bishop of Gloucester on 21 November 2014, after 10 years in the position, but in August 2014 he 'stepped back from his ministry' while allegations of sexual abuse in the 1980s were investigated.

Perham received widespread support and affirmation throughout this time, from people inside and outside the church and in October 2014 the Metropolitan Police concluded that there were no grounds for action. In May 2015, the Church of England safeguarding committee announced that Perham had been approved to continue ministry in retirement.

A farewell service of thanksgiving and celebration to mark Perham's time as Bishop of Gloucester took place at Gloucester Cathedral on 13 June 2015 after having been postponed because of the allegations. Over 1000 people attended. He discussed his long ministry, and the effects of the false allegations, in an interview with the BBC's Richard Atkins in June 2015.

In the General Synod that July the Archbishop of Canterbury delivered a tribute to Perham's ministry; it received a prolonged standing ovation. The Church Times reported, on 17 July 2015, that the archbishop was "glad to thank Bishop Perham wholeheartedly for his ministry after all the investigations and inquiries had cleared him."

== Later life ==
Perham continued as president of the Alcuin Club and as vice-president of Women and the Church. He was a visiting scholar at Sarum College and an honorary fellow of Ripon College Cuddesdon. In January 2016 he became chair of the Board of Governors of the University of St Mark & St John (Marjon) in Plymouth. In March 2016 he was appointed to the Fabric Advisory Committee of York Minster (responsible for the care, conservation, repair and development of this 800-year-old Gothic cathedral). Also in 2016, he was appointed an honorary assistant bishop in four dioceses: Bath & Wells, Carlisle, Portsmouth and Salisbury.

Perham died on 17 April 2017, aged 69. His death was announced by his successor as Bishop of Gloucester, Rachel Treweek. His Funeral Eucharist was held at Gloucester Cathedral on 6 May 2017; over 1000 people attended the service.

== Personal life ==
Perham was married to Alison Grove, a palliative care consultant. The couple had four adult daughters: Rachel, Anna, Sarah and Mary. He listed one of his hobbies as writing liturgical texts.

== Honours ==
He was made a Freeman of the City of Gloucester on 27 March 2014 at a Special Meeting of the City Council.

Perham was made an Honorary Fellow of the Royal School of Church Music in 2002 and an Honorary Doctor of Philosophy of the University of Gloucestershire in 2007. In 2016, he was awarded the Cranmer Award for Worship by the Archbishop of Canterbury for his work on Common Worship.

== Selected publications ==
- Communion of Saints (1982) ISBN 9780281037940
- (with Kenneth Stevenson) Waiting for the Risen Christ: A Commentary on "Lent, Holy Week, Easter: Services and Prayers" (SPCK, 1986) ISBN 9780281042067
- Lift High the Cross: A Meditation in Words and Music on the Passion (1989)
- The Renewal of Common Prayer
- Liturgy Pastoral and Parochial (1991)
- (with Kenneth Stevenson) Welcoming the Light of Christ: A Commentary on "The Promise of His Glory: Services and Prayers for the Season from All Saints to Candlemas" (SPCK, 1991) ISBN 9780281044986
- Lively Sacrifice: The Eucharist in the Church of England Today (SPCK, 1992) ISBN 9780281046188
- Enriching the Christian Year: Services and Prayers, for Use in Conjunction with the ASB (SPCK, 1993) ISBN 9780814622421
- Celebrate the Christian Story: An Introduction to the New Lectionary and Calendar (1997) ISBN 9780281051076
- The Sorrowful Way: The Mind of Christ, the Path of Discipleship and the Christian Year (SPCK, 1998) ISBN 9780281051311
- At All Times and in All Places: A Syllabus for Liturgical Formation in the Church of England (1999)
- New Handbook of Pastoral Liturgy (SPCK, 2000) ISBN 9780281052523
- Signs of Your Kingdom (SPCK, 2002) ISBN 9780281055111
- Glory in Our Midst (SPCK, 2005) ISBN 9780281055821
- To Tell Afresh (SPCK, 2010) ISBN 9780281062317
- The Hospitality of God: Emerging Worship for a Missional Church with Bishop Mary Gray-Reeves (New York: Church Publishing, 2011) ISBN 9781596271388
- Jesus and Peter: Growing in Friendship with God (SPCK, 2012) ISBN 9780281067541
- Echoing the Word: The Bible In The Eucharist with Paula Gooder (2013) ISBN 9780274690824
- The Way of Christ-Likeness: Being Transformed by the Liturgies of Lent, Holy Week and Easter (Canterbury Press Norwich, 2016) ISBN 9781848259010
- One Unfolding Story: Biblical Reflections through the Christian Year (Canterbury Press Norwich, 2018) ISBN 9781786220493

== Styles ==
- Michael Perham Esq (1947–1976)
- The Revd Michael Perham (1976–1992)
- The Revd Canon Michael Perham (1992–1998)
- The Very Revd Michael Perham (1998–2004)
- The Rt Revd Michael Perham (2004–2017)

Church of England titles
Preceded by David Bentley	Bishop of Gloucester; 2004–2014	Succeeded by Rachel Treweek
