= Ian Bentley =

English Anglican priest (1955–2022)

Ian Robert Bentley (28 April 1955 – 31 May 2022) was an English Anglican priest. He was Archdeacon of Lynn from 2018 to 2022.

Bentley was born on 28 April 1955. He was educated at Westcliff High School for Boys; the University of Sheffield; and Cranmer Hall, Durham. After an earlier career as a teacher he was ordained deacon in 1995, and priest in 1996. After a curacy in Mattishall he was Vicar of the Earsham group of parishes for 7 years and vicar of St.Mark’s Oulton Broad for a further 12. He was briefly Priest in charge at St Faith, Plumstead, Cape Town during a sabbatical. He held incumbencies at Earsham, Oulton Broad and St Peter Mancroft.

Bentley died on 31 May 2022, shortly after being diagnosed with stage 4 liver cancer and having resigned his archdeaconry about a month earlier.

Church of England titles
Preceded by Francis John Ashe	Archdeacon of Lynn; 2018–2022	TBA
