= Tony Foottit =

Bishop of Lynn

The Rt Revd Tony Foottit MA(Cantab)
- Bishop of Lynn
- Diocese: Diocese of Norwich
- In office: 1999–2003
- Predecessor: David Conner
- Successor: James Langstaff
- Other posts: Honorary assistant bishop in Norwich (?–present); Archdeacon of Lynn (1987–1999)

Orders
- Ordination: 1961 (deacon); 1962 (priest)
- Consecration: 1999

Personal details
- Born: 28 June 1935 (age 91)
- Denomination: Anglican
- Parents: Percival and Mildred
- Spouse: Rosamond Buxton
- Children: One son, two daughters
- Profession: Writer
- Education: King's College, Cambridge

Anthony Charles "Tony" Foottit (born 28 June 1935) was the Bishop of Lynn from 1999 to 2003.

Foottit was educated at Lancing College and King's College, Cambridge. Ordained in 1961, he was a curate at Wymondham, after which he was vicar of Blakeney, Rural Dean of Cary and finally, before his ordination to the episcopate, the Archdeacon of Lynn (1987–1999).

A keen botanist, he is married with three children.

Church of England titles
Preceded by David Conner	Bishop of Lynn; 1999–2003	Succeeded by James Langstaff
