= Ingworth =

Village in Norfolk, England

Coordinates: 52.81934°N 1.25309°E

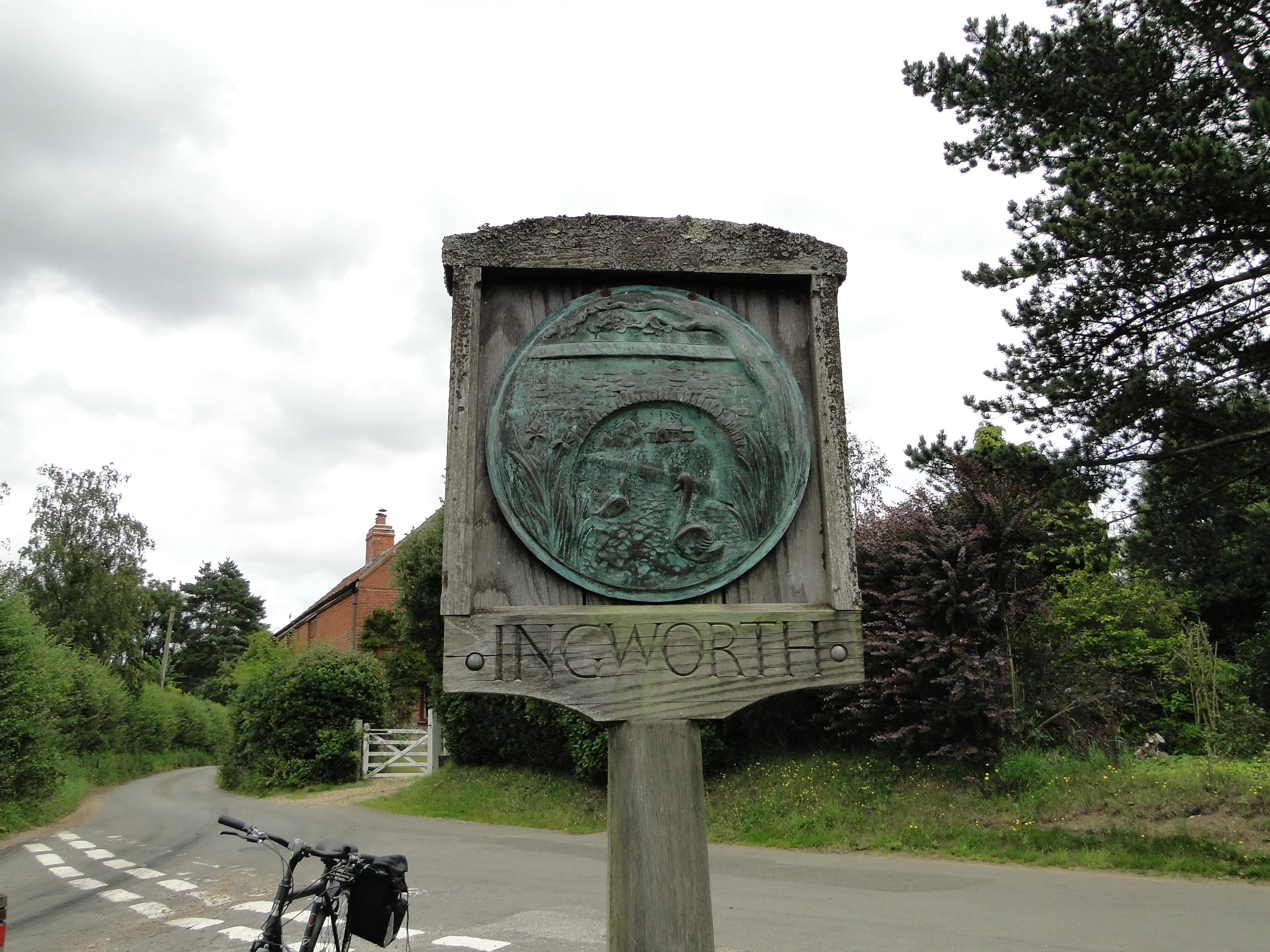
- Ingworth Village Sign

- Location within Norfolk
- Area: 0.82 sq mi (2.1 km^{2})
- OS grid reference: TG192296
  - London: 129 miles (208 km)
- Civil parish: Ingworth
- District: North Norfolk
- Shire county: Norfolk
- Region: East
- Country: England
- Sovereign state: United Kingdom
- Post town: NORWICH
- Postcode district: NR11
- Dialling code: 01263
- UK Parliament: North Norfolk

Ingworth is a village and a civil parish in the English county of Norfolk.

Ingworth is located 1.7 miles (2.7 km) north of Aylsham and 14.3 miles (23.0 km) north of Norwich.

== History ==
Ingworth's name is of Anglo-Saxon origin and derives from the Old English for Inga's enclosure.

In the Domesday Book, Ingworth is listed as a settlement of 16 households in the hundred of South Erpingham. In 1086, the village was divided between the East Anglian estates of Roger Bigod and Reginald, son of Ivo.

A watermill was listed in Ingworth on the River Bure as far back as the Domesday Book. The most modern mill building was built in Seventeenth Century and demolished in 1912.

== Geography ==
Due to its small size, separate population statistics are not collected for Ingworth.

The northern border of the parish is marked by the River Bure whilst the northern boundary is the Weavers' Way.

== St. Lawrence's Church ==
Ingworth's parish church is dedicated to Saint Lawrence and dates from the Thirteenth Century. St. Lawrence's is located on Banningham Road and has been Grade II listed since 1960. The church no longer holds Sunday service.

St. Lawrence was one of Norfolk's round-tower churches before the tower collapsed in the early Nineteenth Century.

The church also holds Ingworth's war memorial, a metal plaque which commemorates Pte. Eustace C. Kaufman who was killed on 8 April 1917 serving with the 46th (South Saskatchewan) Bn., Canadian Expeditionary Force and is commemorated on the Vimy Memorial. Kaufman was the son of the Rector of Ingworth and had emigrated to Canada as a farmer before the war.

== Governance ==
Ingworth is part of the electoral ward of Erpingham for local elections and is part of the district of North Norfolk.

The village's national constituency is North Norfolk, which has been represented by the Liberal Democrat Steff Aquarone MP since 2024.
