= Bishop of Lynn =

Episcopal title

The Bishop of Lynn is an episcopal title used by a suffragan bishop of the Church of England Diocese of Norwich, in the Province of Canterbury, England. The title takes its name after the town of King's Lynn in Norfolk; the See was erected under the Suffragans Nomination Act 1888 by Order in Council dated 26 June 1963. The Bishop of Lynn has particular oversight of the Archdeaconry of Lynn.

The present bishop is Jane Steen, who was consecrated at Norwich Cathedral on 23 June 2021.

== List of Bishops of Lynn ==
Bishops of Lynn
From	Until	Incumbent	Notes
1963	1972	William Llewellyn	Also Archdeacon of Lynn
1972	1986	Aubrey Aitken	
1986	1993	David Bentley	Translated to Gloucester
1994	1999	David Conner	Translated to Dean of Windsor
1999	2003	Tony Foottit	
2004	2010	James Langstaff	Translated to Rochester
2011	2021	Jonathan Meyrick	Previously Dean of Exeter; retired 25 January 2021.
2021	present	Jane Steen	Previously Archdeacon of Southwark
