= John Bowers (bishop) =

Bowers in 1916

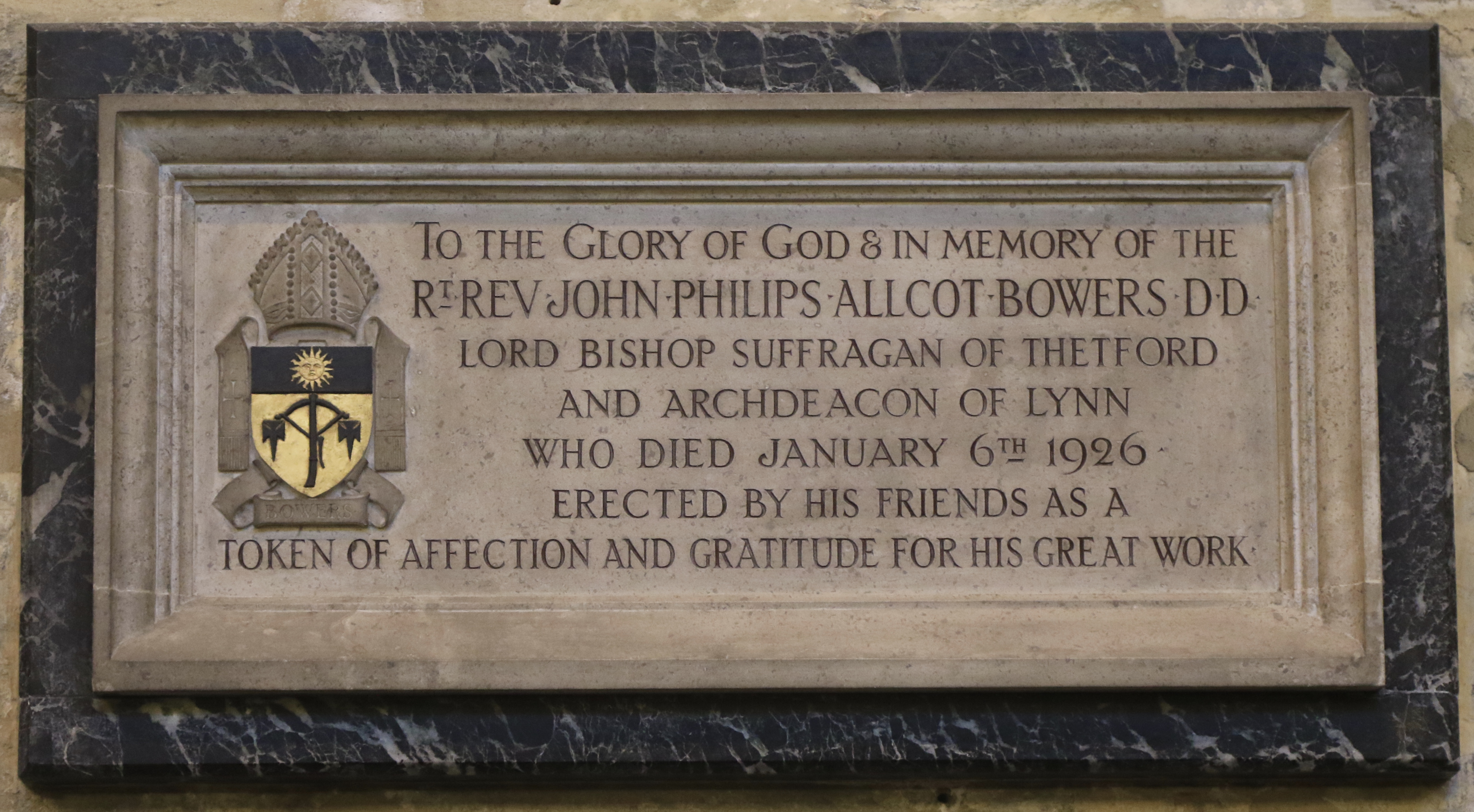
Memorial in King's Lynn Minster

John Phillips Allcot Bowers (15 May 1854 – 6 January 1926) was Bishop of Thetford in the Church of England in 1903–1926.

John Bowers was born in Portsea, Portsmouth, Hampshire, and educated at Magdalen School and St John's College, Cambridge. His first post after ordination was as a Curate at Coggeshall. From 1882 to 1903 he was Domestic Chaplain to the Bishop of Gloucester and went on to be Diocesan Missioner and a Residentiary Canon at Gloucester Cathedral (1890–1902). In January 1902, he was appointed Archdeacon of Gloucester before his appointment as Bishop of Thetford and Archdeacon of Lynn in 1903 which refers to Kings Lynn.

A prominent Freemason, he died in Norwich.

Church of England titles
Preceded by Arthur Lloyd	Bishop of Thetford; 1903–1926	Vacant Title next held by John Woodhouse
