= Harold Bilbrough =

British Anglican bishop (1867–1950)

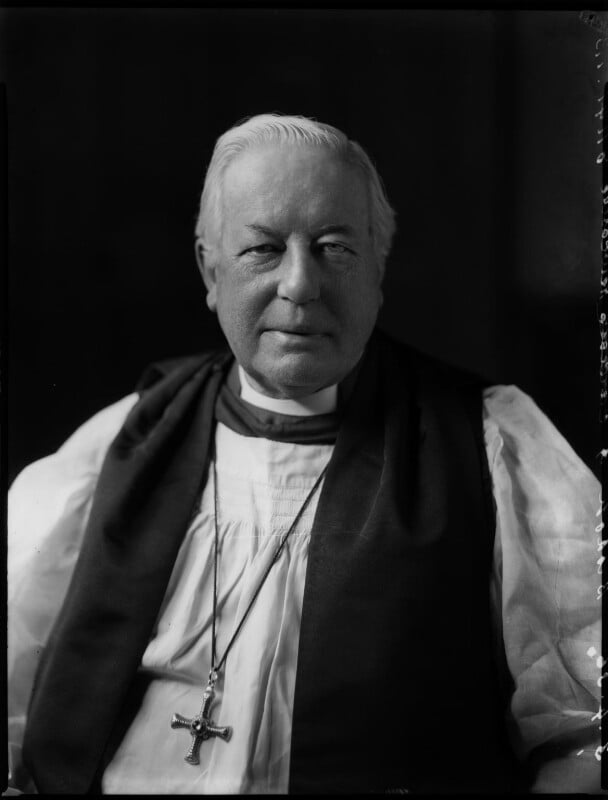
Bilbrough in 1936

Harold Ernest Bilbrough (1867 – 15 November 1950) was the fourth Anglican Bishop of Dover in the modern era.

== Life and career ==
Bilbrough was educated at Winchester and New College, Oxford, he began his ecclesiastical career with a curacy at St Mary's, South Shields and was successively Vicar of St John's, Darlington, Rural Dean of Jarrow and then Sub-Dean of Liverpool Cathedral before his elevation to the episcopate as Bishop of Dover in 1916. He was nominated Bishop of Newcastle on 14 September and installed on 5 October 1927; he retired on 1 October 1941.
