= David Conner (bishop) =

British bishop in the Church of England

The Right Reverend David Conner GCVO
- Dean of Windsor
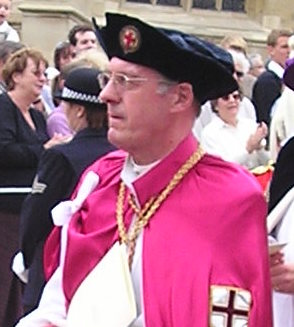
- Conner as Register of the Order of the Garter, 2006
- Church: St George's Chapel at Windsor Castle
- In office: 1998–2023
- Predecessor: Patrick Mitchell
- Other posts: Bishop to the Forces (2001–2009); Bishop of Lynn (1994–1998)

Orders
- Consecration: 2 February 1994

Personal details
- Born: 6 April 1947 (age 79) Erith, Kent, England
- Denomination: Church of England
- Education: Erith Grammar School; Exeter College, Oxford

David John Conner, GCVO (born 6 April 1947) is a British Anglican bishop. He served as Dean of Windsor from 1998 to 2023, and was additionally the Bishop to the Forces between 2001 and 2009. He previously served as Bishop of Lynn, a suffragan bishop of the Diocese of Norwich, from 1994 to 1998, and in school chaplaincy. Conner retired effective 31 July 2023.

== Biography ==
Conner is the son of William Ernest Conner and Joan Millington Conner. He was educated at Erith Grammar School, then Exeter College, Oxford and St Stephen's House, Oxford. He was ordained as deacon on 29 June 1971 by Christopher Pepys, Bishop of Buckingham at St Martin's, Fenny Stratford. Having also spent a year at the Oxford Department of Education, soon after ordination he moved into chaplaincy at St Edward's School, Oxford (where he was ordained priest in 1972 by Kenneth Woollcombe, Bishop of Oxford, in the School Chapel) from 1971 to 1980, and later at Winchester. For a while, he was an examining chaplain to the Bishop of Winchester. From 1987 to 1994 he was Vicar of Great St Mary's the University Church, Cambridge. He served as Bishop of Lynn from 1994 to 1998, in which year he was appointed Dean of Windsor; in this role, Conner also held the post of Register of the Order of the Garter and was a domestic chaplain to Elizabeth II. From 2001 to 2009 he was also Bishop to the Forces. He was consecrated as bishop on 2 February 1994 at St Paul's Cathedral, by George Carey, Archbishop of Canterbury. His installation at Windsor on 7 December 1998 was attended by Elizabeth II and Prince Philip, Duke of Edinburgh; he later presided over both of their interments in the King George VI Memorial Chapel on 19 September 2022, after the Queen's committal ceremony.

For many years Conner has been closely involved with the selection of candidates for ordination and with the inspection of theological colleges, courses and schemes. He has been governor of a number of schools and colleges. He is an honorary fellow of Girton College, Cambridge.

== Honours ==
Conner was appointed Knight Commander of the Royal Victorian Order (KCVO) in the 2010 New Year Honours. He was promoted to Knight Grand Cross (GCVO) on 19 July 2023 ahead of relinquishing the post of Dean of Windsor.

He took part in the Royal Procession at the 2023 Coronation, not long before his 31 July 2023 retirement.

== Personal life ==
In 1969, Conner married Jayne Maria Evans; they have two sons.
