= St Lawrence Parish Church, Hunworth =

Church in Hunworth, Norfolk, England

Coordinates: 52.87782°N 1.06776°E

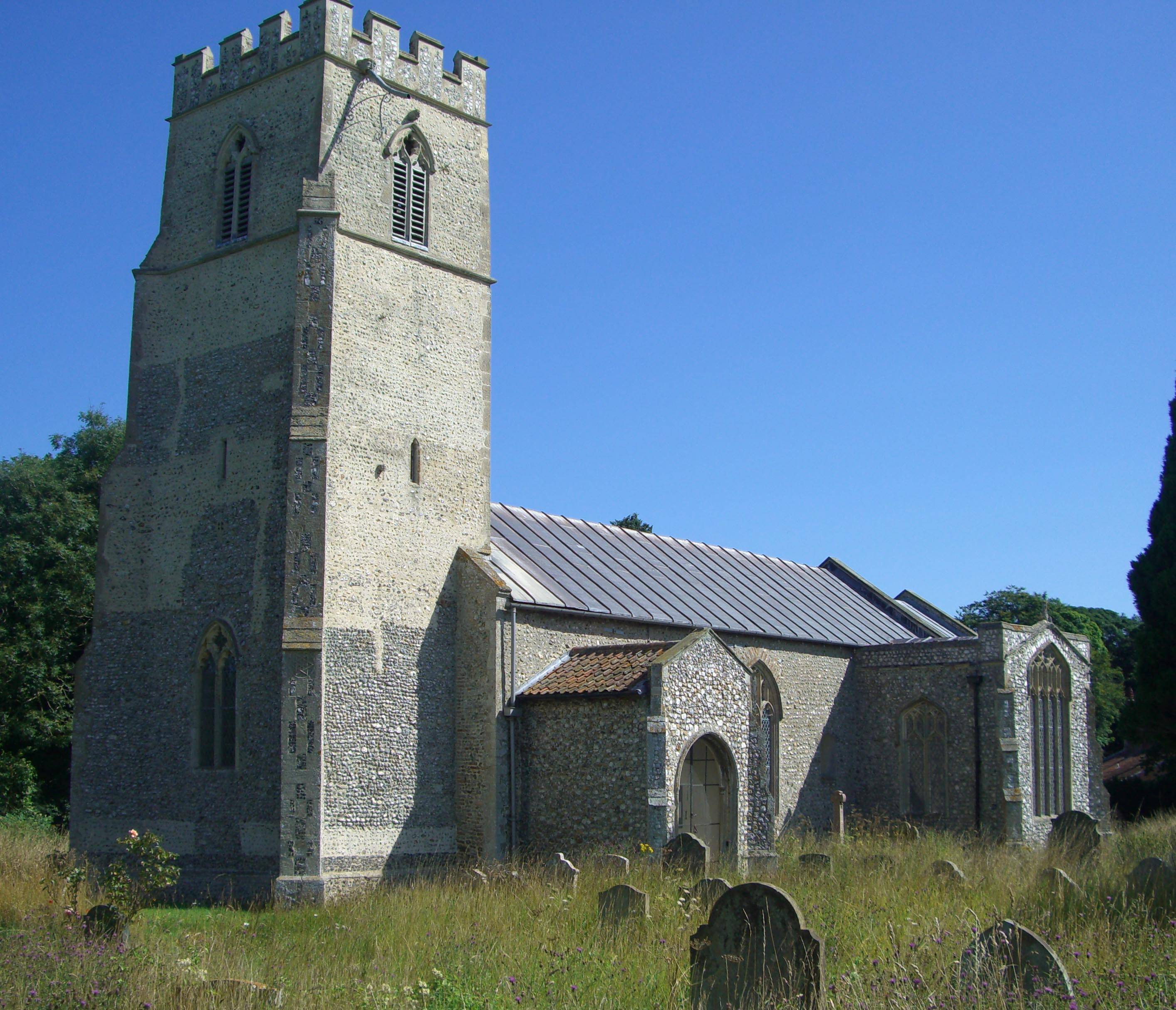

St Lawrence Parish Church is a Grade II listed building in the village of Hunworth in Norfolk, England. The church is dedicated to Saint Lawrence who was martyred in 258 AD.

== History ==
The exact date of the construction of the church is not known but the style of the aisle-less nave which is the oldest part of the current building, is early Norman and dates it to the 11th century. The church is constructed in flint work and the external south wall which also dates from the Norman period is typical of early work with this material with whole flints laid in wide courses. The south wall had a double splayed window which is also typical of the early Norman period, it was not rediscovered until a 1960s refurbishment. Further expansion of the church continued with the external north wall being constructed in the early 12th century with more loose coursed flints. The Perpendicular windows in the south wall were added in the 1350s and indicate the modifications in design and construction after the impact of the Black Death. A three-stage tower was added around 1370 at the west end of the church, this probably replaced an earlier tower.

The church underwent a substantial reconstruction in the middle part of the 15th century. The three stage tower was raised to its current height with the addition of a belfry with decorative battlements, it was also strengthened by two diagonal buttresses and modifications to the tower arch. The belfry originally had three bells but two of these were sold in 1746, the remaining bell was cast by the bell founders William Brend of Norwich. The south transept was also added at this time and its fine construction and design indicates it was probably a gift from a wealthy patron of the church, it was used as the Lady chapel with a piscina for washing the church vessels. The internal roof of the south transept is the only medieval woodwork left in the church. The south porch was also added during the 15th century restoration, this disproportionately tall building was typical of the middle 15th century, the lower diagonal buttresses have a flint design of an L with a crown and a griddle on top and refers to the martyrdom of St Lawrence.

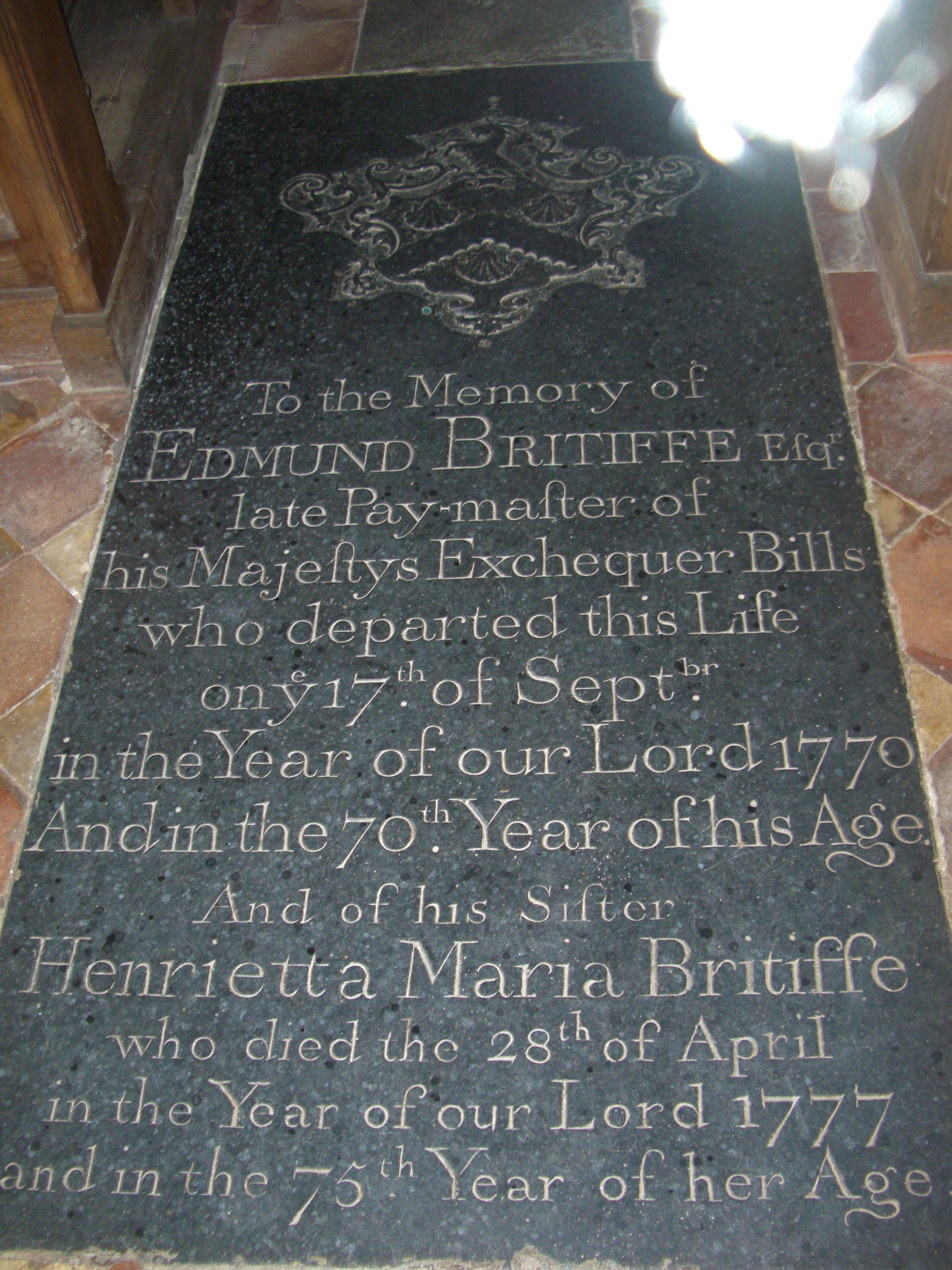
Memorial to Edmund and Henrietta Britliffe

In 1779 the original chancel was devastated in the great New Year gale of that year, many of the original medieval features were lost, including stained glass windows, wall paintings and rood screen. The chancel was not rebuilt until 1850 when the Reverend James Bulwer directed the restoration and includes the triple lancet east window. Bulwer was St Lawrence's most famous incumbent and became Rector in 1848, he was a well known antiquarian and artist. He amassed a huge collection of historical papers, many of which are now at Norwich Castle Museum. He was also a gifted artist who was a friend of John Sell Cotman and a patron of Frederick Sandys. Several of Bulwer's watercolours of St Lawrence's church are stored in Norwich Castle Museum. His modest grave is on the north side of the churchyard. Poppyhead benches were added to the church during the chancel rebuilding of 1850. In 1935 Harold Harmsworth, 1st Viscount Rothermere spent several hundred pounds on interior fittings and furnishings, including copies of the Book of Common Prayer, the brass altar vase and the eagle lectern.

=== Interior ===
The medieval font stands underneath the west tower, there is a small statue of the church's patron Saint Lawrence in an alcove on the north side while the floor has ceramic tiling. There are two memorial slabs to the Britiffe family who were local gentry that rose up the social ladder from modest beginnings, they had strong connections with Hunworth for two centuries. Edmund and his wife Rebecca, who built nearby Hunworth Hall and its adjacent barns, lie beneath a memorial slab in the church nave. Edmund's son, also Edmund, who was a civil servant, and his daughter Henrietta are buried under an ornate marble slab nearest the altar.
