= William Llewellyn (bishop) =

William Somers Llewellyn (16 August 1907 – 22 July 2001) was the inaugural bishop of Lynn from 1963 until 1972.

Educated at Eton and Balliol, he was deaconed on Trinity Sunday 1935 (16 June) and priest the next Trinity Sunday (7 June 1937) – both times by Arthur Winnington-Ingram, Bishop of London at St Paul's Cathedral – and began his ecclesiastical career with a curacy at Chiswick. From 1940 until 1946 he was a chaplain to the Forces and then vicar of Tetbury, from when on he was to have a deep affinity with the area. Additionally rural dean of the area from 1955, in 1961 he was appointed Archdeacon of Lynn and suffragan bishop a year later: he was consecrated a bishop by Michael Ramsey, Archbishop of Canterbury, on 18 October 1963 at Westminster Abbey. On retirement he continued to serve the church as an assistant bishop within the Diocese of Gloucester.

Church of England titles
| New title | Bishop of Lynn; 1963–1972 | Succeeded by Aubrey Aitken |
