= John Woodhouse (bishop) =

Anglican bishop (1884–1955)

John Walker Woodhouse (28 January 1884 – 13 March 1955) was an Anglican suffragan bishop from 1945 until 1953.

He was born on 28 January 1884 and educated at Charterhouse and University College, Oxford before embarking on an ecclesiastical career with a curacy at St James, Milton, Portsmouth. He was made deacon in Advent 1910 (18 December), by John Randolph, Bishop suffragan of Guildford, at Farnham Parish Church and ordained priest on St Thomas' Day 1911 (21 December), by Edward Talbot, Bishop of Winchester, at Holy Trinity Church, Guildford. He was a Temporary Chaplain to the Forces from 1915 to 1919. He served at King George Hospital in London, for a short period with the Guards Division in 1915, then back to London before an 8-month attachment to V Army in France and 6 months with the RAF. After service as a World War I chaplain he was then Vicar of St John's, Waterloo Road, Lambeth and after that St George's, Newcastle upon Tyne. From 1942 to 1945 he was Rural Dean of Huddersfield and finally Bishop of Thetford (and also Archdeacon of Lynn from 1946) from 1945 to 1953. He was consecrated a bishop on St James's Day 1945 (25 July), by Geoffrey Fisher, Archbishop of Canterbury, at Westminster Abbey. He died on 13 March 1955 after a short retirement.

Church of England titles
| Vacant Title last held by John Bowers | Bishop of Thetford; 1945–1953 | Succeeded by Martin Leonard |
