= Diocese of Norwich =

Diocese of the Church of England

Coordinates: 52.6318°N 1.3010°E

Diocese of Norwich Dioecesis Norvicensis
- Coat of arms

- Flag

Location
- Ecclesiastical province: Canterbury
- Archdeaconries: Lynn, Norfolk, Norwich

Statistics
- Parishes: 563
- Churches: 656

Information
- Cathedral: Norwich Cathedral
- Language: English

Current leadership
- Bishop: Graham Usher, Bishop of Norwich
- Suffragans: Jane Steen, Bishop of Lynn; Ian Bishop, Bishop of Thetford
- Archdeacons: Steven Betts, Archdeacon of Norfolk; Keith James, Archdeacon of Norwich; Catherine Dobson, Archdeacon of Lynn

Website
- www.dioceseofnorwich.org

The Diocese of Norwich is an ecclesiastical jurisdiction of the Church of England, forming part of the Province of Canterbury in England. Its origins trace back to the early medieval bishopric of Elmham and Thetford, which were subsequently merged and relocated to Norwich in 1095 under Bishop Herbert de Losinga. Historically, the diocese has overseen numerous parishes across Norfolk and Suffolk, and it played a significant role in the religious and political developments of medieval England. Today, it continues to function as an important administrative and spiritual centre within the Anglican Church.

== History ==
The Diocese of Norwich traces its origins to the early medieval Bishopric of East Anglia, founded in 630 at Dommoc (likely Dunwich or nearby). Like many Anglo-Saxon bishoprics, it relocated over time, moving to Elmham in 673. Following the Norman Conquest, it was transferred to Thetford in 1070 before finally settling in Norwich in 1095 under Bishop Herbert de Losinga.

It currently oversees 563 parishes and 656 churches, covering nearly all of Norfolk except for the extreme west beyond the River Great Ouse, which falls under the Diocese of Ely. The diocese also includes the deanery of Lothingland, encompassing the port of Lowestoft and its surrounding areas in Suffolk. This totals an area of over 1,800 square miles (4,700 km^{2}) with a population of approximately 867,000 (as of 2008).

Like most older dioceses, its territory has gradually reduced over time. Until the formation of the Diocese of St Edmundsbury and Ipswich in 1914, Suffolk was included, along with other areas in earlier periods.

== Organisation ==
=== Bishops ===
The Bishop of Norwich (Graham Usher) leads the diocese and is assisted by two suffragan bishops, the Bishop of Thetford (Ian Bishop) and the Bishop of Lynn (Jane Steen). The suffragan sees of Ipswich and of Thetford were both created by the Suffragan Bishops Act 1534 but went into abeyance after one incumbent; Thetford was next filled in 1894 and Ipswich in 1899. The See of Ipswich has been in abeyance since before the diocesan see including that city's name was created; a new second suffragan see – of Lynn – was therefore founded in 1963.

Alternative episcopal oversight (for parishes in the diocese which do not accept the ordination of women as priests) is provided by the provincial episcopal visitor, Norman Banks, Bishop suffragan of Richborough, who is licensed as an honorary assistant bishop of the diocese to facilitate his ministry. There are also seven retired bishops living in the diocese who are licensed as honorary assistant bishops:

- 2000–20??: Malcolm Menin, retired Bishop suffragan of Knaresborough, lived in Lakenham.
- 2001–present: Richard Garrard, retired Director of the Anglican Centre in Rome & Archbishop's Representative to the Holy See and former Bishop of Penrith, lives in Upper Stoke and is also licensed in the Diocese in Europe.
- 2003–present: David Leake, retired Bishop of Argentina and former Presiding Bishop in the Southern Cone, lives in East Runton.
- 2004–present: Tony Foottit, retired Bishop suffragan of Lynn, lives in Reepham.
- 2006–present: Peter Fox, former Bishop of Port Moresby, Papua New Guinea is Vicar of the Lakenham Group.
- 2008–present: David Gillett, retired Bishop suffragan of Bolton, lives in Diss.
- 2009–present: Lindsay Urwin, Administrator of the Shrine of Our Lady of Walsingham, is a former area Bishop of Horsham. He is also licensed in Ely, Peterborough and Chichester dioceses.

== Archdeaconries and deaneries ==
The former deaneries of Ingworth and Sparham were combined in 2018. The deaneries of St Benet at Waxham and Tunstead were combined in 1996. The deanery of Hingham and Mitford was split between the deaneries of Dereham and Humbleyard in 1995.

Diocese	Archdeaconries	Rural Deaneries	Paid clergy	Churches	Population	People/clergy	People/church	Churches/clergy
Diocese of Norwich	Archdeaconry of Norwich	Deanery of Norwich East	21*	18*	51,915	2,472	2,884	0.86
Diocese of Norwich	Archdeaconry of Norwich	Deanery of Norwich North	13	18	95,891	7,376	5,327	1.38
Diocese of Norwich	Archdeaconry of Norwich	Deanery of Norwich South	9	12	69,598	7,733	5,800	1.33
Diocese of Norwich	Archdeaconry of Norfolk	Deanery of Blofield	6	29	26,980	4,497	930	4.83
Diocese of Norwich	Archdeaconry of Norfolk	Deanery of Depwade	6	28	18,156	3,026	648	4.67
Diocese of Norwich	Archdeaconry of Norfolk	Deanery of Great Yarmouth	9	28	93,777	10,420	3,349	3.11
Diocese of Norwich	Archdeaconry of Norfolk	Deanery of Humbleyard	12	32	38,824	3,235	1,213	2.67
Diocese of Norwich	Archdeaconry of Norfolk	Deanery of Loddon	6	37	21,276	3,546	575	6.17
Diocese of Norwich	Archdeaconry of Norfolk	Deanery of Lothingland	13	23	82,200	6,323	3,574	1.77
Diocese of Norwich	Archdeaconry of Norfolk	Deanery of Redenhall	6	30	29,556	4,926	985	5
Diocese of Norwich	Archdeaconry of Norfolk	Deanery of St Benet at Waxham & Tunstead	8	45	37,081	4,635	824	5.63
Diocese of Norwich	Archdeaconry of Norfolk	Deanery of Thetford & Rockland	9	28	48,318	5,369	1,726	3.11
Diocese of Norwich	Archdeaconry of Lynn	Deanery of Breckland	7	39	33,639	4,806	863	5.57
Diocese of Norwich	Archdeaconry of Lynn	Deanery of Burnham & Walsingham	8**	46**	22,636	2,830	492	5.75
Diocese of Norwich	Archdeaconry of Lynn	Deanery of Dereham in Mitford	11	55	46,891	4,263	853	5
Diocese of Norwich	Archdeaconry of Lynn	Deanery of Heacham & Rising	7	26	23,295	3,328	896	3.71
Diocese of Norwich	Archdeaconry of Lynn	Deanery of Holt	7	37	14,485	2,069	391	5.29
Diocese of Norwich	Archdeaconry of Lynn	Deanery of Ingworth & Sparham	10	57	31,640	3,164	555	5.7
Diocese of Norwich	Archdeaconry of Lynn	Deanery of Lynn	13	21	55,983	4,306	2,666	1.62
Diocese of Norwich	Archdeaconry of Lynn	Deanery of Repps	6	28	29,099	4,850	1,039	4.67
Total/average			187	637	871,240	4,659	1,368	3.41

*including Cathedral

**including Walsingham Shrine

== Churches ==
=== Not in a deanery ===
Benefice	Churches	Founded	Clergy	Population served
Cathedral	Cathedral of the Holy and Undivided Trinity, Norwich	Medieval	A. Bryant; A. Platten; P. Doll; K. James	215
	Shrine Church of Our Lady of Walsingham		K. Smith	

=== Deanery of Norwich East ===
Benefice	Churches	Link	Founded	Clergy	Population served
Norwich (St Andrew)	St Andrew, Norwich		Medieval	M. Young	33
Norwich Colegate and Tombland	St George Colegate, Norwich		Medieval	A. Lewis	1,732
Norwich Colegate and Tombland	St George Tombland, Norwich		Medieval	A. Lewis	1,732
Norwich (St Giles)	St Giles, Norwich		Medieval	D. Thornton	2,321
Norwich (St Helen)	St Helen, Norwich		Medieval	E. Langan	332
Norwich Timberhill with Norwich St Julian	St Julian, Norwich		Medieval	R. Stanton	3,798
Norwich Timberhill with Norwich St Julian	St John the Baptist, Timberhill		Medieval	R. Stanton	3,798
Norwich (St Peter Mancroft) (St John Maddermarket)	St Peter Mancroft, Norwich		Medieval	E. Carter; G. Kirk-Spriggs; F. Haworth	341
Norwich (St Stephen)	St Stephen, Norwich		Medieval	M. Light; A. Irving	1,116
Norwich Heartsease	St Francis, Heartsease		1956	J. Wyer; T. Sibanda	5,775
Norwich Lakenham (St Mark)	St Mark, Lakenham		1840s	S. West-Lindell	2,842
Norwich, Lakenham (St John the Baptist and All Saints) and Tuckswood St Paul	St John the Baptist & All Saints, Lakenham		Medieval	P. Rider	8,444
Norwich, Lakenham (St John the Baptist and All Saints) and Tuckswood St Paul	St Paul, Tuckswood		1969	P. Rider	8,444
Thorpe (St Andrew) (Good Shepherd)	St Andrew, Thorpe St Andrew		Medieval (1860s)	J. Stewart	14,355
Thorpe (St Andrew) (Good Shepherd)	Good Shepherd, Thorpe			J. Stewart	14,355
Thorpe (St Matthew)	St Matthew, Thorpe Hamlet		1981	P. Jordan; T. Williams	9,566
Trowse (St Andrew)	St Andrew, Trowse		Medieval	R. Braby	1,045

=== Deanery of Norwich North ===
Benefice	Churches	Link	Founded	Clergy	Population served
New Catton (Christ Church)	Christ Church, New Catton		1840	P. Harvey	6,837
New Catton (St Luke) with St Augustine	St Luke, Norwich		1990	S. Quantrill	8,335
Old Catton	St Margaret, Old Catton		Medieval		8,500
Drayton	St Margaret, Drayton		Medieval	M. Palmer	4,908
Hellesdon	St Mary, Hellesdon		Medieval	A. Alder	12,523
Hellesdon	St Paul, Hellesdon		1950s?	A. Alder	12,523
Horsford, Felthorpe and Hevingham	St Margaret, Felthorpe		Medieval	M. McPhee	6,231
Horsford, Felthorpe and Hevingham	SS Mary the Virgin & Botolph, Hevingham		Medieval	M. McPhee	6,231
Horsford, Felthorpe and Hevingham	All Saints, Horsford		Medieval	M. McPhee	6,231
Horsham St Faith, Spixworth and Crostwick	St Peter, Crostwick			R. Maskell	6,046
Horsham St Faith, Spixworth and Crostwick	SS Andrew & Mary, Horsham St Faith		Medieval	R. Maskell	6,046
Horsham St Faith, Spixworth and Crostwick	St Peter, Spixworth		Medieval	R. Maskell	6,046
Mile Cross	St Catherine, Mile Cross		1936	M. Hartley	8,353
Norwich (St Mary Magdalene) with St James	St Mary Magdalene, Norwich		1902	L. Tillett	6,593
Sprowston with Beeston	SS Mary & Margaret, Sprowston			S. Stokes; D. Akrill; A. Bunter	16,591
Sprowston with Beeston	St Cuthbert, Sprowston		1886	S. Stokes; D. Akrill; A. Bunter	16,591
Taverham with Ringland	St Edmund, Tavenham			P. Seabrook	10,974
Taverham with Ringland	St Peter, Ringland			P. Seabrook	10,974

=== Deanery of Norwich South ===
Benefice	Churches	Link	Founded	Clergy	Population served
Bowthorpe	Bowthorpe Church (LEP)		1984	-	7,964
Costessey	St Edmund, Costessey		Medieval	J. Pinto	10,975
Costessey	St Helen, New Costessey		1975	J. Pinto	10,975
Earlham	St Anne, Earlham			D. Rowlandson	19,075
Earlham	St Elizabeth, Earlham			D. Rowlandson	19,075
Earlham	St Mary, Earlham (MED)		Medieval	D. Rowlandson	19,075
Eaton (Christ Church)	Christ Church, Eaton			P. Richmond	6,709
Eaton (St Andrew)	St Andrew, Eaton		Medieval	P. Rodd	5,262
Heigham	Holy Trinity, Heigham		1861	R. James; J. Pinto	5,737
The Mitre	St Thomas, Norwich		1886	T. Eagles; J. Payne; A. Poole	13,876
The Mitre	St Barnabas, Heigham		1903	T. Eagles; J. Payne; A. Poole	13,876
The Mitre	St Alban, Lakenham		1932	T. Eagles; J. Payne; A. Poole	13,876

=== Deanery of Blofield ===
Benefice	Churches	Link	Clergy	Population served
Acle and Bure to Yare	St Edmund King & Martyr, Acle; All Saints, Beighton; All Saints, Freethorpe; SS Peter & Paul, Halvergate; St Margaret, Cantley; St Botolph, Limpenhoe; St John the Baptist, Reedham; St Andrew, Wickhampton		M. Greenland	6,850
Blofield	SS Andrew & Peter, Blofield; St Andrew, Burlingham; All Saints, Hemblington		K. Billson	3,843
Broadside	St Helen, Ranworth; St Mary, Fishley (?); St Margaret, Upton; St Mary, South Walsham; SS Fabian & Sebastian, Woodbastwick		-	1,962
Burlingham with Lingwood, Strumpshaw with Hassingham and Buckenham	St Edmund King & Martyr, Burlingham; St Peter, Lingwood; St Mary, Hassingham; St Peter, Strumpshaw		D. Wakefield	3,079
Great and Little Plumstead, Rackheath with Salhouse and Witton	St Mary, Great Plumstead; SS Gervase & Protase, Little Plumstead; St David, Thorpe End (1993); St Margaret, Witton; Holy Trinity, Rackheath; All Saints, Salhouse		D. Plattin	6,877
The Yare Valley Churches	St Michael & All Angels, Braydeston; St Lawrence, Brundall; All Saints, Postwick		P. Leech	4,369

=== Deanery of Depwade ===
Benefice	Churches	Link	Clergy	Population served
Brooke, Kirstead, Mundham with Seething and Thwaite	St Peter, Brooke		L. Chapman	2,239
Brooke, Kirstead, Mundham with Seething and Thwaite	St Margaret, Kirstead		L. Chapman	2,239
Brooke, Kirstead, Mundham with Seething and Thwaite	St Peter, Mundham		L. Chapman	2,239
Brooke, Kirstead, Mundham with Seething and Thwaite	St Margaret, Seething		L. Chapman	2,239
Brooke, Kirstead, Mundham with Seething and Thwaite	St Mary, Thwaite		L. Chapman	2,239
Hempnall	St Margaret, Hempnall		M. Kingston; E. Billett	2,822
Hempnall	St Andrew, Bedingham		M. Kingston; E. Billett	2,822
Hempnall	St John the Baptist, Morningthorpe		M. Kingston; E. Billett	2,822
Hempnall	St Catherine, Fritton		M. Kingston; E. Billett	2,822
Hempnall	St Margaret, Hardwick		M. Kingston; E. Billett	2,822
Hempnall	St Mary, Shelton		M. Kingston; E. Billett	2,822
Hempnall	St Margaret, Topcroft		M. Kingston; E. Billett	2,822
Hempnall	All Saints, Woodton		M. Kingston; E. Billett	2,822
The Long Stratton and Pilgrim Team Ministry	All Saints, Carleton Rode		H. Wilcox; J. Madinda	7,575
The Long Stratton and Pilgrim Team Ministry	St Michael, Aslacton		H. Wilcox; J. Madinda	7,575
The Long Stratton and Pilgrim Team Ministry	St Michael & All Angels, Bunwell		H. Wilcox; J. Madinda	7,575
The Long Stratton and Pilgrim Team Ministry	St Michael, Great Moulton		H. Wilcox; J. Madinda	7,575
The Long Stratton and Pilgrim Team Ministry	St Mary, Stratton St Mary		H. Wilcox; J. Madinda	7,575
The Long Stratton and Pilgrim Team Ministry	St Michael, Stratton St Michael		H. Wilcox; J. Madinda	7,575
The Long Stratton and Pilgrim Team Ministry	All Saints, Tibenham		H. Wilcox; J. Madinda	7,575
The Long Stratton and Pilgrim Team Ministry	All Saints, Wacton		H. Wilcox; J. Madinda	7,575
Newton Flotman, Swainsthorpe, Tasburgh, Tharston, Saxlingham Nethergate and Shotesham	St Mary the Virgin, Newton Flotman		D. Davidson; A. Uzoigwe	5,520
Newton Flotman, Swainsthorpe, Tasburgh, Tharston, Saxlingham Nethergate and Shotesham	St Mary the Virgin, Saxlingham Nethergate		D. Davidson; A. Uzoigwe	5,520
Newton Flotman, Swainsthorpe, Tasburgh, Tharston, Saxlingham Nethergate and Shotesham	All Saints, Shotesham		D. Davidson; A. Uzoigwe	5,520
Newton Flotman, Swainsthorpe, Tasburgh, Tharston, Saxlingham Nethergate and Shotesham	St Mary, Shotesham		D. Davidson; A. Uzoigwe	5,520
Newton Flotman, Swainsthorpe, Tasburgh, Tharston, Saxlingham Nethergate and Shotesham	St Peter, Swainsthorpe		D. Davidson; A. Uzoigwe	5,520
Newton Flotman, Swainsthorpe, Tasburgh, Tharston, Saxlingham Nethergate and Shotesham	St Mary, Tasburgh		D. Davidson; A. Uzoigwe	5,520
Newton Flotman, Swainsthorpe, Tasburgh, Tharston, Saxlingham Nethergate and Shotesham	St Mary, Tharston		D. Davidson; A. Uzoigwe	5,520

=== Deanery of Great Yarmouth ===
Benefice	Churches	Link	Clergy	Population served
Belton and Burgh Castle	All Saints, Belton		R. Bunn	4,958
Belton and Burgh Castle	SS Peter & Paul, Burgh Castle		R. Bunn	4,958
Bradwell	St Nicholas, Bradwell		-	10,494
Caister Next Yarmouth	Holy Trinity, Caister-on-Sea		D. Wells	9,124
Caister Next Yarmouth	St Edmund, Caister-on-Sea		D. Wells	9,124
The Flegg Coastal Benefice	St Mary, Hemsby		J. Bloomfield	4,928
The Flegg Coastal Benefice	All Saints, Horsey		J. Bloomfield	4,928
The Flegg Coastal Benefice	St Mary, West Somerton		J. Bloomfield	4,928
The Flegg Coastal Benefice	Holy Trinity & All Saints, Winterton		J. Bloomfield	4,928
Gorleston (St Andrew)	St Andrew, Gorleston		B. Hall; M. Simm	15,889
Gorleston (St Mary Magdalene)	St Mary Magdalene, Gorleston		M. Price	9,480
Martham and Repps with Bastwick, Thurne and Clippesby	St Peter, Clippesby		S. Sivyer	4,271
Martham and Repps with Bastwick, Thurne and Clippesby	St Mary, Martham		S. Sivyer	4,271
Martham and Repps with Bastwick, Thurne and Clippesby	St Peter, Repps		S. Sivyer	4,271
Martham and Repps with Bastwick, Thurne and Clippesby	St Edmund, Thurne		S. Sivyer	4,271
Ormesby St Margaret with Scratby, Ormesby St Michael and Rollesby	St Margaret, Ormesby St Margaret		-	5,181
Ormesby St Margaret with Scratby, Ormesby St Michael and Rollesby	St Michael, Ormesby St Michael		-	5,181
Ormesby St Margaret with Scratby, Ormesby St Michael and Rollesby	St George, Rollesby		-	5,181
The South Trinity Broads	All Saints, Billockby		S. Hemsley Halls	2,322
The South Trinity Broads	SS Margaret & Mary, Burgh		S. Hemsley Halls	2,322
The South Trinity Broads	All Saints, Filby		S. Hemsley Halls	2,322
The South Trinity Broads	SS Peter & Paul, Mautby		S. Hemsley Halls	2,322
The South Trinity Broads	SS Peter & Paul, Runham		S. Hemsley Halls	2,322
The South Trinity Broads	St Andrew, Stokesby		S. Hemsley Halls	2,322
The South Trinity Broads	St Mary, Thrigby		S. Hemsley Halls	2,322
Great Yarmouth	Minster of St Nicholas, Great Yarmouth		S. Ward; J. Sander-Heys; H. Lynch	27,130
Great Yarmouth	St Paul, Great Yarmouth (1890s)		S. Ward; J. Sander-Heys; H. Lynch	27,130
Great Yarmouth	St Mary, Southtown		S. Ward; J. Sander-Heys; H. Lynch	27,130

=== Deanery of Humbleyard ===
Benefice	Churches	Link	Clergy	Population served
Cringleford and Colney	St Andrew, Colney		G. Wilkins; T. Yau	3,108
Cringleford and Colney	St Peter, Cringleford		G. Wilkins; T. Yau	3,108
Hethersett with Canteloff with Little Melton and Great Melton	St Remigius, Hethersett		D. McClean	6,745
Hethersett with Canteloff with Little Melton and Great Melton	All Saints, Great Melton		D. McClean	6,745
Hethersett with Canteloff with Little Melton and Great Melton	All Saints, Little Melton		D. McClean	6,745
High Oak, Hingham and Scoulton with Wood Rising	St Andrew, Deopham		C. Reed; S. Wallace-Jones	5,342
High Oak, Hingham and Scoulton with Wood Rising	St Mary the Virgin, Hackford		C. Reed; S. Wallace-Jones	5,342
High Oak, Hingham and Scoulton with Wood Rising	St Botolph, Morley St Botolph		C. Reed; S. Wallace-Jones	5,342
High Oak, Hingham and Scoulton with Wood Rising	St Peter, Morley St Peter		C. Reed; S. Wallace-Jones	5,342
High Oak, Hingham and Scoulton with Wood Rising	St Andrew & All Saints, Wicklewood		C. Reed; S. Wallace-Jones	5,342
High Oak, Hingham and Scoulton with Wood Rising	St Andrew, Higham		C. Reed; S. Wallace-Jones	5,342
High Oak, Hingham and Scoulton with Wood Rising	Holy Trinity, Scoulton		C. Reed; S. Wallace-Jones	5,342
High Oak, Hingham and Scoulton with Wood Rising	St Nicholas, Woodrising		C. Reed; S. Wallace-Jones	5,342
Mulbarton with Kenningham, Bracon Ash, Hethel and Flordon	St Mary Magdalene, Mulbarton		A. Miller	4,289
Mulbarton with Kenningham, Bracon Ash, Hethel and Flordon	St Nicholas, Bracon Ash		A. Miller	4,289
Mulbarton with Kenningham, Bracon Ash, Hethel and Flordon	St Michael, Flordon		A. Miller	4,289
Mulbarton with Kenningham, Bracon Ash, Hethel and Flordon	All Saints, Hethel		A. Miller	4,289
Swardeston with East Carleton, Intwood, Keswick and Ketteringham	St Mary the Virgin, Swardeston		P. Burr	1,559
Swardeston with East Carleton, Intwood, Keswick and Ketteringham	St Mary, East Carleton		P. Burr	1,559
Swardeston with East Carleton, Intwood, Keswick and Ketteringham	All Saints, Intwood		P. Burr	1,559
Swardeston with East Carleton, Intwood, Keswick and Ketteringham	All Saints, Keswick		P. Burr	1,559
Swardeston with East Carleton, Intwood, Keswick and Ketteringham	St Peter, Ketteringham		P. Burr	1,559
Upper Tas Valley	St Nicholas, Fundenhall		L. Avery	3,400
Upper Tas Valley	All Saints, Ashwellthorpe		L. Avery	3,400
Upper Tas Valley	St Mary, Forncett		L. Avery	3,400
Upper Tas Valley	St Peter, Forncett		L. Avery	3,400
Upper Tas Valley	St Edmund, Forncett End		L. Avery	3,400
Upper Tas Valley	St Margaret, Hapton		L. Avery	3,400
Upper Tas Valley	All Saints, Tacolneston		L. Avery	3,400
Upper Tas Valley	All Saints, Wreningham		L. Avery	3,400
Wymondham	SS Mary & Thomas, Wymondham		C. Relf-Pennington; S. Sealy	14,381
Wymondham	Spooner Row Church (1842)		C. Relf-Pennington; S. Sealy	14,381

=== Deanery of Loddon ===
Benefice	Churches	Link	Clergy	Population served
Gillingham with Geldeston with Stockton with Ellingham St Mary and Kirby Cane	St Mary, Ellingham		D. Smith	4,954
Gillingham with Geldeston with Stockton with Ellingham St Mary and Kirby Cane	St Michael, Geldeston		D. Smith	4,954
Gillingham with Geldeston with Stockton with Ellingham St Mary and Kirby Cane	St Mary, Gillingham		D. Smith	4,954
Gillingham with Geldeston with Stockton with Ellingham St Mary and Kirby Cane	All Saints, Kirby Cane		D. Smith	4,954
Gillingham with Geldeston with Stockton with Ellingham St Mary and Kirby Cane	St Michael & All Angels, Stockton		D. Smith	4,954
The Raveningham Group	St Mary, Aldeby		D. Smith	4,954
The Raveningham Group	St Mary, Burgh St Peter		D. Smith	4,954
The Raveningham Group	St Mary, Haddiscoe		D. Smith	4,954
The Raveningham Group	St Mary, Norton Subcourse		D. Smith	4,954
The Raveningham Group	St Andrew, Raveningham		D. Smith	4,954
The Raveningham Group	St Matthias, Thorpe-next-Haddiscoe		D. Smith	4,954
The Raveningham Group	All Saints, Thurlton		D. Smith	4,954
The Raveningham Group	St Margaret, Toft Monks		D. Smith	4,954
The Raveningham Group	All Saints, Wheatacre		D. Smith	4,954
Loddon, Sisland, Chedgrave, Hardley and Langley	All Saints, Chedgrave		D. Owen	4,842
Loddon, Sisland, Chedgrave, Hardley and Langley	St Margaret, Hardley		D. Owen	4,842
Loddon, Sisland, Chedgrave, Hardley and Langley	St Michael, Langley		D. Owen	4,842
Loddon, Sisland, Chedgrave, Hardley and Langley	Holy Trinity, Loddon		D. Owen	4,842
Loddon, Sisland, Chedgrave, Hardley and Langley	St Mary, Sisland		D. Owen	4,842
Poringland	St Andrew, Framingham Earl		R. Parsonage	4,764
Poringland	St Mary the Virgin, Howe		R. Parsonage	4,764
Poringland	All Saints, Poringland		R. Parsonage	4,764
Rockland St Mary With Hellington, Bramerton, Surlingham, Claxton, Carleton St Peter and Kirby Bedon with Whitlingham	St Peter, Bramerton		N. Garrard	2,580
Rockland St Mary With Hellington, Bramerton, Surlingham, Claxton, Carleton St Peter and Kirby Bedon with Whitlingham	St Peter, Carleton		N. Garrard	2,580
Rockland St Mary With Hellington, Bramerton, Surlingham, Claxton, Carleton St Peter and Kirby Bedon with Whitlingham	St Andrew, Claxton		N. Garrard	2,580
Rockland St Mary With Hellington, Bramerton, Surlingham, Claxton, Carleton St Peter and Kirby Bedon with Whitlingham	St Andrew, Kirby Bedon		N. Garrard	2,580
Rockland St Mary With Hellington, Bramerton, Surlingham, Claxton, Carleton St Peter and Kirby Bedon with Whitlingham	St Mary, Rockland St Mary		N. Garrard	2,580
Rockland St Mary With Hellington, Bramerton, Surlingham, Claxton, Carleton St Peter and Kirby Bedon with Whitlingham	St Mary, Surlingham		N. Garrard	2,580
Stoke Holy Cross with Dunston, Arminghall and Caistor St Edmunds with Markshall	Holy Cross, Stoke Holy Cross		R. Baker	1,977
Stoke Holy Cross with Dunston, Arminghall and Caistor St Edmunds with Markshall	St Mary, Arminghall		R. Baker	1,977
Stoke Holy Cross with Dunston, Arminghall and Caistor St Edmunds with Markshall	St Edmund, Caistor St Edmund		R. Baker	1,977
Stoke Holy Cross with Dunston, Arminghall and Caistor St Edmunds with Markshall	St Remigius, Dunston		R. Baker	1,977
Thurton with Ashby St Mary, Bergh Apton with Yelverton and Framingham Pigot	St Mary, Ashby		C. Ellis	2,159
Thurton with Ashby St Mary, Bergh Apton with Yelverton and Framingham Pigot	SS Peter & Paul, Bergh Apton		C. Ellis	2,159
Thurton with Ashby St Mary, Bergh Apton with Yelverton and Framingham Pigot	St Andrew, Framingham Pigot		C. Ellis	2,159
Thurton with Ashby St Mary, Bergh Apton with Yelverton and Framingham Pigot	St Ethelbert, Thurton		C. Ellis	2,159
Thurton with Ashby St Mary, Bergh Apton with Yelverton and Framingham Pigot	St Mary, Yelverton		C. Ellis	2,159

=== Deanery of Lothingland ===
Benefice	Churches	Link	Clergy	Population served	Ref
Carlton Colville (St Peter) and Mutford	St Peter, Carlton Colville; St Andrew, Mutford		Vicar: Jeremy Bishop	8,952	
Gunton St Peter (St Benedict)	St Benedict, Gunton; St Peter, Gunton		Rector: Trevor Riess	5,973	
Hopton (St Margaret) with Corton	St Bartholomew, Corton; St Margaret, Hopton		Vicar: Roger Key	4,430	
Kessingland (St Edmund), Gisleham and Rushmere	St Edmund, Kessingland; Holy Trinity, Gisleham; St Michael, Rushmere		Rector: Janet Wyer	5,140	
Kirkley (St Peter and St John)	SS Peter & John, Kirkley		Rector: Eoin Buchanan	10,031	
Lowestoft (Christ Church)	Christ Church, Lowestoft		Vicar: Matthew Payne; Curate: Jonathan Carter	2,500	
Lowestoft (St Andrew)	St Andrew, Lowestoft (1902)		Vicar: Damon Rogers; Curate: Nicholas Ktorides	6,312	
Lowestoft (St Margaret)	St Margaret, Lowestoft		Rector: Mike Asquith	11,067	
Oulton (St Michael)	St Michael, Oulton		Priest-in-Charge: David Hayden; OLM (Oulton Broad): Josephine Fowler; OLM (Oulton Broad): Margaret Barnes	19,097	
Oulton Broad (St Mark) (St Luke the Evangelist)	St Mark, Oulton Broad; St Luke the Evangelist, Oulton Broad		Priest-in-Charge: David Hayden; OLM (Oulton Broad): Josephine Fowler; OLM (Oulton Broad): Margaret Barnes	19,097	
Pakefield (All Saints and St Margaret)	All Saints & St Margaret, Pakefield		Rector: Sharon Lord	5,699	
Somerleyton (St Mary), Ashby, Fritton, Herringfleet, Blundeston and Lound	St Mary, Somerleyton; St Mary, Ashby; St Mary, Blundeston; St Edmund, Fritton; St Margaret, Herringfleet; St John the Baptist, Lound		Rector: Glen Brooks	2,999	

=== Deanery of Redenhall ===
Benefice	Churches	Link	Clergy	Population served	Ref
Dickleburgh (All Saints) and the Pulhams	All Saints, Dickleburgh; St Mary Magdalene, Pulham Market; St Mary the Virgin, Pulham St Mary; St Mary, Rushall; St Margaret, Starston; St Andrew, Thelveton		Rector: Vacant; OLM: Paul Schwier; OLM: David Adlam	3,915	
Diss Team Ministry, the (St Mary), Including Bressingham, Fersfield, North Lopham, Roydon, and South Lopham	St Mary, Diss; St John the Baptist, Bressingham; St Andrew, Fersfield; St Nicholas, North Lopham; St Remigius, Roydon; St Andrew, South Lopham		Team Rector: Tony Billett; Team Vicar: John Cruse; Curate: Samuel Thorp; OLM: Margaret Swayze	12,166	
Ditchingham (St Mary), Hedenham, Broome, Earsham, Alburgh and Denton	All Saints, Alburgh (MED); St Michael, Broome (MED); St Mary, Denton (MED); St Mary, Ditchingham (MED); All Saints, Earsham (MED); St Peter, Hedenham (MED)		Rector: Chris Hutton; OLM: Sue Cramp; OLM: Reginald Kirkpatrick	3,882	
Redenhall (Assumption of the Blessed Virgin Mary) with Scole	St Leonard, Billingford; SS Peter & Paul, Brockdish; St Peter, Needham; St John the Baptist, Harleston; Assumption of the Blessed Virgin Mary, Redenhall; St Andrew, Scole; All Saints, Thorpe Abbots		Rector: Nigel Tuffnell; NSM: Tim Rogers; OLM: Susan Auckland	7,401	
Winfarthing (St Mary) with Shelfanger with Burston with Gissing and Tivetshall	St Mary, Burston; St Mary the Virgin, Gissing; All Saints, Shelfanger; SS Mary & Margaret, Tivetshall; St Mary, Winfarthing		Rector: David Mills	2,192	

=== Deanery of St Benet at Waxham & Tunstead ===
Benefice	Churches	Link	Clergy	Population served	Ref
Ashmanhaugh (St Swithin), Barton Turf, Beeston St Laurence, Horning, Irstead and Neatishead	St Swithin, Ashmanhaugh; St Michael & All Angels, Barton Turf; St Lawrence, Beeston; St Benedict, Horning; St Michael, Irstead; St Peter, Neatishead		Rector: David Smith	2,304	
Bacton (St Andrew), Happisburgh, Hempstead with Eccles and Lessingham, Ridlington, Sea Palling with Waxham, Walcott, and Witton	St Andrew, Bacton; St Mary, Happisburgh; St Andrew, Hempstead; All Saints, Lessingham; St Peter, Ridlington; St Margaret, Sea Palling; St John the Evangelist, Great Waxham; All Saints, Walcott; St Margaret, Witton		Rector: Catherine Dobson	3,900	
King's Beck, Comprising Banningham, Colby, Felmingham, Skeyton, Sloley, Suffield, Swanton Abbot, and Tuttington	St Botolph, Banningham; St Giles, Colby; St Andrew, Felmingham; All Saints, Skeyton; St Margaret, Suffield; SS Peter & Paul, Tuttington; St Bartholomew, Sloley; St Michael, Swanton Abbot		Rector: Keith Dally	2,309	
Ludham (St Catherine), Potter Heigham, Hickling and Catfield	All Saints, Catfield; St Mary, Hickling; St Catherine, Ludham; St Nicholas, Potter Heigham		Vicar: Deborah Hamilton-Grey	4,203	
Smallburgh (St Peter) with Dilham with Honing and Crostwight	St Nicholas, Dilham; All Saints, Crostwight; SS Peter & Paul, Honing; St Peter, Smallburgh		Rector: Simon Habgood	6,414	
Stalham (St Mary), East Ruston, Brunstead, Sutton and Ingham	Holy Trinity, Ingham; St Mary, Stalham; St Peter, Brunstead; St Michael, Sutton; St Mary, East Ruston (village hall)		Rector: Simon Habgood	6,414	
Walsham, North (St Nicholas), Edingthorpe, Worstead and Westwick	St Nicholas, North Walsham		Vicar: Paul Cubitt; Curate: Rachael Dines; OLM: Nigel Paterson	13,813	
Walsham, North (St Nicholas), Edingthorpe, Worstead and Westwick	All Saints, Edingthorpe; St Botolph, Westwick; St Mary, Worstead		Vicar: Paul Cubitt; Curate: Rachael Dines; OLM: Nigel Paterson	13,813	
Wroxham (St Mary) with Hoveton St John with Hoveton St Peter, Belaugh and Tunstead with Sco' Ruston	St Peter, Belaugh; St John the Baptist, Hoveton; St Peter, Hoveton; St Mary, Wroxham; St Mary, Tunstead		Rector: Liz Jump	4,138	

=== Deanery of Thetford & Rockland ===
Benefice	Churches	Link	Clergy	Population served	Ref
Attleborough (Assumption of the Blessed Virgin Mary) with Besthorpe	Assumption of the Blessed Virgin Mary, Attleborough; All Saints, Besthorpe		Rector and Rural Dean: Matthew Jackson; Asst. Priest: Andrew Slater	11,272	
Ellingham, Great (St James), Little (St Peter), Rockland All Saints, Rockland St Peter and Shropham with Snetterton	St James, Great Ellingham; St Peter, Little Ellingham; All Saints, Rockland; St Peter, Rockland; St Peter, Shropham		Priest-in-Charge: Christina Mason; Hon. Curate: Preb. Sue Strutt	2,704	
Guiltcross, Comprising Blo' Norton, Garboldisham, Kenninghall, and Riddlesworth	St Andrew, Blo' Norton; St John the Baptist, Garboldisham; St Mary, Kenninghall; St Peter, Riddlesworth		Priest-in-Charge: Derrick Sheppard	2,075	
Harling, East (St Peter and St Paul) with West, Bridgham with Roudham, Larling, Brettenham and Rushford	St Andrew, Brettenham; St Mary, Bridgham; SS Peter & Paul, East Harling; St Ethelbert, Larling; St John the Evangelist, Rushford		Priest-in-Charge: David Smith; OLM: Lynn Fry; OLM: Caryll Brown	2,994	
Quidenham Group, the (St Andrew), Including Banham, Eccles, New Buckenham, Old Buckenham, and Wilby	St Mary the Virgin, Banham; St Martin, New Buckenham; All Saints, Old Buckenham; St Mary the Virgin, Eccles; St Andrew, Quidenham; All Saints, Wilby		Priest-in-Charge: Steve Wright	3,757	
Thetford (St Cuthbert) St Peter	St Cuthbert, Thetford; All Saints, Croxton; St Andrew, Kilverstone; St Ethelbert, Wretham; Cloverfield Church		Team Rector: Peter Herbert; Team Vicar: Helen Jary; Team Vicar: Tony Heywood	25,516	
Thetford (St Cuthbert) St Peter	Grace Church Thetford		Team Rector: Peter Herbert; Team Vicar: Helen Jary; Team Vicar: Tony Heywood	25,516	

=== Deanery of Breckland ===
Benefice	Churches	Link	Clergy	Population served	Ref
Ashill (St Nicholas), Carbrooke, Ovington and Saham Toney	St Nicholas, Ashill; St George, Saham Toney; SS Peter & Paul, Carbrooke; St John the Evangelist, Ovington		Vicar: Jane Atkins	5,221	
Caston (St Cross), Griston, Merton, Thompson, Stow Bedon, Breckles and Great Hockham	St Margaret, Breckles; St Cross, Caston; SS Peter & Paul, Griston; Holy Trinity, Great Hockham; St Peter, Merton; St Botolph, Stow Bedon; St Martin, Thompson		Rector: Vacant; Hon. Curate: Adrian Bell	3,450	
Cockley Cley (All Saints) with Gooderstone	All Saints, Cockley Cley; St George, Gooderstone		Priest-in-Charge: Vacant	525	
Didlington (St Michael)	St Michael, Didlington		Priest-in-Charge: Vacant	525	
Cranwich (St Mary)	St Mary, Cranwich		Priest-in-Charge: Vacant	280	
Ickburgh (St Peter) with Langford	St Peter, Ickburgh		Priest-in-Charge: Vacant	280	
Hilborough (All Saints) with Bodney	St Mary, Bodney; All Saints, Hilborough		Priest-in-Charge: Zoe Ferguson	2,501	
Oxborough (St John the Evangelist) with Foulden and Caldecote	All Saints, Foulden; St John the Evangelist, Oxborough		Priest-in-Charge: Zoe Ferguson	2,501	
Mundford (St Leonard) with Lynford	St Leonard, Mundford		Priest-in-Charge: Zoe Ferguson	2,501	
Watton (St Mary)	St Mary, Watton		Vicar/Curate: Geraldine Foster	7,638	
Cressingham, Great (St Michael) and Little (St Andrew), with Threxton	St Michael, Great Cressingham; St Andrew, Little Cressingham; All Saints, Threxton		Vicar/Curate: Geraldine Foster	7,638	
Fountain of Life Extra-Parochial Place	Fountain of Life Network Church, Ashill (1999)		Minister: Steve Mawditt; OLM: Paul Wilkinson	N/A	
Nar Valley, The, Comprising Castle Acre, Narborough, Newton-By-Castle Acre, Pentney, South Acre, and West Acre	St James, Castle Acre; All Saints, Narborough; St Mary, Narford; All Saints, Newton-by-Castle-Acre; St Mary Magdalene, Pentney; St George, South Acre; All Saints, West Acre		Rector: Stuart Nairn; NSM: Richard Howells	2,782	
Necton (All Saints), Holme Hale with Pickenham, North and South	All Saints, Necton		Rector: Stephen Thorp	2,977	
Necton (All Saints), Holme Hale with Pickenham, North and South	St Andrew, Holme Hale		Rector: Stephen Thorp	2,977	
Necton (All Saints), Holme Hale with Pickenham, North and South	St Andrew, North Pickenham; All Saints, South Pickenham		Rector: Stephen Thorp	2,977	
Swaffham (St Peter and St Paul) and Sporle	SS Peter & Paul, Swaffham		Vicar: Janet Allan; NSM: Hilary de Lyon	8,265	
Swaffham (St Peter and St Paul) and Sporle	St Mary, Sporle		Vicar: Janet Allan; NSM: Hilary de Lyon	8,265	

=== Deanery of Burnham & Walsingham ===
Benefice	Churches	Link	Clergy	Population served	Ref
Barney (St Mary), Hindringham, Thursford, Great Snoring, Little Snoring and Kettlestone and Pensthorpe	St Mary, Barney; St Martin, Hindringham; All Saints, Kettlestone; St Mary, Great Snoring; St Andrew, Little Snoring; St Andrew, Thursford		Rector: James Muggleton	1,843	
Burnham Westgate (St Mary), Burnham Norton, Burnham Overy, Burnham Thorpe, and Burnham Sutton with Ulph (The Burnham Group of Parishes)	St Mary, Burnham Market; St Margaret, Burnham Norton; St Clement, Burnham Overy; All Saints, Burnham Thorpe; All Saints, Burnham Sutton cum Ulph		Rector: Vacant	1,326	
Creake, North (St Mary) and South (St Mary) with Waterden, Syderstone with Barmer and Sculthorpe	St Mary, North Creake		Rector: Clive Wylie	2,755	
Creake, North (St Mary) and South (St Mary) with Waterden, Syderstone with Barmer and Sculthorpe	St Mary & All Saints, Sculthorpe		Rector: Clive Wylie	2,755	
Creake, North (St Mary) and South (St Mary) with Waterden, Syderstone with Barmer and Sculthorpe	St Mary, South Creake; All Saints, Waterden		Rector: Clive Wylie	2,755	
Creake, North (St Mary) and South (St Mary) with Waterden, Syderstone with Barmer and Sculthorpe	St Mary, Syderstone		Rector: Clive Wylie	2,755	
Fakenham (St Peter and St Paul) with Alethorpe	SS Peter & Paul, Fakenham		Rector/Priest-in-Charge: Francis Mason	8,002	
Fulmodeston (Christ Church) with Croxton	Christ Church, Fulmodeston		Rector/Priest-in-Charge: Francis Mason	8,002	
Hempton (Holy Trinity) and Pudding Norton	Holy Trinity, Hempton		Priest-in-Charge: John Burgess	738	
Holkham (St Withiburga) with Egmere with Warham, Wells-Next-The-Sea and Wighton	St Withburga, Holkham; All Saints, Warham; St Mary Magdalene, Warham; St Nicholas, Wells-next-the-Sea		Rector: Brenda Stewart	2,843	
Holkham (St Withiburga) with Egmere with Warham, Wells-Next-The-Sea and Wighton	All Saints, Wighton		Rector: Brenda Stewart	2,843	
Rudham, East and West (St Mary), Helhoughton, Houghton-Next-Harpley, the Raynhams, Tatterford, and Tattersett	St Mary, East & West Rudham; All Saints, Helhoughton; St Martin, Houghton-next-Harpley; St Mary, East Raynham; St Martin, South Raynham; St Margaret, Tatterford; All Saints & St Andrew, Tattersett		Rector (Rudham etc): Edward Bundock	1,713	
Toftrees (All Saints)	All Saints, Toftrees		Rector (Rudham etc): Edward Bundock	1,713	
Walsingham (St Mary and All Saints) (St Peter), Houghton and Barsham	All Saints, East Barsham; All Saints, North Barsham; Assumption of the Blessed Virgin Mary, West Barsham; St Mary and All Saints, Little Walsingham; St Giles, Houghton; St Peter, Great Walsingham		Vicar: Harri Williams	1,011	
Wensum Village Group, Upper, Comprising Brisley, Colkirk with Oxwick with Pattesley, Gateley, Great Ryburgh, Horningtoft, Shereford with Dunton, and Whissonsett	St Andrew, Great Ryburgh		Rector: Robin Stapleford	2,405	
Wensum Village Group, Upper, Comprising Brisley, Colkirk with Oxwick with Pattesley, Gateley, Great Ryburgh, Horningtoft, Shereford with Dunton, and Whissonsett	St Bartholomew, Brisley; St Mary, Colkirk; St Helen, Gateley; St Edmund, Horningtoft; St Nicholas, Shereford; St Mary, Whissonsett		Rector: Robin Stapleford	2,405	

=== Deanery of Dereham in Mitford ===
Benefice	Churches	Link	Clergy	Population served
Barnham Broom and Upper Yare	St Botolph, Barford		T. Weatherstone; L. Pittman	3,287
Barnham Broom and Upper Yare	SS Peter & Paul, Barnham Broom		T. Weatherstone; L. Pittman	3,287
Barnham Broom and Upper Yare	All Saints, Brandon Parva		T. Weatherstone; L. Pittman	3,287
Barnham Broom and Upper Yare	St Mary, Carlton Forehoe		T. Weatherstone; L. Pittman	3,287
Barnham Broom and Upper Yare	St Mary the Virgin, Cranworth		T. Weatherstone; L. Pittman	3,287
Barnham Broom and Upper Yare	St Andrew, Southbergh		T. Weatherstone; L. Pittman	3,287
Barnham Broom and Upper Yare	St Margaret, Garveston		T. Weatherstone; L. Pittman	3,287
Barnham Broom and Upper Yare	St George, Hardingham		T. Weatherstone; L. Pittman	3,287
Barnham Broom and Upper Yare	St Peter, Kimberley		T. Weatherstone; L. Pittman	3,287
Barnham Broom and Upper Yare	St Peter, Reymerston		T. Weatherstone; L. Pittman	3,287
Barnham Broom and Upper Yare	All Saints, Runhall		T. Weatherstone; L. Pittman	3,287
Barnham Broom and Upper Yare	St Paul, Thuxton		T. Weatherstone; L. Pittman	3,287
Barnham Broom and Upper Yare	St Andrew, Westfield		T. Weatherstone; L. Pittman	3,287
Barnham Broom and Upper Yare	St Mary, Whinburgh		T. Weatherstone; L. Pittman	3,287
Barnham Broom and Upper Yare	SS Peter & Paul, Wramplingham		T. Weatherstone; L. Pittman	3,287
Dereham and District	St Nicholas, East Dereham		G. Wells; J. Rosie	27,938
Dereham and District	St Mary, Beetley		G. Wells; J. Rosie	27,938
Dereham and District	St Mary, East Bilney		G. Wells; J. Rosie	27,938
Dereham and District	St Andrew, West Bradenham		G. Wells; J. Rosie	27,938
Dereham and District	St Andrew, Hoe		G. Wells; J. Rosie	27,938
Dereham and District	SS Peter & Paul, Scarning		G. Wells; J. Rosie	27,938
Dereham and District	All Saints, Shipdham		G. Wells; J. Rosie	27,938
Dereham and District	All Saints, Swanton Morley		G. Wells; J. Rosie	27,938
Easton, Colton, Marlingford and Bawburgh	SS Mary & Walstan, Bawburgh		L. Montgomery	4,502
Easton, Colton, Marlingford and Bawburgh	St Andrew, Colton		L. Montgomery	4,502
Easton, Colton, Marlingford and Bawburgh	St Peter, Easton		L. Montgomery	4,502
Easton, Colton, Marlingford and Bawburgh	Assumption of the Blessed Virgin Mary, Marlingford		L. Montgomery	4,502
Honingham	St Andrew, Honingham		-	341
Honingham	St Paul's Chapel, Honingham		-	341
Launditch and the Upper Nar	St Mary the Virgin, Beeston next Mileham		H. Butcher; J. Hemp; M. Fife	5,655
Launditch and the Upper Nar	SS Peter & Paul, Bittering Parva		H. Butcher; J. Hemp; M. Fife	5,655
Launditch and the Upper Nar	St Andrew, Great Dunham		H. Butcher; J. Hemp; M. Fife	5,655
Launditch and the Upper Nar	St Margaret, Little Dunham		H. Butcher; J. Hemp; M. Fife	5,655
Launditch and the Upper Nar	All Saints, Great Fransham		H. Butcher; J. Hemp; M. Fife	5,655
Launditch and the Upper Nar	St Mary, Little Fransham		H. Butcher; J. Hemp; M. Fife	5,655
Launditch and the Upper Nar	Assumption of the Blessed Virgin Mary, Gressenhall		H. Butcher; J. Hemp; M. Fife	5,655
Launditch and the Upper Nar	St Andrew, East Lexham		H. Butcher; J. Hemp; M. Fife	5,655
Launditch and the Upper Nar	St Nicholas, West Lexham		H. Butcher; J. Hemp; M. Fife	5,655
Launditch and the Upper Nar	All Saints, Litcham		H. Butcher; J. Hemp; M. Fife	5,655
Launditch and the Upper Nar	SS Andrew & Peter, Longham		H. Butcher; J. Hemp; M. Fife	5,655
Launditch and the Upper Nar	St John the Baptist, Mileham		H. Butcher; J. Hemp; M. Fife	5,655
Launditch and the Upper Nar	St Mary, Rougham		H. Butcher; J. Hemp; M. Fife	5,655
Launditch and the Upper Nar	St Margaret, Stanfield		H. Butcher; J. Hemp; M. Fife	5,655
Launditch and the Upper Nar	St Mary, Tittleshall		H. Butcher; J. Hemp; M. Fife	5,655
Launditch and the Upper Nar	All Saints, Weasenham		H. Butcher; J. Hemp; M. Fife	5,655
Launditch and the Upper Nar	St Peter, Weasenham		H. Butcher; J. Hemp; M. Fife	5,655
Launditch and the Upper Nar	St Andrew, Wellingham		H. Butcher; J. Hemp; M. Fife	5,655
Launditch and the Upper Nar	SS Peter & Paul, Wendling		H. Butcher; J. Hemp; M. Fife	5,655
Mattishall and the Tudd Valley	All Saints, East Tuddenham		M. McCaghrey; A. Woods	5,168
Mattishall and the Tudd Valley	St Michael, Hockering		M. McCaghrey; A. Woods	5,168
Mattishall and the Tudd Valley	All Saints, Mattishall		M. McCaghrey; A. Woods	5,168
Mattishall and the Tudd Valley	St Peter, Mattishall Burgh		M. McCaghrey; A. Woods	5,168
Mattishall and the Tudd Valley	St Mary the Virgin, North Tuddenham		M. McCaghrey; A. Woods	5,168
Mattishall and the Tudd Valley	All Saints, Welborne		M. McCaghrey; A. Woods	5,168
Mattishall and the Tudd Valley	St Peter, Yaxham		M. McCaghrey; A. Woods	5,168

=== Deanery of Heacham & Rising ===
Benefice	Churches	Link	Clergy	Population served	Ref
Castle Rising (St Lawrence)	St Lawrence, Castle Rising		Rector: Jonathan Riviere; NSM (Sandringham): Paul Gismondi	1,178	
Sandringham (St Mary Magdalene) with West Newton and Appleton, Wolferton with Babingley and Flitcham	St Mary the Virgin, Flitcham; SS Peter & Paul, West Newton; St Mary Magdalene, Sandringham; St Peter, Wolferton		Rector: Jonathan Riviere; NSM (Sandringham): Paul Gismondi	1,178	
Hillington (St Mary the Virgin)	St Mary the Virgin, Hillington		Rector: Jonathan Riviere; NSM (Sandringham): Paul Gismondi	1,178	
Dersingham (St Nicholas), Anmer, Ingoldisthorpe and Shernborne	St Nicholas, Dersingham; St Mary, Anmer; St Michael, Ingoldisthorpe; SS Peter & Paul, Shernborne		Rector: Mark Capron	5,557	
Docking (St Mary), the Birchams, Fring, Stanhoe and Sedgeford	St Mary, Docking; All Saints, Fring; St Mary, Sedgeford; All Saints, Stanhoe; St Mary the Virgin, Great Bircham; All Saints, Bircham Newton		Rector: Peter Cook; NSM: Richard Collier	2,527	
Heacham (St Mary) and Snettisham	St Mary the Virgin, Heacham; St Mary, Snettisham		Team Rector: Veronica Wilson; Team Vicar: Paul Niemiec	7,320	
Hunstanton (St Edmund) with Ringstead	St Edmund, Hunstanton; St Andrew, Ringstead		Vicar: John Bloomfield; NSM: Alexander Monro	4,417	
Hunstanton (St Mary) with Ringstead Parva, Holme-Next-The-Sea, Thornham, Brancaster, Burnham Deepdale and Titchwell	St Mary the Virgin, Brancaster; St Mary, Burnham Deepdale; St Mary, Holme-next-the-Sea; St Mary, Old Hunstanton; St Mary, Titchwell; All Saints, Thornham		Priest-in-Charge: Susan Bowden-Pickstock	2,296	

=== Deanery of Holt ===
Benefice	Churches	Link	Clergy	Population served	Ref
Matlaske (St Peter), Including Baconsthorpe, Barningham, Edgefield, Hempstead, Plumstead, and Saxthorpe with Corpusty	St Mary, Baconsthorpe; St Mary the Virgin, Barningham Winter; SS Peter & Paul, Edgefield; All Saints, Hempstead; St Peter, Matlaske; St Michael, Plumstead; St Andrew, Saxthorpe		Priest-in-Charge: William Cartwright	1,468	
Blakeney (St Nicholas with St Mary and St Thomas) with Cley, Wiveton, Glandford and Letheringsett	SS Nicholas, Mary & Thomas, Blakeney; St Margaret, Cley St Margaret; St Martin, Glandford; St Andrew, Letheringsett; St Mary, Wiveton		Rector: Vacant	1,511	
Brinton, Briningham, Hunworth, Stody, Swanton Novers and Thornage	St Maurice, Briningham; St Andrew's Church, Brinton; St Lawrence, Hunworth; St Mary, Stody; St Edmund, Swanton Novers; All Saints, Thornage		Rector: Jennifer Elliott de Riverol	825	
Briston (All Saints), Burgh Parva, Hindolveston and Melton Constable	All Saints, Briston; St Mary, Burgh Parva; St George the Martyr, Hindolveston; St Peter, Melton Constable		Rector: Jeremy Sykes	3,594	
Holt (St Andrew) with High Kelling	St Andrew the Apostle, Holt; All Saints, High Kelling		Rector: Howard Stoker; Curate: Stephen Graham	4,346	
Stiffkey (St John and St Mary) and Bale	St Mary & Holy Cross, Binham		Rector: Ian Whittle	1,629	
Stiffkey (St John and St Mary) and Bale	All Saints, Bale; St Andrew, Field Dalling; St Mary, Gunthorpe; SS Andrew & Mary, Langham Episcopi; All Saints, Morston; St Margaret, Saxlingham; All Saints, Sharrington; SS John & Mary, Stiffkey		Rector: Ian Whittle	1,629	
Weybourne (All Saints), Upper Sheringham, Kelling, Salthouse, Bodham and East and West Beckham (The Weybourne Group)	All Saints, Bodham; St Helen & All Saints, West Beckham; St Mary, Kelling; St Nicholas, Salthouse; All Saints, Upper Sheringham; All Saints, Weybourne		Rector: Philip Blamire	1,902	

=== Deanery of Ingworth and Sparham ===
Benefice	Churches	Link	Clergy	Population served	Ref
Aylsham (St Michael and All Angels) and District Team Ministry, The, Including Badersfield, Blickling, Brampton, Burgh-Next-Aylsham, Buxton with Oxnead, Cawston, Haveringland, Heydon, Itteringham with Mannington, Little Barningham, Marsham, Oulton with Imingland, and Wickmere with Wolterton	St Michael, Aylsham; Badersfield Community Church; St Andrew, Blickling; St Peter, Brampton; St Mary, Burgh-next-Aylsham; St Andrew, Buxton; St Michael & All Angels, Oxnead; St Agnes, Cawston; St Peter, Haveringland; SS Peter & Paul, Heydon; Itteringham Parish Church; St Andrew, Lammas; St Andrew, Little Barningham; All Saints, Marsham; SS Peter & Paul, Oulton; St Andrew, Wickmere		Team Rector: Andrew Beane; Team Vicar: Andrew Whitehead; Team Vicar: Dave Hagan-Palmer; Team Vicar: Deborah Cousins; Curate: Jack Branford; NSM: Peter Chapman	12,504	
Coltishall (St John the Baptist) with Great Hautbois, Frettenham, Hainford, Horstead and Stratton Strawless	St John the Baptist, Coltishall; St Swithin, Frettenham; All Saints, Hainford; All Saints, Horstead; St Margaret, Stratton Strawless		Rector: Christopher Engelsen; OLM: Keith Dignum	4,925	
Erpingham (St Mary) with Calthorpe, Ingworth, Aldborough, Thurgarton and Alby with Thwaite	St Ethelbert, Alby; St Mary, Erpingham; St Mary, Aldborough; Our Lady with St Margaret, Calthorpe; St Lawrence, Ingworth; All Saints, Thwaite		Priest-in-Charge: Vacant	1,514	
Heart of Norfolk Team Ministry, The, Comprising Bawdeswell, Billingford, Bintree, Foulsham, Foxley, Guestwick, Guist, North Elmham, Stibbard, Themelthorpe, Twyford, Wood Norton, and Worthing	All Saints, Bawdeswell; St Peter, Billingford; St Swithin, Bintree; St Mary, North Elmham; Holy Innocents, Foulsham; St Thomas, Foxley; St Peter, Guestwick; St Andrew, Guist; All Saints, Stibbard; St Andrew, Themelthorpe; St Nicholas, Twyford; All Saints, Wood Norton; St Margaret, Worthing		Team Rector: Sally Kimmis; Team Vicar: Christopher Davies	5,128	
Reepham (St Mary) and Wensum Valley Team Ministry, The, Including Alderford with Attlebridge, Bylaugh, Elsing, Great with Little Witchingham, Lyng, Reepham and Hackford with Whitwell and Kerdiston, Salle, Sparham, Swannington, Thurning, Wood Dalling, and Weston Longville with Morton-On-The-Hill	St Mary, Reepham; St Michael & All Angels, Whitwell; SS Peter & Paul, Salle; St Andrew, Thurning; St Andrew, Wood Dalling		Team Rector: Keith Rengert; Team Vicar: Helen Rengert	5,966	
Reepham (St Mary) and Wensum Valley Team Ministry, The, Including Alderford with Attlebridge, Bylaugh, Elsing, Great with Little Witchingham, Lyng, Reepham and Hackford with Whitwell and Kerdiston, Salle, Sparham, Swannington, Thurning, Wood Dalling, and Weston Longville with Morton-On-The-Hill	St John the Baptist, Alderford; St Andrew, Attlebridge; St Mary, Bylaugh; St Mary, Elsing; St Mary, Great Witchingham; St Margaret, Lyng; St Mary, Sparham; St Margaret, Swannington; All Saints, Weston Longueville		Team Rector: Keith Rengert; Team Vicar: Helen Rengert	5,966	
Scottow (All Saints)	All Saints, Scottow		Vacant	713	

=== Deanery of Lynn ===
Benefice	Churches	Link	Clergy	Population served	Ref
Ashwicken (All Saints) with Leziate, Bawsey and Mintlyn, Congham, E Walton, Gayton, Gayton Thorpe, Gt Massingham, Grimston, Harpley, Lt Massingham and Roydon	All Saints, Ashwicken; St Andrew, Congham; St Mary, Gayton Thorpe; St Nicholas, Gayton; St Mary, Great Massingham; St Botolph, Grimston; St Lawrence, Harpley; St Andrew, Little Massingham; All Saints, Roydon; St Mary, East Walton		Team Rector: Jane Holmes; Team Vicar: Judith Pollard	6,217	
The Church in the Woottons	All Saints, North Wootton; St Mary, South Wootton		Rector: James Nash; Curate: Dan Tansey; OLM: Linda Ashby	6,744	
Gaywood (St Faith) King's Lynn	St Faith, Gaywood		Team Rector: Julie Boyd; Curate: Karlene Kerr; Curate: Laura Purnell	20,434	
King's Lynn (St Margaret) with St Nicholas	Minster of St Margaret, King's Lynn		Team Rector (St Margaret): Christopher Ivory; Team Vicar/Vicar: Becca Rogers; Curate (St Margaret): Angela Rayner	10,357	
King's Lynn (St John the Evangelist)	St John the Evangelist, King's Lynn		Team Rector (St Margaret): Christopher Ivory; Team Vicar/Vicar: Becca Rogers; Curate (St Margaret): Angela Rayner	10,357	
Lynn, South (All Saints)	All Saints, South Lynn		Rector: Adrian Ling; Curate: Joshua Bell; OLM: Paul Norwood	6,639	
Middlewinch, Comprising East Winch with West Bilney, Middleton, North Runcton, and West Winch	All Saints, East Winch; St Mary, Middleton; All Saints, North Runcton; St Mary, Setchey; St Mary, West Winch		Rector: Riaz Mubarak	5,592	

=== Deanery of Repps ===
Benefice	Churches	Link	Clergy	Population served	Ref
Aylmerton (St John the Baptist), Runton, Beeston Regis, Gresham	St John the Baptist, Aylmerton; All Saints, Beeston Regis; All Saints, Gresham; Holy Trinity, Runton; St Andrew, East Runton		Rector: David Head; NSM: Ruth Adamson	3,531	
Cromer (St Peter and St Paul)	SS Peter & Paul, Cromer; St Martin, Suffield Park		Vicar: James Porter; OLM: Jennifer Hodgkinson	7,354	
Poppyland, Comprising Antingham, Northrepps, Overstrand, Sidestrand, Southrepps, Thorpe Market, and Trimingham	St Mary, Antingham; St Mary, Northrepps; St Martin, Overstrand; St Michael, Sidestrand; St James, Southrepps; St Margaret, Thorpe Market; St John the Baptist's Head, Trimingham		Vicar: David Roper	4,243	
Roughton (St Mary) and Felbrigg, Metton, Sustead, Bessingham and Gunton with Hanworth	St Mary, Roughton; St Mary, Bessingham; St Margaret, Felbrigg; St Bartholomew, Hanworth; St Andrew, Metton; SS Peter & Paul, Sustead		Rector: Janet Frymann	1,540	
Sheringham (St Peter)	St Peter, Sheringham		Vicar: Christian Heycocks	7,365	
Trunch Group, the (St Botolph), Comprising Gimingham, Knapton, Mundesley, Paston, and Trunch with Swafield and Bradfield	All Saints, Gimingham; St Peter, Knapton; St Botolph, Trunch; All Saints, Mundesley; St Margaret, Paston; St Giles, Bradfield; St Nicholas, Swafield		Rector: Andrew Jones	5,066	

== Dedications ==
This table is drawn from the above lists. More than half of the churches in the diocese have just four dedications: St Mary, St Andrew, All Saints and St Peter.

Saint(s)	No.
St Agnes	1
St Alban	1
All Saints	106
St Andrew	66
St Andrew & All Saints	2
SS Andrew & Mary	2
SS Andrew & Peter	2
St Anne	1
Assumption of Mary	5
St Barnabas	1
St Bartholomew	4
St Benedict	2
St Botolph	8
St Catherine	3
Christ Church	4
St Clement	1
Holy Cross	2
St Cuthbert	2
St David	1
St Edmund (King & Martyr)	13
St Elizabeth	1
St Ethelbert	4
SS Fabian & Sebastian	1
St Faith	1
Fountain of Life	1
St Francis	1
St George	8
SS Gervase & Protase	1
St Giles	4
Good Shepherd	1
Grace Church	1
St Helen	4
St Helen & All Saints	1
Holy Innocents	1
St James	3
St John the Baptist	13
St John the Baptist's Head	1
St John the Baptist & All Saints	1
St John the Evangelist	5
SS John & Mary	1
St Julian	1
St Lawrence	6
St Leonard	2
St Luke	2
St Margaret	37
St Margaret & All Saints	1
St Mark	2
St Martin	8
St Mary Magdalene	7
St Mary the Virgin	122
St Mary & All Saints	2
St Mary & Holy Cross	1
SS Mary & Botolph	1
SS Mary & Margaret	4
SS Mary & Thomas Becket	1
SS Mary & Walstan	1
St Matthew	1
St Matthias	1
St Maurice	1
St Michael (& All Angels)	26
St Nicholas	19
SS Nicholas, Mary & Thomas	1
St Paul	5
St Peter	49
SS Peter & John	1
SS Peter & Paul	26
St Remigius	3
St Stephen	1
St Swithin	3
St Thomas	2
Holy Trinity	11
Holy Trinity & All Saints	1
St Withburga	1
No dedication	5

== See also ==
- Norwich Cathedral
- Diocese of East Anglia, of the Catholic Church
