= Charles Lisle Carr =

Anglican clergyman (1871–1942)

Carr in 1922

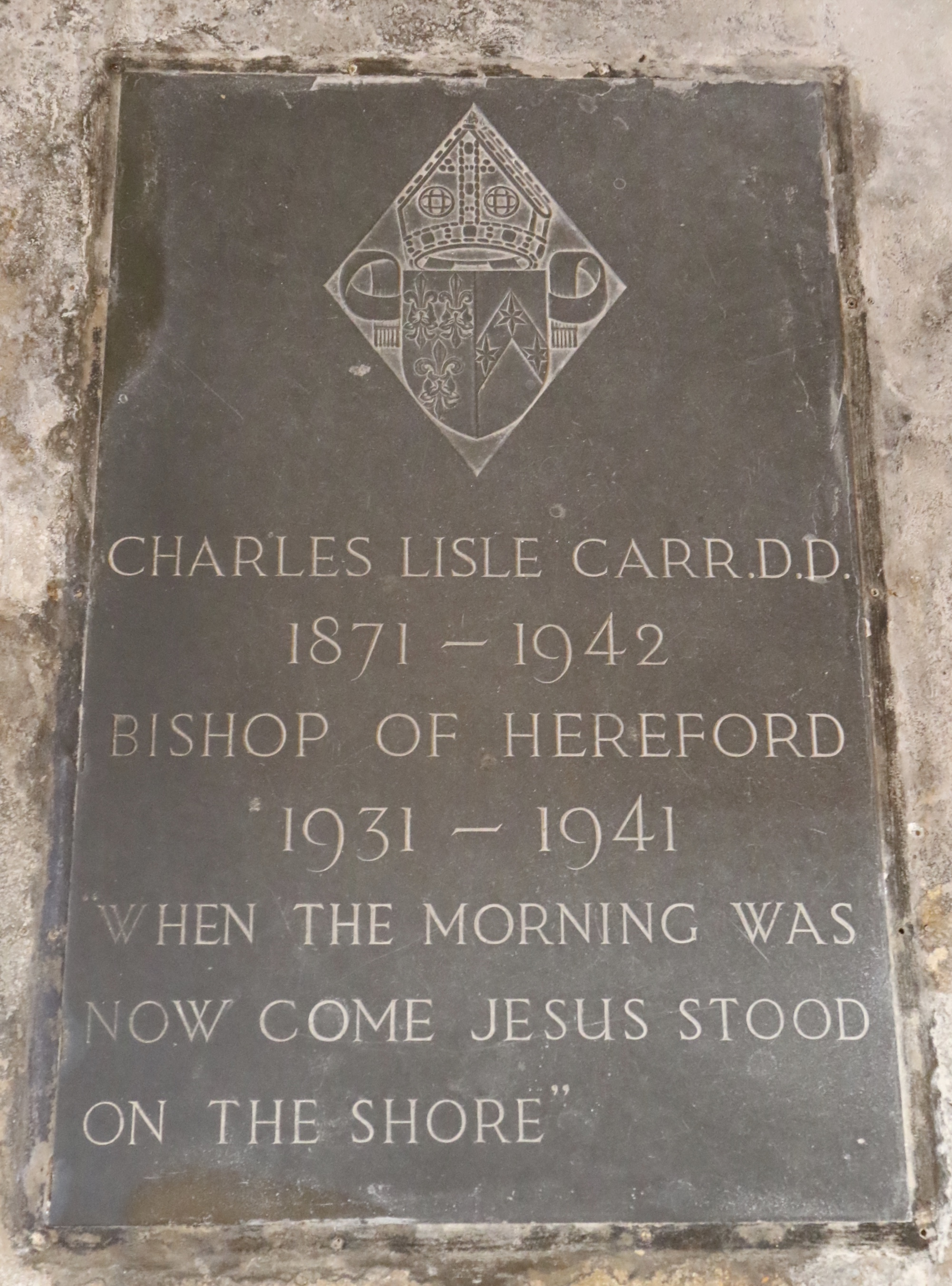
Memorial in Hereford Cathedral

Charles Lisle Carr (26 September 1871 – 20 May 1942) was an Anglican clergyman who served as the second bishop of the restored see of Coventry in the modern era and the 107th Bishop of Hereford in a long line stretching back to the 7th century.

== Early life ==
Carr was born in Alnwick, Northumberland, the younger son of Robert Carr. He was educated at Liverpool College and St Catharine's College, Cambridge, to which college he was elected a Fellow in 1934. After university he took Holy Orders at Ridley Hall, Cambridge and embarked on a varied clerical career that took him to many urban locations.

== Ecclesiastical career ==
Carr was curate of Aston-juxta-Birmingham, 1894–97; Redditch, 1897; Tutor of Ridley Hall, Cambridge, 1897–1902; Vicar of St Sepulchre, Cambridge, 1901–02; Vicar of St. Nicholas, Blundellsands, Liverpool, 1902–06; Rector of Woolton, Liverpool, 1906–12; Vicar of Yarmouth 1912–20; Archdeacon of Norfolk, 1916–18; Archdeacon of Norwich, 1918–20; Vicar of Sheffield, 1920–22; Honorary Canon of Sheffield Cathedral, 1920; Archdeacon of Sheffield, 1920–22; Bishop of Coventry, 1922–31; Bishop of Hereford, 1931–41.

== Family ==
Carr was married, at the Holy Sepulchre church, Cambridge, on 1 July 1902, to Isabel Wortley Drury, daughter of Thomas Drury, the principal of Ridley Hall. They had one son. Carr retired in 1941, dying the following February. His wife survived him by 22 years.

Carr was an active Freemason in the City of Coventry.

== Notes ==
Church of England titles
Preceded by Sidney Pelham	Archdeacon of Norfolk; 1916–1918	Succeeded by George Martius MacDermott
Preceded by Frederick Brooke Westcott	Archdeacon of Norwich; 1918–1920	Succeeded by George Martius MacDermott
Preceded by Herbert Gresford Jones	Archdeacon of Sheffield; 1920–1922	Succeeded by John Russell Darbyshire
Preceded by Huyshe Wolcott Yeatman-Biggs	Bishop of Coventry; 1922–1931	Succeeded by Mervyn George Haigh
Preceded by Martin Linton Smith	Bishop of Hereford; 1931–1942	Succeeded by Richard Godfrey Parsons
