= Archdeacon of Norwich =

Church of England ecclesiastical office

The Archdeacon of Norwich is a senior ecclesiastical officer in the Church of England Diocese of Norwich, who exercises supervision of clergy and responsibility for church buildings within the geographical area of her or his archdeaconry.

== History ==
The ancient Archdeaconry of Norwich has been an ecclesiastical jurisdiction within the Diocese of Norwich since its creation around 1100 (925 years ago) – at which time the first archdeacons were being appointed across the nation.

== List of archdeacons ==
=== High Medieval ===
Diocesan archdeacons:

Four archdeacons occur in records but cannot be clearly identified with a particular territory:

- bef. 1086–aft. 1107: Geoffrey
- bef. 1107–aft. 1114: Alfred
- bef. 1101–aft. 1115: Osbern
- bef. 1111–aft. 1115: Walter

Archdeacons of Norwich:

- bef. 1127–aft. 1148: William (I)
- aft. 1146: Ralph
- bef. 1161–aft. 1164: Philip
- bef. 1168–aft. 1178: William (II)
- bef. 1182–aft. 1198: Thomas
- 1200–1225 (res.): Geoffrey de Burgh
- 1228–1229 (res.): Luke the chaplain (became Archbishop of Dublin)
- 1229–aft. 1238: John of Ferentino
- bef. 1248–aft. 1252: William de Suffield
- c. 1253 & c. 1255: post not vacant
- bef. 1273–aft. 1289 (res.): Thomas de Skerning (became Archdeacon of Suffolk)

=== Late Medieval ===
- 4 February 1302 – 1324 (res.): William de Knapton (became Archdeacon of Suffolk)
- 16 April 1324–bef. 1328 (res.): Roger de Snetisham
- 8 December 1328 – 1340 (res.): William Bateman
- 1340–1347 (res.): Thomas Fastolf
- January 1347–bef. 1349: Hamo de Belers
- February 1347–bef. May 1347 (rev.): Thomas de Bradwardine (ineffective royal grant)
- May 1347–?: John Berenger (ineffective royal grant)
- 27 August 1349 – 1355 (d.): Richard Lyng
- 9 April 1355–bef. 1361 (d.): Richard de Norwico
- 17 October 1361 – 27 March 1387 (exch.): William Swynflet
- 27 March 1387–aft. 1801: John Derlyngton
- 17 November 1395: John de Middleton (ineffective royal grant)
- November 1406–bef. November 1407 (res.): Robert Wolveden
- 12 November 1407–bef. 1419 (d.): William Westacre
- 11 April 1419 – 1426 (d.): Henry Kays
- bef. 1428–aft. 1455: Richard Cawdray
- bef. 1465–1459 (res.): John Hales
- bef. 1461–bef. 1462 (res.): John Morton
- bef. 1463–aft. 1463: Vincent Clement
- bef. 1472–3 January 1477 (exch.): John Morton (again; also Archdeacon of Winchester from 1475 and of Berks from 1476)
- 3 January 1477–aft. 1483: Thomas Marke
- bef. 1484–1497 (res.): Nicholas Goldwell (became Archdeacon of Suffolk)
- 20 April 1497–bef. 1509 (res.): Robert Honywood
- 14 June 1509–bef. 1517 (d.): John Ednam
- 5 February 1517 – 1522 (res.): William Stillington (became Archdeacon of Norfolk)
- 9 April 1522–bef. 1528 (res.): Thomas Larke
- 26 June 1528–July 1543 (d.): George Wyndham
- 25 November 1543–bef. 1557 (d.): Thomas Cornwalleys

=== Early modern ===
- 16 October 1557–bef. 1571 (d.): Richard Underwood
- 15 February 1572 – 1576 (d.): Thomas Roberts (bishop's grant)
- bef. 1572 (disp.): John Rugge (ineffective bishop's grant)
- 1 August 1573 (disp.): George Gardiner (disputed queen's grant; Dean of Norwich from November 1573)
- 9 August 1581 – 4 September 1604 (d.): John Freake
- 12 September 1604–bef. 1618 (d.): Thomas Jegon
- 13 April 1618–bef. 1652 (d.): Andrew Bing
- 18 October 1660 – 31 March 1668 (d.): William Gery
- 20 April 1668–?: John Reynolds
- 8 June 1676 – 12 March 1694 (d.): John Conant
- 19 April 1694 – 1 April 1720 (d.): John Jeffery
- 5 May 1720–bef. 1722 (res.): William Trimnel (became Dean of Winchester)
- 22 February 1722 – 19 May 1742 (d.): Christopher Clarke
- 13 July 1742–bef. 1744 (res.): Matthew Postlethwayte
- 11 October 1744 – 13 June 1782 (d.): John Berney
- 15 June 1782–bef. 1814 (res.): William Yonge
- 22 November 1814 – 10 September 1844 (d.): Henry Bathurst
- 23 September 1844 – 29 March 1857 (d.): John Collyer
- 1 July 1857 – 27 March 1868 (d.): Robert Hankinson

=== Late modern ===
- 1868–7 January 1878 (d.): Augustus Hopper
- 1878–1910: Thomas Perowne (died 1913)
- 1910–24 February 1918 (d.): Frederick Westcott
- 1918–1920 (res.): Charles Lisle Carr (became Archdeacon of Sheffield)
- 1920–1938: George MacDermott
- 1937–1954: Thomas Perowne (died 1954) (son of the above)
- 1954–1961 (ret.): Robert Meiklejohn (afterwards archdeacon emeritus)
- 1961–1973 (res.): Aubrey Aitken (became Bishop–Archdeacon of Lynn)
- 1973–1981 (res.): Timothy Dudley-Smith (became Bishop of Thetford)
- 1981–1993 (res.): Michael Handley (became Archdeacon of Norfolk)
- 1994–2008 (ret.): Clifford Offer
- 2009–29 June 2016 (res.) Jan McFarlane (became Bishop of Repton)
- 13 November 2016 – 1 April 2022 (res.): Karen Hutchinson
- 1 October 2022 – present: Keith James

== Sources ==
- Greenaway, Diana E. (1971), Fasti Ecclesiae Anglicanae 1066–1300, vol. 2, pp. 62–64
- Jones, B. (1963), Fasti Ecclesiae Anglicanae 1300–1541, vol. 4, pp. 26–28
- Horn, Joyce M. (1992), Fasti Ecclesiae Anglicanae 1541–1857, vol. 7, pp. 44–46
