= Edward Reynolds (disambiguation) =

Edward Reynolds was a bishop and author.

Edward Reynolds may also refer to:

- Edward Reynolds (MP), MP for Weymouth and Melcombe Regis
- Edward Reynolds (cricketer) (1830–1908), English clergyman, schoolmaster and cricketer
- Edward Reynolds (American politician) (1856–1938), Maine politician
- Edward Reynolds (Australian politician) (1892–1971), Australian politician
- Edward Reynolds (priest), son of the bishop
- Ed Reynolds (linebacker) (born 1961), former American football linebacker
- Ed Reynolds (safety) (born 1991), American football safety
- Ed Reynolds (scholar) (born 1942), first black full-time graduate of Wake Forest University, and professor of history
- Eddie Reynolds (c. 1935–1993), Irish footballer
- Tige Reynolds (Edward Samuel Reynolds, 1877–1931), American cartoonist
