= Anglo-Saxon paganism =

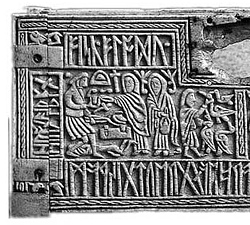
The right half of the front panel of the 7th-century Franks Casket, depicting the Anglo-Saxon (and wider Germanic) legend of Wayland the Smith

Anglo-Saxon paganism, sometimes termed Anglo-Saxon heathenism, Anglo-Saxon pre-Christian religion, Anglo-Saxon traditional religion, or Anglo-Saxon polytheism, is the set of religious beliefs and practices followed by the Anglo-Saxons between the 5th and 8th centuries AD, during the initial period of Early Medieval England. A variant of Germanic paganism found across much of north-western Europe, it encompassed a heterogeneous variety of beliefs and cultic practices, with much regional variation.

Developing from the earlier Iron Age religion of continental northern Europe, it was introduced to Britain following the Anglo-Saxon migration in the mid 5th century, and remained the dominant belief system in England until the Christianisation of its kingdoms between the 7th and 8th centuries, with some aspects gradually blending into folklore. The pejorative terms paganism and heathenism were first applied to this religion by Christianised Anglo-Saxons, and it does not appear that the followers of the indigenous faith had a name for their religion themselves; there has therefore been debate among contemporary scholars as to the appropriateness of continuing to describe these belief systems using this Christian terminology. Contemporary knowledge of Anglo-Saxon paganism derives largely from three sources: textual evidence produced by Christian Anglo-Saxons like Bede and Aldhelm, place-name evidence, and archaeological evidence of cultic practices. Further suggestions regarding the nature of Anglo-Saxon paganism have been developed through comparisons with the better-attested pre-Christian belief systems of neighbouring peoples such as the Norse.

Anglo-Saxon paganism was a polytheistic belief system, focused around a belief in deities known as the ése (singular ós). The most prominent of these deities was probably Woden; other prominent gods included Thunor and Tiw. There was also a belief in a variety of other supernatural entities which inhabited the landscape, including elves, nicors, and dragons. Cultic practice largely revolved around demonstrations of devotion, including sacrifice of inanimate objects and animals to these deities, particularly at certain religious festivals during the year. There is some evidence for the existence of timber temples, although other cultic spaces might have been open-air, and would have included cultic trees and megaliths. Little is known about pagan conceptions of an afterlife, although such beliefs likely influenced funerary practices, in which the dead were either interred or cremated, typically with a selection of grave goods. The belief system also likely included ideas about magic and witchcraft, and elements that could be classified as a form of shamanism.

The deities of this religion provided the basis for the names of the days of the week in the English language. What is known about the religion and its accompanying mythology have since influenced both literature and modern paganism.

== Definition ==
A political map of Britain c. 650 (the names are in modern English)

The word pagan is a Latin pejorative term that was used by Gentile Christianity (also: Pagan Christianity) in Anglo-Saxon England to designate non-Christians. In Old English, the vernacular language of Anglo-Saxon England, the equivalent term was hæðen ("heathen"), a word that was cognate to the Old Norse heiðinn, both of which may derive from a Gothic word, haiþno. Both pagan and heathen were terms that carried pejorative overtones, with hæðen also being used in Late Anglo-Saxon texts to refer to criminals and others deemed to have not behaved according to Christian teachings. The term "paganism" was one used by Gentile Christians as a form of othering, and as the archaeologist Neil Price put it, in the Anglo-Saxon context, "paganism" is "largely an empty concept defined by what it is not (Christianity)".

There is no evidence that anyone living in Anglo-Saxon England ever described themselves as a "pagan" or understood there to be a singular religion, "paganism", that stood as a monolithic alternative to Christianity. These pagan belief systems would have been inseparable from other aspects of daily life. According to the archaeologists Martin Carver, Alex Sanmark, and Sarah Semple, Anglo-Saxon paganism was "not a religion with supraregional rules and institutions but a loose term for a variety of local intellectual world views." Carver stressed that, in Anglo-Saxon England, neither paganism nor Christianity represented "homogenous intellectual positions or canons and practice"; instead, there was "considerable interdigitation" between the two. As a phenomenon, this belief system lacked any apparent rules or consistency, and exhibited both regional and chronological variation. The archaeologist Aleks Pluskowski suggested that it is possible to talk of "multiple Anglo-Saxon 'paganisms'".

Adopting the terminology of the sociologist of religion Max Weber, the historian Marilyn Dunn described Anglo-Saxon paganism as a "world accepting" religion, one which was "concerned with the here and now" and in particular with issues surrounding the safety of the family, prosperity, and the avoidance of drought or famine. Also adopting the categories of Gustav Mensching, she described Anglo-Saxon paganism as a "folk religion", in that its adherents concentrated on survival and prosperity in this world.

Using the expressions "paganism" or "heathenism" when discussing pre-Christian belief systems in Anglo-Saxon England is problematic. Historically, many early scholars of the Anglo-Saxon period used these terms to describe the religious beliefs in England before its conversion to Christianity in the 7th century. Several later scholars criticised this approach; as the historian Ian N. Wood stated, using the term "pagan" when discussing the Anglo-Saxons forces the scholar to adopt "the cultural constructs and value judgements of the early medieval [Christian] missionaries" and thus obscures scholarly understandings of the so-called pagans' own perspectives. At present, while some Anglo-Saxonists have ceased using the terms "paganism" or "pagan" when discussing the early Anglo-Saxon period, others have continued to do so, viewing these terms as a useful means of designating something that is not Christian yet which is still identifiably religious. The historian John Hines proposed "traditional religion" as a better alternative, although Carver cautioned against this, noting that Britain in the 5th to the 8th century was replete with new ideas and thus belief systems of that period were not particularly "traditional". The term "pre-Christian" religion has also been used; this avoids the judgemental connotations of "paganism" and "heathenism" but is not always chronologically accurate.

== Evidence ==
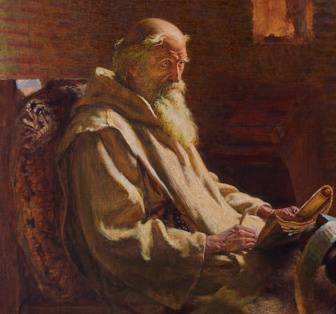
An early 20th-century depiction of Bede, who provides much of the textual information on Anglo-Saxon paganism. Painting by James Doyle Penrose.

Surviving primary textual source material derives from later authors, such as Bede and the anonymous author of the Life of St Wilfrid, who wrote in Latin rather than in Old English. These writers were not interested in providing a full portrait of the Anglo-Saxons' pre-Christian belief systems, and thus our textual portrayal of these religious beliefs is fragmentary and incidental. Also perhaps useful are the writings of those Christian Anglo-Saxon missionaries who were active in converting the pagan societies of continental Europe, namely Willibrord and Boniface, as well as the writings of the 1st century AD Roman writer Tacitus, who commented upon the pagan religions of the Anglo-Saxons' ancestors in continental Europe. The historian Frank Stenton commented that the available texts only provide us with "a dim impression" of pagan religion in Anglo-Saxon England, while similarly, the archaeologist David Wilson commented that written sources "should be treated with caution and viewed as suggestive rather than in any way definitive".

Far fewer textual records discuss Anglo-Saxon paganism than the pre-Christian belief systems found in nearby Ireland, Francia, or Scandinavia. There is no neat, formalised account of Anglo-Saxon pagan beliefs as there is for instance for Classical mythology and Norse mythology. Although many scholars have used Norse mythology as a guide to understanding the beliefs of pre-Christian Anglo-Saxon England, caution has been expressed as to the utility of this approach. Stenton assumes that the connection between Anglo-Saxon and Scandinavian paganism occurred "in a past which was already remote" at the time of the Anglo-Saxon migration to Britain, and claims that there was clear diversity among the pre-Christian belief systems of Scandinavia itself, further complicating the use of Scandinavian material to understand that of England. Conversely, the historian Brian Branston argued for the use of Old Norse sources to better understand Anglo-Saxon pagan beliefs, recognising mythological commonalities between the two rooted in their common ancestry.

Old English place-names also provide some insight into the pre-Christian beliefs and practices of Anglo-Saxon England. Some of these place-names reference the names of particular deities, while others use terms that refer to cultic practices that took place there. In England, these two categories remain separate, unlike in Scandinavia, where certain place-names exhibit both features. Those place-names which carry possible pagan associations are centred primarily in the centre and south-east of England, while no obvious examples are known from Northumbria or East Anglia. It is not clear why such names are rarer or non-existent in certain parts of the country; it may be due to changes in nomenclature brought about by Scandinavian settlement in the Late Anglo-Saxon period or because of evangelising efforts by later Christian authorities. In 1941, Stenton suggested that "between fifty and sixty sites of heathen worship" could be identified through the place-name evidence, although in 1961 the place-name scholar Margaret Gelling cautioned that only forty-five of these appeared reliable. The literature specialist Philip A. Shaw has however warned that many of these sites might not have been named by pagans but by later Christian Anglo-Saxons, reflecting spaces that were perceived to be heathen from a Christian perspective.

"Although our understanding of Anglo-Saxon pre-Christian religion from written sources and from place names is partial and far from complete, archaeology is beginning to reveal more."

— Archaeologist Martin Welch, 2011.

According to Wilson, the archaeological evidence is "prolific and hence is potentially the most useful in the study of paganism" in Anglo-Saxon England. Archaeologically, the realms of religion, ritual, and magic can only be identified if they affected material culture. As such, scholarly understandings of pre-Christian religion in Anglo-Saxon England are reliant largely on rich burials and monumental buildings, which exert as much of a political purpose as a religious one. Metalwork items discovered by metal detectorists have also contributed to the interpretation of Anglo-Saxon paganism. The world-views of the pre-Christian Anglo-Saxons would have impinged on all aspects of everyday life, making it particularly difficult for modern scholars to separate Anglo-Saxon ritual activities as something distinct from other areas of daily life. Much of this archaeological material comes from the period in which pagan beliefs were being supplanted by Christianity, and thus an understanding of Anglo-Saxon paganism must be seen in tandem with the archaeology of the conversion.

Based on the evidence available, the historian John Blair stated that the pre-Christian religion of Anglo-Saxon England largely resembled "that of the pagan Britons under Roman rule... at least in its outward forms". However, the archaeologist Audrey Meaney concluded that there exists "very little undoubted evidence for Anglo-Saxon paganism, and we remain ignorant of many of its essential features of organisation and philosophy". Similarly, the Old English specialist Roy Page stated that the surviving evidence was "too sparse and too scattered" to permit a good understanding of Anglo-Saxon paganism.

== Historical development ==
=== Arrival and establishment ===
During most of the fourth century, the majority of Britain had been part of the Roman Empire, which—starting in 380 AD with the Edict of Thessalonica—had Christianity as its official religion. However, in Britain, Christianity was probably still a minority religion, restricted largely to the urban centres and their hinterlands. While it did have some impact in the countryside, here it appears that indigenous Late Iron Age polytheistic belief systems continued to be widely practised. Some areas, such as the Welsh Marches, the majority of Wales (excepting Gwent), Lancashire, and the south-western peninsula, are totally lacking evidence for Christianity in this period.

Britons who found themselves in the areas now dominated by Anglo-Saxon elites possibly embraced the Anglo-Saxons' pagan religion in order to aid their own self-advancement, just as they adopted other trappings of Anglo-Saxon culture. This would have been easier for those Britons who, rather than being Christian, continued to practise indigenous polytheistic belief systems, and in areas this Late Iron Age polytheism could have syncretically mixed with the incoming Anglo-Saxon religion. Conversely, there is weak possible evidence for limited survival of Roman Christianity into the Anglo-Saxon period, such as the place-name ecclēs, meaning 'church', at two locations in Norfolk and Eccles in Kent. However, Blair suggested that Roman Christianity would not have experienced more than a "ghost-life" in Anglo-Saxon areas. Those Britons who continued to practise Christianity were probably perceived as second-class citizens and were unlikely to have had much of an impact on the pagan kings and aristocracy which was then emphasising Anglo-Saxon culture and defining itself against British culture. If the British Christians were able to convert any of the Anglo-Saxon elite conquerors, it was likely only on a small community scale, with British Christianity having little impact on the later establishment of Anglo-Saxon Christianity in the seventh century.

Prior scholarship tended to view Anglo-Saxon paganism as a development from an older Germanic paganism. The scholar Michael Bintley cautioned against this approach, noting that this "'Germanic' paganism" had "never had a single ur-form" from which later variants developed.

=== The Christianisation of Anglo-Saxons ===
Anglo-Saxon paganism only existed for a relatively short time-span, from the fifth to the eighth centuries. Our knowledge of the Christianisation process derives from Christian textual sources. Both Latin and ogham inscriptions and the Ruin of Britain by Gildas suggest that the leading families of Dumnonia and other Brittonic kingdoms had already adopted Christianity in the 6th century. In 596, Pope Gregory I ordered a Gregorian mission to be launched in order to convert the Anglo-Saxons to the Roman Catholic Church. The leader of this mission, Augustine, probably landed in Thanet, then part of the Kingdom of Kent, in the summer of 597. While Christianity was initially restricted to Kent, it saw "major and sustained expansion" in the period from c. 625 to 642, when the Kentish king Eadbald sponsored a mission to the Northumbrians led by Paulinus, the Northumbrian king Oswald invited a Christian mission from Irish monks to establish themselves, and the courts of the East Anglians and the Gewisse were converted by continental missionaries Felix the Burgundian and Birinus the Italian. The next phase of the conversion took place between c. 653 and 664, and entailed the Northumbrian sponsored conversion of the rulers of the East Saxons, Middle Anglians, and Mercians. In the final phase of the conversion, which took place during the 670s and 680s, the final two Anglo-Saxon kingdoms to be led by pagan rulers—in Sussex and the Isle of Wight—saw their leaders baptised.

As with other areas of Europe, the conversion to Christianity was facilitated by the aristocracy. These rulers may have felt themselves to be members of a pagan backwater in contrast to the Christian kingdoms in continental Europe. The pace of Christian conversion varied across Anglo-Saxon England, with it taking almost 90 years for the official conversion to succeed. Most of the Anglo-Saxon kingdoms returned to paganism for a time after the death of their first converted king. However, by the end of the 680s, all of the Anglo-Saxon peoples were at least nominally Christian. Blair noted that for most Anglo-Saxons, the "moral and practical imperatives" of following one's lord by converting to Christianity were a "powerful stimulus".

It remains difficult to determine the extent to which pre-Christian beliefs retained their popularity among the Anglo-Saxon populace from the seventh century onward. Theodore's Penitential and the Laws of Wihtred of Kent issued in 695 imposed penalties on those who provided offerings to "demons". However, by two or three decades later, Bede could write as if paganism had died out in Anglo-Saxon England. Condemnations of pagan cults also do not appear in other canons from this later period, again suggesting that ecclesiastical figures no longer considered persisting paganism to be a problem.

=== Scandinavian incursions ===
In the latter decades of the ninth century during the Late Anglo-Saxon period, Scandinavian settlers arrived in Britain, bringing with them their own, kindred pre-Christian beliefs. No cultic sites used by Scandinavian pagans have been archaeologically identified, although place names suggest some possible examples. For instance, Roseberry Topping in North Yorkshire was known as Othensberg in the twelfth century, a name which derived from the Old Norse Óðinsberg, or 'Hill of Óðin'. A number of place-names also contain Old Norse references to mythological entities, such as alfr, skratii, and troll. A number of pendants representing Mjolnir, the hammer of the god Thor, have also been found in England, reflecting the probability that he was worshipped among the Anglo-Scandinavian population. Jesch argued that, given that there was only evidence for the worship of Odin and Thor in Anglo-Scandinavian England, these might have been the only deities to have been actively venerated by the Scandinavian settlers, even if they were aware of the mythological stories surrounding other Norse gods and goddesses. North however argued that one passage in the Old English rune poem, written in the eighth or ninth century, may reflect knowledge of the Scandinavian god Týr.

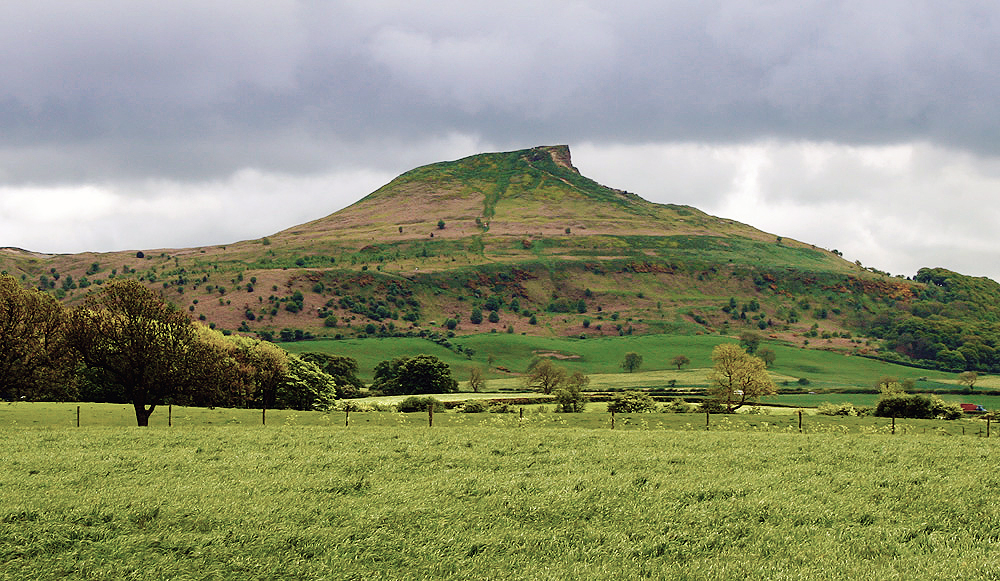
Roseberry Topping in North Yorkshire, once known as the 'Hill of Óðin'

Archaeologically, the introduction of Norse paganism to Britain in this period is mostly visited in the mortuary evidence. A number of Scandinavian furnished burial styles were also introduced that differed from the Christian churchyard burials then dominant in Late Anglo-Saxon England. However, whether these represent clear pagan identity or not is a source of debate among archaeologists. Norse mythological scenes have also been identified on a number of stone carvings from the period, such as the Gosforth Cross, which included images of Ragnarök.

The English church found that it needed to conduct a new conversion process to Christianize the incoming Scandinavian population. It is not well understood how the Christian institutions converted these settlers, in part due to a lack of textual descriptions of this conversion process equivalent to Bede's description of the earlier Anglo-Saxon conversion. However, it appears that the Scandinavian migrants had converted to Christianity within the first few decades of their arrival.

The historian Judith Jesch suggested that these beliefs survived throughout Late Anglo-Saxon England not in the form of an active non-Christian religion, but as "cultural paganism", the acceptance of references to pre-Christian myths in particular cultural contexts within an officially Christian society. Such "cultural paganism" could represent a reference to the cultural heritage of the Scandinavian population rather than their religious heritage. For instance, many Norse mythological themes and motifs are present in the poetry composed for the court of Cnut the Great, an eleventh-century Anglo-Scandinavian king who had been baptised into Christianity and who otherwise emphasised his identity as a Christian monarch.

=== Post-conversion folklore ===
"The pagan hierarchical structure disintegrated rapidly in the seventh century in the face of Christianity's systematic organization. But folk practices were all-pervasive in everyday life. The animistic character of Germanic belief prior to Christianization, with its emphasis on nature, holistic cures, and worship at wells, trees, and stones, meant that it was hard to counteract on an institutional level of organized religion... The synthesis of Christian and Germanic ideas gradually transformed these practices, undoubtedly at the local level... In this way Christianity ultimately penetrated the homes and daily lives of the various Germanic peoples in the centuries after the arrival of the first missionaries."

— Historian Karen Louise Jolly, 1996.

Although Christianity had been adopted across Anglo-Saxon England by the late seventh century, many pre-Christian customs continued to be practised. Bintley argued that aspects of Anglo-Saxon paganism served as the foundations for parts of Anglo-Saxon Christianity. Pre-Christian beliefs affected the folklore of the Anglo-Saxon period, and through this continued to exert an influence on popular religion within the late Anglo-Saxon period. The conversion did not result in the obliteration of pre-Christian traditions, but in various ways created a synthesis of traditions, as exhibited for instance by the Franks Casket, an artwork depicting both the pre-Christian story of Weland the Smith and the Christian story of the Adoration of the Magi. Blair noted that even in the late eleventh century, "important aspects of lay Christianity were still influenced by traditional indigenous practices".

Both secular and church authorities issued condemnations of alleged non-Christian pagan practices, such as the veneration of wells, trees, and stones, right through to the eleventh century and into the High Middle Ages. However, most of the penitentials condemning such practices—notably that attributed to Ecgbert of York—were largely produced around the year 1000, which may suggest that their prohibitions against non-Christian cultic behaviour may be a response to Norse pagan beliefs brought in by Scandinavian settlers rather than a reference to older Anglo-Saxon practices. Various scholars, among them historical geographer Della Hooke and Price, have contrastingly believed that these reflected the continuing practice of veneration at wells and trees at a popular level long after the official Christianisation of Anglo-Saxon society.

Various elements of English folklore from the Medieval period onwards have been interpreted as being survivals from Anglo-Saxon paganism. For instance, writing in the 1720s, Henry Bourne stated his belief that the winter custom of the Yule log was a leftover from Anglo-Saxon paganism, however this is an idea that has been disputed by some subsequent research by the likes of historian Ronald Hutton, who believe that it was only introduced into England in the seventeenth century by immigrants arriving from Flanders. The Abbots Bromley Horn Dance, which is performed annually in the village of Abbots Bromley in Staffordshire, has also been claimed, by some, to be a remnant of Anglo-Saxon paganism. The antlers used in the dance belonged to reindeer and have been carbon dated to the eleventh century, and it is therefore believed that they originated in Norway and were brought to England some time in the late Mediaeval period, as by that time reindeer were extinct in Britain.

== Mythology ==
=== Cosmology ===
Little is known about the cosmological beliefs of Anglo-Saxon paganism. Carver, Sanmark, and Semple suggested that every community within Anglo-Saxon England likely had "its own take on cosmology", although they suggested that there might have been "an underlying system" that was widely shared. The later Anglo-Saxon Nine Herbs Charm mentions seven worlds, which may be a reference to an earlier pagan cosmological belief. Similarly, Bede claimed that the Christian king Oswald of Northumbria defeated a pagan rival at a sacred plain or meadow called Heavenfield (Hefenfelth), which may be a reference to a pagan belief in a heavenly plain. The Anglo-Saxon concept corresponding to fate was wyrd, although the "pagan" nature of this conception is subject to some debate; Dorothy Whitelock suggested that it was a belief held only after Christianisation, while Branston maintained that wyrd had been an important concept for the pagan Anglo-Saxons. He suggested that it was cognate to the Icelandic term Urdr and thus was connected to the concept of three sisters, the Nornir, who oversee fate in recorded Norse mythology. It is possible that the pre-Christian Anglo-Saxons held a belief in an apocalypse that bore similarities with the later Norse myth of Ragnarok.

Although no evidence so far directly testifies to the existence of such a belief, the possibility that the pre-Christian Anglo-Saxons believed in a cosmological world tree has also been considered. It has been suggested that the idea of a world tree can be discerned through certain references in the Dream of the Rood poem. This idea may be bolstered if it is the case, as some scholars have argued, that their concept of a world tree may be derived from a purported common Indo-European root. The historian Clive Tolley has cautioned that any Anglo-Saxon world tree would likely not be directly comparable to that referenced in Norse textual sources.

=== Deities ===
"The world of the Anglo-Saxon gods will forever remain a mystery to us, existing just beyond the reach of written history. This pagan world sits in an enigmatic realm that is in many respects prehistoric, an alien headspace far removed from our own intellectual universe. Situated within a polytheistic cosmos, clouded from us by centuries of Christian theology and Enlightenment rationalism, we can discern the existence of a handful of potential deities, who though long deceased have perhaps left their mark in place-names, royal genealogies, and the accounts of proselytizing monks. Such sources have led scholars to put together a pantheon for early medieval England, populated by such murky figures as Woden, Þunor, Tiw, and Frig."

— Historian Ethan Doyle White, 2014

Anglo-Saxon paganism was a polytheistic belief system, with its practitioners believing in many deities. However, most Christian Anglo-Saxon writers had little or no interest in the pagan gods, and thus did not discuss them in their texts. The Old English words for a god were ēs and ōs, and they may be reflected in such place-names as Easole ("God's Ridge") in Kent and Eisey ("God's Island") in Wiltshire.

The deity for whom the most evidence exists is Woden, as "traces of his cult are scattered more widely over the rolling English countryside than those of any other heathen deity". Place names containing Wodnes- or Wednes- as their first element have been interpreted as references to Woden, and as a result his name is often seen as the basis for such place names as Woodnesborough ("Woden's Barrow") in Kent, Wansdyke ("Woden's Dyke") in Wiltshire, and Wensley ("Woden's Woodland Clearing" or "Woden's Wood") in Derbyshire. The name Woden also appears as an ancestor of the royal genealogies of Kent, Wessex, East Anglia and Mercia, resulting in suggestions that after losing his status as a god during the Christianisation process he was euhemerised as a royal ancestor. Woden also appears as the leader of the Wild Hunt, and he is referred to as a magical healer in the Nine Herbs Charm, directly paralleling the role of his continental German counterpart Wodan in the Merseburg Incantations. He is also often interpreted as being cognate with the Norse god Óðinn and the Old High German Uuodan. Additionally, he appears in the Old English ancestor of Wednesday, Ƿōdenesdæġ ( a calque from its Latin equivalent, as are the rest of the days of the week).

It has been suggested that Woden was also known as Grim—a name which appears in such English place-names as Grimspound in Dartmoor, Grimes Graves in Norfolk and Grimsby ("Grim's Village") in Lincolnshire—because in recorded Norse mythology, the god Óðinn is also known as Grímnir. Highlighting that there are around twice as many Grim place-names in England as Woden place-names, the place-name scholar Margaret Gelling cautioned against the view that Grim was always associated with Woden in Anglo-Saxon England.

The second-most-widespread deity in Anglo-Saxon England appears to be the god Thunor. It has been suggested that the hammer and the swastika were the god's symbols, representing thunderbolts, and both of these symbols have been found in Anglo-Saxon graves, the latter being common on cremation urns. A large number of Thunor place-names feature the Old English word lēah ("wood", or "clearing in a wood"), among them Thunderley and Thundersley in Essex. The deity's name also appears in other compounds too, as with Thunderfield ("Thunor's Open Land") in Surrey and Thunores hlaew ("Thunor's Mound") in Kent.

A third Anglo-Saxon god that is attested is Tiw. In the Anglo-Saxon rune poem, Tir is identified with the star Polaris rather than with a deity, although it has been suggested that Tiw was probably a war deity. Dunn has suggested that Tiw might have been a supreme creator deity who was nevertheless deemed distant. The name Tiw has been identified in such place-names as Tuesley ("Tiw's Wood or Clearing") in Surrey, Tysoe ("Tiw's Hill-Spur") in Warwickshire, and Tyesmere ("Tiw's Pool") in Worcestershire. It has been suggested that the "T"-rune which appears on some weapons and crematory urns from the Anglo-Saxon period may be references to Tiw. Also, there is Tīƿesdæġ, which in Modern English has become "Tuesday."

"A worm came creeping, he tore a man in two, then Woden took nine Glory-Twigs, then struck the adder, that it flew apart into nine [bits] ... [Woden] established [the nine herbs] and sent [them] into the seven worlds, for the poor and the rich, a remedy for all, it stands against pain, it fights against poison, it avails against three and against thirty, against foe's hand and against noble scheming, against enchantment of vile creatures."

— The Nine Herbs Charm.

Perhaps the most prominent female deity in Anglo-Saxon paganism was Frig; however, there is still very little evidence for her worship, although it has been speculated that she was "a goddess of love or festivity". Her name has been suggested as a component of the place-names Fretherne in Gloucestershire, and Freefolk, Frobury, and Froyle in Hampshire.

The East Saxon royalty claimed lineage from someone known as Seaxnēat, who might have been a god, in part because an Old Saxon baptismal vow calls on the Christian to renounce "Thunaer, Woden and Saxnot". A runic poem mentions a god known as Ingwine and the writer Asser mentioned a god known as Gēat. The Christian monk known as the Venerable Bede also mentioned two further goddesses in his written works: Eostre, who was celebrated at a spring festival, and Hretha, whose name meant "glory".

References to idols can be found in Anglo-Saxon texts. No wooden carvings of anthropomorphic figures have been found in the area that once encompassed Anglo-Saxon England that are comparable to those found in Scandinavia or continental Europe. It may be that such sculptures were typically made out of wood, which has not survived in the archaeological record. Several anthropomorphic images have been found, mostly in Kent and dated to the first half of the seventh century; however, identifying these with any particular deity has not proven possible. A seated male figure appears on a cremation urn's lid discovered at Spong Hill in Norfolk, which was interpreted as a possible depiction of Woden on a throne. Also found on many crematory urns are a variety of symbols; of these, the swastikas have sometimes been interpreted as symbols associated with Thunor.

=== Wights ===
Many Anglo-Saxonists have also assumed that Anglo-Saxon paganism was animistic in basis, believing in a landscape populated by different spirits and other non-human entities, such as elves, dwarves, and dragons. The English literature scholar Richard North for instance described it as a "natural religion based on animism". Dunn suggested that for Anglo-Saxon pagans, most everyday interactions would not have been with major deities but with such "lesser supernatural beings". She also suggested that these entities might have exhibited similarities with later English beliefs in fairies. Later Anglo-Saxon texts refer to beliefs in ælfe (elves), who are depicted as male but exhibit effeminate traits; these ælfe may have been a part of older pagan beliefs. Elves seem to have remained in beliefs even post-Christianisation, as evidenced by the presence of the Anglo-Saxon language prefix ælf in early given names, such as Ælfsiġe (elf victory), Ælfwynn (elf friend), Ælfgār (elf spear), Ælfgifu (elf gift), Ælfríc (elf power) and Ælfrǣd (modern Alfred, meaning "elf counsel"), amongst others. Various Old English place names reference þyrsas (giants) and dracan (dragons). However, such names did not necessarily emerge during the pagan period of early Anglo-Saxon England, and could have developed at a later date.

=== Legend and poetry ===
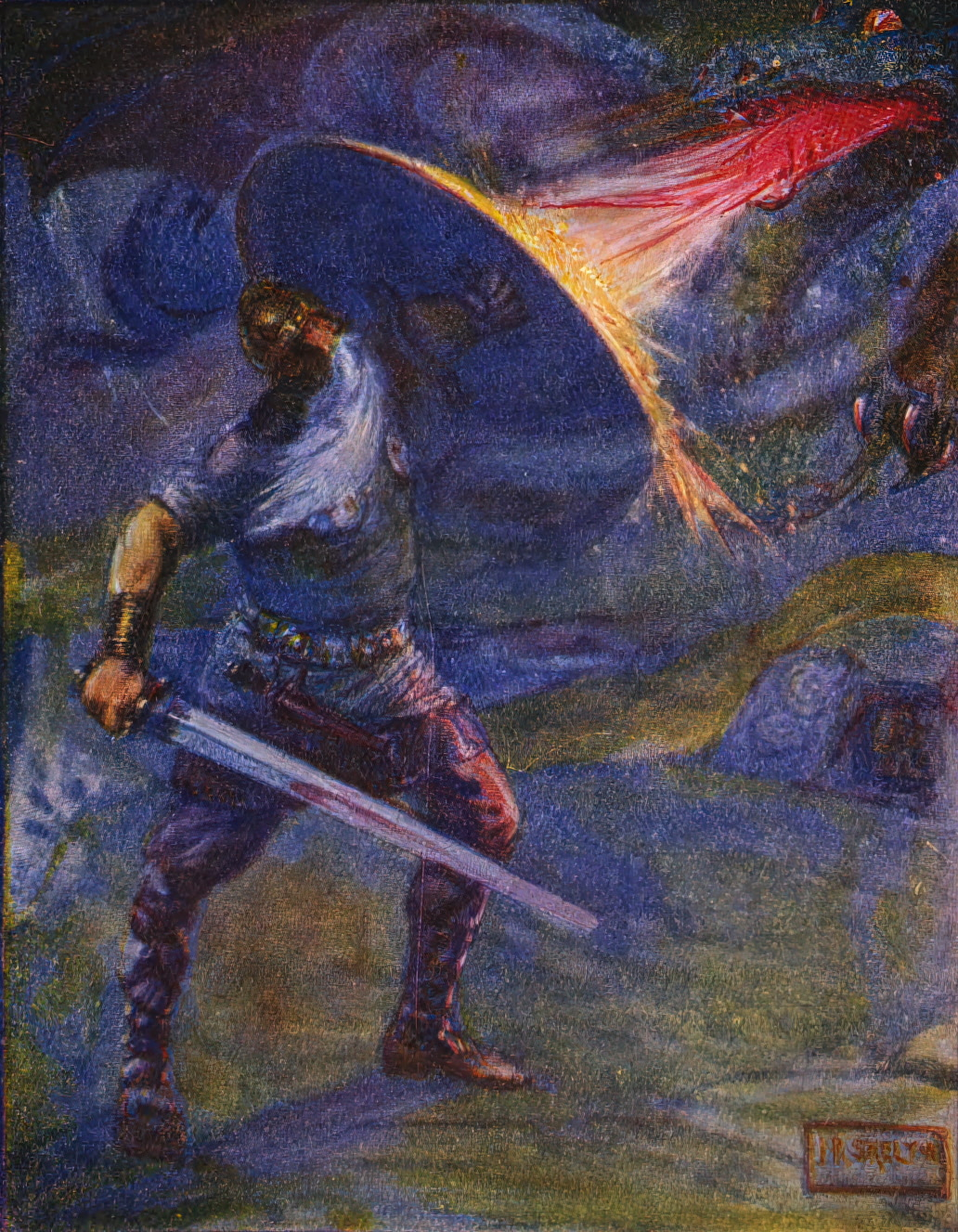
A 1908 depiction of Beowulf fighting the dragon, by J. R. Skelton

In pre-Christian Anglo-Saxon England, legends and other stories were transmitted orally instead of being written down; it is for this reason that very few survive today.

In both Beowulf and Deor's Lament there are references to the mythological smith Weyland, and this figure also makes an appearance on the Franks Casket. There are moreover two place-names recorded in tenth century charters that include Weyland's name. This entity's mythological stories are better fleshed out in Norse stories.

The only surviving Anglo-Saxon epic poem is the story of Beowulf, known only from a surviving manuscript that was written down by the Christian monk Sepa sometime between the eighth and eleventh centuries AD. The story it tells is set not in England but in Southern Scandinavia, and revolves around a Geatish warrior named Beowulf who travels to Denmark to defeat a monster known as Grendel, who is terrorising the kingdom of Hrothgar, and later, Grendel's Mother as well. Following this, he later becomes the king of Geatland before finally dying in battle with a dragon. In the eighteenth and early nineteenth centuries, it was commonly believed that Beowulf was not an Anglo-Saxon pagan tale, but a Scandinavian Christian one; it was not until the influential critical essay Beowulf: The Monsters and the Critics by J. R. R. Tolkien, delivered in 1936, that Beowulf was established as a quintessentially English poem that, while Christian, looked back on a living memory of paganism. The poem refers to pagan practices such as cremation burials, but also contains repeated mentions of the Christian God and references to tales from Biblical mythology, such as that of Cain and Abel. Given the restricted nature of literacy in Anglo-Saxon England, it is likely that the author of the poem was a cleric or an associate of the clergy.

Nonetheless, some academics still hold reservations about accepting it as containing information pertaining to Anglo-Saxon paganism, with Patrick Wormald noting that "vast reserves of intellectual energy have been devoted to threshing this poem for grains of authentic pagan belief, but it must be admitted that the harvest has been meagre. The poet may have known that his heroes were pagans, but he did not know much about paganism." Similarly, Christine Fell declared that, when it came to paganism, the poet who authored Beowulf had "little more than a vague awareness of what was done 'in those days'." Conversely, North argued that the poet knew more about paganism than he revealed in the poem, suggesting that this could be seen in some of the language and references.

== Cultic practice ==
As archaeologist Sarah Semple noted, "the rituals [of the early Anglo-Saxons] involved the full pre-Christian repertoire: votive deposits, furnished burial, monumental mounds, sacred natural phenomenon and eventually constructed pillars, shrines and temples", thereby having many commonalities with other pre-Christian religions in Europe. Weapons, amongst them spears, swords, seaxes, and shield fittings have been found in English rivers, such as the River Thames, although no large-scale weapons deposits in wetlands have been discovered that are akin to those found elsewhere in Europe.

=== Places of worship ===
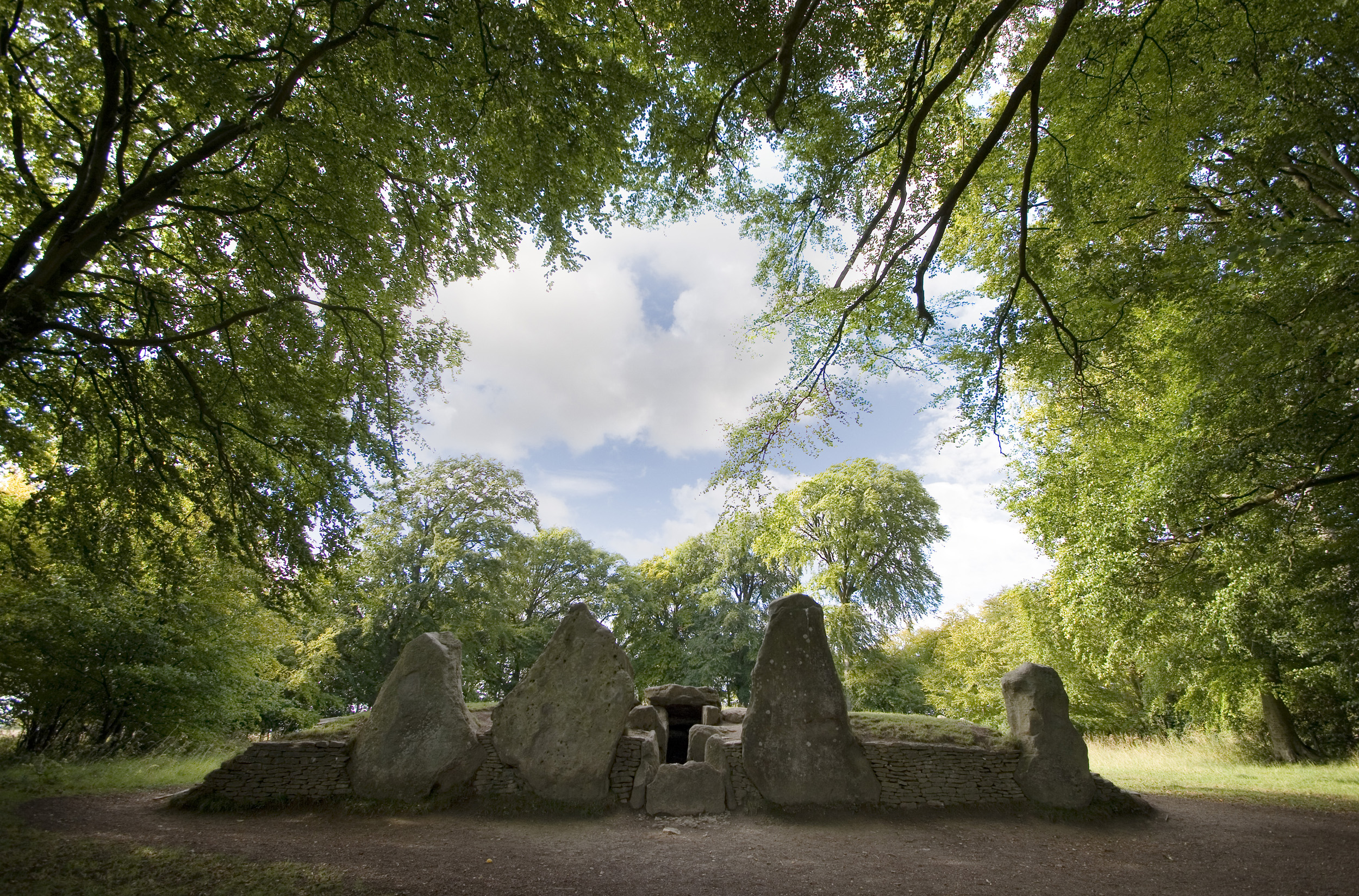
The Neolithic long barrow of Wayland's Smithy may have had cultic symbolism for the pre-Christian Anglo-Saxons.

Place-name evidence may indicate some locations which were used as places of worship by the pre-Christian Anglo-Saxons. However, no unambiguous archaeological evidence currently supports the interpretation of these sites as places of cultic practice. Two words that appear repeatedly in Old English place names hearg and wēoh, have been interpreted as being references to cult spaces, however it is likely that the two terms had distinctive meanings. These hearg locations were all found on high ground, with Wilson suggesting that these represented a communal place of worship for a specific group, such as the tribe, at a specific time of year. The archaeologist Sarah Semple also examined a number of such sites, noting that while they all reflected activity throughout later prehistory and the Romano-British period, they had little evidence from the sixth and seventh centuries CE. She suggested that rather than referring to specifically Anglo-Saxon cultic sites, hearg was instead used in reference to "something British in tradition and usage."

Highlighting that while wēoh sites vary in their location, some being on high ground and others on low ground, Wilson noted that the majority were very close to ancient routeways. Accordingly, he suggested that the term wēoh denoted a "small, wayside shrine, accessible to the traveller". Given that some wēoh-sites were connected to the name of an individual, Wilson suggested that such individuals may have been the owner or guardian of the shrine.

A number of place-names including reference to pre-Christian deities compound these names with the Old English word lēah ("wood", or "clearing in a wood"), and this may have attested to a sacred grove at which cultic practice took place. A number of other place-names associate the deity's name with a high point in the landscape, such as dūn or hōh, which might represent that such spots were considered particularly appropriate for cultic practice. In six examples, the deity's name is associated with feld ("open land"), in which case these might have been sanctuaries located to specifically benefit the agricultural actions of the community.

Some Old English place names make reference to an animal's head, among them Gateshead ("Goat's Head") in Tyne and Wear and Worms Heath ("Snake's Head") in Surrey. It is possible that some of these names had pagan religious origins, perhaps referring to a sacrificed animal's head that was erected on a pole, or a carved representation of one; equally some or all of these place-names may have been descriptive metaphors for local landscape features.

==== Built structures ====
"The idol temples of that race [the English] should by no means be destroyed, but only the idols in them. Take holy water and sprinkle it in these shrines, build altars and place relics in them. For if the shrines are well built, it is essential that they should be changed from the worship of devils to the service of the true God. When the people see that their shrines are not destroyed they will be able to banish error from their hearts and be more ready to come to the places they are familiar with, but now recognizing and worshipping the true God."

— Pope Gregory's letter to Mellitus.

No cultic building has survived from the early Anglo-Saxon period, nor does any contemporary illustration or even a clear description of such a structure. However, four references to pre-Christian cultic structures appear in Anglo-Saxon literary sources. Three of these can be found in Bede's Ecclesiastical History. One is a quotation from a letter written in 601 by Pope Gregory the Great to the Abbot Mellitus, in which he stated that Christian missionaries need not destroy "the temples of the idols" but that they should be sprinkled with holy water and converted into churches. A second reference to cultic spaces found in Bede appears in his discussion of Coifi, an influential English pagan priest for King Edwin of Northumbria, who – after converting to Christianity – cast a spear into the temple at Goodmanham and then burned it to the ground. The third account was a reference to a temple in which King Rædwald of East Anglia kept an altar to both the Christian God and another to "demons". Bede referred to these spaces using the Latin term fanum; he did not mention whether they were roofed or not, although he chose to use fanum over the Latin term templum, which would more clearly describe a roofed temple building. However, Bede probably never saw a pagan cultic space first hand, and was thus relying on literary sources for his understanding of what they looked like.

Summarising the archaeological evidence, C. J. Arnold concluded that "the existence and nature of possible shrines remain intangible at present". The best known archaeological candidate for a building used in pre-Christian cultic practice is Building D2 at the Ad Gefrin royal villa complex at Yeavering in Northumberland. Inside the east door of the building was a pit filled with ox skulls, which have been interpreted as sacrificial deposits, while two post-holes inside the building have been interpreted as evidence for holding statues of the deities, and the building also showed no evidence of domestic usage, suggesting some special function. Blair suggested that the development of temple buildings in the late sixth and seventh centuries reflects the assimilation of Christian ideas.

"Bede's evidence and archaeology show that sanctuaries associated with royal estates at the end of the pagan period are likely to have been enclosures containing buildings of organic materials, with images of the gods inside. Earlier, in the countryside, the sanctuaries were probably open air sites, on hills or in forest groves, with some kind of central feature. Ceremonies which took place at these sites included at least one annually (probably around November) which involved a large sacrifice of cattle."

— Audrey Meaney, 1995.

Other possible temples or shrine buildings have been identified by archaeological investigation as existing within such Anglo-Saxon cemeteries as Lyminge in Kent and Bishopstone in Sussex. Although Pope Gregory referred to the conversion of pagan cult spaces into churches, no archaeological investigation has yet found any firm evidence of churches being built on top of earlier pagan temples in England. It may be that Gregory's advice was never taken by the Anglo-Saxon Christians, although it is possible that the construction of crypts and the rebuilding of churches have destroyed earlier pagan foundations.

Blair highlighted evidence for the existence of square enclosures dating from the early Anglo-Saxon period which often included standing posts and which were often superimposed on earlier prehistoric monuments, most notably Bronze Age barrows. He argued that these were cultic spaces, and that—rather than being based on a tradition from continental Europe—they were based on a tradition of square enclosure building that dated back to the Pre-Roman Iron Age in Britain, thus reflecting the adoption of indigenous British ideas into early Anglo-Saxon cult. Building on Blair's argument, the archaeologist Sarah Semple suggested that in Early Anglo-Saxon England such barrows might have been understood as "the home of spirits, ancestors or gods" and accordingly used as cultic places. According to Semple "ancient remains in the landscape held a significant place in the Anglo-Saxon mind as part of a wider, numinous, spiritual and resonant landscape".

Blair suggested that the scant archaeological evidence for built cultic structures may be because many cultic spaces in early Anglo-Saxon England did not involve buildings. Supporting this, he highlighted ethnographically recorded examples from elsewhere in Northern Europe, such as among the Mansi, in which shrines are located away from the main area of settlement, and are demarcated by logs, ropes, fabrics, and images, none of which would leave an archaeological trace. Arnold suggested that it may be mistaken to assume that the pre-Christian Anglo-Saxons carried out ritual activity at specific sites, instead suggesting that such practices occurred within the domestic area. As evidence, he pointed to certain deposits that have been excavated in Anglo-Saxon settlements, such as the deposition of an adult cow above a pit of clay and cobbles which had been placed at Cowdery's Down. The deposition of human and animal bone in settlement sites has parallels both with continental practices and with Iron Age and Romano-British practices in Britain.

==== Cultic trees and megaliths ====
"Let us raise a hymn, especially because He who thrust into Tartarus of terrible torture the ghastly three-tongued serpent who vomits torrents of rank and virulent poisons through the ages deigned in like measure to send to earth the offspring begotten of holy parturition... and because where once the crude pillars of the same foul snake and the stag were worshipped with coarse stupidity in profane shrines, in their place dwelling for students, not to mention holy houses of prayer, are constructed skilfully by the talents of the architect."

— Aldhelm's letter to Heahfrith, 680s.

Although there are virtually no references to pre-Christian sacred trees in Old English literature, there are condemnations of tree veneration as well as the veneration of stones and wells in several later Anglo-Saxon penitentials. In the 680s, the Christian writer Aldhelm referred to the pagan use of pillars associated with the "foul snake and stag", praising the fact that many had been converted into sites for Christian worship. Aldhelm had used the Latin terms ermula cruda ("crude pillars"), although it was unclear what exactly he was referring to; possibly examples include something akin to a wooden totem pole or a re-used Neolithic menhir. Meaney suggested that Aldhelm's reference to the snake and stag might be describing a representation of an animal's head atop a pole, in which case it would be related to the animal-head place-names. North also believed that this snake and stag were animals with pagan religious associations.

It remains difficult to determine the location of any pre-Christian holy trees. However, there are cases where sacred trees and groves may be referenced in place-names. Blair suggested that the use of the Old English word bēam ("tree") in Anglo-Saxon place-names may be a reference to a special tree. He also suggested that the place-names containing stapol ("post" or "pillar") might have represented trees that had been venerated when alive and which were transformed into carved pillars after their death. For instance, both Thurstable Hundred in Essex and Thurstaple in Kent appear to have derived from the Old English Þunres-stapol, meaning 'Pillar of Þunor'. Archaeologically, a large post was discovered at Yeavering which has been interpreted as having a religious function. The purpose of such poles remains debatable, however; some might have represented grave markers, others might have signalised group or kin identities, or marked territory, assembly places, or sacred spaces. Such wooden pillars would have been easy to convert into large crucifixes following the conversion to Christianity, and thus a number of these sacred sites may have survived as cultic spaces within a Christian context. It has also been suggested that the vinescroll patterns that decorated a number of Late Anglo-Saxon stone crosses, such as the Ruthwell Cross, may have been a form of inculturation harking back to pre-Christian tree veneration. As Bintley commented, the impact of pre-Christian beliefs about sacred trees on Anglo-Saxon Christian beliefs should be interpreted "not as pagan survivals, but as a fully integrated aspect of early English Christianity".

=== Sacrifice ===
Christian sources regularly complained that the pagans of Anglo-Saxon England practised animal sacrifice. In the seventh century, the first laws against pagan sacrifices appeared, while in the Paenitentiale Theodori one to ten years' penance was allotted for making sacrifices or for eating sacrificed meat. Archaeological evidence reveals that meat was often used as a funerary offering and in many cases whole animal carcasses were placed in burials. Commenting on this archaeological evidence, Pluskowski stated that this reflected "a regular and well-established practice in early Anglo-Saxon society". It appears that they emphasised the killing of oxen over other species, as suggested by both written and archaeological evidence. The Old English Martyrology records that November (Old English Blōtmōnaþ "the month of sacrifice") was particularly associated with sacrificial practices:

Old English	Translation
Sē mōnaþ is nemned Novembris on Lǣden, and on ūre ġeþēode "blōtmōnaþ", for þon þe ūre ieldran, þā hīe hǣðene wǣron, on þām mōnaþe hīe blēoton ā, þæt is þæt hīe betāhton and benemdon heora dēofolġieldum þā nēat þā þe hīe woldon sellan.	"The month is called Novembris in Latin, and in our language 'sacrifice month', because our ancestors, when they were heathens, always sacrificed in this month; that is, they took and devoted to their idols the cattle which they wished to offer."

There are several cases where animal remains were buried in what appears to be ritualistic conditions, for instance at Frilford, Berkshire, a pig or boar's head was buried with six flat stones and two Roman-era tiles then placed on top, while at an Anglo-Saxon cemetery in Soham, Cambridgeshire, an ox's head was buried with the muzzle facing down. Archaeologist David Wilson stated that these may be "evidence of sacrifices to a pagan god". The folklorist Jacqueline Simpson has suggested that some English folk customs recorded in the late medieval and early modern periods involving the display of a decapitated animal's head on a pole may derive their origins from pre-Christian sacrificial practices.

Unlike some other areas of Germanic Europe, there is no written evidence for human sacrifice being practised in Anglo-Saxon England. Dunn argued that had Christian writers believed that such practices were being carried out, they would have strongly condemned them. But in the view of the historian Hilda Ellis Davidson, "undoubtedly human sacrifice must have been known to the Anglo-Saxons, even if it played no great part in their lives". She suggested that victims included slaves, criminals, or prisoners of war, and that such sacrifices were only resorted to in times of crisis, such as plagues, famine, or attack. Some historians have speculated that twenty-three of the corpses at the Sutton Hoo burial site were sacrificial victims clustered around a sacred tree from which they had been hanged. The historian Ronald Hutton has suggested that the corpse of an Anglo-Saxon woman found at Sewerby on the Yorkshire Wolds may have been buried alive alongside a nobleman, possibly as a sacrifice, or to accompany him to the afterlife.

=== Priests ===
Wilson stated that "virtually nothing" was known of the pre-Christian priesthood in Anglo-Saxon England, although there are two references to Anglo-Saxon pagan priests in the surviving textual sources. One is that provided by Bede, which refers to Coifi of Northumbria. North has backed William Chaney's view that kings mediated between the gods and the people on the basis of a lack of any obvious priesthood, although Dunn feels the concept of 'sacral kingship' no longer has much credibility within scholarship; a trend observable in scholarship of the last several decades regarding ideas of priest kings in several other ancient cultures around the world (for example the Minoan civilization and Indus Valley Civilization).

One of the inhumation burials excavated at Yeavering, classified as Grave AX, has been interpreted as being that of a pre-Christian priest; although the body was not able to be sexed or aged by osteoarchaeologists, it was found with a goat's skull buried by its feet and a long wooden staff with metal fittings beside it. There have also been suggestions that individuals who were biologically male but who were buried in female costume may have represented a form of magico-religious specialists in Anglo-Saxon England. It has been suggested that these individuals were analogous to the Seiðmenn recorded in Old Norse sources. This possibility is linked to an account provided by Tacitus in his Germania in which he refers to a male pagan priest who wore female clothing.

Campbell suggested that it might have been priestly authorities who organised the imposition of physical penalties in early Anglo-Saxon England, with secular authorities only taking on this role during the conversion to Christianity.

=== Kings ===
Germanic pagan society was structured hierarchically, under a tribal chieftain or cyning ("king") who at the same time acted as military leader, high judge and high priest. The tribe was bound together by a code of customary proper behaviour or sidu regulating the contracts (ǣ) and conflicts between the individual families or sibbs within the tribe. The aristocratic society arrayed below the king included the ranks of ealdormann, þeġn, hēahġerēfa and ġerēfa.

Offices at the court included that of the þyle and the sċop. The title of hlāford ("lord") denoted the head of any household in origin and expressed the relation to allegiance between a follower and his leader. Early Anglo-Saxon warfare had many aspects of endemic warfare typical of tribal warrior societies. It was based on retainers bound by oath to fight for their lords who in turn were obliged to show generosity to their followers.

The traditional idea was that the pagan Anglo-Saxons inherited the common Germanic institution of sacral kingship. A king (cyning) was elected from among eligible members of a royal family or cynn by the witena ġemōt, an assembly of an elite that replaced the earlier folkmoot, which was the equivalent of the Germanic thing, the assembly of all free men. The person elected was usually the son of the last king. Tribal kingship came to an end in the 9th century with the hegemony of Wessex culminating in a unified kingdom of England by the 10th century. The cult of kingship was central to pagan Anglo-Saxon society. The king was equivalent to the position of high priest. By his divine descent he represented or indeed was the "luck" of the people. The central importance of the institution of kingship is illustrated by the twenty-six synonyms for "king" employed by the Beowulf poet.

The title of Bretwalda appears to have conveyed the status of some sort of formal or ceremonial overlordship over Britain, but it is uncertain whether it predates the 9th century, and if it does, what, if any, prerogatives it carried. Patrick Wormald interprets it as "less an objectively realised office than a subjectively perceived status" and emphasises the partiality of its usage in favour of Southumbrian kings.

=== Funerary rites ===
Funerary urn from the Snape Anglo-Saxon Cemetery

Cemeteries are the most widely excavated aspect of Anglo-Saxon archaeology and thus much information about the funerary aspects of Anglo-Saxon pagan religion has been obtained.

One of the aspects of Anglo-Saxon paganism which is the most known most about is their burial customs, discovered from archaeological excavations at various sites, including Sutton Hoo, Spong Hill, Prittlewell, Snape and Walkington Wold, with 1200 Anglo-Saxon pagan cemeteries having been found. The pagan Anglo-Saxons had no set form of burial, with cremation being preferred among the Angles in the north and burial among the Saxons in the south, although both forms were found throughout England, sometimes in the same cemeteries. When cremation did take place, the ashes were usually placed within an urn and then buried, sometimes along with grave goods. According to archaeologist Dave Wilson, "the usual orientation for an inhumation in a pagan Anglo-Saxon cemetery was west-east, with the head to the west, although there were often deviations from this." Indicating a possible religious belief, grave goods were common among inhumation burials as well as cremations; free Anglo-Saxon men were buried with at least one weapon in the pagan tradition, often a seax, but sometimes also with a spear, sword or shield, or a combination of these. There are also a number of recorded cases of parts of non-human animals being buried within such graves. Most common among these was body parts belonging to either goats or sheep, although parts of oxen were also relatively common, and there are also isolated cases of goose, crab apples, duck eggs and hazelnuts being buried in graves. It is widely thought therefore that such items constituted a food source for the deceased. In some cases, animal skulls, particularly oxen but also pig, were buried in human graves, a practice that was also found in earlier Roman Britain.

Certain Anglo-Saxon burials appeared to have ritualistic elements to them, implying that a religious rite was performed over them during the funeral. While there are many multiple burials, where more than one corpse was found in a single grave, that date from the Anglo-Saxon period, there is "a small group of such burials where an interpretation involving ritual practices may be possible". For instance, at Welbeck Hill in Lincolnshire, the corpse of a decapitated woman was placed in reverse on top of the body of an old man, while in a number of other similar examples, female bodies were again placed above those of men. This has led some archaeologists to suspect a form of suttee, where the female was the spouse of the male, and was killed to accompany him upon death. Other theories hold that the females were slaves who were viewed as the property of the men, and who were again killed to accompany their master. Similarly, four Anglo-Saxon burials have been excavated where it appears that the individual was buried while still alive, which could imply that this was a part of either a religious rite or as a form of punishment. There are also many cases where corpses have been found decapitated, for instance, at a mass grave in Thetford, Norfolk, fifty beheaded individuals were discovered, their heads possibly having been taken as trophies of war. In other cases of decapitation it seems possible that it was evidence of religious ritual (presumably human sacrifice) or execution.

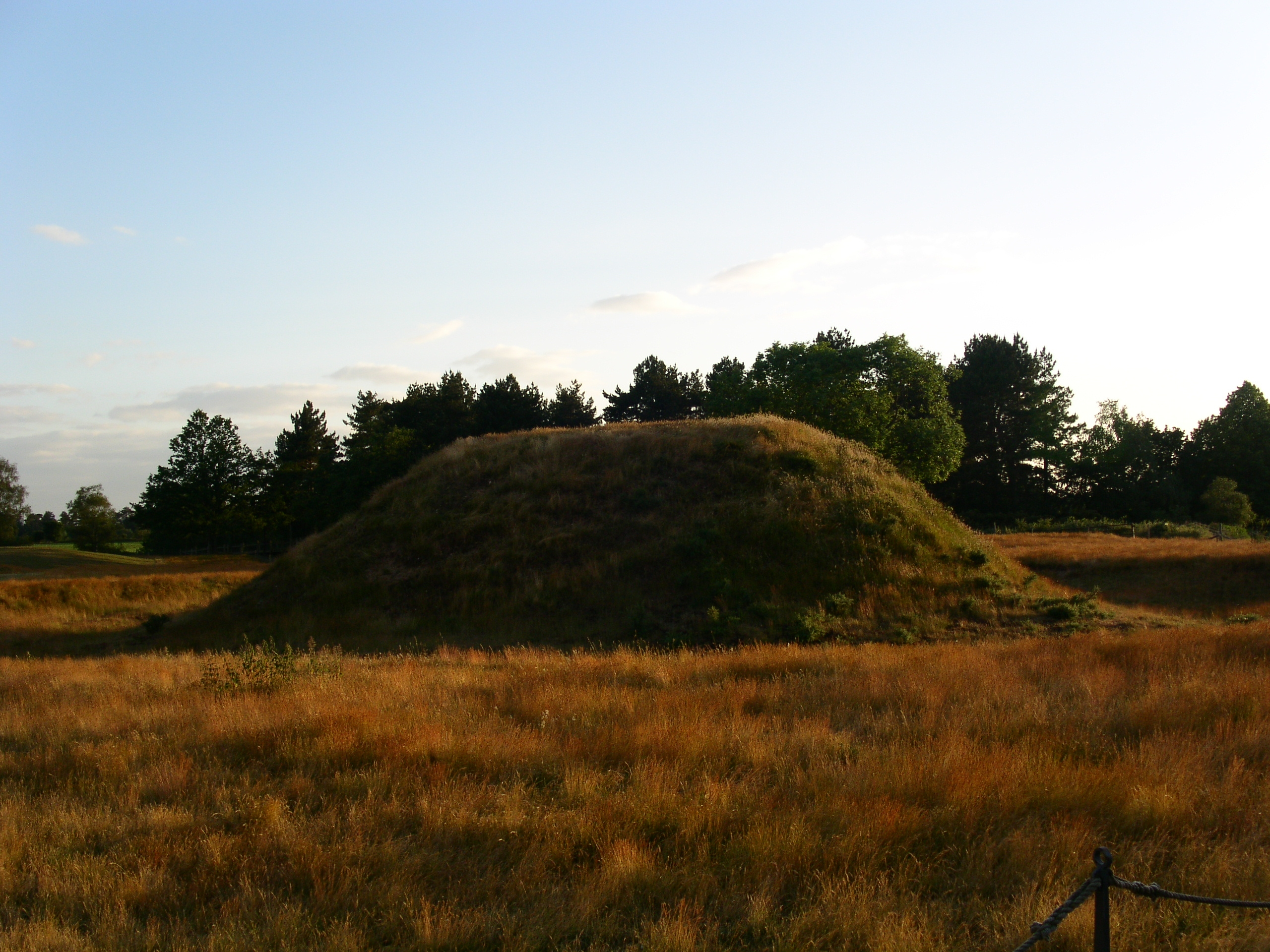
One of the burial mounds at Sutton Hoo

Archaeological investigation has displayed that structures or buildings were built inside a number of pagan cemeteries, and as David Wilson noted, "The evidence, then, from cemetery excavations is suggestive of small structures and features, some of which may perhaps be interpreted as shrines or sacred areas". In some cases, there is evidence of far smaller structures being built around or alongside individual graves, implying possible small shrines to the dead individual or individuals buried there.

Eventually, in the sixth and seventh centuries, the idea of burial mounds began to appear in Anglo-Saxon England, and in certain cases earlier burial mounds from the Neolithic, Bronze Age, Iron Age and Romano-British periods were simply reused by the Anglo-Saxons. It is not known why they adopted this practice, but it may be from the practices of the native Britons. Burial mounds remained objects of veneration in early Anglo-Saxon Christianity, and numerous churches were built next to tumuli. Another form of burial was that of ship burials, which were practised by many of the Germanic peoples across northern Europe. In many cases it seems that the corpse was placed in a ship that was either sent out to sea or left on land, but in both cases burned. In Suffolk however, ships were not burned, but buried, as is the case at Sutton Hoo, which it is believed, was the resting place of the king of the East Angles, Raedwald. Both ship and tumulus burials were described in the Beowulf poem, through the funerals of Scyld Scefing and Beowulf respectively.

It has been considered largely impossible to distinguish a pagan grave from a Christian one in the Anglo-Saxon context after the latter had spread throughout England.

=== Festivals ===
"These few remarks by Bede show us a people who of necessity fitted closely into the pattern of the changing year, who were of the earth and what grows in it, who breathed the farmy exhalations of cattle and sheep, who marked the passage of time according to the life-cycle of their stock and the growth of their plants or by the appropriate period for offerings to the gods".

— Historian Brian Branston, 1957.

Everything so far known about the religious festivals of the pagan Anglo-Saxons comes from a book written by Bede, titled De temporum ratione ("The Reckoning of Time"), in which he described the calendar of the year. However, its purpose was not to describe the pagan sacred year, and little information within it can be corroborated from other sources. Bede provided explanations for the names of the various pre-Christian festivals that he described, however these etymologies are questionable; it is unknown if these etymologies were based on his pre-existing knowledge or whether they represented his own theories. Casting further doubt over some of his festival etymologies is the fact that some of the place-name etymologies that Bede provides in his writings are demonstrably wrong.

The pagan Anglo-Saxons followed a calendar with twelve lunar months, with the occasional year having thirteen months so that the lunar and solar alignment could be corrected. Bede claimed that the greatest pagan festival was Modraniht (meaning Mothers' Night), which was situated at the Winter solstice, which marked the start of the Anglo-Saxon year.

Following this festival, in the month of Solmonað (February), Bede claims that the pagans offered cakes to their deities. Then, in Eostur-monath Aprilis (April), a spring festival was celebrated, dedicated to the goddess Eostre, and the later Christian festival of Easter took its name from this month and its goddess. The month of September was known as Halegmonath, meaning Holy Month, which may indicate that it had special religious significance. The month of November was known as Blōtmōnaþ, meaning Blót Month, and was commemorated with animal sacrifice, both in offering to the gods, and probably also to gather a source of food to be stored over the winter.

Remarking on Bede's account of the Anglo-Saxon year, the historian Brian Branston noted that they "show us a people who of necessity fitted closely into the pattern of the changing year, who were of the earth and what grows in it" and that they were "in fact, a people who were in a symbiotic relationship with mother earth and father sky". Stenton thought that Bede's account reveals "that there was a strong element of heathen festivity" at the heart of the early Anglo-Saxon calendar. The historian James Campbell described this as a "complicated calendar", and stated that it would have required "an organised and recognised priesthood" to plan the observation of it.

=== Symbolism ===
Various recurring symbols appear on certain pagan Anglo-Saxon artefacts, in particular on grave goods. Most notable among these was the swastika, which was widely inscribed on crematory urns and also on various brooches and other forms of jewellery as well as on certain pieces of ceremonial weaponry. The archaeologist David Wilson remarked that this "undoubtedly had special importance for the Anglo-Saxons, either magical or religious, or both. It seems very likely that it was the symbol of the thunder god Thunor, and when found on weapons or military gear its purpose would be to provide protection and success in battle". He also noted however that its widespread usage might have led to it becoming "a purely decorative device with no real symbolic importance". Another symbol that has appeared on several pagan artefacts from this period, including a number of swords, was the rune ᛏ, which represented the letter T and may be associated with the god Tiw.

In the later sixth and seventh centuries, a trend emerged in Anglo-Saxon England entailing the symbolism of a horn-helmeted man. The archaeologist Tim Pestell stated that these represented "one of the clearest examples of objects with primarily cultic or religious connotations". This iconography is not unique to England and can be found in Scandinavia and continental Germanic Europe too. The inclusion of this image on helmets and pendants suggests that it may have had apotropaic or amuletic associations. This figure has often been interpreted as a depiction of Woden, although there is no firm evidence to support this conclusion.

=== Shamanism, magic, and witchcraft ===
In 2011, Pluskowski noted that the term "shamanism" was increasingly being used by scholars of Anglo-Saxon paganism. Glosecki argued that evidence for shamanic beliefs were visible in later Anglo-Saxon literature. Williams also argued that paganism had a shamanic component through his analysis of early funerary rites. Summarising this evidence, Blair noted that it was "hard to doubt that something like shamanism lies ultimately in the background" of early Anglo-Saxon religion. He nevertheless highlighted problems with the use of "shamanism" in this context, noting that any such Anglo-Saxon practices would have been different from the shamanism of Siberia. Conversely, Noël Adams stated that "at present, there is no clear evidence of shamanistic beliefs" in Anglo-Saxon England.

Anglo-Saxon pagans believed in magic and witchcraft. There are various Old English terms for "witch", including hæġtesse "witch" (whence Modern English hag), wiċċa, ġealdriċġe, sċīnlǣċe and helrūne. The belief in witchcraft was suppressed in the 9th to 10th century as is evident e.g. from the Laws of Ælfred (c. 890). It is possible that the Anglo-Saxons drew no distinction between magic and ritual in the same manner as modern Western society does.

The Christian authorities attempted to stamp out a belief and practice in witchcraft, with the Paenitentiale Theodori attributed to Theodore of Tarsus condemning "those that consult divinations and use them in the pagan manner, or that permit people of that kind into their houses to seek some knowledge". Similarly, the U version of the Paenitentiale Theodori condemns those "who observe auguries, omens or dreams or any other prophecies after the manner of the pagans".

The word wiccan "witches" is associated with animistic healing rites in the Paenitentiale Halitgari where it is stated that:

Some men are so blind that they bring their offering to earth-fast stone and also to trees and to wellsprings, as the witches teach, and are unwilling to understand how stupidly they do or how that dead stone or that dumb tree might help them or give forth health when they themselves are never able to stir from their place.

The pagan Anglo-Saxons also appeared to wear amulets, and there are many cases in which corpses were buried with them. As David Wilson noted, "To the early [Anglo-]Saxons, they were part and parcel of the supernatural that made up their world of 'belief', although occupying the shadowy dividing area between superstition and religion, if indeed such a division actually existed." One of the most notable amulets found in Anglo-Saxon graves is the cowrie shell, which has been often interpreted by modern academics as having been a fertility symbol due to its physical resemblance to the vagina and the fact that it was most commonly found in female graves. Not being native to British seas, the cowrie shells had to have been brought to England by traders who had come all the way from the Red Sea in the Middle East. Animal teeth were also used as amulets by the pagan Anglo-Saxons, and many examples have been found that had formerly belonged to boar, beaver, and in some cases even humans. Other amulets included items such as amethyst and amber beads, pieces of quartz or iron pyrite, worked and unworked flint, pre-Anglo-Saxon coinage and fossils, and from their distribution in graves, it has been stated that in Anglo-Saxon pagan society, "amulets [were] very much more the preserve of women than men".

== Reception and legacy ==
=== Days of the week ===
Six of the modern English days of the week derive their names from Anglo-Saxon deities. These names have their origins in the Latin system of week-day names, which had been translated into Old English.

The Anglo-Saxons, like other Germanic peoples, adapted the week-day names introduced by their interaction with the Roman Empire but glossed their indigenous gods over the Roman deities (with the exception of Saturday) in a process known as Interpretatio germanica:

Modern English day name	Old English day name	English day name meaning	Glossed from Latin day name	Latin day name meaning
Monday	Mōnandæg	"Moon's day", personified in related Norse mythology as the god Máni	Dies Lunae	"Day of Luna (moon)"
Tuesday	Tiwesdæg	"Tiw's day", personified in related Norse mythology as the god Tyr	Dies Martis	"Day of Mars"
Wednesday	Wōdnesdæg	"Woden's day", personified in related Norse mythology as the god Odin	Dies Mercurii	"Day of Mercury"
Thursday	Þūnresdæg	"Thunor's day", personified in related Norse mythology as the god Thor	Dies Iovis	"Day of Jupiter"
Friday	Frigedæg	"Frigg's day", personified in related Norse mythology as the goddess Frigg	Dies Veneris	"Day of Venus"
Saturday	Sæturnesdæg	"Saetere's day", named by the Anglo-Saxons after the Roman god Saturn as no Germanic equivalent could be found; among North Germanic peoples this day is called "washing day"	Dies Saturni	"Day of Saturn"
Sunday	Sunnandæg	"Sunna's day", personified in related Norse mythology as the goddess Sól	Dies Solis	"Day of Sol Invictus (sun)"

=== Historiography ===
"Previous understanding of the topic, well rooted in the ideas of its time, regarded the English as adherents of two consecutive religions: paganism governed the settlers of the 4th-6th century, but was superseded in the 7th-10th century by Christianity. Of the two, Christianity, a religion of the book, documented itself thoroughly, while in failing to do so paganism laid itself open to centuries of abuse, conjecture or mindless admiration."

— Archaeologists Martin Carver, Alex Sanmark, and Sarah Semple, 2010.

While historical investigation into Germanic paganism and its mythology began in the seventeenth century with Peder Resen's Edda Islandorum (1665), this largely focused only upon Norse mythology, much of which was preserved in Old Icelandic sources. In the eighteenth century, English Romanticism developed a strong enthusiasm for Iceland and Nordic culture, expressed in original English poems extolling Viking virtues, such as Thomas Warton's "Runic Odes" of 1748. With nascent nationalism in early nineteenth-century Europe, by the 1830s both Nordic and German philology had produced "national mythologies" in N. F. S. Grundtvig's Nordens Mytologi and Jacob Grimm's Deutsche Mythologie, respectively. British Romanticism at the same time had at its disposal both a Celtic and a Viking revival, but nothing focusing on the Anglo-Saxons because there was very little evidence of their pagan mythology still surviving. Indeed, so scant was evidence of paganism in Anglo-Saxon England that some scholars came to assume that the Anglo-Saxons had been Christianised essentially from the moment of their arrival in Britain.

The study of Anglo-Saxon paganism began only in the mid nineteenth century, when John Kemble published The Saxons in England Volume I (1849), in which he discussed the usefulness of examining place-names to find out about the religion. This was followed by the publication of John Yonge Akerman's Remains of Pagan Saxondom (1855). Akerman defended his chosen subject in the introduction by pointing out the archaeological evidence of a "Pagan Saxon mode of sepulture" on English soil lasting from the "middle of the fifth to the middle or perhaps the end of the seventh century". From this point onward, more academic research into the Anglo-Saxons' pagan religion appeared. This led to further books on the subject, such as those primarily about the Anglo-Saxon gods, such as Brian Branston's The Lost Gods of England (1957), and Kathy Herbert's Looking for the Lost Gods of England (1994). Others emphasised archaeological evidence, such as David Wilson's Anglo-Saxon Paganism (1992) and the edited anthology Signals of Belief in Early England: Anglo-Saxon Paganism Revisited (2010).

=== Modern paganism ===
The deities of pre-Christian Anglo-Saxon religion have been adopted by practitioners of various forms of modern Paganism, specifically those belonging to the new religious movement of Heathenry. The Anglo-Saxon gods have also been adopted in forms of the modern Pagan religion of Wicca, particularly the denomination of Seax-Wicca, founded by Raymond Buckland in the 1970s, which combined Anglo-Saxon deity names with the Wiccan theological structure. Such belief systems often attribute Norse beliefs to pagan Anglo-Saxons.

== See also ==
- English mythology
- Christianity and Paganism
- List of Anglo-Saxon cemeteries

== Sources ==
- Ackerman, John Yonge (1855). Remains of Pagan Saxondom. London: John Russel Smith.
- Adams, Noël (2015). "Between Myth and Reality: Hunter and Prey in Early Anglo-Saxon Art". In Michael D. J. Bintley; Thomas T. J. Williams (eds.). Representing Beasts in Early Medieval England and Scandinavia. Woodbridge: Boydell. pp. 13–52. ISBN 978-1783270088.
- Arnold, C. J. (1997). An Archaeology of the Early Anglo-Saxon Kingdoms (new ed.). London and New York: Routledge. ISBN 9780415156363.
- Bintley, Michael D. J. (2015). Trees in the Religions of Early Medieval England. Anglo-Saxon Studies 26. Woodbridge: Boydell Press. ISBN 978-1-84383-989-7.
- Blair, John (1995). "Anglo-Saxon Pagan Shrines and their Prototypes". Anglo-Saxon Studies in Archaeology and History. 8: 1–28.
- ——— (2000). The Anglo-Saxon Age: A Very Short Introduction. Oxford: Oxford University Press. ISBN 9780192854032.
- ——— (2005). The Church in Anglo-Saxon Society. Oxford: Oxford University Press. ISBN 978-0199211173.
- ——— (2011). "The Archaeology of Religion". In Helena Hamerow; David A. Hinton; Sally Crawford (eds.). The Oxford Handbook of Anglo-Saxon Archaeology. Oxford: Oxford University Press. pp. 727–741. ISBN 978-0199212149.
- ——— (2013). "Holy Beams: Anglo-Saxon Cult Sites and the Place-Name Element Bēam". In Michael D. J. Bintley; Michael G. Shapland (eds.). Trees and Timber in the Anglo-Saxon World. Oxford: Oxford University Press. pp. 186–210. ISBN 978-0-19-968079-5.
- Bosworth, Joseph; Toller, T. Northcote (1882). An Anglo-Saxon Dictionary Based on the Manuscript Collections of Joseph Bosworth. Oxford: Clarendon. OCLC 185871468.
- Bowra, Cecil (1952). Heroic Poetry. London, UK: Macmillan.
- Branston, Brian (1957). The Lost Gods of England. London: Thames and Hudson.
- Carver, Martin (2010). "Agency, Intellect and the Archaeological Agenda". In Martin Carver; Alex Sanmark; Sarah Semple (eds.). Signals of Belief in Early England: Anglo-Saxon Paganism Revisited. Oxford and Oakville: Oxbow Books. pp. 1–20. ISBN 978-1-84217-395-4.
- Carver, Martin; Sanmark, Alex; Semple, Sarah (2010). "Preface". In Martin Carver; Alex Sanmark; Sarah Semplelocation=Oxford and Oakville (eds.). Signals of Belief in Early England: Anglo-Saxon Paganism Revisited. Oxbow Books. pp. ix–x. ISBN 978-1-84217-395-4.
- Campbell, James (2007). "Some Considerations on Religion in Early England". In Martin Henig; Tyler Jo Smith (eds.). Collectanea Antiqua: Essays in Memory of Sonia Chadwick Hawkes. Oxford: British Archaeological Reports. pp. 67–73. ISBN 978-1-4073-0108-2.
- Chaney, William A. (1970). The Cult of Kingship in Anglo-Saxon England: The Transition from Paganism to Christianity. California: University of California Press.
- Doyle White, Ethan (2014). "The Goddess Frig: Reassessing an Anglo-Saxon Deity". Preternature: Critical and Historical Studies on the Preternatural. 3 (2): 284–310. doi:10.5325/preternature.3.2.0284. JSTOR 10.5325/preternature.3.2.0284.
- Dunn, Marilyn (2009). The Christianization of the Anglo-Saxons c.597–c.700: Discourses of Life, Death and Afterlife. London and New York: Continuum.
- Ellis Davidson, Hilda (1992). "Human Sacrifice in the Late Pagan Period in North Western Europe". In Martin Carver (ed.). The Age of Sutton Hoo: The Seventh Century in North-Western Europe. Woodbridge: Boydell Press. pp. 331–340.
- Ewing, Thor (2008). Gods and Worshippers in the Viking and Germanic World. Tempus. ISBN 978-0-7524-3590-9.
- Fell, C. E. (1995). "Paganism in Beowulf: A Semantic Fairy-Tale". In T. Hofstra; L. A. J. R. Houwen; A. A. MacDonald (eds.). Pagans and Christians: The Interplay Between Christian Latin and Traditional Germanic Cultures in Early Medieval Europe. Groningen: Egbert Forsten. pp. 9–34. ISBN 9069800764.
- Gelling, Margaret (1961). "Place-Names and Anglo-Saxon Paganism". University of Birmingham Historical Journal. 8: 7–25.
- Halsall, Guy (1989). "Anthropology and the Study of Pre-Conquest Warfare and Society: The Ritual War in Anglo-Saxon England". In Hawkes (ed.). Weapons and Warfare in Anglo-Saxon England.
- Herbert, Kathleen (1994). Looking for the Lost Gods of England. Hockwold-cum-Wilton: Anglo-Saxon Books. ISBN 1-898281-04-1.
- Hooke, Della (2010). Trees in Anglo-Saxon England. Woodbridge: Boydell. ISBN 9781843835653.
- Hutton, Ronald (1991). The Pagan Religions of the Ancient British Isles: Their Nature and Legacy. Oxford and Cambridge: Blackwell. ISBN 978-0-631-17288-8.
- ——— (2013). Pagan Britain. New Haven and London: Yale University Press. ISBN 978-0-300-197716.
- Jesch, Judith (2004). "Scandinavians and 'Cultural Paganism' in Late Anglo-Saxon England". In Paul Cavill (ed.). The Christian Tradition in Anglo-Saxon England: Approaches to Current Scholarship and Teaching. Cambridge: D. S. Brewer. pp. 55–68. ISBN 978-0859918411.
- ——— (2011). "The Norse Gods in England and the Isle of Man". In Daniel Anlezark (ed.). Myths, Legends, and Heroes: Essays on Old Norse and Old English Literature. Toronto: University of Toronto Press. pp. 11–24. ISBN 978-0802099471.
- Jolly, Karen Louise (1996). Popular Religion in Late Saxon England: Elf Charms in Context. Chapel Hill: University of North Carolina Press. ISBN 978-0807845653.
- Jones, Prudence; Pennick, Nigel (1995). A History of Pagan Europe. London and New York: Routledge. ISBN 0-415-09136-5.
- Kemble, John (1849). The Saxons in England. Vol. I. London: Longman, Brown, Green and Longmans.
- Kemble, John (1876). The Saxons in England. Vol. II (2nd ed.). London: B. Quaritch.
- Meaney, Audrey (1966). "Woden in England: A Reconsideration of the Evidence". Folklore. 77 (2): 105–115. doi:10.1080/0015587x.1966.9717037. JSTOR 1258536.
- ——— (1970). "Æthelweard, Ælfric, the Norse Gods and Northumbria". Journal of Religious History. 6 (2): 105–132. doi:10.1111/j.1467-9809.1970.tb00557.x.
- ——— (1995). "Pagan English Sanctuaries, Place-Names and Hundred Meeting-Places". Anglo-Saxon Studies in Archaeology and History. 8: 29–42.
- ——— (1999). "Paganism". In Michael Lapidge; John Blair; Simon Keynes; Donald Scragg (eds.). The Blackwell Encyclopaedia of Anglo-Saxon England. Oxford and Malden: Blackwell. pp. 351–352. ISBN 978-0631155652.
- North, Richard (1997). Heathen Gods in Old English Literature. Cambridge: Cambridge University Press. ISBN 978-0521551830.
- Page, R. I. (1995). "Anglo-Saxon Paganism: The Evidence of Bede". In T. Hofstra; L. A. J. R. Houwen; A. A. MacDonald (eds.). Pagans and Christians: The Interplay Between Christian Latin and Traditional Germanic Cultures in Early Medieval Europe. Groningen: Egbert Forsten. pp. 99–129. ISBN 9069800764.
- Pestell, Tim (2012). "Paganism in Early-Anglo-Saxon East Anglia". In T. A. Heslop; Elizabeth Mellings; Margit Thøfner (eds.). Art, Faith and Place in East Anglia: From Prehistory to the Present. Boydell & Brewer. pp. 66–87.
- Pluskowski, Aleks (2011). "The Archaeology of Paganism". In Helena Hamerow; David A. Hinton; Sally Crawford (eds.). The Oxford Handbook of Anglo-Saxon Archaeology. Oxford: Oxford University Press. pp. 764–778. ISBN 978-0199212149.
- Price, Neil (2010). "Heathen Songs and Devil's Games". In Martin Carver; Alex Sanmark; Sarah Semple (eds.). Signals of Belief in Early England: Anglo-Saxon Paganism Revisited. Oxford and Oakville: Oxbow Books. pp. xiii–xvi. ISBN 978-1-84217-395-4.
- Reynolds, Andrew (1996). "Anglo-Saxon human sacrifice at Cuddesdon and Sutton Hoo?" (PDF). Papers from the Institute of Archaeology. 7: 23–30. doi:10.5334/pia.97.
- ——— (2002). "Burials, Boundaries and Charters in Anglo-Saxon England: A Reassessment". In Sam Lucy; Andrew Reynolds (eds.). Burial in Early Medieval England and Wales. The Society for Medieval Archaeology Monograph Series 17. London: The Society for Medieval Archaeology. pp. 171–194. ISBN 978-1902653655.
- Ryan, J. S. (1963). "Othin in England: Evidence from the Poetry for a Cult of Woden in Anglo-Saxon England". Folklore. 74 (3): 460–480. doi:10.1080/0015587X.1963.9716920. JSTOR i253798.
- Semple, Sarah (1998). "A Fear of the Past: The Place of the Prehistoric Burial Mound in the Ideology of Middle and Later Anglo-Saxon England". World Archaeology. 30 (1): 109–126. doi:10.1080/00438243.1998.9980400.
- ——— (2007). "Defining the OE hearg: A preliminary archaeological and topographic examination of hearg place names and their hinterlands". Early Medieval Europe. 15 (4): 364–385. doi:10.1111/j.1468-0254.2007.00212.x. S2CID 161873861.
- ——— (2010). "In the Open Air". In Martin Carver; Alex Sanmark; Sarah Semple (eds.). Signals of Belief in Early England: Anglo-Saxon Paganism Revisited. Oxford and Oakville: Oxbow Books. pp. 21–48. ISBN 978-1-84217-395-4.
- Shaw, Philip A. (2002). Uses of Wodan: The Development of his Cult and of Medieval Literary Responses to It (PDF) (Doctoral thesis). University of Leeds.
- Simpson, Jacqueline (1967). "Some Scandinavian Sacrifices". Folklore. 78 (3): 190–202. doi:10.1080/0015587x.1967.9717093. JSTOR 1258184.
- Stenton, F. M. (1941). "The Historical Bearing of Place-Name Studies: Anglo-Saxon Heathenism". Transactions of the Royal Historical Society. 23: 1–24. doi:10.2307/3678653. JSTOR 3678653. S2CID 163461388.
- ——— (1971). Anglo-Saxon England (third ed.). Oxford: Clarendon Press. ISBN 0-19-821716-1.
- Tolley, Clive (2013). "What is a 'World Tree', and Should We Expect to Find One Growing in Anglo-Saxon England?". In Michael D. J. Bintley; Michael G. Shapland (eds.). Trees and Timber in the Anglo-Saxon World. Oxford: Oxford University Press. pp. 177–185. ISBN 978-0-19-968079-5.
- Welch, Martin (2011). "Pre-Christian Practices in the Anglo-Saxon World". In Timothy Insoll (ed.). The Oxford Handbook of the Archaeology of Ritual and Religion. Oxford: Oxford University Press. pp. 863–876. ISBN 978-0-19-923244-4.
- Wilson, David (1992). Anglo-Saxon Paganism. London and New York: Routledge. ISBN 0-415-01897-8.
- Wood, Ian N. (1995). "Pagan Religions and Superstitions East of the Rhine from the Fifth to the Ninth Century". In G. Ausenda (ed.). After Empire: Towards an Ethnology of Europe's Barbarians. Woodbridge: Boydell. pp. 253–279. ISBN 978-0-85115-853-2.
- Wormald, Patrick (1978). "Bede, Beowulf and the Conversion of the Anglo-Saxon Aristocracy". In R. T. Farrell (ed.). Bede and Anglo-Saxon England. British Archaeological Reports, British Series. Vol. 46. Oxford: British Archaeological Reports. pp. 39–90.
- Wormald, Patrick (1983). "Bede, Bretwaldas and the Origins of the Gens Anglorum". In Wormald, Patrick (ed.). Ideal and Reality in Frankish and Anglo-Saxon Society. Oxford.
