= Arthur Moore =

Arthur Moore may refer to:

- A. Harry Moore (Arthur Harry Moore, 1879–1952), American politician
- Arthur A. C. Moore (1880–1935), ice hockey player of the Silver Seven
- Arthur Claude Moore (1898–1978), Australian public servant and businessman
- Arthur Cotton Moore (1935-2022), American architect
- Arthur Edward Moore (1876–1963), premier of Queensland, 1929–1932
- Arthur Moore (Manitoba politician) (1882–1950), Canadian politician
- Arthur James Moore (1888–1974), bishop of Methodist Church (Georgia, USA)
- Arthur John Moore (1849–1904), member of parliament for Clonmel and Londonderry City
- Arthur Moore (Tralee MP) (1765–1846), member of parliament for Tralee
- Arthur Moore (labor leader) (1933–2013), American labor leader
- Arthur Moore (rugby league), English rugby league footballer of the 1910s and 1920s
- Arthur Thomas Moore (1830–1913), Irish Victoria Cross recipient
- Arthur William Moore (1853–1909), linguist, folklorist and politician on the Isle of Man
- Artie Moore (1887–1949), amateur wireless operator who received SOS signals from the Titanic
- Arthur Moore (Royal Navy officer) (1847–1934), British admiral
- Arthur Moore (Grimsby MP) (c. 1666–1730), member of parliament for Great Grimsby
- Arthur B. B. Moore (1906–2004), Canadian church moderator and university administrator
- Arthur Moore (priest) (1877–1954), Archdeacon of Norfolk
- J. Arthur Moore (1891–1979), lumberman, farmer and political figure in New Brunswick, Canada
- Arthur Moore (American football) (born 1951), American football player

== See also ==
- Moore (surname)
