= Michael Handley =

Anglican priest

(Anthony) Michael Handley is an Anglican priest.

Handley was educated at Spalding Grammar School, Selwyn College, Cambridge, and Chichester Theological College. After a curacy at Thorpe St Andrew he was the Anglican Priest on the Fairstead Estate from 1966 to 1972. Handley then became the Vicar of Hellesdon, a position he held from 1972 to 1981, during which he also served as Rural Dean of Norwich North from 1979 to 1981. He was subsequently appointed Archdeacon of Norwich, a role he held from 1981 to 1993, before becoming the Archdeacon of Norfolk from 1993 until 2002.
