= Robert Honywood =

Robert Honywood may refer to:

- Robert Honywood (New Romney MP) (1601–1686), MP for New Romney
- Robert Honywood (Essex MP) (died 1735), MP for Essex
- Robert Honywood (cricketer) (1825–1870), of Marks Hall in Essex, son of William Philip Honywood, cricketer

== See also ==
- Robert Honiwood, Canon of Windsor from 1504 to 1523
- Honywood (surname)
