= Philip Jennings =

Philip Jennings may refer to:

- Philip Jennings (The Americans), fictional character in the 2010s American television drama series The Americans
- Philip Jennings (Queenborough MP) (c. 1679–1740), English lawyer and politician, MP for Queenborough 1715–22
- Sir Philip Jennings-Clerke, 1st Baronet (c. 1722–1788), known as Philip Jennings until the 1760s, MP for Totnes 1768–88
- Philip Jennings (priest) (1783–1849), Archdeacon of Norfolk
- Philip Jennings (trade unionist) (born 1953), former Welsh trade union leader

== See also ==
- Jennings
