= David Hayden =

David Hayden may refer to:

- David Hayden (RAF airman) (born 1979), Royal Air Force regiment gunner
- David Hayden (priest) (born 1947), American priest
- David E. Hayden (1897–1974), American naval officer

== See also ==
- David Haden, a character in Law & Order: Special Victims Unit
