= Fairstead =

Fairstead may refer to:

- Fairstead, Essex, a village and civil parish in England
- Fairstead, Norfolk, a housing estate in King's Lynn, England
