= Ralph Blakelock =

Ralph Blakelock may refer to:

- Ralph Albert Blakelock (1847–1919), American romanticist painter
- Ralph Anthony Blakelock (1915–1963), British botanist
- Ralph Blakelock (priest) (1803–1892), English archdeacon of Norfolk
