= William Pelham Burn =

William Pelham Burn (3 September 1859 – 2 September 1901) was Archdeacon of Norfolk from 1900 until his death.

== Early life ==
Pelham Burn was born in Paddington, London, the third son of Maj.-Gen. Henry Pelham Burn and Lucy Young Burn. He was educated at Pembroke College, Oxford.

== Career ==
After a curacy in Bodmin he was at St Mary Abbots until becoming the Vicar of St Peter Mancroft, Norwich in 1890.

== Personal life ==
He died of heart failure while skiing in Cortina d'Ampezzo, Italy, one day shy of his 42nd birthday.
