= Louis Baggott =

Anglican priest and author

Louis John Baggott (3 February 1891 – 9 April 1965) was an Anglican priest and author.

Baggott was educated at Queens' College, Cambridge and Ridley Hall, Cambridge. He was ordained deacon in 1915, and Priest in 1916. After a curacy at St Andrew, Drypool he was a chaplain to the Forces. When peace returned he was chaplain at the Tower of London. He was a curate at Bath Abbey from 1920 to 1923; vicar of Christ Church, Sefton Park from 1923 to 1928; rector of Newcastle-under-Lyme from 1928 to 1933; vicar of Clifton from 1933 to 1936; rural dean of Clifton from 1935 to 1936; vicar of Beverley Minster with Tickton from 1936 to 1942; and vicar of Great Yarmouth from 1942 to 1955. archdeacon of Norfolk and Residentiary Canon of Norwich Cathedral from 1955 until his retirement in 1962.
