= John Reynolds (priest) =

English Anglican priest

John Reynolds was an English Anglican priest in the 17th century.

Reynolds was born in Southampton and educated at Merton College, Oxford. He was incorporated at Cambridge in 1633. He was Archdeacon of Norwich from 1668 until 1676.
