= Thomas Muriell =

English Anglican priest

Thomas Muriell was an English Anglican priest in the 17th century.

Morton was educated at Pembroke College, Cambridge; and incorporated at Oxford in 1591.He held livings at Cold Norton, Hildersham, Soham and St Stephen Walbrook in the City of London. Murriell was Archdeacon of Norfolk from 1621 until 1629.
