= John Jeffery (priest) =

Anglican priest and author

John Jeffery, D.D. (20 December 1647; 1 April 1720) was an Anglican priest and author.

Jeffery was born in Ipswich. He was educated at Ipswich School and St Catharine's College, Cambridge. After a curacy at Dennington he was the Incumbent at St Peter Mancroft, Norwich. he also held livings at Kirton and Falkenham. He was Archdeacon of Norfolk from 1694 until his death.

He wrote

- 'Religion the Perfection of Man', 1689.
- 'Proposals to the reverend Clergy of the Archdeaconry of Norwich concerning the reformation of manners and promoting the interest of true religion and virtue', 1700
- 'Several Discourses', 1701–7
- 'The Religion of the Bible; or a Summary View of the Holy Scriptures, as the Records of True Religion', 1701
- 'Moral and Religious Aphorisms', 1703
- 'Select Discourses upon divers important subjects', 1710
- 'Christian Morals', 1716
- 'The True Notion of Peace in the Kingdom or Church of Christ', 1717
