= Geoffrey de Bocland =

English lawyer and churchman

Geoffrey de Bocland (fl. 1195-1224), was an English justice, lawyer and churchman.

== Life ==
He was a justiciar in the years 1195—7, 1201-4, and 1218, in all which years fines were levied before him on the feast of St. Margaret at Westminster. As early as the beginning of King John's reign he was connected with the exchequer, and as late as 1220 he was a justice itinerant in the county of Hereford.

His ecclesiastical career begins in 1200, when he was Archdeacon of Norfolk. Between 1200 and 1216 the churches of Tenham and Pageham were granted him, and in the latter year, 25 March, he is found dean of St. Martin's-le-Grand, preferment which he obtained from the crown. He was concerned in the First Barons' War in 1216, and twice in the year time and a safe-conduct were given him to appear before the king. In this year also his manor of Tacheworth in Herefordshire was forfeited and granted to Nicholas de Jelland.

On Henry III's accession he was restored to his judicial position, and in 1224 he was still alive. In that year a claim was made against him by the Archdeacon of Colchester for Newport, an important portion of his deanery, and he obtained a prohibition by writ against the archdeacon. Shortly before there had also been a dispute as to a vicarage in Colchester archdeaconry, that of Wytham, between Bocland and the canons of St. Martin's. The dean at last resigned whatever right he had to Eustace de Fauconbergh, Bishop of London, who granted it to the canons of St. Martin's, ordaining a perpetual vicarage there; and the grant was confirmed in 1222 under the seals of the bishop, dean, and chapter of St. Paul's, and dean and canons of St. Martin's. But by February 1231 he was dead, and had been succeeded by Walter de Maitland as dean of St. Martin's. Maitland was appointed 14 September 1225.

An elder brother of his, William de Bocland, married a daughter of Geoffrey de Saye, and sister-in-law of Geoffrey Fitz Peter, and on the latter's death in 1214 Geoffrey de Bocland was ordered to sell to the king, at the market price, the corn and stock on Fitz Peter's estate at Berkhampstead.

About the middle of the fourteenth century Maud, widow of William de Bocland, confirmed to the monastery of Walden the grant of the advowson of Essenham vicarage in the archdeaconry of Colchester.
