= John Berney =

John Berney (1698/9–1782) was an English Anglican priest and academic, Archdeacon of Norwich from 11 October 1744 until his death on 13 June 1782.

He was the son of Sir Richard Berney, 3rd Baronet, born at Kirby, Norfolk. He matriculated at Gonville and Caius College, Cambridge in 1717, aged 18. He graduated B.A. 1721 and M.A. 1724, and was a Fellow of the college from 1721 to 1737. He became D.D. in 1741.

Berney held livings at Hethersett, St Mary, Saxlingham and St Clement, Norwich.
