= Karen Hutchinson =

British Church of England priest

The Reverend Karen Hutchinson
- Lay Ministry Development Officer
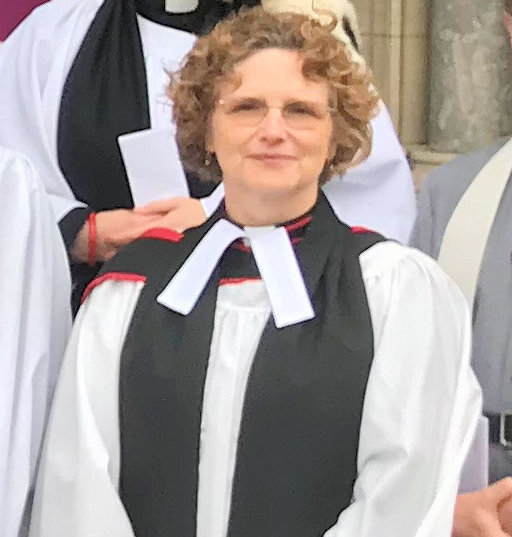
- Hutchinson in 2018
- Diocese: Diocese of Salisbury
- In office: 2022–present
- Other post: Archdeacon of Norwich (2016–2022)

Orders
- Ordination: 2001 (deacon); 2002 (priest)

Personal details
- Denomination: Anglican
- Education: Lady Margaret Hall, Oxford; Wycliffe Hall, Oxford

Karen Elizabeth Hutchinson (born 1964) is a British Church of England priest. She served as the Archdeacon of Norwich between 2016 and 2022.

Hutchinson read Mathematics at Lady Margaret Hall, Oxford. She qualified as a solicitor in 1989.

She was ordained in 2002. After a curacy in Alton, she held incumbencies in the Diocese of Guildford, first as vicar of Crondall and Ewshot from 2006 to 2012, and then as vicar of The Bourne and Tilford from 2012 to 2016. She was appointed Diocesan Advisor on Women's Ministry in 2010, and in 2016 she was appointed Archdeacon of Norwich. On 4 April 2022, she became Lay Ministry Development Officer in the Diocese of Salisbury.
