= Richard Stokes (priest) =

English Anglican priest

Richard Stokes was an English Anglican priest in the late 16th and early 17th centuries.

Stokes was educated at the University of Oxford. He held livings at Bishopsteignton, Bunwell and Banham. He was Archdeacon of Norfolk from 1587 until his death in 1619.
