= Henry Nevill (priest) =

Archdeacon of Norfolk

Henry Ralph Nevill (17 June 1821 – 17 October 1900) was Archdeacon of Norfolk from 1874 until his death.

Nevill was educated at Rugby and University College, Oxford. He was ordained in 1848. After a curacy in Great Yarmouth he was Vicar of St Mark, Norwich from 1857 to 1858; and then of Great Yarmouth from 1858 to 1873.
