= Oliver Dynham =

English cleric (died 1500)

Oliver Dynham B.A. (also Denham) (d. 1500) was a Canon of Windsor from 1480 to 1500.

== Career ==
He was appointed:

- Prebendary of Lichfield 1467
- Archdeacon of Norfolk 1488
- Archdeacon of Surrey 1500

He was appointed to the seventh stall in St George's Chapel, Windsor Castle in 1480 and held this until 1500. His will was made 22 April and proved 30 May 1500, naming his brother John, Lord Denham as his heir.

== See also ==
- Catholic Church in England
