= Steven Betts =

British Anglican priest

The Venerable Steven Betts
- Archdeacon of Norfolk
- Church: Church of England
- Diocese: Diocese of Norwich
- In office: 29 April 2012–present

Orders
- Ordination: 1990 (deacon); 1991 (priest)

Personal details
- Born: Steven James Betts; 22 November 1964 (age 61)
- Spouse: Sarah Taylor (m. 1992)
- Children: Three
- Education: Nottingham Bluecoat School
- Alma mater: University of York; Ripon College Cuddesdon; University of Oxford

Steven James Betts (born 22 November 1964) is a British Church of England priest. Since 2012, he has been the Archdeacon of Norfolk.

== Early life and education ==
Betts was born on 22 November 1964 to Ronald and Mary Betts. He grew up in Nottingham, Nottinghamshire. He was educated at the Nottingham Bluecoat School, then a grammar school. He studied chemistry at the University of York and graduated with a Bachelor of Science (BSc) degree in 1986.

In 1987, Betts entered Ripon College Cuddesdon to train for ordination. During this time, he also studied theology at the University of Oxford, completing a Certificate in Theology (CTh) in 1990.

== Ordained ministry ==
Betts was ordained in the Church of England as a deacon in 1990 and as a priest in 1991. From 1990 to 1994, he served his curacy at Holy Cross Church, Bearsted, Kent, in the Diocese of Canterbury.

In 1994, Betts moved to the Diocese of Norwich. From 1994 to 1997, he served as chaplain to Peter Nott, the then Bishop of Norwich. From 1997 to 2005, he was Vicar of the Church of St Margaret, Old Catton, Norfolk. Between 2001 and 2005, he was additionally the Rural Dean of Norwich North. From 2005 to 2012, he was the Bishop's Officer for Ordinands and Initial Training In that role, he had responsibility for all candidates for ordination from the Diocese of Norwich and for the training of the diocese's newly ordained clergy. He was made an honorary canon of Norwich Cathedral in 2008.

In 2012, Betts was appointed Archdeacon of Norfolk. On 29 April 2012, he was installed as archdeacon in Norwich Cathedral.

Betts was Chair of the House of Clergy of the Diocese of Norwich. He is one of four elected representatives from the Diocese of Norwich at the 2015-2020 General Synod of the Church of England.

On the 12 May 2026, it was announced that Betts will retire on 18 September 2026 with a service at Norwich Cathedral.

== Personal life ==
In 1992, Betts married Sarah Taylor. She is a clinical scientist. Together, they have three sons.
