= Robert Meiklejohn =

Former Archdeacon of Norwich (1889–1974)

Robert Meiklejohn (20 December 1889 – 7 July 1974) was Archdeacon of Norwich from 1954 to 1961.

Meiklejohn was educated at Haberdashers' Aske's and King's College, London. He was ordained in 1914. He was a Royal Naval chaplain from 1915 to 1919. He was vicar of Dorrington, Shropshire, from 1920 to 1925; a chaplain with the Missions to Seamen from 1926 to 1929; rector of Felbrigg with Metton from 1930 (and Sustead from 1947) to April 1961; and rural dean of Repps from 1945 to 1954. He retired as Archdeacon in mid-1961, and was made archdeacon emeritus around November that year.
