= Clifford Offer =

British Anglican priest

Clifford Jocelyn Offer (born 10 August 1943) is a British Anglican priest who was Archdeacon of Norwich from 1994 to 2008.

Offer was educated at The King's School, Canterbury, Exeter University and Westcott House, Cambridge. After a curacy at St Peter and St Paul, Bromley he was Team Vicar for Southampton City Centre from 1974 to 1983; He was Team Rector of Hitchin from 1983 to 1994.
