= William Bouverie (priest) =

Archdeacon of Norfolk (1797–1877)

William Arundell Bouverie (Marylebone 6 February 1797 - Denton, Norfolk 23 August 1877) was Archdeacon of Norfolk from 1850 until 1869.

Nevill was educated at Christ Church, Oxford. Later he was a Fellow at Merton. He was ordained in 1822. He held livings at Hambledon, Surrey, Holywell, Oxford, West Tytherley and Denton, Norfolk.
