= William Yonge (priest) =

William Yonge (20 June 1753 – 2 December 1845) was Archdeacon of Norwich from 1868 until his death

Yonge was born in Great Torrington and was educated at Jesus College, Cambridge and ordained in 1777. He held livings at Hilborough, Swaffham, Necton and Holme Hale. He died in Swaffham, aged 92.
