= Augustus Hopper =

English Anglician priest (1816–1878)

Augustus MacDonald Hopper (Belmont, County Durham 11 August 1816 – Starston 7 January 1878) was Archdeacon of Norwich from 1868 until his death.

Hopper was educated at Trinity College, Cambridge; and ordained in 1844. He was Rector of Starston from 1845 until his death.
