= Robert Hankinson (priest) =

English Anglican priest (1798–1868)

Robert Edwards Hankinson (1798–1868) was Archdeacon of Norwich from 1 July 1857 until his death.

Hankinson was educated at Trinity College, Cambridge. He held livings in Norwich, Hampstead, Kings Lynn, Halesworth and North Creake.

He died on 28 March 1868.
