= Peter Dawson (priest) =

Archdeacon of Norfolk

Peter Dawson (31 March 1929 – 6 January 2013) was Archdeacon of Norfolk from 1977 to 1993. accessed 23 Dec 2016

Dawson was educated at Manchester Grammar School. After National Service he continued his education at Keble College, Oxford and Ridley Hall, Cambridge. He was ordained in 1955. His first post was at curate at St Lawrence, Morden.He was Vicar of Barston from 1959 to 1963; Rector of St Clement, Higher Openshaw from 1963 to 1968. Returning to his first parish he was Rector of Morden from 1968 to 1977, and Rural Dean of Merton from 1975 until his appointment as Archdeacon.
