= George Gardiner (priest) =

English churchman

George Gardiner (1535?–1589) was an English churchman, Dean of Norwich from 1573.

== Life ==
The son of George Gardiner (abt 1509 – abt 1536) and Margaret Neville (abt 1515 – 15 October 1559), was born at Berwick-on-Tweed in 1537. He was a scholar of Christ's College, Cambridge, where he proceeded B.A. in 1554. He took the M.A. degree in 1558, having in the meantime become a fellow of Queens' College, Cambridge, an appointment of which he was deprived on 6 August 1561 for his continued absence from Cambridge.

In December 1560, supported by Robert Dudley, 1st Earl of Leicester who was always a firm friend, he was presented by the queen to the living of Chatton, Northumberland. In or about 1562 he became a minor canon of Norwich Cathedral, and was appointed minister to the church of St. Andrew in the city. He was promoted to be prebendary in 1565, and in 1570 was one of those who entered the choir of the cathedral and, among other acts, broke down the organ. In the previous year, at a metropolitan visitation, articles had been lodged against him charging him with having been ‘a man very unquiet, troublesome, and dissenting, setting debate between man and man.’ It was also said that in Queen Mary's time he had persecuted persons supposed to favour the gospel at the universities.

In 1571 Gardiner gave up his Norwich living on being instituted by the Merchant Taylors' Company to the rectory of St Martin Outwich, London, which he resigned in 1574, and in the same year he was collated to the living of Morley, Norfolk. In 1575 he became archdeacon of Norwich. He had represented to Leicester that the appointment had lapsed to the crown in consequence of a prolonged lawsuit between two candidates. The Bishop of Norwich, John Parkhurst, whose own candidate was one of the disputants, refused to recognise Gardiner as archdeacon; but in October 1573 the bishop promised to support him for the deanery, then vacant, if he would give up the archdeaconry. But Gardiner had already had resort to Leicester and Lord Burghley, and was nominated dean unconditionally, in spite of his bishop's opposition. Both Leicester and the queen ordered the bishop to desist, and ultimately Parkhurst and Gardiner were on good terms. Gardiner erected a monument to Parkhurst's memory in the cathedral.

In 1573 Gardiner was also appointed chaplain to the queen, and in the following year he was in attendance at court. In the same year he was on a commission of oyer and terminer for the county of Norfolk to examine into offences against the Act of Uniformity. In 1578 he was vicar-general of Norwich, apparently for only a short period. In 1575 he obtained the vicarage of Swaffham by gift of the queen, in 1579 the rectory of Haylesden, in 1580 that of Blofield, in 1583 that of Ashill, and in 1584 that of Forncett, all in Norfolk. He held also the rectory of West Stow, Suffolk.

Gardiner had duties too in London, and in February 1587 a formal complaint was made against him, among others, for neglecting to preach at St Paul's Cross according to a monition. As dean of Norwich he improved the revenues of the cathedral. Part of the church lands had been annexed by Sir Thomas Shirley and others, on various pretexts. Gardiner, by dint of his influence at court and many lawsuits, finally, in 1588, obtained a royal warrant ordering the patentees to surrender the church lands, for some compensation.

In the later years of his life Gardiner was much invalided by gout. He died about June 1589, and was buried in the south aisle of his cathedral, where was his tomb, with a Latin inscription. A number of his letter are printed in John Strype's Annals.

Gardiner was married to Dorothy Constable (abt 1536 - abt 1589) around the year 1564. He had at least two children with her:

Sir Thomas Gardiner (abt 1565 - abt 1635) who married Elizabeth White and had issue.

Lionel Gardiner (abt 1573 - abt 1610) who married Elizabeth Woodhouse and had issue.

== Notes ==
Attribution

This article incorporates text from a publication now in the public domain: "Gardiner, George". Dictionary of National Biography. London: Smith, Elder & Co. 1885–1900.
