= Matthew Postlethwayte =

18th-century Archdeacon of Norwich

Matthew Postlethwayte (1679–1745) was Archdeacon of Norwich from 1742 until 1744.

A Cumbrian, Postlethwayte was educated at St Paul's and Corpus Christi College, Cambridge. He was ordained on 22 December 1706. He held incumbencies at Needham, Shottesham, Denton and Redenhall.

He died on 27 June 1745.
