= George MacDermott =

English Anglican priest

George Martius MacDermott (28 April 1863 – 30 March 1939) was an English Anglican priest who served as Archdeacon of Norfolk from 1918 to 1920 and Archdeacon of Norwich from 1921 to 1938.

MacDermott studied theology at Durham University, where he matriculated as a member of Hatfield Hall. He was elected captain of the college boat club in October 1888. He was ordained in 1889. He continued his studies at Durham, going on to earn a Bachelor of Arts degree in 1891.

After curacies at Hyde, Slaugham, Banham and Hilgay, MacDermott became rector of Eccles in 1900. He served there until 1906, when he became vicar of North Walsham with Antingham. From 1909 to 1921 he was rector of Little Ellingham with Great Ellingham.

MacDermott died in Norwich on 30 March 1939. His funeral was held at Slaugham, Sussex.
