= Edward Reynolds (cricketer) =

English clergyman, schoolmaster, and sportsman

Edward Morris Reynolds (30 August 1830 – 3 April 1908) was an English schoolmaster, clergyman and all-round sportsman who played first-class cricket for Cambridge University. He was born in Clapham, then in Surrey, and died at Ambleside, then within Westmorland.

Reynolds was educated at the Liverpool Institute and at Emmanuel College, Cambridge. As a cricketer, he played as a lower middle order batsman and a bowler for Liverpool Cricket Club in non-first-class matches from 1848; neither his bowling nor his batting style are known. At Cambridge, he played in four first-class matches, and two of them were the University Matches of 1853 and 1854 against Oxford University; Oxford won both of those games convincingly.

Reynolds graduated from Cambridge University in 1855 with a Bachelor of Arts degree. He was ordained as a deacon in the Church of England and served as curate of Trinity Church, Stockton-on-Tees from 1855 to 1862. From 1863 to 1876, Reynolds held various posts as a schoolmaster at St Peter's College, Radley, Clifton College and Haileybury College. He then retired to the Lake District where he was Master of Foxhounds of the Coniston pack and had a reputation for other sports, including sailing and ice-skating; his merits in these and more clerical pursuits were the subject of some ill-tempered correspondence in the Yorkshire Post after his death in 1908.
