= Edward Reynolds (priest) =

English Anglican priest

Edward Reynolds was an English Anglican priest in the 17th century.

The son of Bishop Edward Reynolds, he was educated at Magdalen College, Oxford. He became the Rector of St Peter's Church, Northampton. He was Archdeacon of Norfolk from 1661 until his death on 28 June 1698.
