= Frederick Westcott =

British Anglican clergyman (1857–1918)

Frederick Brooke Westcott, DD (16 December 1857 in Harrow – 24 February 1918 in Norwich) was Archdeacon of Norwich from 1910 until his death.

The son of Brooke Foss Westcott, Bishop of Durham from 1890 until 1901, he was educated at Cheltenham College and Trinity College, Cambridge. He was an Assistant Master at Rugby School from 1884 to 1892; an Honorary Chaplain to Queen Victoria; and Headmaster of Sherborne School from 1892 until his appointment as Archdeacon.
