= Sidney Pelham =

English cricketer

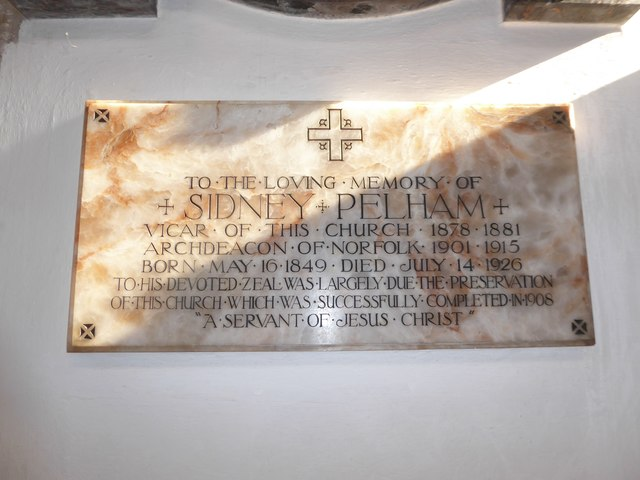
Memorial at St Peter Mancroft

Sidney Pelham (16 May 1849 – 14 July 1926) was an English first-class cricketer active in 1871 and 1872 who played for Oxford University. He became Archdeacon of Norfolk from 1901 until 1916. Pelham was born in Brighton and died in Norwich.

Playing cricket at Oxford, Pelham appeared in seven first-class matches as a slow roundarm bowler who took 21 wickets with a best return of six for 51. He was a lower order right-handed batsman, scoring only 24 runs and he held six catches. In 1868, he had captained the team at Harrow.

The son of John Pelham, Bishop of Norwich from 1857 to 1893, he was educated at Harrow and Magdalen College, Oxford. He was ordained Deacon in 1873; and Priest in 1874. He served curacies at Stalbridge and Redenhall. He was Vicar of St Peter Mancroft from 1879 to 1881; then Chaplain to successive Bishops of Norwich from 1891 until his appointment as Archdeacon.
