= Frobury, Hampshire =

Frobury is the western part of the modern parish of Kingsclere, Hampshire.

Frobury was in the possession of Ranulf de Broch [Broc] (died 1179 or 1187), usher and chief marshal of the household to Henry II, and his widow (when assigned in dower?), Damietta de Gorron (died 1204), the lady of Chetton, Eudon and Berwick (co. Salop). Their daughter Edelina de Broch (died 1220) was returned by the Testa de Nevill as 'holding £6 worth of land in the vill of Frobury of the king in chief by the serjeanty of guarding the king's door'. Between 1217 and 1223, a grant of money was made by Edelina to the Canons of the Church of Saint John the Baptist, Sandleford of 40s. and 8d. from her inheritance in Frollebire [Frobury] for the maintenance of a Canon Chantry Priest, for the souls of herself, her parents Randulf de Broch [Broc] and Damietta de Gorron, and her husband, Stephen de Turneham (died 1214).

The widow Edelina left by her husband five daughters and co-heirs, Maud or Mabel the wife of Thomas de Bavelingham, Alice the wife of Adam de Bending, Eleanor who married Roger de Leyburn, Eleanor who married Ralph Fitz Bernard, and Beatrice the wife of Ralph de Fay (1), Hugh de Neville (2) and Hugh de Plessetis (3).

The grant to Sandleford was confirmed by Edelina's daughter Beatrice de Fay (died before 1245), widow of Ralph de Fay, (she married secondly Hugh de Neville (died 1234) was the Chief Forester under the kings Richard I, John, and Henry III of England), to the Church of Saint John the Baptist, Sandleford, and the Canons, of rents etc., in Frollebire [Frobury], which Edelina de Broc, her mother gave them. Her third husband Hugh de Plessetis (de Playz) had Beatrice excommunicated circa 1241 because she would not divorce him. Frobury fell as her share to Beatrice, probably the eldest daughter, and passed from her to her daughter Philippa the wife of William de Nevill, who in the middle of the 13th century was stated to be holding 'half a hide [circa 50 acres] in Frobury of the old enfeoffment by the serjeanty of guarding the door of the queen's chamber'. In 1249 Philippa de Nevill granted Frobury in free marriage to William de Wintershull [Wintershill], who had married her daughter Beatrice, and from this date Frobury continued in the Wintershull family for about two centuries. William de Wintershull obtained licence to impark his wood of Frobury [Frobury park copse], which covered an area of 10 acres, in 1260, and died seised of the manor of Frobury in 1287. In circa 1546 William and Joan Unwin sold the manor to William Paulet, Lord St. John.

'On 21 October 1644 Charles I intending to relieve Basing House marched hither from Whitchurch, but finding the enemy so greatly his superior in cavalry, after one night's halt he continued his march towards Newbury', so wrote the Victoria County History in 1911. According to Captain Richard Symonds, the author of Diary of the Marches of the Royal Army, (published 1869, page 142), the house at which the king spent the night was Frobury Manor House, about a mile northwest of the town, his host being Robert Tower. Appropriately, Basing House and Frobury manor both belonged at that time to John Paulet, 5th Marquess of Winchester.
