= Thomas de Skerning (Scarning) =

English priest

Thomas de Scerning (de Skarning) was an English priest in the late 13th and early 14th centuries.

He was Archdeacon of Norwich from 1273 to 1289, appointed by his kinsman Roger de Skerning, Bishop of Norwich from 1266 to 1278. Handbook of British Chronology (Third revised ed.). Fryde, E. B.; Greenway, D. E.; Porter, S.; Roy, I. p261 Cambridge: Cambridge University Press (CUP); 1996

He went on to be Archdeacon of Suffolk from 1289 to 1296; and Archdeacon of Surrey from 1296 to 1301. He also held livings at Buriton, Settrington and Waxham.
