= David Hayden (priest) =

David Frank Hayden (born 25 January 1947) was Archdeacon of Norfolk from 2002 until 2012.

Hayden was educated at Tyndale Hall, Bristol and was ordained Deacon in 1971; and Priest in 1972. He served curacies at Silverhill and Galleywood Common. He was Rector of Redgrave, Suffolk cum Botesdale with Rickinghall from 1979 to 1984; Rural Dean of Hartismere from 1981 to 1984; Vicar of Cromer; and Rural Dean of Repps from 1995 to 2002.
