= Arthur James Moore =

American bishop

Arthur James Moore (December 26, 1888 – June 30, 1974) was an American bishop of the Methodist Episcopal Church, South (MECS), the Methodist Church, and the United Methodist Church, elected in 1930.

== Birth and family ==
Arthur was born December 26, 1888, in Waycross, Georgia, the son of John Spencer and Emma Victoria (née Cason) Moore. Arthur was of Irish ancestry. His great grandfather came to North Carolina and his grandfather moved to Georgia. Arthur's grandfather later died in the Battle of Gaines' Mill in 1862.

Arthur married Martha "Mattie" T. McDonald April 26, 1906. They had children William Harry, Wilbur Wardlaw, Alice Evelyn Means, Arthur James Jr., and Dorothy Emma. Mattie died in 1964.

== Education and conversion to Christ ==
Arthur Sr studied at Emory College in Oxford, Georgia, from 1909 until 1911. He did not complete an earned degree. Instead, he was converted to Christ in his twenty-first year and began to preach at once! He subsequently was awarded several honorary degrees, including the degree of D.D. from Asbury College, Wilmore, Kentucky (1922), Central College, Fayette, Missouri (1924), and Emory University (1934); and the degree of LL.D. from Southwestern University, Georgetown, Texas (1935), Randolph-Macon College (1939), Florida Southern College (1942), and Mercer University (1968).

== Ordained ministry ==
Arthur experienced a "drastic" conversion to Christ in his twenty-first year and began to preach at once. He joined the South Georgia Annual Conference in 1909. He served various churches as pastor during 1909-20. He also served as a roving evangelist, and was a most eloquent speaker.

In 1920, the Rev. Moore was appointed to the Travis Park Methodist Church in San Antonio, Texas, serving there until 1926. He then was appointed pastor of First Methodist Church, Birmingham, Alabama.

== Honors ==
The Rev. Moore was honored by Asbury College with the degree Doctor of Divinity in 1922. Central College did the same in 1924, as did Emory University (D.D., 1934). Asbury College also awarded the LL.D. in 1930. Southwestern University did the same in 1935, Randolph-Macon College in 1939, and Florida Southern College in 1941. He also received an honorary degree from Wesleyan College.

The Rev. Moore was a member of Phi Beta Kappa. He was a 32° Mason and a Knights Templar.

== Episcopal ministry ==
The Rev. Dr. Arthur James Moore was elected and consecrated to the episcopacy of the Methodist Episcopal Church, South at the 1930 General Conference of that denomination. Bishop Moore was assigned responsibility for all missionary activities of the MECS in China, Japan, Czechoslovakia, Belgium, Belgian Congo, Poland and Korea, until 1940. In 1940 he was assigned the Atlanta episcopal area of the (newly reunited) Methodist Church. His address was 63 Auburn Ave., N.E., Atlanta.

Bishop Moore also served as president of Wesleyan College in Macon, Georgia, in 1941, and as chairman of the board. He was a member of the Committee on Interdenominational Relations and Church Union of the MECS (1934–39), and President of the Board of Missions and Church Extension of The Methodist Church. He was also the organizer and first president of the Board of Evangelism of The Methodist Church.

Bishop Moore died June 30, 1974.

== Selected writings ==
- Address: The Holy Spirit, Atlanta, Sixth Ecumenical Conference, 1931.
- Bishop to All Peoples, 1973.
- Central Certainties (a collection of sermons), 1942.
- Christ After Chaos, 1944.
- Christ and Our Country, 1945.
- The Sound of Trumpets (a collection of sermons), 1934.

== See also ==
- List of bishops of the United Methodist Church
