= Arthur Moore (priest) =

Arthur Crompton Moore (3 October 1877 – 5 October 1954) was Archdeacon of Norfolk from 1934 until his death.

Moore was educated at Liverpool College, Clare College, Cambridge and Wycliffe Hall, Oxford. He served curacies in Knutsford, Seville, Huddersfield and Stockport. He held incumbencies at Potter Heigham, Halesworth and Hereford.

He died on 5 October 1954.
