= Philip Jennings (priest) =

Protestant priest

Philip Jennings (b. Wantage 23 September 1783 – d. Hampstead 20 December 1849) was Archdeacon of Norfolk from 13 August 1847 until his death.

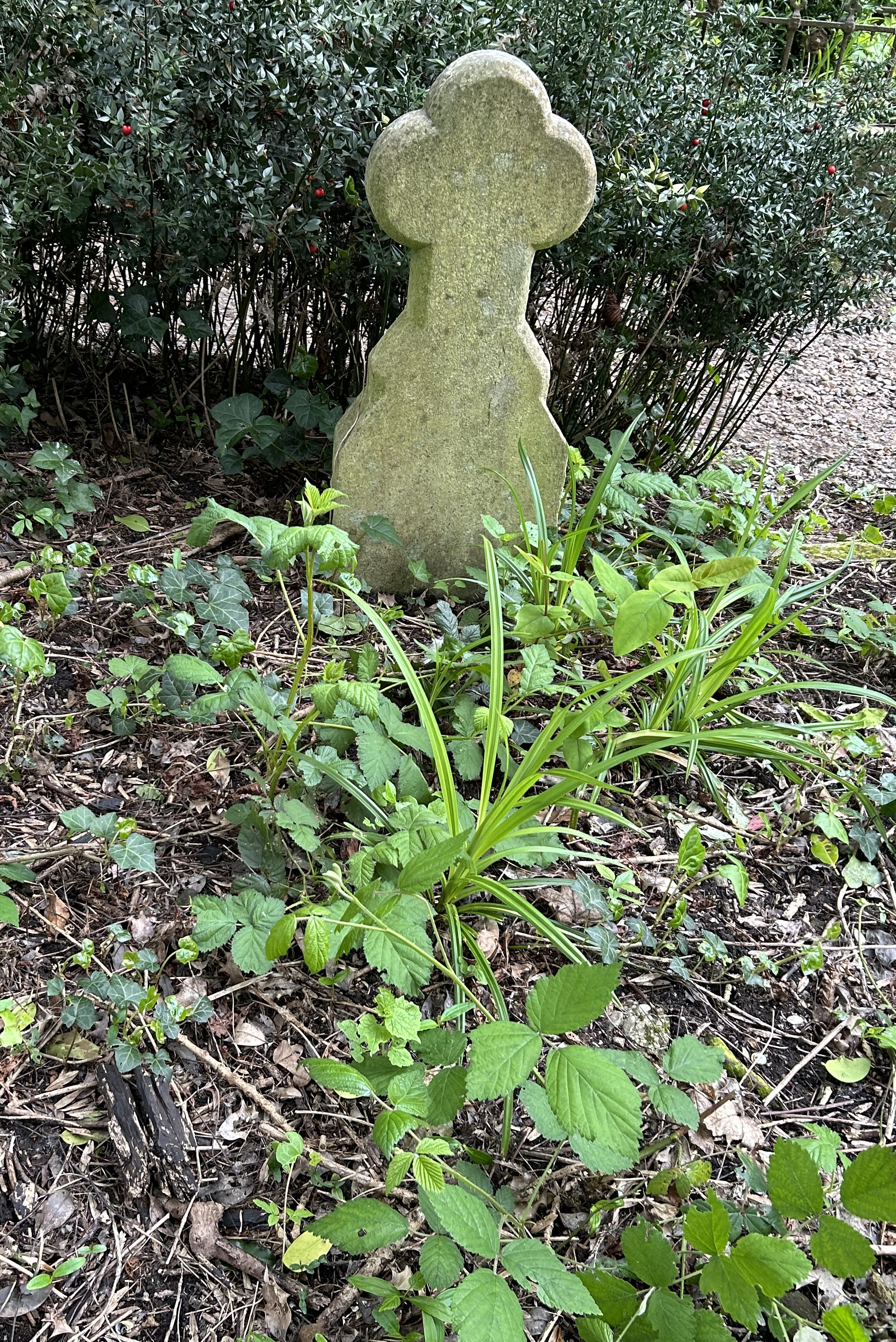
Grave of Philip Jennings in Highgate Cemetery

Jennings was educated at Worcester College, Oxford, matriculating in 1802, and graduating B.A. in 1806, M.A. in 1809. He was for many years the Minister of St James's Chapel, Marylebone. In 1847 he became Rector of Coston.

He died on 20 December 1849 at Hampstead and was buried on the west side of Highgate Cemetery.
