= Robert Honiwood =

English canon

Robert Honiwood LL.D. (died 22 January 1523) was a Canon of Windsor from 1504 to 1523

== Career ==
He was appointed:

- Archdeacon of Norwich 1497
- Chancellor of Norwich 1499
- Archdeacon of Taunton 1509
- Prebendary of Lichfield 1512

He was appointed to the second stall in St George's Chapel, Windsor Castle in 1504, and held the stall until 1523.
