= Ralph Blakelock (priest) =

Archdeacon of Norfolk

Ralph Blakelock (born Leeds 1803 – died Gimingham 1892) was Archdeacon of Norfolk from 1869 until 1874.

Nevill was educated at Giggleswick School and St Catharine's College, Cambridge. He was ordained in 1832 and was Rector of Gimingham from 1833 until his death on 1 March 1892.
