= Archdeacon of Norfolk =

Church of England ecclesiastical office

The Archdeacon of Norfolk is a senior ecclesiastical officer in the Church of England Diocese of Norwich, who exercises supervision of clergy and responsibility for church buildings within the geographical area of their archdeaconry.

The current archdeacon is Steven Betts who was appointed in 2012.

== History ==
The ancient Archdeaconry of Norfolk has been an ecclesiastical jurisdiction within the Diocese of Norwich since its creation around 1100 – at which time the first archdeacons were being appointed across the nation.

== List of archdeacons ==
=== High Medieval ===
- bef. 1127–aft. 1166: Roger (Note: These archdeacons are not recorded with the title Archdeacon of Norfolk, but their territory can be deduced from the churches with which records connect them and/or the contemporaries with whom they are recorded.)
- bef. 1174–aft. 1181: Steingrim
- bef. 1196–aft. 1197: John
- bef. 1198–aft. 1218: Geoffrey de Bocland
- bef. 1227–1228 (res.): Martin of Pattishall (afterwards Dean of St Paul's, 1228)
- bef. 1230–aft. 1232: Robert de Bilneia
- bef. 1233–aft. 1233: R-
- bef. 1236–1237: Ralph de Blonvilla (de Blundeville)
- 1237: Thomas de Lecche
- 1237–bef. 1245: Ralph de Blonvilla (again)
- bef. 1239–1240: Simon the Norman
- bef. 1239–1257 (res.): Walter de Salerne/de Saleron alias of London (also Dean of St Paul's from 1254)
- 9 July 1257–aft. 1264: Nicholas de Plimpton
- bef. 1267–aft. 1292: Alan de Freston

=== Late Medieval ===
- bef. 1325–aft. 1325: R. de S. (possibly Richard de Stanhowe)
- bef. 1326–bef. 1326: Thomas de Kerdeston
- 25 July 1326–bef. 1327 (res.): William de Herlaston
- bef. 1327–bef. 1335 (res.): Adam de Ayremynne
- 16 April 1335–bef. 1335: John Newland
- 25 June 1335–bef. 1359 (d.): Robert de Usflet
- 4 March–22 June 1351 (rev.): John de Harewell
- 22 May 1359–bef. 1374 (d.): William de Blythe
- 20 June 1359–September 1359 (rev.): Richard de Ravenser
- 13 March 1374 – 1375 (dep.): Robert de Prees/Prots
- 28 March 1375–bef. 1385 (res.): John de Freton
- 18 August 1385 – 1390 (res.): Richard de Medeford/Mitford
- Period of dispute:
  - 11 April 1390–bef. 1398 (deprived): John de Middleton
  - 1392 (claim): Robert de Prees/Prots (again)
  - bef. 1391–aft. 1394: James Dardani
  - 20 November 1398 – 1399 (rev.): Ralph Selby
  - 1399–1399 (res.): John de Middleton (again)
- 29 October 1399 – 1406 (res.): Thomas Langley
- 2 September 1406–bef. 1408 (res.): Richard Dereham
- 30 October 1408–bef. 1412 (res.): John Macworth
- 1 July 1412–bef. 1418 (res.): Richard Dereham (again)
- 18 February 1418 – 1419 (res.): Philip Morgan
- 21 December 1419–bef. 1448 (d.): William Sponne
- 14 February 1449 – 1459 (res.): John Hales
- 23 November 1459 – 3 January 1477 (exch.): Thomas Marke
- 3 January 1477 – 1478 (res.): John Morton
- 27 February 1479 – 1500 (d.): Oliver Dynham
- 7 November 1500–bef. 1522 (d.): Christopher Urswick, Dean of Windsor until 1505 and Rector of Hackney from 1502 (also Archdeacon of Wilts; Archdeacon of Richmond until 1500 and Archdeacon of Oxford from 1504)
- 6 April 1522–aft. 1527 (res.): William Stillington
- bef. 1529–bef. 1530 (res.): Thomas Wynter (also Dean of Wells {until June 1529}, Archdeacon of York and Archdeacon of Richmond {until 1529})
- 1 March 1530 – 1531 (res.): Stephen Gardiner
- 2 April 1531 – 1547 (d.): William Newton

=== Early modern ===
- 1548–?: Alexander Carew
- 1552–aft. 1567: Matthew Carew (deprived)
- 6 April 1587–bef. 1619 (d.): Richard Stokes
- 18 December 1619–bef. 1621 (d.): Francis Mason
- 28 December 1621–bef. 1629 (d.): Thomas Muriell
- 18 October 1629–?: Writhlington White
- 23 September 1631–bef. 1657 (d.): Robert White
- 24 August 1660 – 15 January 1661 (d.): Philip Tenison
- 15 February 1661 – 28 June 1698 (d.): Edward Reynolds
- 20 July 1698 – 1708 (res.): Charles Trimnell
- 11 March 1708 – 1721 (res.): Robert Cannon (afterwards Dean of Lincoln)
- 7 December 1721 – 1732 (res.): Thomas Tanner
- 17 June 1732 – 1733 (res.): John Baron (afterwards Dean of Norwich)
- 22 November 1734 – 1756 (d.): Samuel Salter
- 16 September 1756 – 14 May 1768 (d.): Samuel Stedman
- 28 May 1768 – 1 November 1797 (d.): Thomas Warburton
- 1 December 1797 – 31 January 1847 (d.): John Oldershaw
- 13 August 1847 – 20 December 1849 (d.): Philip Jennings
- 20 December 1850–bef. 1869 (res.): William Bouverie

=== Late modern ===
- 1869–1874 (res.): Ralph Blakelock (died 1 March 1882)
- 1874–17 October 1900 (d.): Henry Nevill
- 1900–1901 (d.): William Pelham-Burn
- 1901–1916 (ret.): Sidney Pelham
- 1916–1918 (res.): Charles Lisle Carr
- 1918–1920 (res.): George MacDermott
- 1920–1934 (ret.): Augustus Buckland
- 1934–5 October 1954 (d.): Arthur Moore
- 1955–1962 (ret.): Louis Baggott (afterwards archdeacon emeritus)
- 1962–13 August 1976 (d.): Eric Cordingly (also Bishop suffragan of Thetford from 1963)
- 1977–1993 (ret.): Peter Dawson (afterwards archdeacon emeritus)
- 1993–2002 (ret.): Michael Handley (afterwards archdeacon emeritus)
- 2002–28 February 2012 (ret.): David Hayden
- 29 April 2012–present: Steven Betts

== Sources ==
- Greenaway, Diana E. (1971), Fasti Ecclesiae Anglicanae 1066–1300, vol. 2, pp. 64–67
- Jones, B. (1963), Fasti Ecclesiae Anglicanae 1300–1541, vol. 4, pp. 28–30
- Horn, Joyce M. (1992), Fasti Ecclesiae Anglicanae 1541–1857, vol. 7, pp. 46–47
