= Fairstead, Norfolk =

Suburb in King's Lynn, Norfolk, UK

Coordinates: 52.753°N 0.436°E

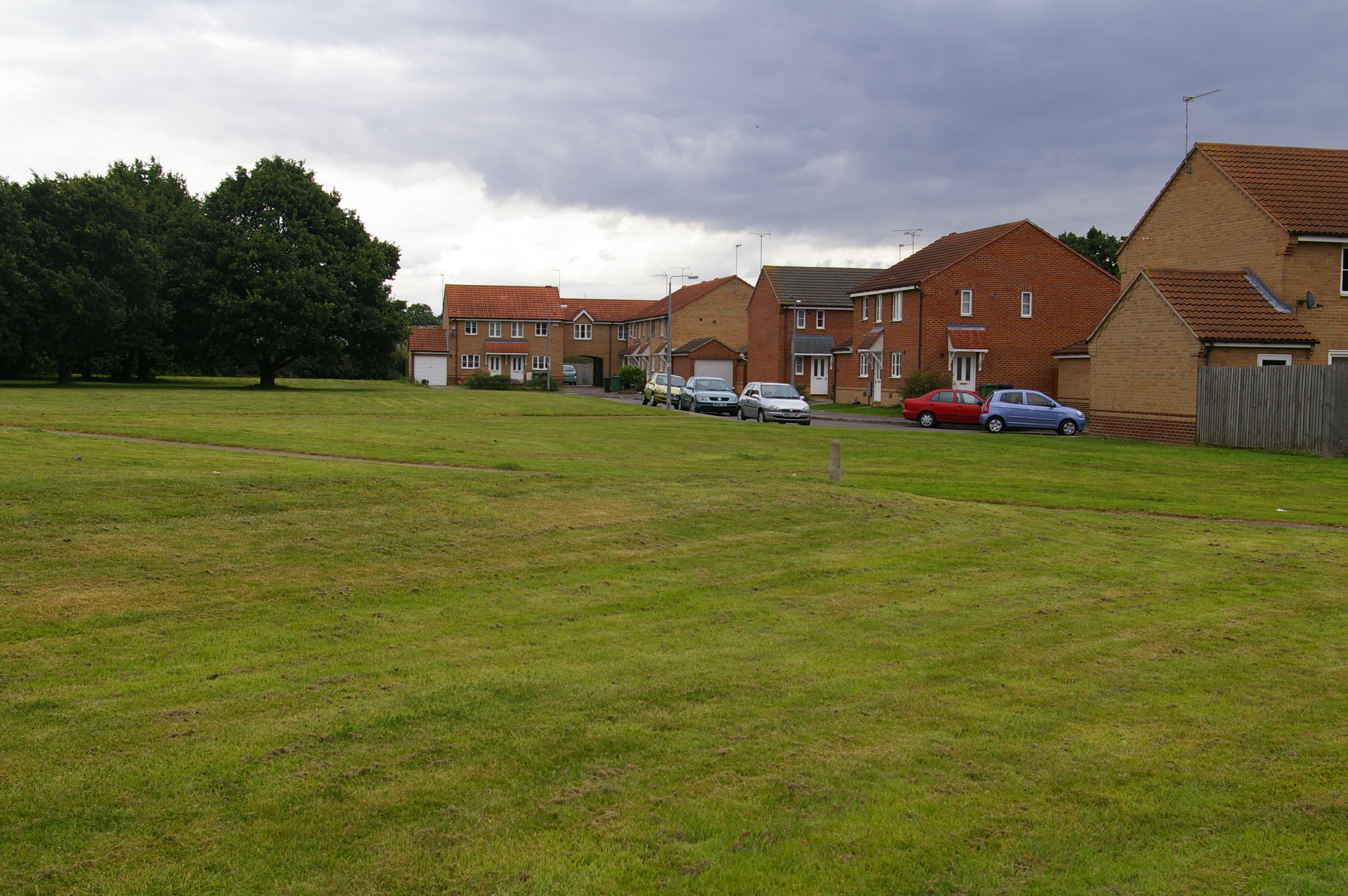
Green space in Fairstead

The Fairstead Estate is a suburb of King's Lynn, Norfolk, England. The population of the Fairstead ward of King's Lynn and West Norfolk borough at the 2011 Census was 6,479.

== Facilities ==
Fairstead has two schools: Fairstead Community Primary School, a large primary school, and Churchill Park School, which was completed in 2010 and is a merger of Alderman Jackson and Ethel Tipple Schools.

Fairstead has an area called Centre Point, with a doctor's surgery, shops and a community centre. At the other end of the estate there is a convenience store.
