= Eccles, Norfolk =

Eccles, Norfolk may refer to:

- Eccles on Sea, North Norfolk
- Eccles Road railway station, Breckland
