= Brinton, Norfolk =

Village in Norfolk, England

Coordinates: 52.880°N 1.028°E

Brinton
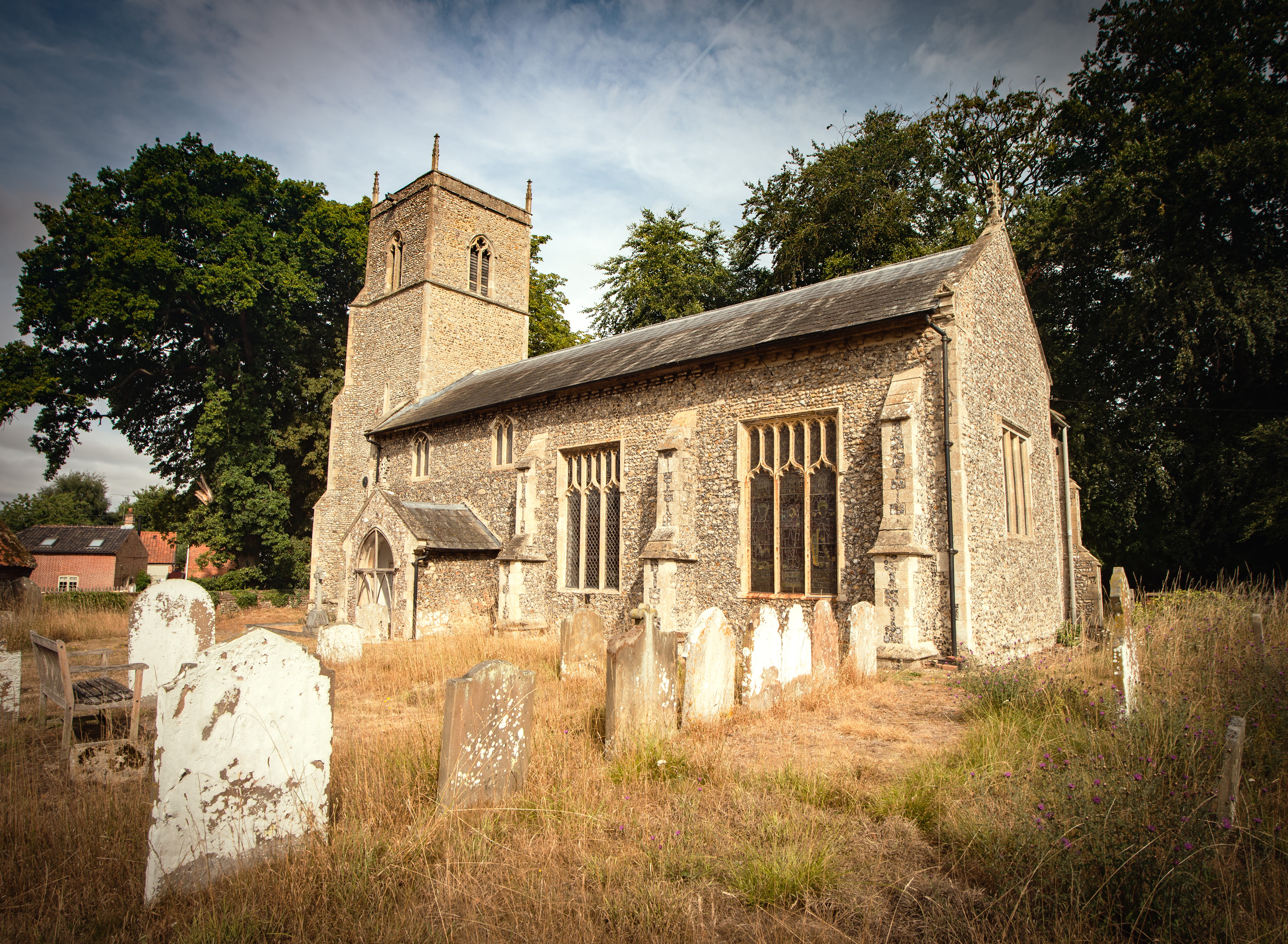
- St. Andrew's Church

- Location within Norfolk
- Area: 6.12 km^{2} (2.36 sq mi)
- Population: 178 (Parish, 2021)
  - Density: 29/km^{2} (75/sq mi)
- OS grid reference: TG030350
  - London: 125 miles (201 km)
- Civil parish: Brinton
- District: North Norfolk
- Shire county: Norfolk
- Region: East
- Country: England
- Sovereign state: United Kingdom
- Post town: MELTON CONSTABLE
- Postcode district: NR24
- Dialling code: 01263
- Police: Norfolk
- Fire: Norfolk
- Ambulance: East of England
- UK Parliament: North Norfolk

Brinton is a village and a civil parish in the English county of Norfolk. It is 3 miles (4.8 km) south-west of Holt and 21 miles (34 km) north-west of Norwich. The modern parish includes the village of Sharrington.

== History ==
In the Domesday Book, Brinton is recorded as a settlement of 12 households in the hundred of Holt and formed part of the estates of William de Beaufeu.

Brinton Hall was built in 1822, on earlier foundations, in the Greek Revival style. The hall is surrounded by gardens and parkland.

In 1941, a Heinkel 111 bomber crashed close to the village. Three out of four of the crew escaped but were later captured on nearby Salthouse Heath.

== Geography ==
At the 2021 census, Brinton Parish has a population of 178 people, a slight decrease from the 222 people recorded in the 2011 census.

The A148 road, between King's Lynn and Cromer, runs through the parish. The nearest railway station is at Sheringham for the Bittern Line which runs between Sheringham, Cromer and Norwich. The nearest airport is Norwich International Airport.

== St. Andrew's Church ==
St Andrew's parish church dates from the 14th century. The church was re-roofed in the 16th century and has carved pews from this period. It also has stained-glass designed by A. L. Moore, Franz Mayer & Co. and Paul Quail.

== Notable people ==
- William Kendall (1621–1686) merchant, Virginia planter and politician, born in Brinton.
- John Astley (1735–1803) clergyman and Rector of Brinton, 1758-1803.
- William Pilch (1820–1882) Norfolk and Kent cricketer, born in Brinton.
- Cuthbert Arthur Brereton (1850–1910) engineer, born in Brinton.
- Peter Coke (1913–2008) actor, artist and playwright, died in Brinton parish.
