= Hope (Burne-Jones) =

1896 oil painting by Edward Burne-Jones

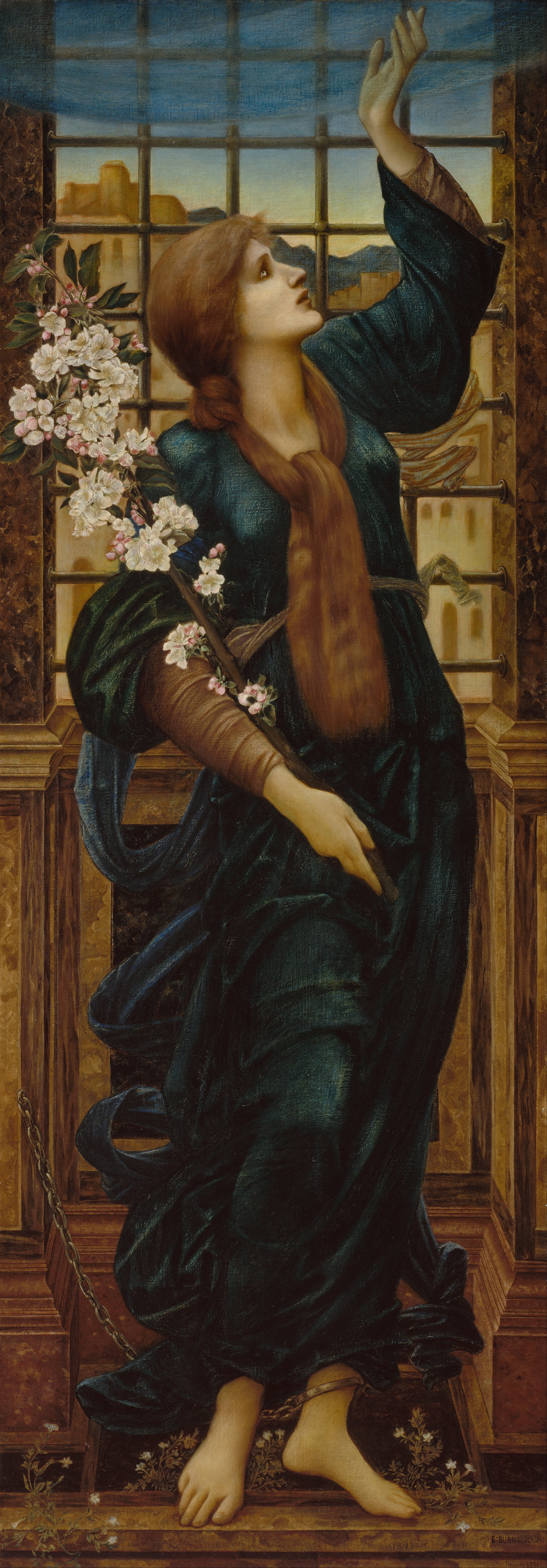
- Artist: Edward Burne-Jones
- Year: 1896
- Type: oil painting
- Dimensions: 179 cm × 63.5 cm (70 in × 25.0 in)
- Location: Museum of Fine Arts, Boston

Hope is a late oil painting by the Pre-Raphaelite artist Edward Burne-Jones. It was painted on commission for Mrs. George Marston Whitin of Whitinsville, Massachusetts in 1896.

Mrs. Whitin originally requested a painting of a dancing figure, but Burne-Jones, devastated by the recent death of his long-time friend and partner William Morris, struggled with the work and wrote to ask if a painting of Hope would be an acceptable alternative. The result was an allegory in the Renaissance fashion, with the bound personification of Hope reaching skyward despite her bars and the chain around her ankle. In her hand she holds a sprig of apple blossom that symbolised hope.

The painting is based on an 1871 watercolour by Burne-Jones. The watercolour is likely painted over the original cartoon for one of a set of stained glass designs of the Christian virtues Faith, Hope, and Charity created by Burne-Jones for Morris, Marshall, Faulknor and Company. A three-light window based on Burne-Jones's designs was commissioned for the nave of Christ Church Cathedral, Oxford. The stained glass designs were also used for a set of windows at St Margaret's Church, Hopton-on-Sea, Norfolk and St Martin's Church, Brampton, Cumbria.

The oil painting of Hope was donated to the Museum of Fine Arts, Boston by Mrs. Whitin's daughters in her memory.

== Other versions ==
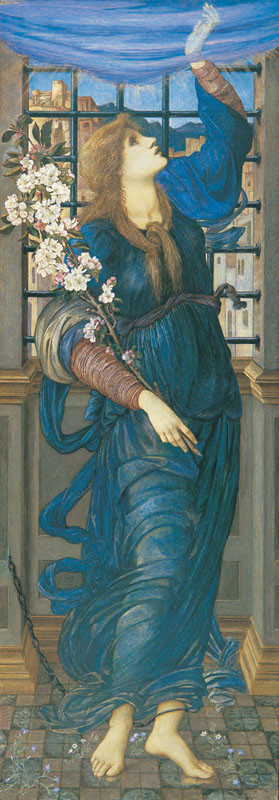
Watercolour, 1871, Dunedin Public Art Gallery

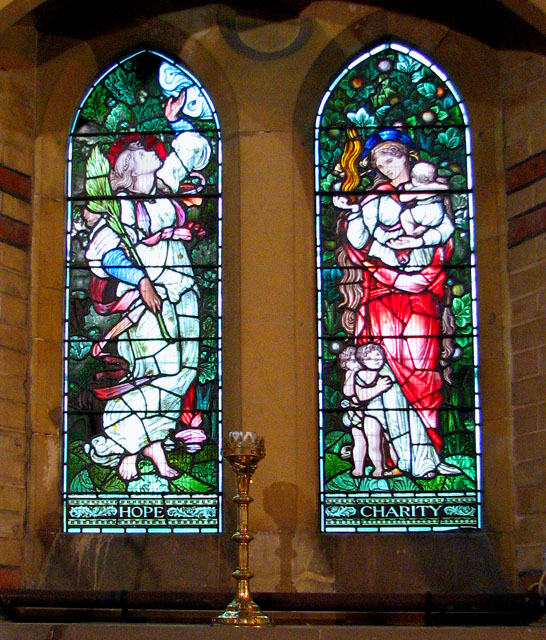
Stained glass window (left), St Margaret's Church, Hopton-on-Sea

== See also ==
- List of paintings by Edward Burne-Jones
- Hope, an oil painting by the English painter George Frederic Watts (1886)
