= Make Mine Mink =

1960 British film by Robert Asher

- Directed by: Robert Asher
- Written by: Michael Pertwee; Peter Blackmore
- Based on: the play Breath of Spring by Peter Coke
- Produced by: Hugh Stewart
- Starring: Terry-Thomas; Athene Seyler; Hattie Jacques; Billie Whitelaw
- Cinematography: Reginald Wyer
- Edited by: Roger Cherrill
- Music by: Philip Green
- Production company: Rank Organisation Film Productions
- Distributed by: J. Arthur Rank Film Distributors (UK); Continential Distribution (US)
- Release date: 9 August 1960 (London)
- Running time: 101 minutes
- Country: United Kingdom
- Language: English
- Budget: £95,000

Make Mine Mink is a 1960 British comedy farce film directed by Robert Asher and featuring Terry-Thomas, Athene Seyler, Hattie Jacques and Billie Whitelaw. It was based on the 1958 play Breath of Spring by Peter Coke, and its sequels.

The screenplay concerns a group of eccentric misfits who go on a crime spree, stealing mink coats for charity in a Robin Hood-style gang.

The composing team of Kander and Ebb saw the film and wanted to adapt it into a musical. However legal complications meant they had to adapt the original play for what became 70, Girls, 70.

== Plot ==
A group of lodgers – Major Rayne, Nanette ("Nan") and "Pinkie" Pinkerton – staying at the Kensington apartment of Dame Beatrice, an elderly philanthropist, are bored with their humdrum, restricted lives. Lily, Dame Bea's beautiful young housekeeper, overhears an argument between their neighbours, the Spanagers. When Mrs. Spanager rejects her husband's gift of a mink coat due to his lies about his business trip, he pretends to throw the coat off their balcony, but actually just hides it. Lily snags it and gives it to her employer to show her gratitude for hiring her despite her criminal record. Dame Beatrice is at first delighted, but then assumes Lily has stolen it. She and the lodgers concoct a scheme to return the fur coat before its owners realize its absence. Despite several comical mishaps, the gang manage to do so using a plan drawn up by the retired Major. The four are so exhilarated by their escapade, they decide to steal more furs, presuming that intricacies of theft should prove no more difficult than was the return of the Spanagers' fur, with all the proceeds of their exploits being donated to charity.

Their attempt to rob Madame Spolinski's boutique goes somewhat awry, due to Pinkie's ineptitude, but they still manage to get away with a fur coat. However, they have not considered how to dispose of their loot. The Major, pretending he is writing a book on delinquency, gets Lily to direct him to a shady café in Limehouse in search of a fence. It turns out that Lily is behind the times; it is now run by the Salvation Army. Meanwhile, they have to hide their activities from Lily, who is now dating policeman Jim Benham.

When they catch a burglar hiding under Pinkie's bed, they agree to let him go on condition that he direct them to a fence. Dame Beatrice goes to make contact with the fence, only to discover, to her chagrin, that it is her own nephew Freddie. The £550 he pays her goes to an orphanage in dire straits. The quartet then go on a burglary spree. Their amateurish escapades become widely reported in the newspapers, one of which calls them "superannuated Beatniks". On more than one occasion, they narrowly evade capture.

Then Lily discovers what they are doing. Horrified, she explains how lucky they are not to be behind bars and makes them promise to stop their criminal activities. However, when Dame Beatrice receives an urgent request for money for a children's home, they decide to pull off one last job. The Major plans a raid on a high-tone, but illegal gambling party. Dame Beatrice pretends to be a gambler, while the rest of the group dress up as police officers. They stage a phoney raid of the premises, planning to make away with all the fur coats in the cloakroom, but a real police raid minutes later tests their mettle. They manage to escape with a few furs.

Lily confronts them when she sees the new furs. When Inspector Pape from Scotland Yard turns up, they expect to be arrested. However, they are relieved to discover the inspector has come round regarding a fur reported stolen from Nan (by Pinkie, as it turns out). Once the inspector departs, a furious Lily extracts a promise to stop stealing furs.

Then another plea reaches Dame Beatrice for a sorely needed charitable donation. She reminds her partners in crime that their only vow was not to steal furs. Lily and Jim go to see the Crown Jewels, and as they are leaving, Lily thinks the four Beefeaters heading into the chamber holding the jewellery look familiar, then dismisses the fantastic idea. However, her instincts are correct.

== Cast ==
- Terry-Thomas as Major Albert Rayne CB CMG MVO
- Athene Seyler as Dame Beatrice Appleby DBE
- Hattie Jacques as Nanette "Nan" Parry
- Elspeth Duxbury as Elizabeth "Pinkie" Pinkerton
- Billie Whitelaw as Lily Thompson
- Jack Hedley as Jim Benham
- Raymond Huntley as Inspector Pape
- Irene Handl as Madame Spolinski
- Sydney Tafler as Mr. Spanager
- Joan Heal as Mrs. Spanager
- Penny Morrell as Gertrude, Madame Spolinski's shop assistant
- Freddie Frinton as drunk
- Michael Balfour as doorman
- Noel Purcell as burglar
- Kenneth Williams as Hon. Freddie Warrington
- Dorinda Stevens as Jean (uncredited)
- Denis Shaw as café proprietor (uncredited)
- Michael Peake as café customer (uncredited)
- Peter Vaughan as police officer (uncredited)
- Walter Horsbrugh as children's home head (uncredited)
- John Van Eyssen as gambling den proprietor (uncredited)

== Production ==
Producer Hugh Stewart said he put together the film quickly when Norman Wisdom, with whom Stewart normally worked, went off to make a film with Americans.

Seyler and Elspeth Duxbury reprised their stage roles from the London production of Breath of Spring.

== Release ==
The film had its premiere in Birmingham. This was attended by Mandy Rice-Davies.

The film was released in the US by Continental Distribution who had a long history of releasing British comedies in the US.

== Reception ==
=== Critical ===
The Monthly Film Bulletin wrote: "Another in the current cycle of comedies about organised crime, Make Mine Mink is by no means original yet manages to whip up several tense and amusing sequences. The most successful of these rely on visual rather than verbal humour – Terry-Thomas searching for a fence, Athene Seyler at a gambling party. The dialogue, in fact, is the film's weakest feature, depending as it does on double entendres, wisecracks and leisurely aspidistra-and-antimacassar humour. The larger-than-life playing of Athene Seyler, Terry-Thomas and Hattie Jacques conflicts with Billie Whitelaw's completely different style of warm-hearted naturalism, so that the film tends to disintegrate into a series of funny sketches, very weakly linked."

Bosley Crowther, critic for The New York Times, gave it a generally favourable review, writing, "it has bumpy stretches where the script writer's clumsy jointing shows. But, on the whole, it is a comical conveyance for the cut-ups of its skillful cast."

Variety reported, "The humor is episodic, but Robert Asher has directed the lively screenplay briskly enough, and the camerawork is okay. The four members of the gang do their chores admirably, with Seyler outstanding."

Kinematograph Weekly wrote "the picture starts slowly but accelerates."

=== Box office ===
Kinematograph Weekly called it a "money maker" at the British box office in 1960.

According to Hugh Stewart, who produced, the film was a big success in the US. In February 1961, Kinematograph Weekly stated the film "is chalking up impressive figures at boxoffices in New York, Philadelphia, Los Angeles and Pittsburgh... American film critics have been unanimous in praising the film." President John F. Kennedy watched the film.

The film was one of a series of comedies starring Terry Thomas that had been popular in the US, including the Boulting brothers comedies and School for Scoundrels. Terry Thomas said "It seems I am just at the moment a 'thing.’ They are intrigued by me. They haven’t got anything like me, I don’t think it’s only my accent. Perhaps my face?”

The film was also popular in Argentina.
