= Newton, Norfolk =

Former village in England

Coordinates: 52.536°N 1.742°E

Newton was a village on the north-east coast of the English county of Suffolk. The village, which would have been in Norfolk since 1974, is now lost to coastal erosion.

== History ==
Newton was located on the North Sea coast. It was named because, under the Anglo-Saxons, it was a new settlement compared with the neighbouring Corton, Hopton and Gorleston. At the time of the Domesday Book in 1086, Newton had just one household, one freeman and half a plough team. In Edward I's 1274 Hundred Rolls, Newton was included in the Lothingland Half Hundred.

Newton was the same length as Hopton, north to south, but located to its east. In the 14th century, the northern entrance to the River Yare at Yarmouth started to silt up, causing a long sand spit to form; this ran south all the way to Gunton. Seven cuts, or gaps, were put through the spit; one of these was put through in 1408 at Newton and was known as the Newton Gap. The lane that connected Hopton with Newton was called Newton Gap Road; this is now called Beach Road. Newton itself seems to have washed away in the 16th century.

== The remnant ==
After most of Newton was lost, the remnant, which was a narrow strip, was attached to Corton in 1515. Other remnants, an area called Newton Green and stone supported cross known as Newton Cross, were lost to erosion by 1891. RAF Hopton, a Chain Home Low station, was located on that remnant. The remnant was transferred from Corton to Hopton at the time of the county reorganisation in 1974, at which point Hopton was renamed Hopton-on-Sea, as it then gained a coastline.

== St Mary's Church ==
The church at Newton was dedicated to St Mary. It was mentioned in deeds in the 14th century and last mentioned in 1526. The building was partly lost to the sea in around 1350; some of the materials being salvaged for a new north aisle at St Margaret's Church, Hopton.

There are two requests in 16th-century wills to be buried in the churchyard at Newton and the ruins of the church are recorded as having still been visible at an area called The Gate in 1791, finally being lost in the 19th century.
