= 70, Girls, 70 =

American musical

- Original Broadway Windowcard
- Music: John Kander
- Lyrics: Fred Ebb
- Book: Fred Ebb; Norman L. Martin
- Basis: Breath of Spring by Peter Coke
- Productions: 1971 Broadway; 1991 West End; 2001 Off-Broadway; 2006 Encores!

70, Girls, 70 is a musical with a book by Fred Ebb and Norman L. Martin adapted by Joe Masteroff, lyrics by Ebb, and music by John Kander.

The musical is based on the 1958 play Breath of Spring by Peter Coke, which was adapted for the movies in 1960 as Make Mine Mink. The plot concerns a group of larcenous old folks who steal furs from various New York City stores with the intent of using the proceeds from their resale to buy their Upper West Side retirement hotel, the New Sussex Arms, which is slated to be sold to developers.

== Synopsis ==
The show opens with the cast of 70, Girls, 70 stating their birthdays. The cast is made up of veterans to the stage. They are returning to Broadway and are celebrating ("Old Folks").

The cast lives at The Sussex Arms in New York City. It is a run-down hotel for senior citizens. Ida Dodd is considered to be one of the favorites at The Sussex Arms. Ida was not able to be admitted to hospitals because she did not have enough money. She decided to move to the Waldorf. When the clerk at a pharmacy treated her rudely when she needed a thermometer, she stole a thermometer. This led to her continuing her thievery. Ida makes the decision to go back home to The Sussex Arms. Her friends are surprised to see her dressed "to the nines" rather than in the simple frock she usually wears ("Home").

At the Broadhurst Theatre, the performers are celebrating the fact that they are back performing on Broadway ("Broadway, My Street").

The next day, Ida finds out that Eunice has started stealing too. She took a coat from Sadie's Fur Salon. However, Eunice leaves her coat with her name sewn in the lining at the store in exchange for the one she stole. The crew at The Sussex Arms knows they have to get back to Sadie's Fur Salon and get Eunice's coat back without getting caught. Harry puts together a plan to get this done ("The Caper").

They get the coat back thanks to Ida's fake fainting spell while pretending to be a shopper at Sadie's. The group is inexperienced, so it takes longer than it should. Ida has to keep up her ruse for a while. In her last effort of getting the shop clerks out of the way, she says that she cannot take her coffee in a cardboard cup.

In a crossover scene, the performers, Melba and Fritzi, sing about how the "trouble with the world today is coffee in a cardboard cup" ("Coffee in a Cardboard Cup").

While the group is at Sadie's, the rest of the residents at The Sussex Arms are staring at a television set. The television has no picture, however, so they have to pretend they are watching all of their favorite shows ("You and I, Love").

After the reverse robbery at Sadie's, the group decides they want to join Ida in all of her future thieving. Walter wants to sit out, though. Walter and Eunice are to be married soon. They share a moment together, but that is interrupted when they realize the audience is staring at them, wondering if they ever have sex ("Do We?").

The Sussex Arms crew, minus Walter, is ready to continue with their robberies ("Hit It, Lorraine"). They make Bloomingdale's their next target. They plan to go to the fur department. Because Gert used to work there as a detective, she is chosen to be the lookout for the group. Gert is met by her old friends in security. She stands around with them chatting right by the spot where the group is supposed to steal from. Gert tries to distract them with a story about Emma Finch. She was a kleptomaniac that used to steal furs at Bloomingdale's then went on to stealing men ("See the Light").

Act II begins with The Sussex Arms redecorated with chandeliers and television sets. The crew brings in "old folks" from the street to let them stay in The Sussex Arms. The money the crew got from lifting goods has allowed them to revitalize The Sussex Arms, which benefits the community ("Boom Ditty Boom").

With the group's success, Walter begins to be swayed towards joining them. It is revealed that Walter was formerly a safe-cracker, and this is why he was unwilling to join the group in the beginning. Eunice does not mind that Walter had a past in crime. She looks at it as an opportunity to use his skills for their next heist at the Arctic Cold Storage Vault. Walter struggles to open the door, though, because he has not done this in many years. The group may freeze to death, but Melba sings to help them lift their spirits ("Believe").

Back at the Broadhurst, the characters of a young bellhop and his grandmother are performing a duet about how visiting grandmothers is important ("Go Visit").

Eddie lets the group know that the police are there to question them. Detective Callahan and Officer Kowalski enter the lobby. They see only a bunch of old people acting as though they are deaf and have recently had operations to throw them off. When the police leave, it is made known that all they wanted to do was ask that the residents of The Sussex Arms watch the neighborhood and report anything they see that seems suspicious. The cops showing up scares the friends enough that they want to do only one more heist. They just want enough to be able to purchase The Sussex Arms themselves, then they will stop ("70, Girls, 70").

The actress who plays Ida goes on stage and says, "So they agreed to do one more." She tells the audience they need to talk about death, which up to now they have avoided, then sings what she calls "The Death Song" ("The Elephant Song/Where Does an Elephant Go?").

The last job they do turns out to be a disaster. The group goes to the International Fur Show which is being held in the New York Coliseum. They were almost caught, but Ida decides she will take the blame for it while the rest of them run away. Just before she is thrown in jail, Ida goes offstage and dies. The next time the audience sees her is sitting on a moon, looking down on Walter and Eunice's wedding. She urges Lorraine from her moon to do one last number ("Yes").

== Original cast and characters ==
Character	Broadway (1971)	West End (1991)	Off-Broadway (2001)	Encores! (2006)
Ida Dodd	Mildred Natwick	Dora Bryan	Jane Powell	Olympia Dukakis
Gert Appleby	Lillian Roth	Joan Savage	Helen Gallagher	Carole Cook
Melba Jones	Lillian Hayman	Shezwae Powell	Charlotte Rae	Tina Fabrique
Eunice Miller	Lucie Lancaster	Pip Hinton	Jane Connell	Anita Gillette
Fritzi Clews	Goldye Shaw	Buster Skeggs	Mimi Hines	Mary Jo Catlett
Harry Hardwick	Hans Conried	Len Howe	Robert Fitch	George S. Irving
Walter Hatfield	Gil Lamb	Brian Greene	George S. Irving	Bob Dishy
Eddie	Tommy Breslin	James Gavin	Christopher Morgan	Mark Price
Lorraine	Dorothea Freitag	Jo Stewart	Janet Aycock	Lalan Parrott
Sadie	Henrietta Jacobson	Stephanie Voss	Marilyn Cooper	Charlotte Rae

== Song list ==
Act I

- Old Folks - Company
- Home - Ida, Ensemble
- Broadway My Street - Melba, Fritzi, Ensemble
- The Caper - Harry
- Coffee in a Cardboard Cup - Melba, Fritzi
- You and I, Love - Mr. McIllehenny, Mrs. McIllehenny, Ensemble
- Do We? - Walter, Eunice
- Hit It, Lorraine - Ensemble
- See the Light - Gert, Male Ensemble

Act II

- Boom Ditty Boom - Company
- Believe - Melba, Ensemble
- Go Visit Your Grandmother - Eddie, Grandmother
- 70, Girls, 70 - Company
- The Elephant Song - Ida, Melba, Fritzi
- Yes - Ida, Company

1991 London additions

- Well-Laid Plans
- I Can't Do That Anymore

== Productions ==
The musical opened on Broadway on April 15, 1971, at the Broadhurst Theatre, where it ran for nine previews and 35 regular performances. The cast included Mildred Natwick, Lillian Roth, Hans Conried, and Lillian Hayman. Natwick was nominated for the Tony Award for Best Actress in a Musical. Veteran Broadway actor David Burns was also a member of the cast, until he collapsed onstage from a heart attack during a preview performance in Philadelphia just after performing a dance step in "Go Visit Your Grandmother." He died soon after. Conried replaced him. The production was supervised by Stanley Prager, directed by Paul Aaron, with set and lighting design by Robert Randolph, costume design by Jane Greenwood, musical direction and vocal arrangements by Oscar Kosarin, orchestrations by Don Walker, dance music by Dorothea Freitag, and choreography by Onna White.

The 1991 revival premiered in the West End at the Vaudeville Theatre on June 17, 1991, running through September 1991. Directed by Paul Kerryson, it starred Dora Bryan, Pip Hinton and Joan Savage. It featured a revised book, new songs, and reduced orchestrations. The production did away with the big sets, big numbers and full-scale orchestra. This production was staged on one set and with a band of five musicians with the score reorchestrated by Julian Kelly. Kerryson explained: "Part of the problem of 70, Girls, 70 on Broadway...must have been that it was done so big, which doesn't suit this particular musical. Its charm here is that it is so intimate."

The Encores! series at New York City Center presented a concert version in April 2006. Directed by Kathleen Marshall and conducted by Paul Gemignani, it starred Olympia Dukakis, Bob Dishy, Anita Gillette, George S. Irving, Carleton Carpenter, and Charlotte Rae.
