= St Margaret's Church, Hopton =

Church in Hopton-on-Sea, England

Old St Margaret's Church in 2013

St Margaret's Church is the parish church of Hopton-on-Sea in the English county of Norfolk. It is dedicated to St Margaret of Antioch. St Margaret is also the dedication of the former church, which was destroyed by fire in 1865. The ruins of the former church remain standing, and are still consecrated. Both the old and new churches are Grade II* listed. Until 1974, Hopton-on-Sea was called Hopton (although the former railway station had changed its name in 1932); the formal name for the benefice remains Hopton. The church is in the Diocese of Norwich, and is within the deanery of Lothingland and archdeaconry of Norfolk.

== Old St Margaret's ==
The old church (52.5388°N 1.7297°E) had a simple Early English nave, and a square west tower. The architecture of the church suggests it was built between 1189 and 1250. The north aisle (to both nave and chancel) was built later, around 1350, with Decorated windows. By tradition, the north aisle was built from stone salvaged from St Mary's, Newton when it collapsed into the sea. The list entry describes the church as being late 13th-century and 14th-century, built from flint with ashlar dressings and some brick, and that there is a 2-light Perpendicular west window. Before the fire, there was a 3-light Early English chancel window, and a Decorated east window in the north aisle. There was a pipe organ, which appears to have been by George Holdich and a recent introduction before the fire. The roof of the church was thatched.

There was a stove in the church for heating. After morning service on Sunday 8 January 1865 it was allowed to remain alight. It over-heated and caught fire. The thatched roof provided combustion, and the church was unable to be saved, although the registers were rescued from the flames.

The church lay in ruins, and was rebuilt elsewhere in the village. For many years the ruins were covered in ivy. However, the churchyard was not closed to burials until 1966. For the purposes of burials, a small room was maintained at the base of the tower. This room and the font were still in place in the 1950s. The ruins deteriorated significantly between the 1950s and 1980s. Hopton Parish Council purchased the ruins from the Church Commissioners in 2008 for £1. A slow-moving restoration project came to fruition in 2017, with the ruins being reopened to the public and enabling them to be removed from the Buildings at Risk Register. The ruins were the subject of an arson attack in 2019.

== New St Margaret's ==
The new St Margaret's Church (52.5397°N 1.7208°E) was built in the grounds of Hopton House, owned by James Henry Orde. Orde was married to Margaret Barclay Gurney, of the Norwich banking family, and was the grandson of the 6th Duke of Beaufort.

The new church was designed by the eminent ecclesiastical architect Samuel Sanders Teulon, and is his most prominent work in Norfolk. It is built of flint and chert with Lincolnshire limestone and bath stone dressings, in an Early English style. Two lancets in the west wall are separated by a stepped buttress and lead up to a sexfoiled roundel. There is a massive square crossing tower, typical of Teulon, rising from lean-to transepts, with another typical Teulon feature, a circular stair turret rising on the south-east corner and terminating in a high conical roof.

The windows are later introductions. Made by William Morris and Company, to designs by Edward Burne-Jones, they date, in the chancel, from 1881, and in the east window, from 1901. The chancel windows depict humility and faith, and hope and charity; the east window depicts the Resurrection. The south transept has been converted to a Julian chapel; it has modern stained glass by the 20th-century artist Paul Quail. A stained glass window commemorating Sir James Plumridge (buried in the old churchyard) was installed in the west wall of the new church, but is no longer extant.

The organ is by George Holdich, and dates from 1866, replacing the one, probably also by Holdich, lost in the fire in the old church. This has a 1890 Holdich & Ingram plate on it; additions were made in 1886 by Norman and Beard. It was cleaned in 1912 by Gray & Davison (who by then had taken over Holdich & Ingram) and in 1950 by Hill, Norman and Beard.

There is a war memorial in the churchyard, of a crucifix on a narrow octagonal stone column, with an image of the Virgin and child on the rear.

A united benefice was created in 1980, of St Margarets and St Bartholomew's, Corton.

== Vicarage ==
The vicarage was located on Warren Road. In the 1980s, the wife of the then Vicar, Sandra Chapman, hosted bed and breakfast at the vicarage. By the 1990s the vicarage had been sold, and had become the Old Vicarage Nursing Home. The nursing home closed in 2014, following a series of highly critical reports by the CQC. Unprotected by listing, the Georgian vicarage was demolished in 2015, and has been replaced by static holiday vans.

== Incumbents ==
The first incumbent was a monk, whose name is not recorded, appointed in 1090, in the reign of William Rufus. After that, the next recorded incumbent is not until 1308.

=== Perpetual curates ===
- John de Brantone, 1308
- Galfridus de Wotton, 1316
- Richard de Strattone, 1329
- Thomas Whytyng de Specteshall, 1349. Subsequently, Rector of St Julian's Church, Norwich, 1361–79.
- John Clere de Wenaston, 1360
- Walter Spendlove
- Richard Atte Hyll, 1373
- Thomas Hern de Martham, 1376
- John Hacoun, 1378
- John Hakoun de Slely, 1395

There is then a long gap in records; the next recorded incumbent is after the Reformation.

=== Vicars ===
- Hugh Weston, 1565–68
- Richard Twynne, 1568
- Thomas Russell, 1594
- Roger Webb, 1603
- Michael Beresford, 1660–78
- Andrew Heigham, 1678
- Thomas Skeete, 1693–1709
- Sir John Castleton Bt, 1755–77. Castleton was the 8th Castleton Baronet.
- Francis Bowness, 1777–1800. Bowness was Vicar in plurality with Gunton and Corton.
- Nicholas Wood, 1801
- Bartholomew Ritson, 1801–35. Recorded as Curate. Ritson died of apoplexy, in the pulpit, of the old church; he is buried at St Margaret's Church, Lowestoft. A nursing home in Hopton-on-Sea, Ritson Lodge, is named after him.
- Miles Branthwayte Salmon, 1835
- Edmund Smith Ensor, 1836–41
- Thomas William Salmon, 1842–47
- Michael Hodsoll Miller, 1848–61
- Robert Howlett, 1861–68. Howlett was the father of the photographer Robert Howlett.
- John Padmore Noble, 1868–72
- John Simonds Muller, 1872–91
- Edward Shuttleworth Medley, 1891–94. Medley was the son of John Medley, first Bishop of Fredericton in Canada.
- William Knox Ormsby, 1894–1933
- Ernest Adolph Hamilton, 1934–40. Hamilton had been a missionary in China with CMS's West China Mission, 1898–1912.
- George W Holmes, 1940–45
- Edward Arthur Flowerday, 1945–50
- Robert Brackenbury Budgett, 1950–53
- Frederick George Rogers, 1954–68
- John Evans Mason, 1968–72
- Ivor George Halliwell, 1972–77 Halliwell was also Vicar of Corton.
- Christopher Robin Chapman, 1977–80

=== Vicars of the United Benefice of Hopton with Corton ===
- Christopher Robin Chapman, 1980–92. Chapman's wife, Sandra, was a deaconess, and, from 1987, a deacon, in the parish, but died in 1988. The Sandra Chapman Centre for cancer patients at the James Paget University Hospital is named after her.
- John Bernard Simpson, 1993–99
- Roger Astley Key, 2000–19. Key had been Dean of St George's Cathedral, Windhoek, 1986–2000.

There is presently an interregnum.

== Notable burials ==
=== Old church ===
- James Hanway Plumridge, Admiral and MP.
- His third wife, Georgina Skinner Plumridge.
- The Sayers family were the owners of Hopton House and there are numerous graves in a brick vault in the north aisle of the old church. There was also a marble monument by the altar, destroyed in the fire, which commemorated John Sayers, the commander of the Revenue Cutter ''Ranger'', which was lost in a storm in 1822.

=== New church ===
- Adrian Hope, son of Col William Hope (VC)
