= Breath of Spring =

Breath of Spring is a 1958 stage comedy written by Peter Coke. It depicts a group of hitherto highly respectable senior citizens who become embroiled in stealing valuable fur coats and using the proceeds for charity. The play opened in the West End of London and ran for 430 performances. It toured the British provinces and was produced in Australia and New Zealand. It was adapted for the cinema as Make Mine Mink and as a stage musical as 70, Girls, 70.

== Background ==
The English actor Peter Coke began writing plays as a sideline. He began in 1954 co-writing with Mabel L Tyrell first The Fall of a Sparrow, followed in 1955 by a comedy entitled The Isle of Umbrellas, about weather control. Breath of Spring was his second play as sole author. The title refers to a particularly rare and expensive type of mink fur with a pale blue-grey colour.

== Production ==
After a pre-London tour, the play opened on 26 March 1958, at the Cambridge Theatre and then ran from September at the Duke of York's Theatre, a total of 430 performances. The original cast was:

- Nanette Parry – Hazel Hughes
- Brigadier Albert Rayne – Michael Shepley
- Lily Thompson – Joan Sims (Sheila Hancock from September)
- Alice, Lady Miller – Mary Merrall
- Dame Beatrice Appleby – Athene Seyler
- Elizabeth Hatfield – Elspeth Duxbury
- Pape – Antony Baird
- Kemp – David Chivers

The producer was Michael Codron and the director was Allan Davis. Designs were by Oliver Messel.

== Plot ==
Dame Beatrice Appleby rents out rooms in her large house to various ageing residents including a retired army officer, an upper-class widow, a ceramics expert and an elocution teacher. Dame Beatrice's maid, Lily, has served a prison sentence for stealing furs, and on impulse relapses and steals a fur stole from a neighbour's residence as a present for her employer. Dame Beatrice insists that the fur be restored to its owner but without exposing Lily as the thief. The Times summarised this point of the plot:

The retired brigadier realizes that a military operation is indicated. The owner of the stole must be pinned to the telephone; whoever opens the door must be decoyed down the stairs; the flat porters must be distracted; a lady must faint on the landing; and while the confusion is at its height the Brigadier, making a bold sortie, will penetrate the enemy lines and dump the stolen fur in the hall to which it belongs.

The conspirators considered that stealing furs from rich people and giving the proceeds to the poor would be better than everyday life.

They pursue the plan, with increasing success, running the risk of being caught and eventually they narrowly avoid detection by the police. When Lily discovers what her employer and associates have been up to she makes them promise to stop stealing furs. But Dame Beatrice and her colleagues have not promised to stop stealing anything apart from furs, and the play ends with the possibility of their turning their attentions to other kinds of theft.

== Reception ==
The play was given a friendly reception by reviewers. The Stage praised its "excellent twists and turns, with bright, pithy dialogue, excellent characterisation of amiable eccentricity, and just the right blending of the possible with the preposterous". In The Manchester Guardian, Philip Hope-Wallace called it "an inventive farce, well acted … a highly enjoyable piece of Kensington farcical comedy, in a cleverly inventive production by Allan Davies and it is banged across, brandished at us and slapped home with joy by a cast headed by Athene Seyler in tearing good form".

== Revivals, adaptations and sequel ==
Anna Russell headed the cast for a production that toured Australia and New Zealand in 1969.

The play was adapted for the cinema under the title Make Mine Mink in 1960. Seyler recreated her stage role as Dame Beatrice; Duxbury was the other member of the original cast seen in the film. Also in the cast were Terry-Thomas and Hattie Jacques.

Under the title 70, Girls, 70 the play was adapted as a musical in 1971 with lyrics by Fred Ebb and music by John Kander. The original Broadway cast starred Mildred Natwick, Hans Conried, Lillian Roth and Lillian Hayman. A Chichester Festival Theatre production, transferring to the West End in 1991, starred Dora Bryan.

In 1963 Seyler starred in a sequel by Coke called Midsummer Mink. Hughes and Duxbury returned from the 1958 cast, joined by Eric Barker and Joyce Carey.

== Sources ==
- Gaye, Freda, ed. (1967). Who's Who in the Theatre (fourteenth ed.). London: Sir Isaac Pitman and Sons. OCLC 5997224.
