= Sharrington =

Village in Norfolk, England

Coordinates: 52.88876°N 1.01881°E

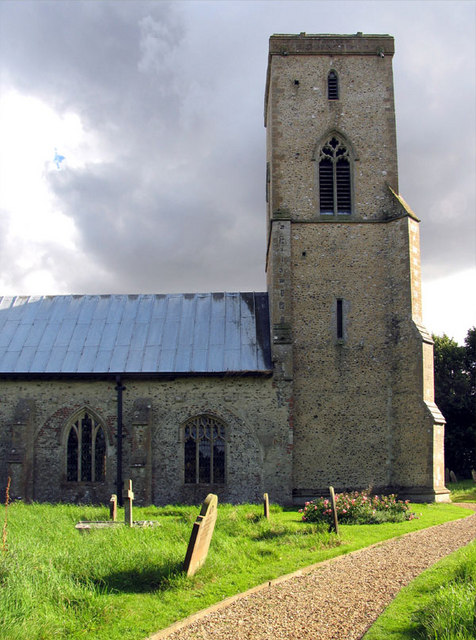
- All Saints' parish church, Sharrington, Norfolk

- Location within Norfolk
- OS grid reference: TG030360
  - London: 124 miles (200 km)
- Civil parish: Brinton
- District: North Norfolk
- Shire county: Norfolk
- Region: East
- Country: England
- Sovereign state: United Kingdom
- Post town: MELTON CONSTABLE
- Postcode district: NR24
- Dialling code: 01263
- Police: Norfolk
- Fire: Norfolk
- Ambulance: East of England
- UK Parliament: North Norfolk

Sharrington is a village and former civil parish, now in the parish of Brinton, in the North Norfolk district, in the county of Norfolk, England. The village is laid out on the southern edge of the A148, 3.5 miles west of Holt. The village is 10 miles east-northeast of the town of Fakenham, 13.4 miles west-southwest of Cromer and 124 miles north-northeast of London. The nearest railway station is at Sheringham for the Bittern Line which runs between Sheringham, Cromer and Norwich. The nearest airport is at Norwich. In 1931 the parish had a population of 195. On 1 April 1935 the parish was abolished and merged with Brinton.

The villages name means 'Dung farm/settlement'.

== Description ==
Sharrington is strung out along a series of connecting lanes with the dwellings well scattered. There is a well used and thriving village hall at one end of the village with the parish church at the opposite end of the village. Within the village there are two motor repair garages. Fish Engineering is a family-run business, started in the early 1920s by the late Thomas Fish.

== All Saints' Parish Church ==
The parish church of Sharrington is called All Saints' and can be found in Bale Road. A church has been recorded here since the 13th century. All Saints' parish church was described in the Early English Era as a "grand church of great local importance", however: the north and south aisles, transept and porch were taken down in the middle of the 18th century due to a significant reduction in the local population and the resulting loss of wealth. The church's tall tower still stands and was renovated for the Millennium. The church's set of corbels reflects the previous grandeur. Inside the church there is a stone font with an oak cover, designed and locally carved and donated to celebrate the year 2000. It is a Grade I listed building .

=== People ===
Peter Coke: soldier; artist; playwright; radio star: (Paul Temple)
