= Eustace Ingram =

British organ builder (1839–1924)

Eustace Ingram (6 August 1839 – 10 December 1924) was a British organ builder based in London.

== Early life and work ==
He was born in 1839 and apprenticed to Robert Snell until 1860 when he was articled to Henry Willis to learn reed-voicing.

He established his own business and was in partnership with Henry Speechly from 1873 for a short period. In 1894 he acquired the business of George Holdich and for a short period the firm traded as Holdich & Ingram until it was taken over by Gray and Davison.
