= Holy Trinity Church, Trowbridge =

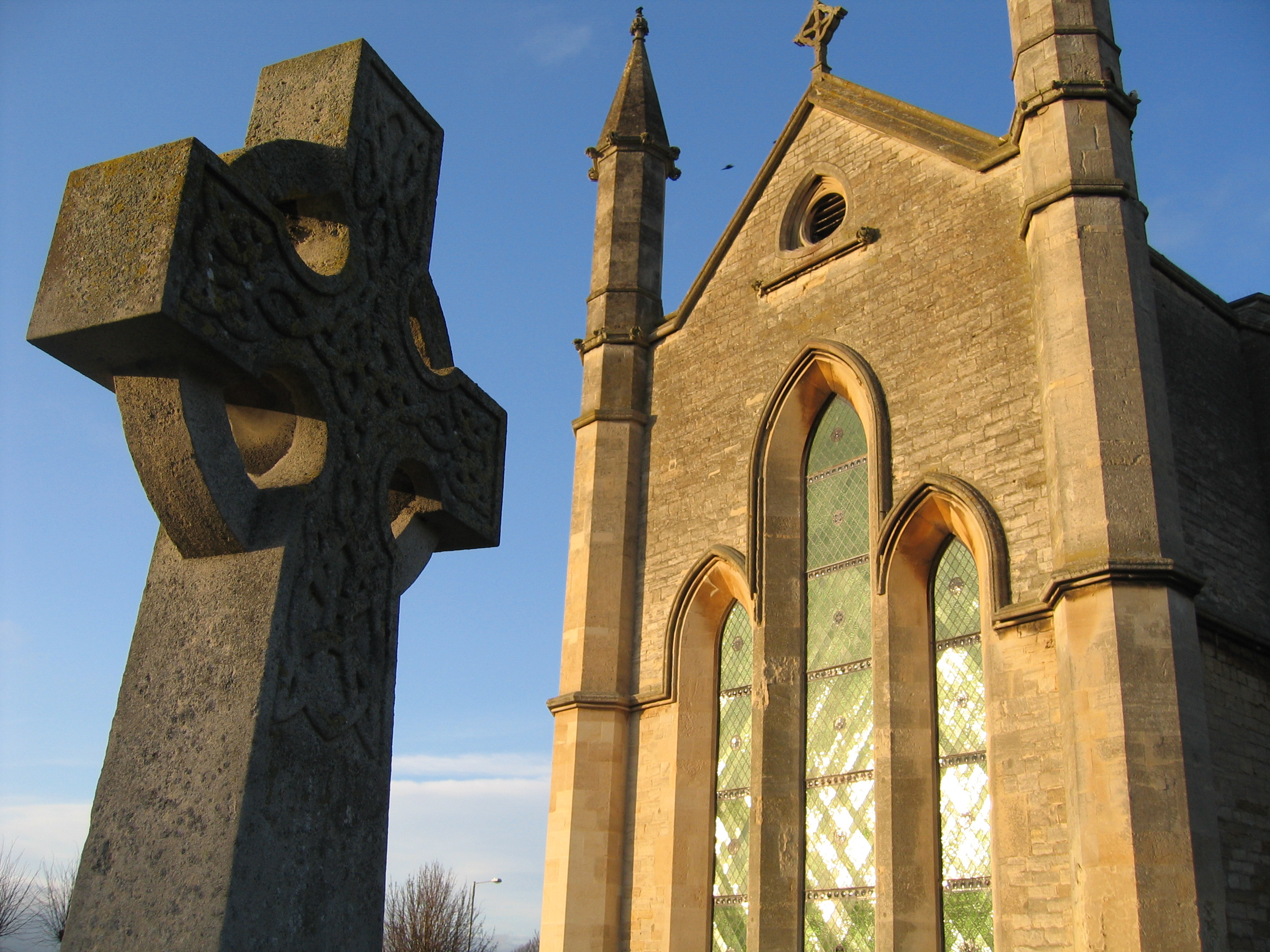
- The west end of Holy Trinity Church and the World War I war memorial
- Holy Trinity Church, Trowbridge
- 51°19′07″N 02°12′52″W
- Denomination: Church of England
- Churchmanship: Broad Church

History
- Dedication: Holy Trinity

Administration
- Parish: Trowbridge, Wiltshire

Holy Trinity Church, Trowbridge is a Grade II* listed 19th-century Church of England church in Trowbridge, Wiltshire, England, which had parish church status until 2011. It is commonly known in Trowbridge as 'The Church on the Roundabout', as it is encircled by a one-way traffic system.

== History ==
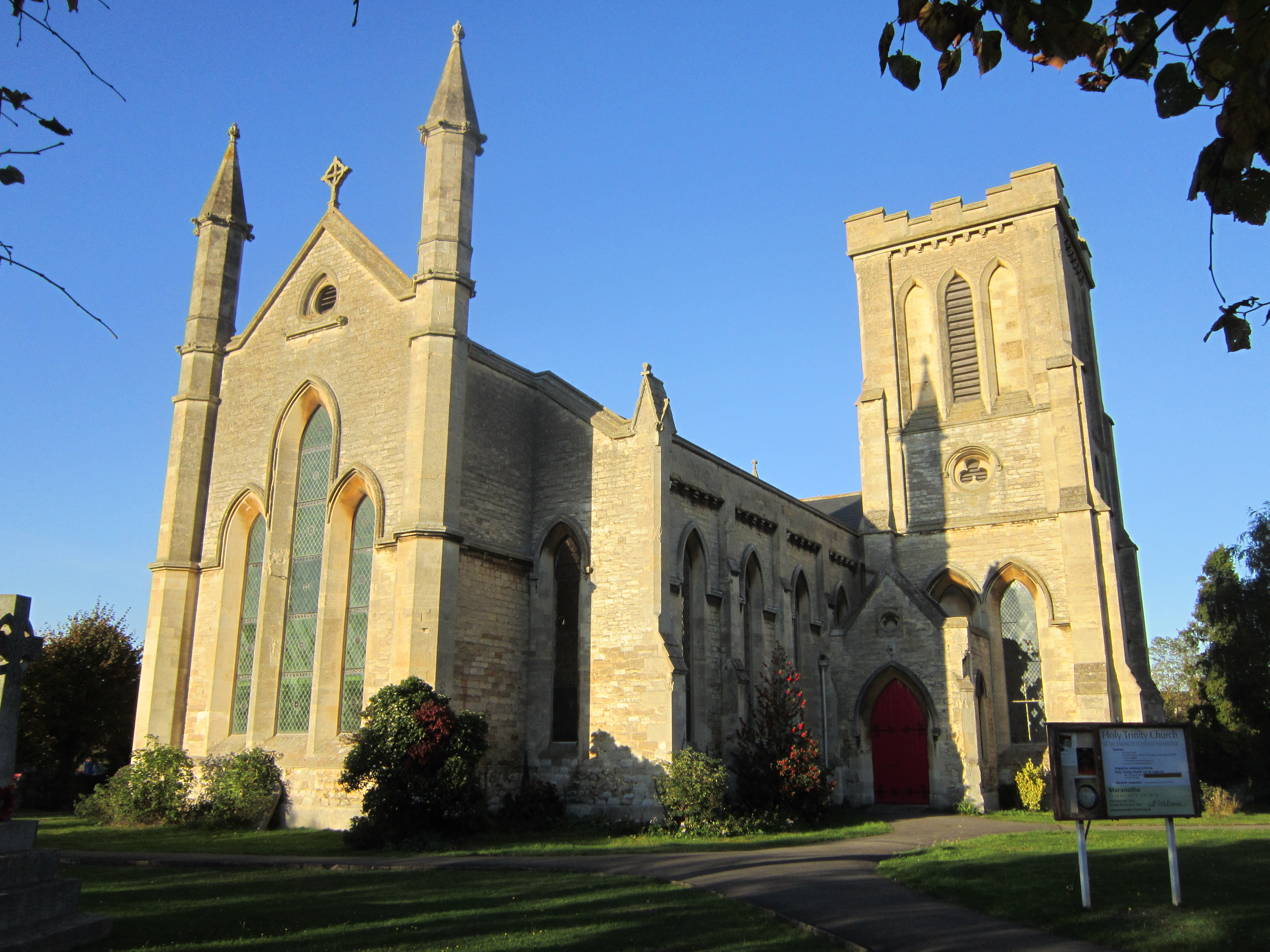
Holy Trinity Church, completed in 1838

The Trowbridge manor which included the land on which the church stands was bought in 1807 from the fifth Duke of Rutland, who retained the patronage. It had been noted that the existing parish church could barely hold a twelfth of the 12,000 population, and so plans were set in motion to build a new, larger church. In 1835 fund-raising appeals were begun by Francis Fulford, the then-rector of the parish church of St. James, with estimated construction costs of £4000.

The total cost of the church was £5,251 (equivalent to £500,000 in 2025), towards which a grant of £1,676 (equivalent to £160,000 in 2025) was provided by the partly at the cost of the Church Building Commissioners. The building contractors for the church were Charles and Richard Gane.

A. F. Livesay of Portsmouth was appointed as architect. Other works of his included the recently completed Holy Spirit Church, Newtown, on the Isle of Wight. Livesay's design is in the Early English architectural style, and is based on elements of Salisbury Cathedral, including the vaulting and bosses of the north and south aisles in the Cathedral. The church was built of poor-quality Westwood stone, with the interior having iron and plaster columns (the plaster painted to mimic marble such as the Purbeck marble of Salisbury cathedral's columns), and plaster scribed with false ashlar blocks to mimic high-quality stonework in the vaulting and walls. There were four porches, one of which (the south porch, the main entrance to the church nowadays) is situated under an embattled tower. The windows were originally plain, clear glass.

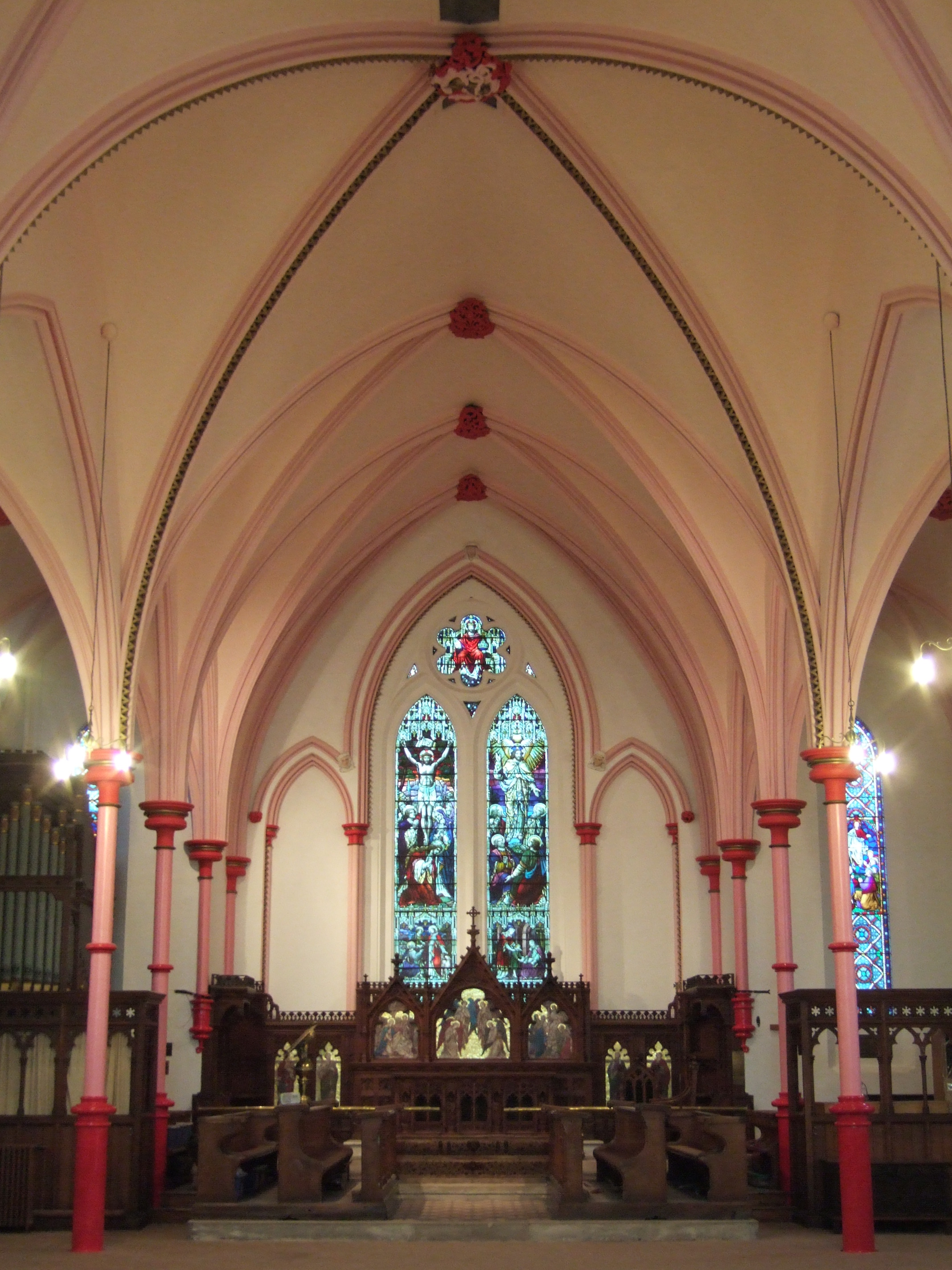
Holy Trinity (left) is based on elements of Salisbury Cathedral (right)

Unusually, the church is not oriented east/west, but rather north-east/south-west.

The foundation stone was laid in 1837, with the builders Richard and Charles Gane. 7,000 people attended the ceremony, indicating the importance of the event. The building took just over a year to complete, and cost £6,415 and 12 shillings. It was consecrated by the Bishop of Salisbury on 1 November 1838. At this time it had a west gallery which extended as far as the first set of iron columns, and the organ, actually a seraphine, was also at this end of the church. A plaque on the south wall states that on consecration it held seats for 1033 parishioners.

Other alterations to the arrangement of the church's layout have since been made. The clergy vestry was in the south-east corner, in the area now occupied by the toilets off the south transept. The north-east porch is now the flower vestry, and the font originally stood where the organ is now, but was replaced by a newer font in 1874.

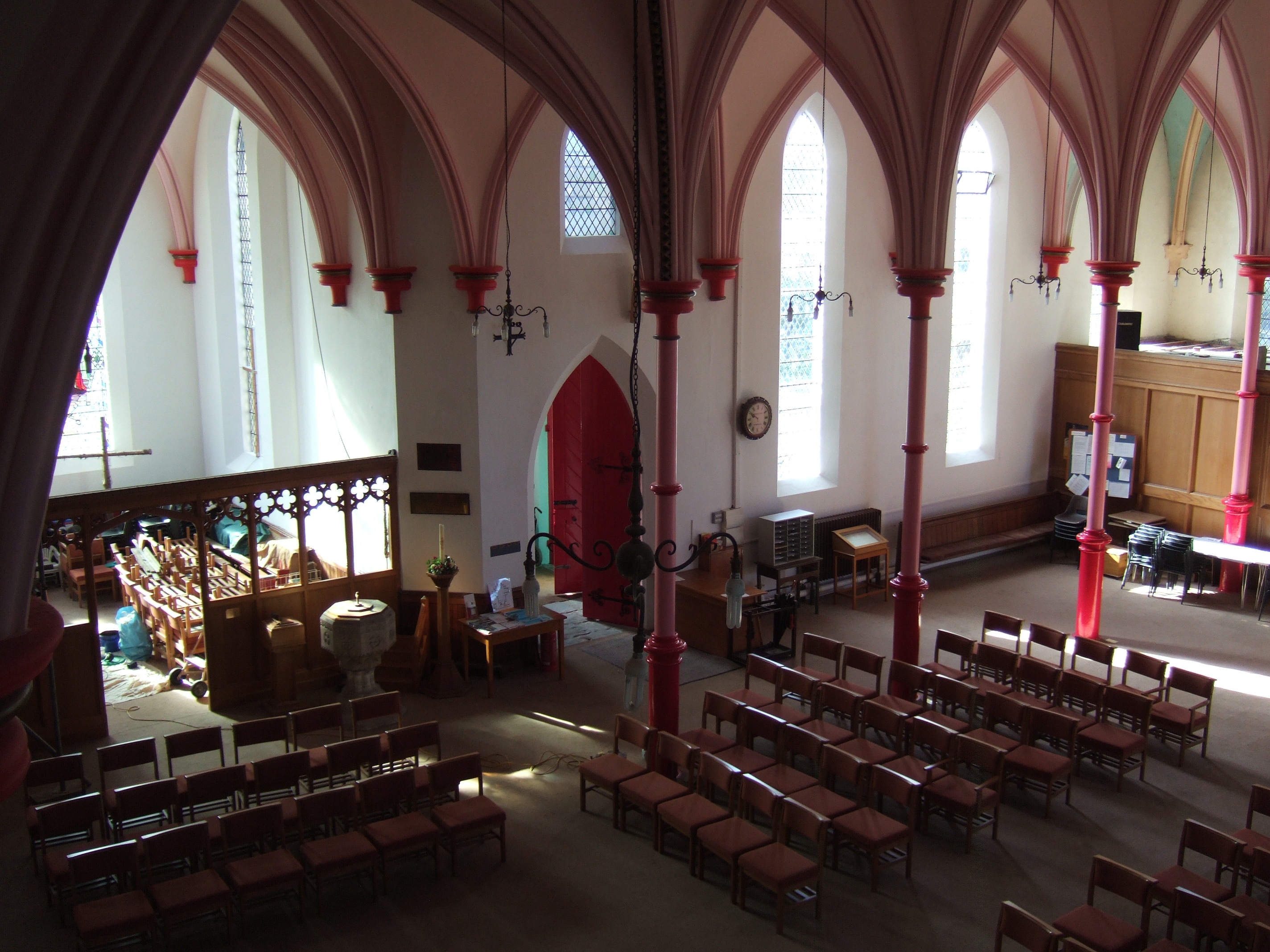
The nave, south aisle and south transept

In 1852 a new organ was installed in the west gallery, and in 1861-2 new heating apparatus was installed. In 1866 the first marble wall monument was erected. In 1871 the south transept was turned into a side chapel for weekday services. To mark the church's 50-year jubilee in 1888, the west gallery was removed and the organ moved to the chancel area and choir stalls added alongside. The font was moved to the west gallery at the same time. In 1898 the west end of the church was partially re-seated.

In 1901 the first serious report on the church's fabric showed the folly of using the relatively cheap Westwood stone, with weak buttresses and weathered stone. Between 1902 and 1904 the chancel was raised above the level of the nave and screens erected forming and organ chamber on the north and a choir vestry to the south. In 1908 the reseating of the church was completed, reducing the seats from 1033 to nearer 750.

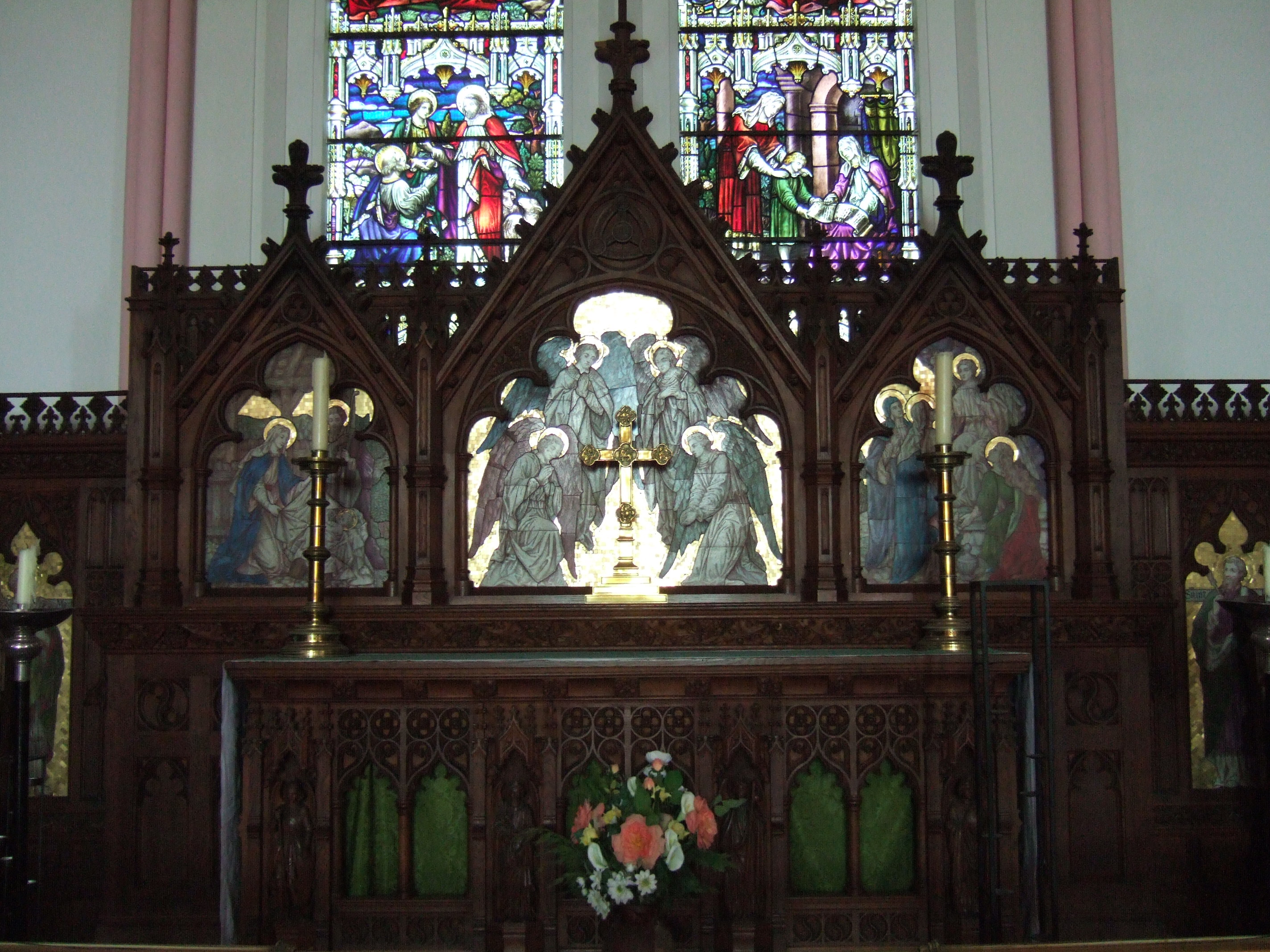
The reredos in All Saints' Chapel at the east end of the church

The All Saints' chapel (at the eastern end of the church) was refurbished in 1911. In 1914 the high altar reredos with credence table, Bishop's stall and sedilia was erected, the work of A. L. Moore of London. The reredos is of carved oak with panels of opus sectile, showing adoring angels in the centre, with the Nativity to the left and the Resurrection to the right, with flanking portraits, two on either side, of the four Archangels - Michael, Gabriel, Raphael and Uriel.

In 1927 a reredos was dedicated in the All Saints' Chapel, showing the Transfiguration, and signed by A. L. and C. E. Moore and dated 1924.

In 1940, a screen was erected between the Lady Chapel (in the north transept) and the nave. A new choir vestry at the west end of the nave was built as a memorial to those who died in World War II. The font was moved from this area and placed under the Norris window in the south transept. The names of the 56 members of the parish who died in the war are carved on the screen, on either side of the central door. The screen was dedicated in 1951. In 1955 the former choir vestry in the All Saints' Chapel was converted to a side chapel.

In the 1970s, the development of the new Trowbridge inner relief road involved the demolition of a few buildings near the church, and the creation of a one-way traffic-light controlled roundabout around the church, effectively isolating it. It soon gained the local nickname "The Church on the Roundabout".

In 1980-1 the vicar's vestry was converted to toilets, the font was moved to near the main door, and a screen to match that in the Lady Chapel was erected between the south transept and the nave. This area was used as a crèche. At the same time a simple, movable wooden nave altar was installed.

The pews were removed in 2000 and replaced with chairs.

=== Windows ===
On each side of the east window is a window to the memory of Charles Gane, one of the builders of the church, who died in 1866. That on the left represents the Resurrection, and that on the right the Ascension. The maker is unknown.

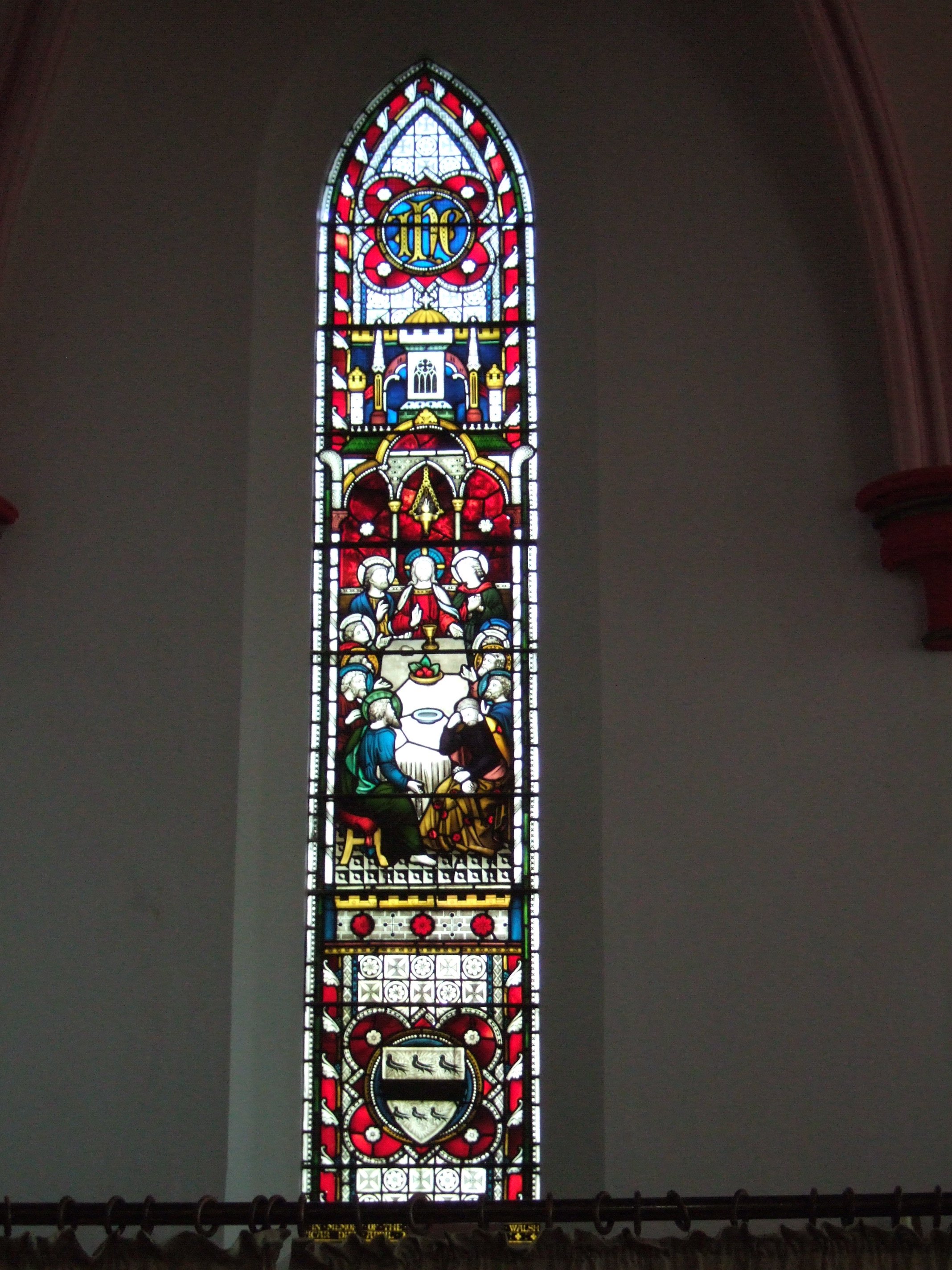
The memorial window to Reverend Digby Walsh, made by A. L. Moore

On the south wall near the east end of the church is the memorial window to the Revd Digby Walsh, vicar of the church for eleven years and who died at the age of 39 in 1869. The maker was A. L. Moore of London.

In 1906 Alice Ewing, the wife of the vicar Robert Ewing, died, and a window in her memory was inserted in the north wall.

Robert died a few years later in 1908, and the magnificent east window was inserted in 1909 in his honour. The window was also designed and made by A. L. Moore, and the left-hand upper window depicts the Crucifixion, with Mary, John and Mary Magdalene; the window below shows Christ telling Peter "Feed my lambs", a reference to Dr Ewing's educational work. The right-hand upper window represents the Ascension; the light below shows the aged grandmother and mother teaching the scriptures to Timothy, the subject of Dr Ewing's last sermon, preached the day before he died. Jesus is shown in the upper rose; some of the stonework was cut away to allow a greater area for the stained glass image.

In 1913 the small window above the flower vestry door in the north wall was inserted in the memory of Harry Moore, the church organist who had died the previous year. It shows St. Gregory holding a sheet of plainsong.

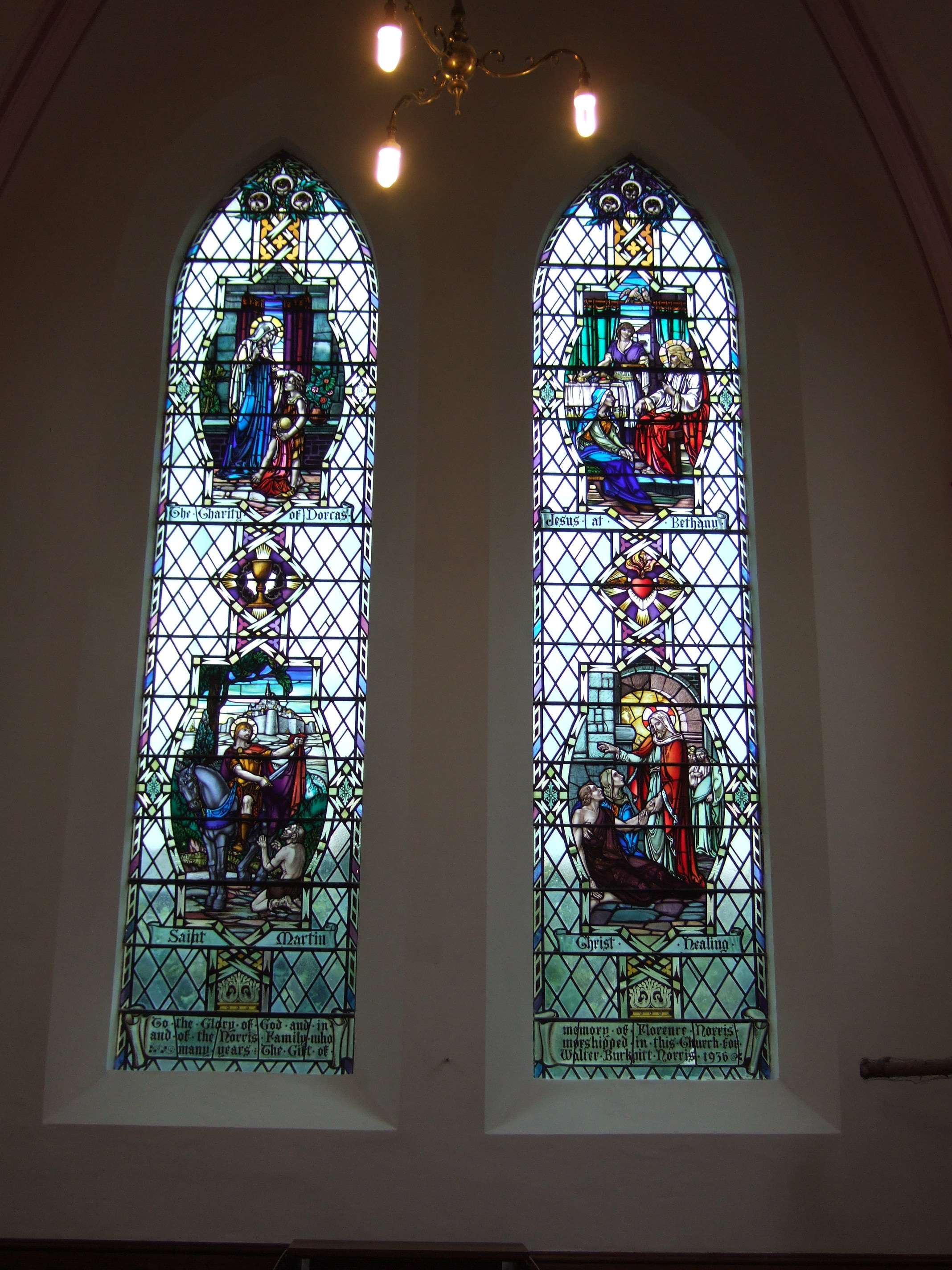
The window in the south transept in memory of Florence Norris, made by Morris & Co.

In 1937 the windows in the south transept were dedicated in memory of Florence Norris. They show the charity of Dorcas top left; beneath is St Martin on horseback with a beggar. The top right window shows Jesus at Bethany in the house of Simon the leper, and below is Jesus healing Lazarus. The windows were made by Morris & Co.

In 1945 the windows were erected in the Lady Chapel in memory of Arthur Stancomb. They were designed to echo the style of the windows in the chapel in the south transept. The top left light shows Christ the good shepherd, with St. Francis beneath him. The top right light shows Jesus with the little children, and below is St. Christopher, patron saint of travellers.

=== Redecoration and repair ===
The first episode of redecoration and repair of the church interior and churchyard occurred during Digby Walsh's tenure as vicar, i.e. sometime between 1858–1869, with a second taking place in 1884. Records are unclear about the intervening period, but the church was again redecorated completely in 1967-8, and as part of the redecoration the half-shafts of the pillars on the walls were removed, apart from at the far east and west ends of the church. In 2009 the church was repaired and redecorated internally, with the colour scheme changing from blues and stone colours to reds, pinks, white and gold.

== The churchyard ==
A Portland stone cross was erected as a memorial to the fallen of World War I from the parish. It bears 147 names in total, and was dedicated in 1921. Many of the gravestones were removed in 1977.

== Status ==
When the church was built, it was a chapelry of the town's parish church, St James'. A parish was created for it in 1839 by combining the tithings of Studley and Little Trowle, with boundaries defined largely by the River Biss and the Trowle Brook. Studley (then a rural community) became a separate district in 1858, after the building of St John's church there in 1852.

In 1976 the church was designated as Grade II* listed.

The building ceased to be a parish church in December 2010 when its parish was divided between four neighbouring parishes, and the building then became a chapel of ease within the parish of St. Thomas the Apostle, Trowbridge. A proposed merger with the nearby Methodist church at Wesley Road never took place. Holy Trinity continues in use for the evening services formerly held at St. Thomas's, and for outreach work within Trowbridge, youth work, concerts, a mothers and toddlers group, and other activities.

== See also ==
- List of Commissioners' churches in southwest England
