= St Andrew's Church, Brinton =

Church in Brinton, Norfolk

St Andrew's Church
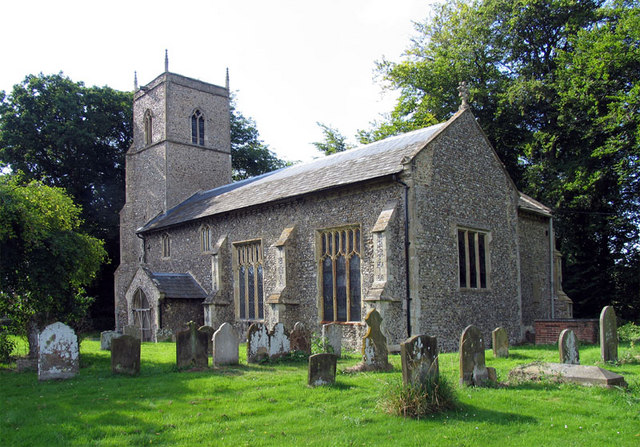
- St Andrew's Church
- 52.88053°N 1.02762°E
- Location: Brinton, Norfolk
- Country: England
- Denomination: Church of England

Administration
- Diocese: Norwich
- Deanery: Holt

St Andrew's Church, Brinton is a Grade I listed parish church in Brinton, Norfolk, England. The church dates from the 14th century and underwent alterations in the 17th and 19th centuries. It is notable for its 16th-century carved wooden bench ends.

== History ==
St Andrew's Church dates from the 14th century, although it retains some earlier architectural features. It features Early English and Perpendicular Gothic elements. The church underwent alterations in the 17th century. and was remodeled in the 19th century, when new stained-glass windows were installed.

== Architecture ==
=== Structure ===
The church is constructed of flint with stone dressings and has a slate roof. It consists of a west tower, nave, chancel, north aisle, north transept and south porch.

The west tower has diagonal buttresses, a Perpendicular west window and four bell openings in the Decorated Gothic style. Three pinnacles survive on the parapet. The nave has Perpendicular windows and clerestory windows on the south side. The chancel has a three-light east window dating from the 17th century. The north aisle contains an Early English window and a blocked doorway, while the north transept has a three-light Perpendicular window with a niche above it.

=== Interior ===
Carved wooden bench end, St Andrew's Church

Inside, three arches separate the nave from the north aisle. The tower arch rests on projecting stone supports. The 15th-century nave roof retains its original timber supports, including an additional half-bay above the former rood screen. The north aisle and transept also have 15th-century timber roofs. A blocked stairway entrance survives on the north side.

A 17th-century painted inscription on the north wall contains passages from St Paul's Epistle to the Romans, the First Epistle of John and the Gospel of Matthew.

== Stained glass and fittings ==
The church contains 16th-century benches with carved poppyhead ends, one bearing the date 1544. The carvings depict secular subjects, including a man playing a drum, a man playing a hurdy-gurdy and a person churning butter. Other fittings include a Perpendicular font and a deep holy water stoup near the south entrance.

The stained glass includes windows by A. L. Moore in the north aisle (1892) and south wall of the chancel (1895). The east window, dating from approximately 1850, is by Mayer & Co. A scene depicting Christ with fishermen in the upper lights of a south window is by Paul Quail.
