= Paul Quail =

British stained-glass artist

- Born: 1928
- Died: 2010 (aged 81–82)
- Education: Chelsea College of Arts
- Known for: Stained glass

Paul Reginald Quail (18 August 1928 – 31 July 2010) was a British stained-glass artist. He was elected a fellow of the British Society of Master Glass Painters in 1973 and was a member of Christian Arts and the Society of Catholic Artists.

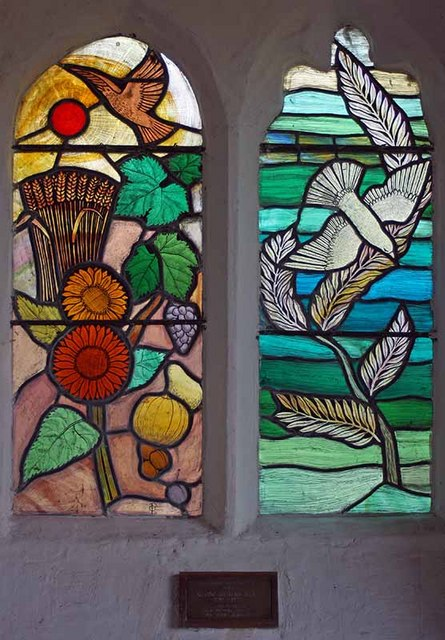
St Mary's Church, Tasburgh, Norfolk

== Career ==
He was born in Langley, Buckinghamshire and attended Blackfriars school in Laxton, Northamptonshire. After serving in the Royal Tank Regiment during the Second World War he studied art and design at the Chelsea School of Art and went on to Brighton College of Art where he qualified as an art teacher. He then served an apprenticeship at the stained-glass studios of Lowndes & Drury, Francis Spear and Eddie Nuttgens. He taught the art of stained-glass at Flatford Mill and at West Dean College.

Stained-glass windows that he designed were made using handmade glass, usually with a religious concept, and are to be found both in Britain and abroad. Quail designed the windows in the south transept of St Margaret's Church, Hopton when it was converted to a Julian chapel. Heavenly Jerusalem was installed in St Thomas Aquinas Church, Ham in 1990 as the sole stained-glass window.

== Personal life ==
He was married for a second time in 1981 to the sculptor Jane Quail and they had a studio in Gunthorpe, Norfolk. He died on 31 July 2010 and was buried at East Bergholt Cemetery.

== List of Works ==
- St Andrew's Church, Brinton, Norfolk
- St. Margaret's Church, Hopton-on-Sea, Norfolk
- St Madoc of Ferns Church, Haroldston West, Pembrokeshire
- St. Mary's Church, Tasburgh, Norfolk
- Christchurch Priory, Dorset - Cloister Way Windows showing the 900 year history of Christchurch Priory
- All Saint's Church, Syerston, Notts
