= Elspeth Duxbury =

British actress (1909–1967)

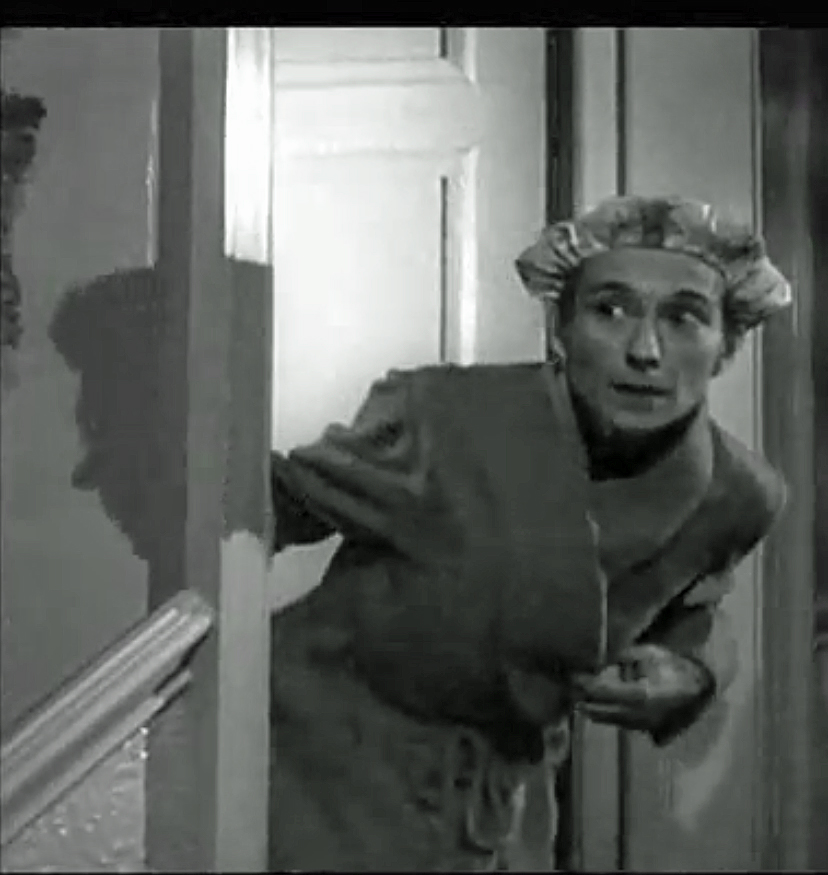
- Elspeth Duxbury in trailer for "Make Mine Mink" (1960)
- Born: 23 April 1909; Mhow, British India
- Died: 10 March 1967 (aged 57); London, England
- Occupation: Actress
- Years active: 1938–1966

Elspeth Duxbury (23 April 1909 – 10 March 1967) was a British actress.

Born in Mhow, British India, she was known primarily for working in theatre, she had one television role in 1938 but did not make her big screen debut until 1960 in the Terry-Thomas hit comedy Make Mine Mink.

She followed this with a role on Alfred Hitchcock Presents the following year in the episode "I Spy". Concentrating more on theatre, she had two further television roles, one a biography of Alexander Graham Bell and the other in the twice weekly BBC comedy drama series Swizzlewick.

In 1966, she appeared in two films, including the fourth St Trinian's film, The Great St Trinian's Train Robbery.

Her final screen role (and one she had performed on stage) was a televised version of the well known farce Big Bad Mouse with Eric Sykes and Jimmy Edwards.

Elspeth Duxbury was found dead in her room, at the St Martin's Hotel, London, on 10 March 1967 aged 57.

== Filmography ==
- 1938 Laugh with Me (TV) (as Sophia Kimberley)
- 1960 Make Mine Mink (as Elizabeth Pinkie Pinkerton)
- 1961 Alfred Hitchcock Presents (Season 7 Episode 9: "I Spy") (TV series) (as Gladys)
- 1964 Swizzlewick (TV series) (10 episodes) (as Miss. Oldacre)
- 1965 Alexander Graham Bell (TV series) (Season 1 Episode 1: "Journey in the Air") (as Mrs. Tweedie)
- 1966 The Great St. Trinian's Train Robbery (as Veronica Bledlow)
- 1966 The Yellow Hat (as Customer)
- 1966 Big Bad Mouse (TV movie) (as Miss Spencer)
