= A. L. Moore =

English glass-maker

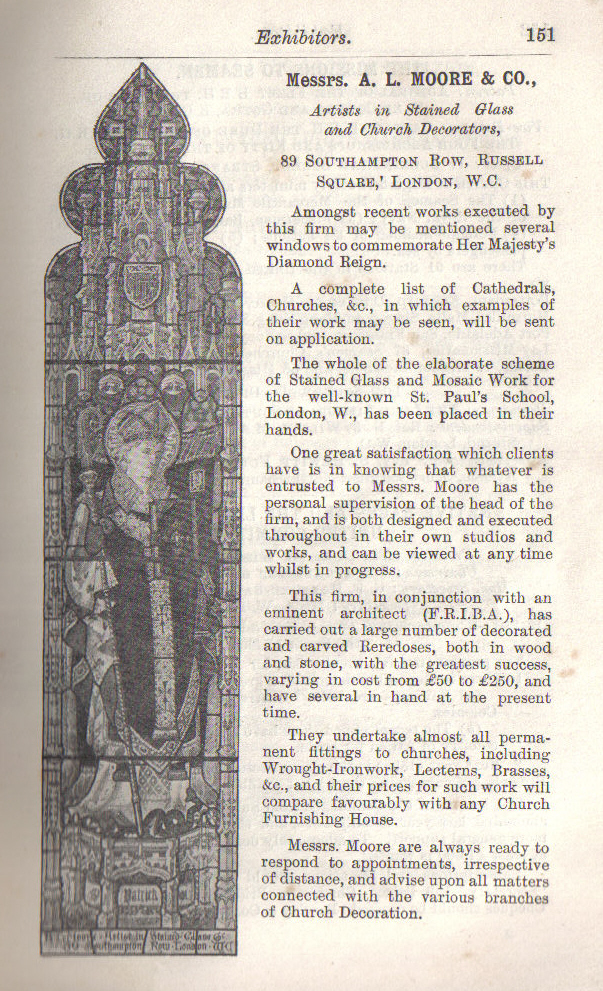
Advertisement from the Illustrated Guide to the Church Congress 1897

Arthur Louis Moore (1849–24 March 1939) was an English glass-maker who specialised in stained glass windows.

== Life ==
Moore was born in Brixton, London, one of nine children of a Clerkenwell clockmaker, and in 1871 he founded, along with a Mr. S. Gibbs, the London company of Gibbs and Moore, glassmakers. In subsequent years Moore seems to have worked on his own, operating as A. L. Moore, Glass Painters and Decorators from premises at 89 Southampton Row, London.

Moore was joined by his son Charles Eustace Moore (1880–1956) in 1896, when the company became known as A. L. Moore and Son. Their premises in Bedford Way, Russell Square, London were bombed in 1940, but under C. E. Moore the business continued until 1952.

Over the course of their careers the Moores produced over 1,000 windows in the UK and 100 overseas.

Moore died on 24 March 1939 in St Albans, Hertfordshire aged 89.

== List of stained-glass works ==
=== England ===
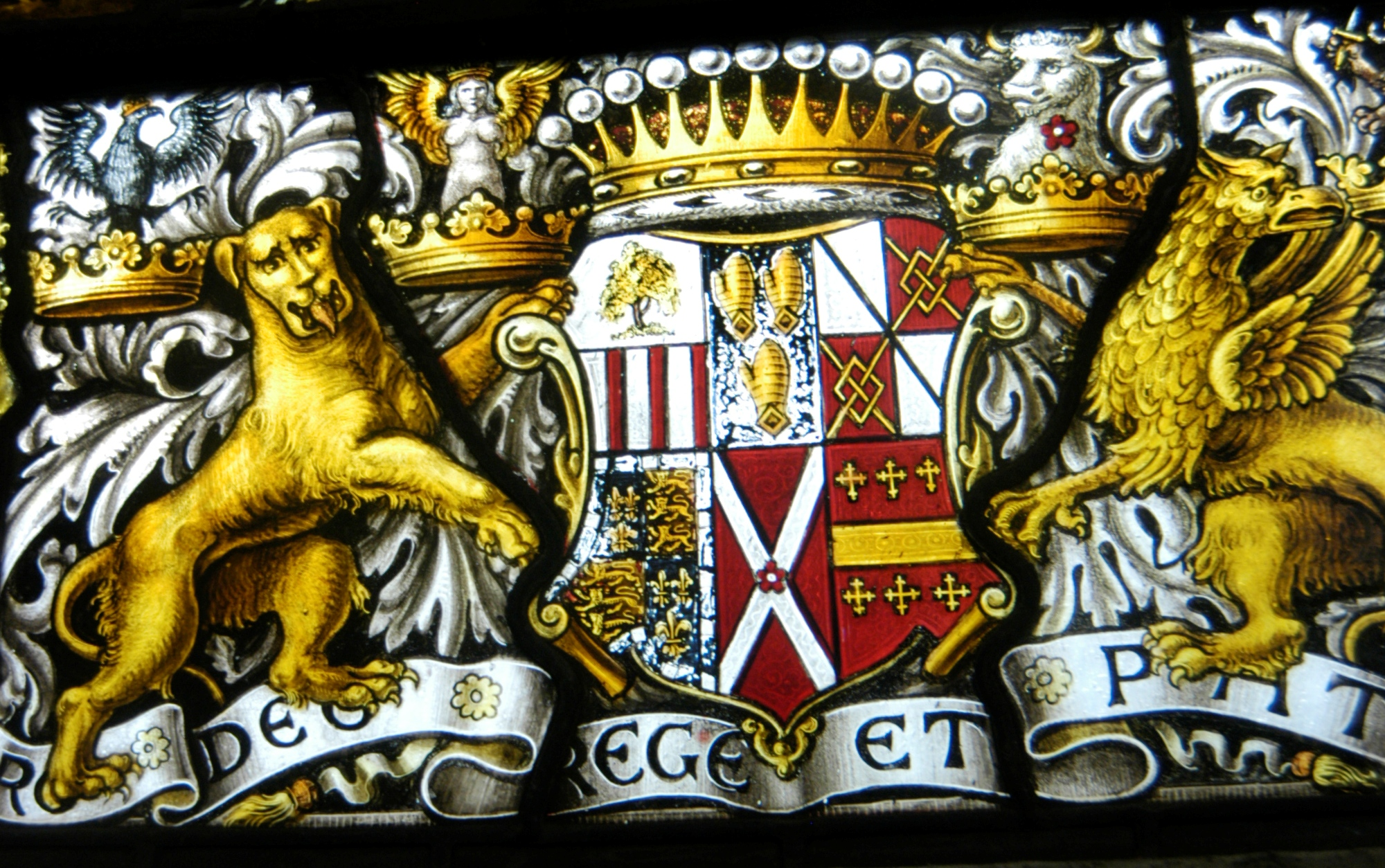
A full heraldic achievement, lowest part of an 1889 window by A. L. Moore, at S.S. Peter & Paul, Harlington, Middlesex.

- Christ Church, Cotmanhay, Derbyshire
- Church of St. John the Baptist, Newport, Devon
- St. Peter's Church, Dorchester, Dorset
- Church of St. Peter and St. Paul, Harlington, Greater London
- Hospital Church of St. Luke, Gosport, Hampshire
- All Saints' Church, Gurnard, Isle of Wight
- St. Paul's Church, Canterbury, Kent
- St. Mary's Church, Bottesford, Leicestershire
- St. Swithin's Church, Lincoln, Lincolnshire
- Church of St. John the Baptist, South Witham, Lincolnshire
- St. Andrew's Church, Brettenham, Norfolk
- Church of St. Mary, Bridgham, Norfolk
- St Andrew's Church, Brinton, Norfolk
- Church of St. Mary, East Ruston, Norfolk
- Church of St. John the Evangelist, Dormansland, Surrey
- St. Philip's Church, Burwash, East Sussex
- St. Margaret's Church, Ditchling, East Sussex
- St. Mary's Church, Eastbourne, East Sussex
- All Saints' Church, Heathfield, East Sussex
- St. John the Baptist's Church, Hove, East Sussex
- Church of St. John the Baptist, Netherfield, East Sussex
- St. Nicholas' Church, Pevensey, East Sussex
- St. John the Evangelist's Church, Preston Village, East Sussex
- St. Luke's Church, Queen's Park, East Sussex
- St. Denys' Church, Rotherfield, East Sussex
- Church of St. Mary the Virgin, Salehurst, East Sussex
- Church of St. Michael and All Angels, Lancing, West Sussex
- Church of St. Michael and All Angels, Partridge Green, West Sussex
- Christ Church, Sayers Common, West Sussex
- Church of St. Andrew and St. Cuthman, Steyning, West Sussex
- St. Peter's Church, West Green, West Sussex
- St. Peter ad Vincula's Church, Wisborough Green, West Sussex
- St. Botolph's Church, Heene, West Sussex
- Holy Trinity Church, Trowbridge, Wiltshire
- St. Mary's Church, Goathland, North Yorkshire
- St. Mary's Church, Over Silton, North Yorkshire
- St. Mary Magdalene Church, Geddington, Northamptonshire.

=== Northern Ireland ===
- St. Columb's Cathedral, Derry, County Londonderry
- Carrick Church, Limavady, County Londonderry

=== Wales ===
- St. Mary's Church, Spittal, Pembrokeshire

=== Republic of Ireland ===
- St. Brigid's Cathedral, Kildare, County Kildare
- St. Paul's Church, Banagher, County Offaly

== Gallery ==
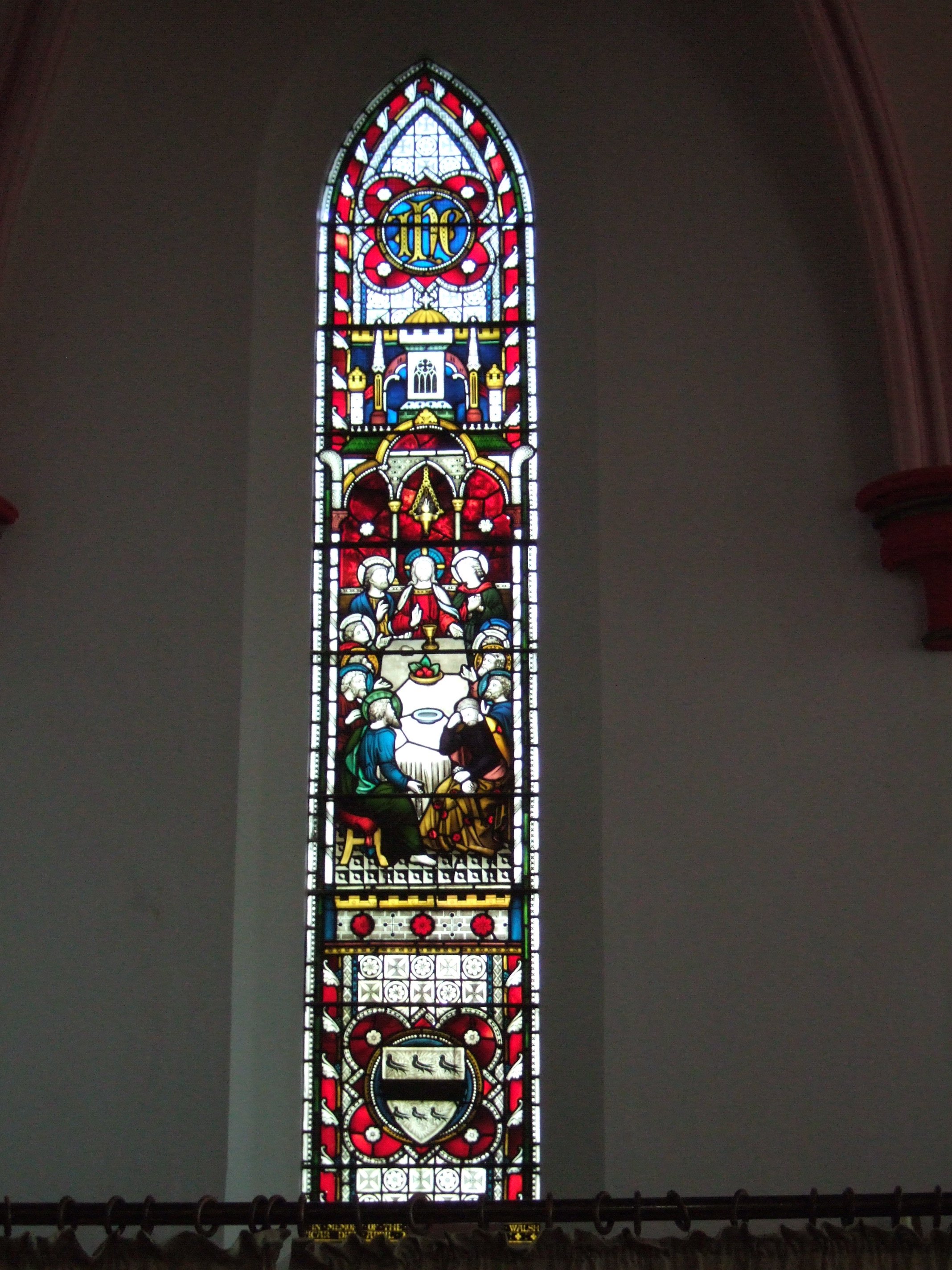
Holy Trinity Church Trowbridge memorial to Rev Digby Walsh. 1869

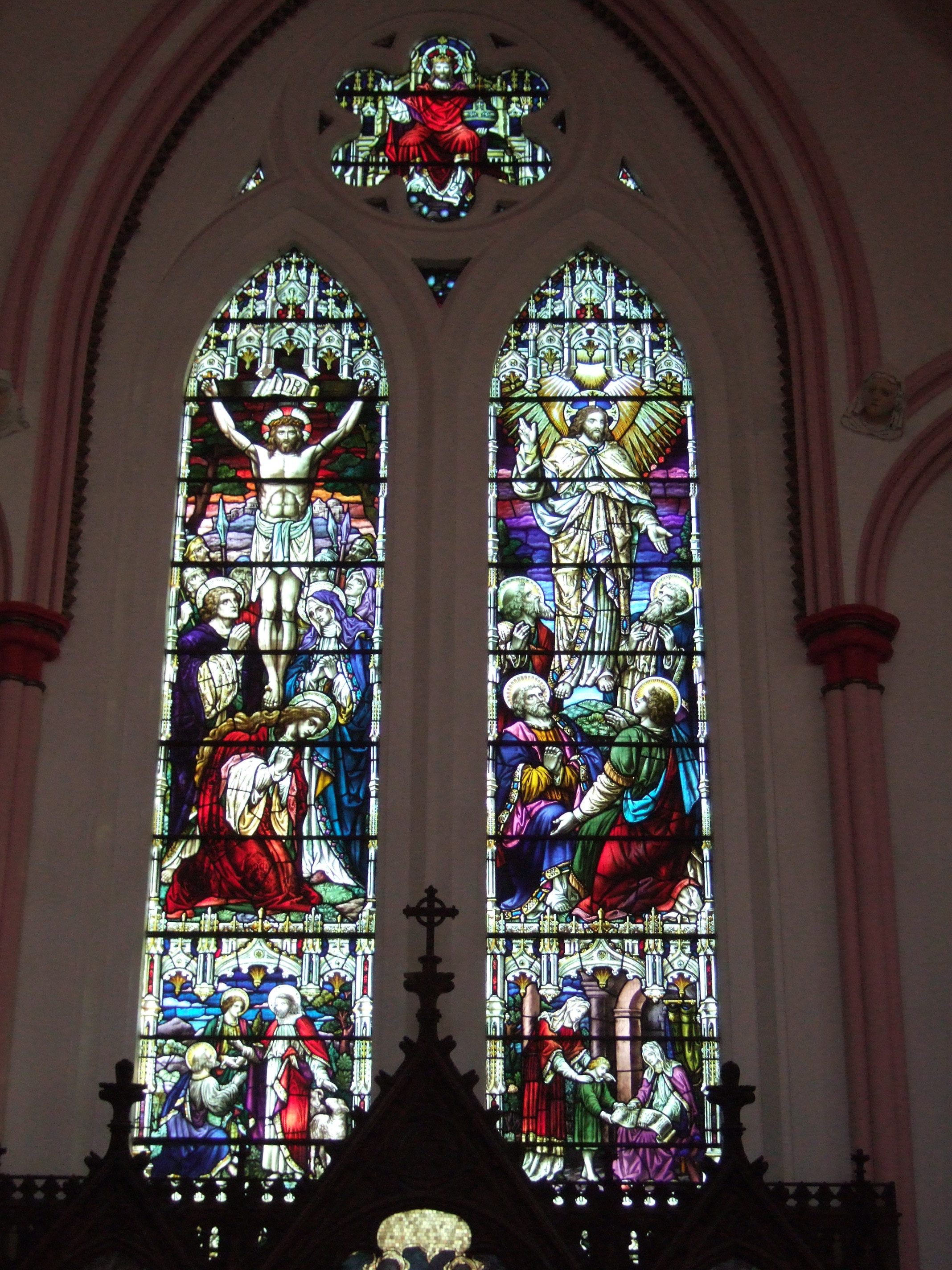
East window, in All Saints Chapel, Holy Trinity Church Trowbridge. 1909

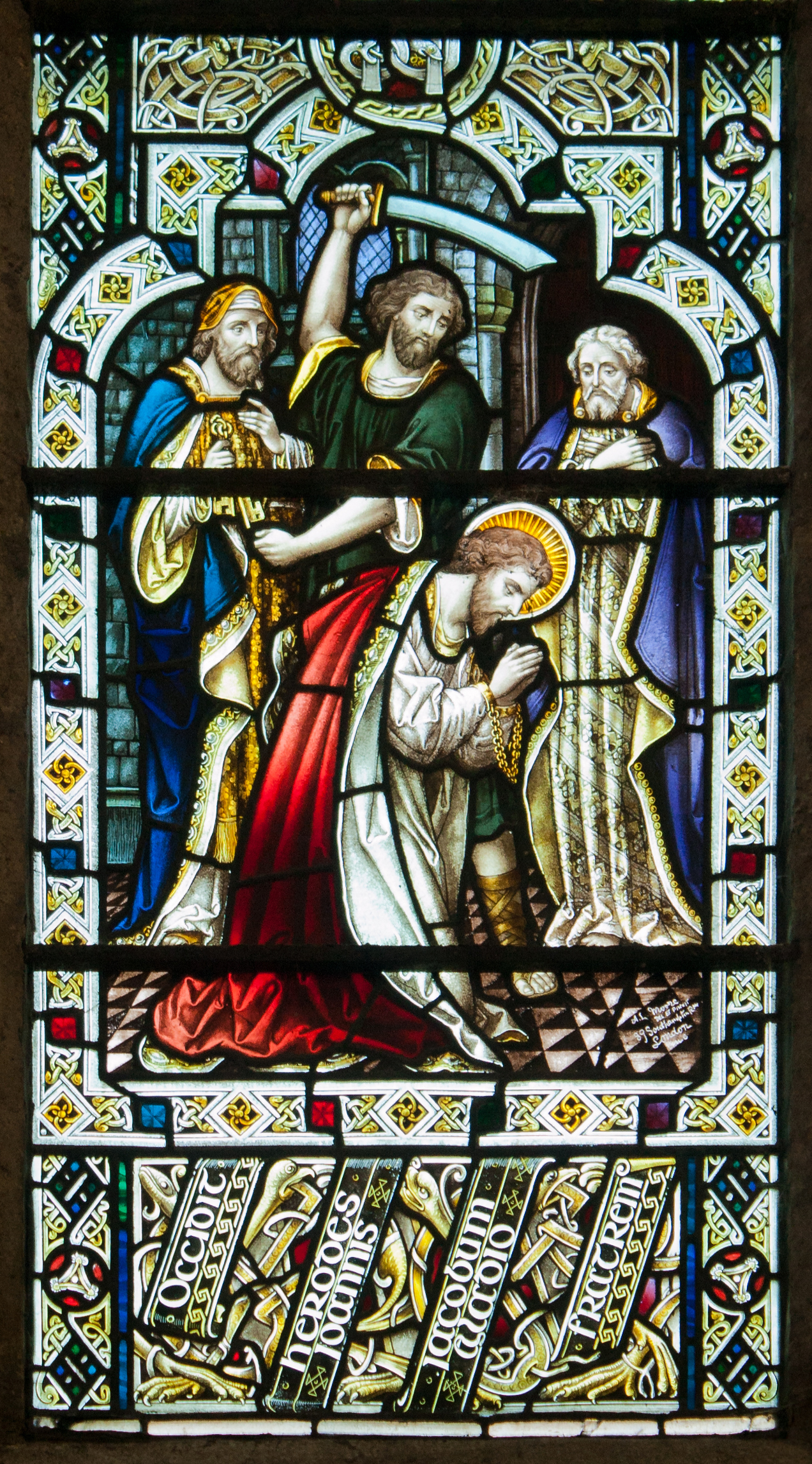
Predella of a window in Kildare Cathedral. 1903

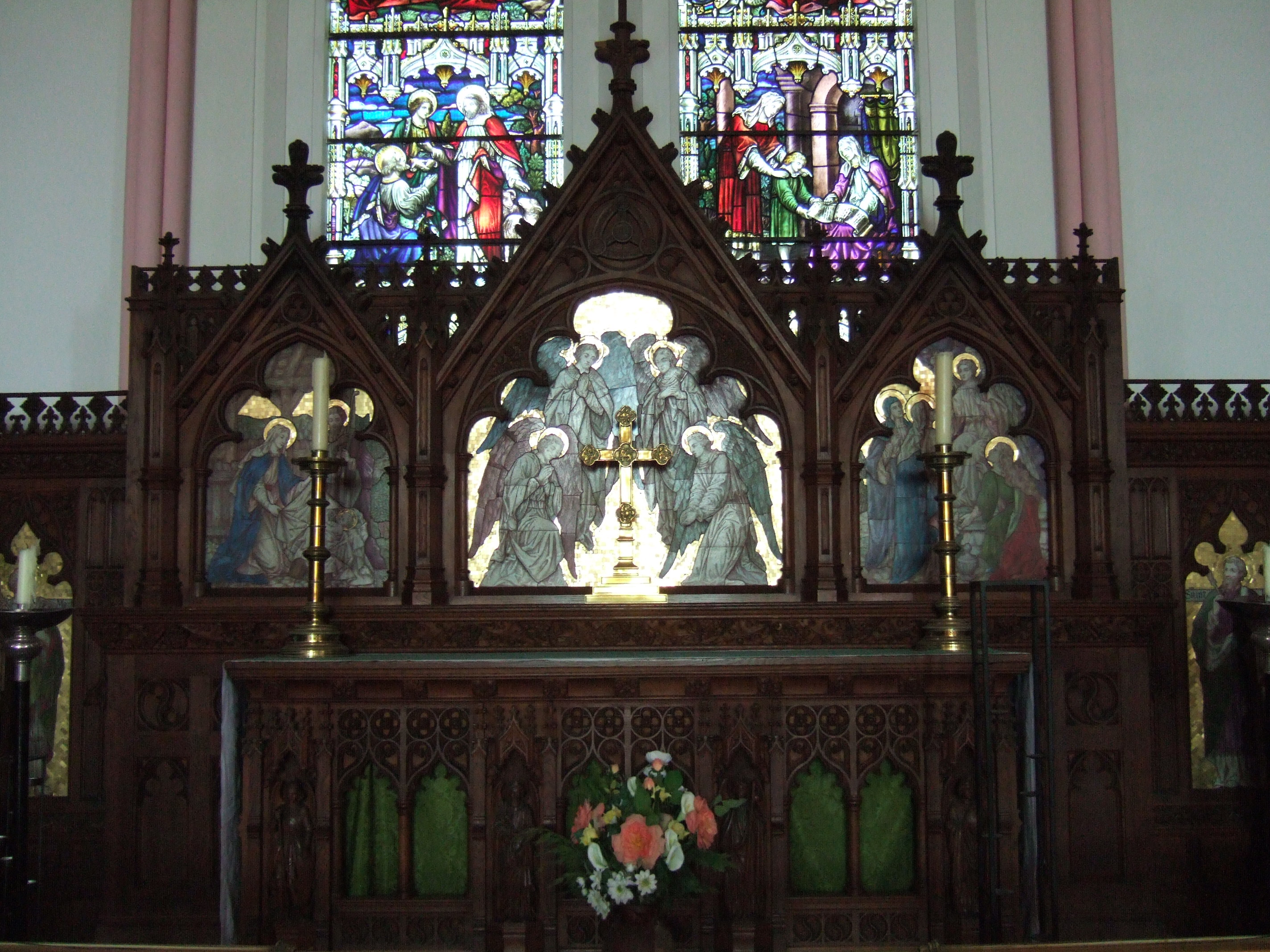
Reredos in All Saints Chapel, Holy Trinity Church Trowbridge. 1914

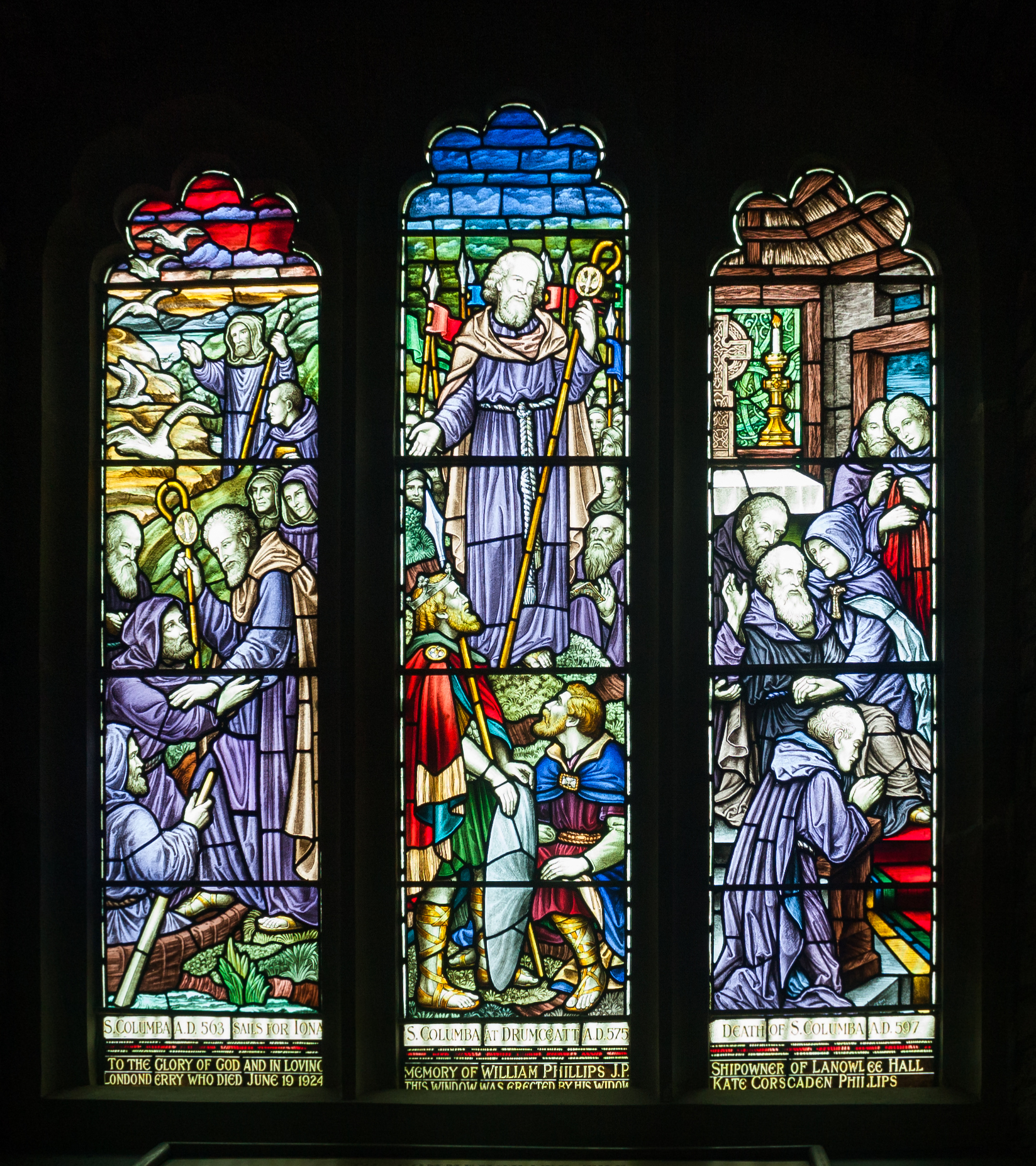
St Columb's Cathedral, 1927
