= George Holdich =

British organist and organ builder (1816–1896)

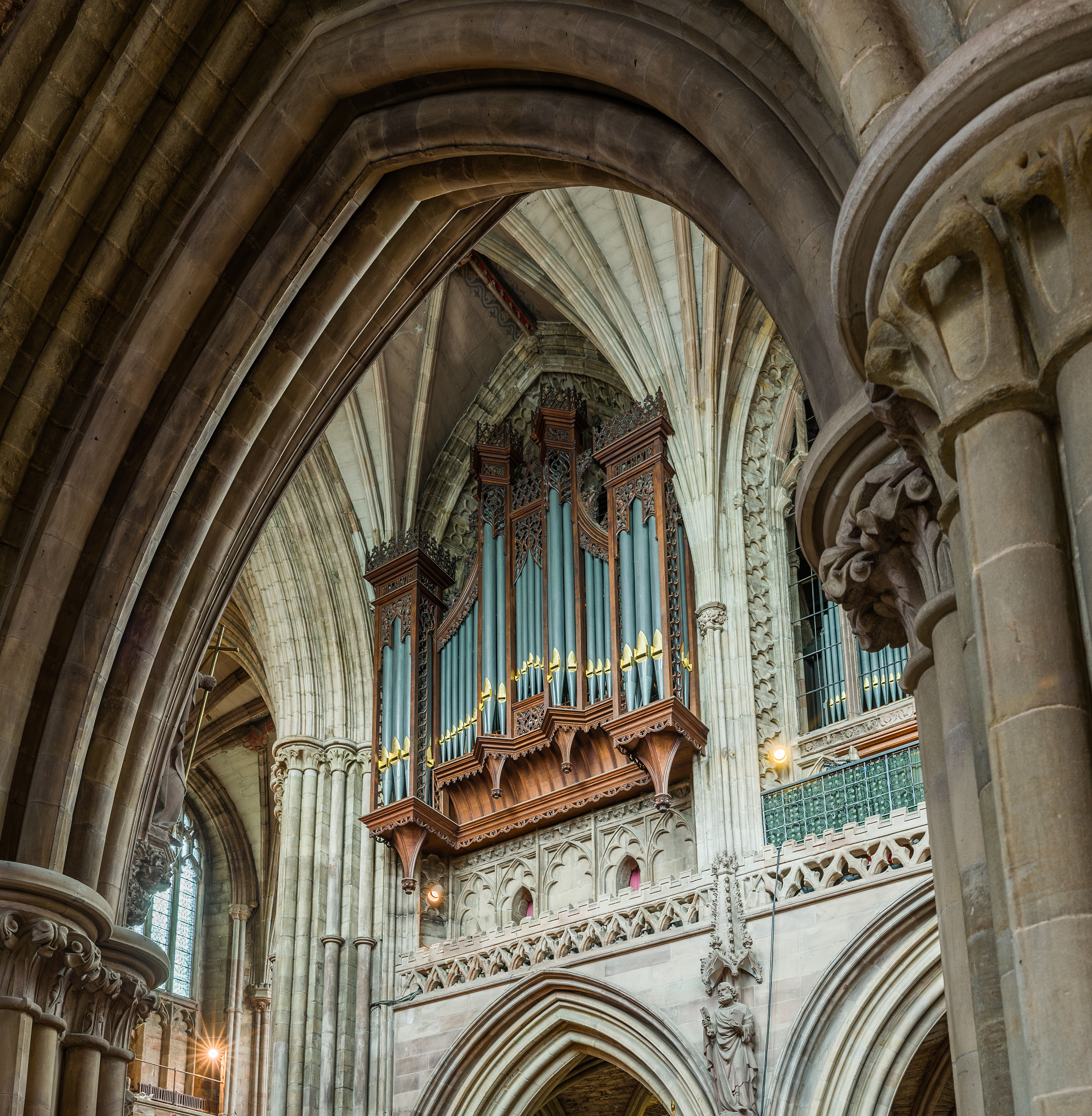
- Lichfield Cathedral Organ
- Born: George Maydwell Holdich; 14 August 1816
- Died: 30 July 1896 (aged 79)
- Education: Cambridge University
- Occupations: Organist; Organ builder
- Organizations: St Peter's Church, Croydon

George Maydwell Holdich (14 August 1816 – 30 July 1896) was a British organist and organ builder based in London.

== Early life ==
Holdich was born on 14 August 1816, the third son of the Revd. Thomas Holdich (Vicar of St Mary the Virgin's Church, Maidwell) and his second wife Elizabeth Laura Maydwell. Col Sir Thomas Holdich, President of the Royal Geographical Society, was his nephew.

He was educated at Uppingham School and Cambridge University, but left to obtain an apprenticeship to the organ builder James Chapman Bishop.

== Career ==
Holdich set up his own business at 12 Greek Street, in the same building as Henry Bevington, and is speculated to have built his first organ in 1837. Alfred Hunter was apprenticed to him. During the 1840s and 1850s he mainly built organs for village churches, but later moved on to larger instruments.

He moved to 4 Judd Place East (renamed 42 Euston Road in 1858) in 1854 and in 1866 to 24 Park Place West, Liverpool Road. He sold this business to Eustace Ingram.

In 1851 he produced an organ which was exhibited at the Great Exhibition. His greatest achievement was the new organ for Lichfield Cathedral in 1861. The instrument, which had 52 stops, was the first in England to have a full pedal specification of stops as was customary among organs in continental Europe. It was rebuilt in 1874 by William Hill and Sons

== Appointments ==
- Organist of St Peter's Church, Croydon
