= Swizzlewick =

1964 British TV comedy drama series

Swizzlewick is a twice weekly 1964 BBC comedy drama series about the day-to-day events of a corrupt local council in a fictional Midlands town. The writers included David Turner who created the series.

This series is principally remembered as an early target of the 'Clean Up TV' campaigner Mary Whitehouse who thought it unsuitable for an early evening audience. An episode in August 1964 featured Mrs Felicity Smallgood, a character parodying her, who was depicted launching a "Freedom from Sex" campaign. A scene with a prostitute was cut from another episode of the series, after a television studio worker leaked an advance copy of the script to her. She was told "It's too late to re-shoot.", and answered "I don't want re-shooting, I want cuts." She delivered a letter of complaint in person to the Postmaster General of the United Kingdom, who appears to have passed the matter on to the BBC, and the scene Mrs Whitehouse found offensive was cut. Turner resigned from the series. A leader in The Times criticised the series for suggesting councillors were less than honest. National critics dismissed the series. The reviewer in The Guardian faulted it for "amateurish performances" and described it as "a new low in tastelessness."

Television programmes from this era were often wiped, discarded or not recorded at all if they went out live. Of 26 episodes, only one is believed to exist.
