= Hopton-on-Sea =

Village in Norfolk, England

Coordinates: 52°32′20″N 1°43′48″E

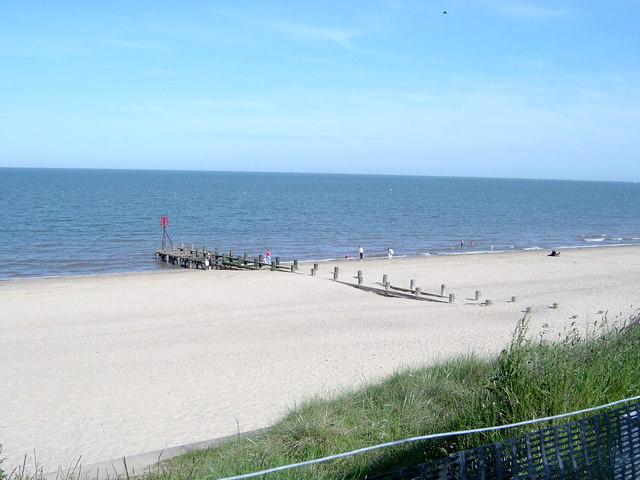
- Hopton beach

- Location within Norfolk
- Area: 2.17 sq mi (5.6 km^{2})
- Population: 2,970 (Census 2011)
  - Density: 1,369/sq mi (529/km^{2})
- OS grid reference: TM5399
- Civil parish: Hopton-on-Sea
- District: Great Yarmouth
- Shire county: Norfolk
- Region: East
- Country: England
- Sovereign state: United Kingdom
- Post town: GREAT YARMOUTH
- Postcode district: NR31
- Dialling code: 01502
- Police: Norfolk
- Fire: Norfolk
- Ambulance: East of England
- UK Parliament: Great Yarmouth

Hopton-on-Sea is a village, civil parish and seaside resort on the coast of East Anglia, in the Great Yarmouth district, in the county of Norfolk, England. It is located 4 miles (6 km) south of Great Yarmouth and 5 miles (8 km) north-west of Lowestoft.

== History ==
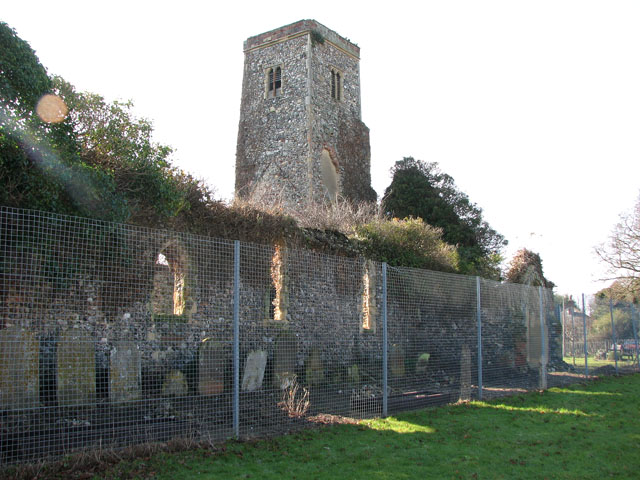
The ruined church of St Margaret, which was destroyed by fire in 1865

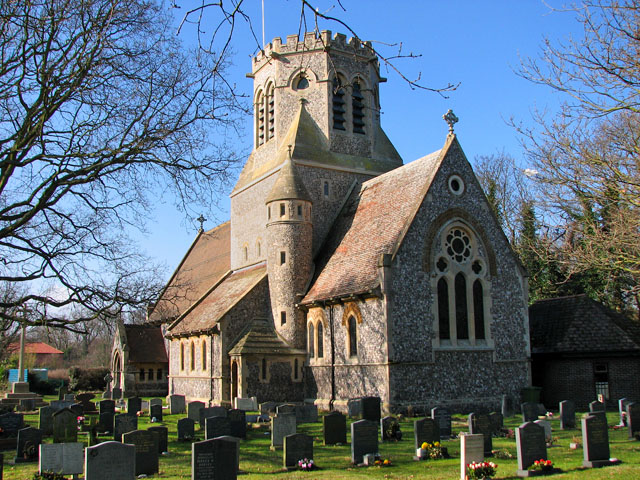
The current St Margaret's church, which dates from 1866

The village's name means "Farm/settlement in enclosed spot"; it is perhaps referring to the promontory jutting into marsh.

The earliest human activity in the parish dates to the Palaeolithic era, with the discovery of flint tools. There have also been artefacts found from the Bronze Age and Roman era in the area.

The oldest building in the parish is the ruin of St Margaret's church, built in the 14th century; it burned down in 1865. The ruins of the old church are being restored to form a cultural centre for the village. As part of the £140,000 restoration project by the Great Yarmouth Preservation Trust, gargoyles were found on the site from the previous 11th century church.

A new church of the same name was built the following year in Early English style on a new site, which is still in use today. Designed by Samuel Sanders Teulon, it contains stained glass by William Morris and Edward Burne-Jones.

During World War II, a dense network of military defences were built in the area due to Hopton's close proximity to Great Yarmouth. These included anti-tank defences, pillboxes, air-raid shelters and a coastal battery. Constructed in 1940, this battery had a pair of large gun houses, four six-inch guns and search-lights. The site was armed during and after the war, until August 1947, due to its prime location for an invasion.

== Geography ==
The village is sited on the East Anglia coast, beside the North Sea; it has a wide sandy beach, Hopton-on-Sea Beach, which runs by grassy cliffs. The beach suffers from coastal erosion and, as of 2016, sand levels have dropped by 10 ft in the last five years. The erosion has led to a project to replace the old wooden groynes, with ones made of rock and the construction of a seawall. These defences are estimated to protect the area for up to a century.

The civil parish was, until 1974, in the county of East Suffolk. It has an area of 2.17 square miles (5.6 km^{2}) and, in the 2011 census, it had a population of 2,970 in 1,325 households. For local government, the parish falls within the district of Great Yarmouth.

== Amenities ==
The village has many amenities for tourists with amusement arcades and food outlets. It is also home to Potters Resorts, "the UK’s only all-inclusive holiday resort", which was founded in 1920. It employs approximately 560 permanent staff, making it the largest private sector employer in the area.

== Transport ==
First Eastern Counties operates local bus services, with routes connecting the village with Norwich, Great Yarmouth and Lowestoft.

Hopton-on-Sea railway station was a stop on the Yarmouth-Lowestoft line, which linked Yarmouth Beach and Lowestoft. The line and the station were closed in 1970, as part of the Beeching Axe.

== Sport ==
Every January, Hopton-on-Sea hosts the World Indoor Bowls Championships at Potters Resorts; players, spectators, the BBC and many others staying in the village for what is regarded as the biggest event in the bowls calendar.

== Notable former residents ==
- Dave Benson Phillips, children's television presenter
- Eddie Large, comedian
- Mark Noble, footballer
- Joe Pasquale, comedian
- Laurie Sivell, footballer

== War Memorial ==
Hopton-on-Sea War Memorial is a large latin cross in St. Margaret's Churchyard which lists the following names for First World War:

Rank	Name	Unit	Date of death	Burial/Commemoration
Maj.	Charles FS Stewart MC	6th Bn., Northamptonshire Regt. (Note: Major Stewart was wounded in 1915 and was then given a posting as Vice-Consul in Las Palmas, Canary Islands. Stewart returned to active service in 1917 and was awarded the Military Cross for leading a trench raid. He was killed in action at Hangaard.)	5 Apr. 1918	Mézières Cemetery
Lt.	Herbert W. J. Orde DSO	HMS Goliath (Battleship) (Note: Lieutenant Orde was awarded the Distinguished Service Order in 1914 for continuing to lead his ship under fire in Dar-es-Salaam Harbour. Orde was killed in the Dardanelles whilst trying to save his men after his ship came under heavy Ottoman fire.)	13 May 1915	Chatham Naval Memorial
Lt.	Adrian H. Stewart	3rd Bn., Nigeria Regiment	29 Aug. 1914	Calabar Memorial
SSgt.	Thomas R. Doggett MM	130th Bty., Royal Garrison Artillery	18 Nov. 1917	Klein Vierstraat Cemetery
LCpl.	William R. Watson	31st (Alberta) Bn., CEF	22 May 1918	Achicourt Road Cemetery
Pte.	Albert H. Adcock MM	1st Bn., Cambridgeshire Regiment	11 Aug. 1918	Ribemont Cemetery
Pte.	Harry B. Moore	1st Bn., Grenadier Guards	30 Mar. 1918	Bucquoy Road Cemetery
Pte.	Charles E. Barber	10th Bn., Lincolnshire Regiment	24 Mar. 1918	Arras Memorial
Pte.	James Frost (Note: Private Frost was discharged from the British Army due to ill-health and passed away of tuberculosis at Ormiston Road Hospital, Derby.)	Middlesex Regiment	27 Jul. 1915	Unknown
Pte.	George Smith	8th Bn., Suffolk Regiment	12 Oct. 1917	Tyne Cot
Dhd.	Samuel R. Wright	H.M. Trawler Hirose (Note: H.M. Trawler Hirose was a Cardiff-built Admiralty Trawler.)	29 Jun. 1916	Chatham Naval Memorial
Dhd.	E. John Adcock	H.M. Trawler Tugela (Note: H.M. Trawler Tugela was a Hull-built trawler which was requisitioned during the conflict. Deckhand Adcock died after drowning in the River Yar.)	29 Feb. 1916	Chatham Naval Memorial
Eng.	Charles W. Brooks	H.M. Trawler Saxon Prince (Note: H.M. Trawler Saxon Prince was a North Shields-built trawler which was requisitioned by the Admiralty.)	28 Mar. 1916	Chatham Naval Memorial

The following names were added after the Second World War:

Rank	Name	Unit	Date of death	Burial/Commemoration
FO	Frank Hill	Air Transport Auxiliary	20 Mar. 1945	St. Margaret's Churchyard
Sgt.	Harry E. Rackham	2nd Bn., Royal Sussex Regt.	26 May 1940	Le Grand Hasard Cemetery
LSgt.	John O. W. Walter	1st Bn., Royal Norfolk Regiment	13 Jun. 1944	La Délivrande War Cemetery
LS	James Crozier	H.M.L.C.S. 258	1 Nov. 1944	Portsmouth Naval Memorial
LCpl.	Gordon F. Ball	4th Bn., Dorsetshire Regiment	3 Aug. 1944	Tilly-sur-Seulles War Cemetery
Pte.	Frederick W. Pearson	2nd Bn., Highland Light Infantry	14 Feb. 1945	Reichswald Forest Cemetery
Eng.	Ambrose Thompson	H.M. Trawler Wallasea	6 Jan. 1944	Penzance Cemetery
Stw.	Percy H. Gosling	H.M. Minesweeper 101	29 Nov. 1944	Lowestoft Naval Memorial
