= Peter Coke =

English actor, playwright and artist (1913–2008)

- Born: 3 April 1913; Southsea, Hampshire, England
- Died: 30 July 2008 (aged 95); Sharrington, Norfolk, England
- Education: Royal Academy of Dramatic Art
- Occupations: Actor, playwright, artist
- Years active: 1937–1988 (as actor and playwright)
- Partner: Fred Webb (died 2003)
- Military career
- Allegiance: United Kingdom
- Branch: British Army
- Rank: Major
- Service number: 228071
- Unit: Royal Artillery
- Conflicts: Second World War

Peter John Coke (/kʊk/ "cook"; 3 April 1913 – 30 July 2008) was an English actor, playwright and artist. He is perhaps best remembered for voicing Paul Temple on BBC Radio from 1954 to 1968.

== Early life ==
Peter John Coke was born in Southsea, Hampshire on 3 April 1913. His father was a commander in the Royal Navy, who took his family to Kenya to run a linen plantation; however, this venture failed and he began to run a coffee plantation. Coke was educated at Stowe School and later lived with his maternal grandmother in Menton, France.

Coke returned to England and took acting lessons from an elderly actress. He later won a scholarship to study at RADA.

== Career ==
Coke graduated from RADA aged 24, and was named one of the Daily Mail's 'Stars of the Future'. He was also reportedly offered a seven-year contract in Hollywood, though declined as he "will be a better actor in a few years, and Hollywood will still want him. If he goes now, he will be forgotten." He starred in Dodie Smith's 1937 play Bonnet Over the Windmill. Coke made his film debut in the comedy Missing, Believed Married (1937) and later starred in The Return of Carol Deane and Keep Smiling (both 1938).

During the Second World War, he served with the Royal Artillery in Italy and reached the rank of major. He was demobbed in 1944 and found that his time away from the cameras had affected his performance. He opened an antiques stall on Portobello Market, later progressing to a shop on New King's Road. He returned to theatre in the late 1940s and, in 1950, he started writing plays as a sideline. His first play, The Isle of Umbrellas (co-written with Mabel L. Tyrell), was produced at the Embassy. Coke portrayed the role of William in the film The Blakes Slept Here released in 1953. In 1954, he became the seventh actor to take the role of Paul Temple in the long-running radio drama series written by Francis Durbridge. The first serial he starred in was Paul Temple and the Gilbert Case. He had played a supporting role, as a character called Terry Palmer, in an earlier episode (1959) of Paul Temple called The Vandyke Affair. He played the role until 1968, when he appeared in Paul Temple and the Alex Affair. Those programmes which survive have been repeated on BBC Radio 4 Extra.

Between 1958 and 1988, he wrote eleven plays, including his best-known, Breath of Spring, which was successful in the West End in 1959. Coke continued to take film roles and television parts until the late 1950s, including a minor role as Lt. Lashwood in Carry on Admiral (US: The Ship Was Loaded, 1957).

Through his work with antiques, he became interested in shell art, and started to produce his own pieces. He had his own personal gallery next to his home at Sharrington Hall in Sharrington, Norfolk, where he worked daily producing pieces. In April 2006, he opened the Peter Coke Shell Gallery in part of the recently restored fishing sheds on West Cliff at Sheringham in north Norfolk.

Coke later exhibited his works at Partridge Fine Art in the 1990s, and at The Fine Art Society in New Bond Street in 2002, and 2004, and at the Sloane Club in Lower Sloane Street in December 2006.

== Personal life ==
Coke lived with his partner Fred Webb, a theatrical lighting engineer, and they collected shells in France and Italy for many years until Webb died in 2003. Coke died aged 95 at Sharrington Hall on 30 July 2008.

== Plays ==
- The Isle of Umbrellas (co-written with Mabel L. Tyrell)
- Breath of Spring (1958)
- Gentle Guardsmen (1961)
- Sleepy Mermaid (1962)
- Fool's Paradise (1963)
- In Confidence (1964)
- Face To Face (1965)
- Midsummer Mink (1965)
- The Man Who Wrote In Bed (1968)
- Taxpayers' Waltz (1970)
- What Are Little Girls Made Of? (1978)
- Autumn Manoeuvres (1983)
- Winter Glory (1988)

== Selected filmography ==
- Missing, Believed Married (1937)
- Keep Smiling (1938)
- Cheer Boys Cheer (1939)
- I Met a Murderer (1939)
- The Broken Horseshoe (1953)
- Gravelhanger (1953; TV show)
- Carry On Admiral (1957)
