= 1863 in literature =

This article contains information about the literary events and publications of 1863.

== Events ==
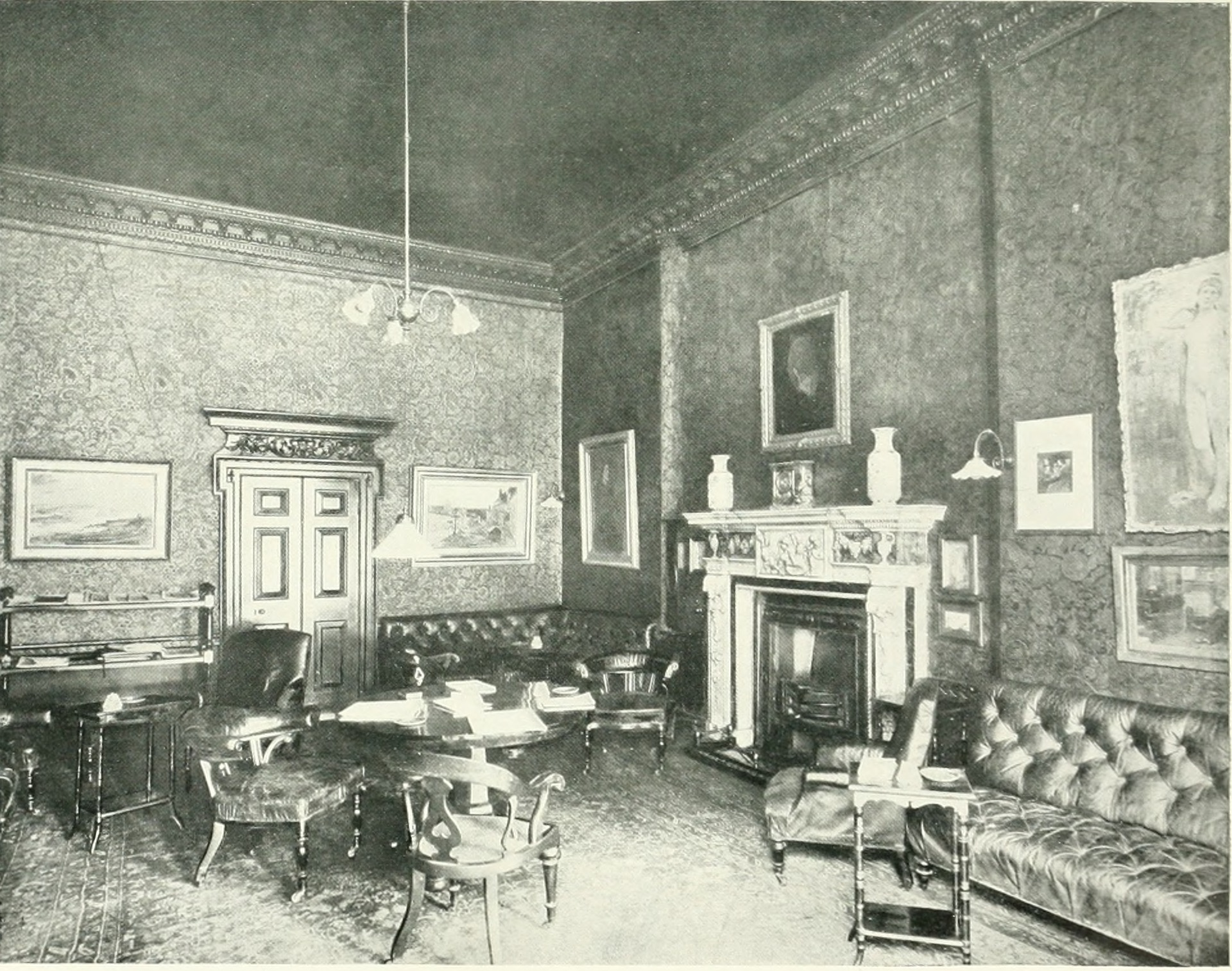
c. 1920 photograph of The Arts Club

- January 1 – The essayist and poet Ralph Waldo Emerson commemorates that day's Emancipation Proclamation in the United States by composing "Boston Hymn" and surprising a crowd of 3,000 with a debut reading of it at Boston Music Hall.
- January 31 – Jules Verne's novel Five Weeks in a Balloon, or, Journeys and Discoveries in Africa by Three Englishmen (Cinq semaines en ballon) is published by Pierre-Jules Hetzel in Paris. It will be the first of Verne's Voyages extraordinaires (French: Extraordinary Voyages or Amazing Journeys) .According to Verne's editor Pierre-Jules Hetzel, the goal of the Voyages was "to outline all the geographical, geological, physical, historical and astronomical knowledge amassed by modern science and to recount, in an entertaining and picturesque format ... the history of the universe."
- February 3 – Samuel Langhorne Clemens, in signing a humorous letter to the Territorial Enterprise newspaper in Virginia City, Nevada, first uses the pen name Mark Twain.
- February 28 – Flaubert and Turgenev meet for the first time, in Paris.
- June 12 – The Arts Club is founded by Charles Dickens, Anthony Trollope, Frederic Leighton and others in London's Mayfair, as a social meeting place for those involved or interested in the creative arts.
- June 13 – Samuel Butler's dystopian article "Darwin among the Machines" is published (as by "Cellarius") in The Press newspaper in Christchurch, New Zealand; it will be incorporated into his novel Erewhon (1872).
- November – Mendele Mocher Sforim's first Yiddish language story, "Dos Kleine Menshele" (The Little Man), is published in the Odessa weekly Kol Mevasser.
- December 29 – An estimated 7000 people attend the funeral of William Makepeace Thackeray at Kensington Gardens and nearly 2000 his burial in London's Kensal Green Cemetery.
- unknown dates
  - The Freies Deutsches Hochstift association acquires the Goethe House (his 1749 birthplace) in Frankfurt am Main.
  - The Romanian Junimea literary society is established in Iași. It will exercise a major influence on Romanian culture until the 1910s.
  - Elvira, or the Love of a Tyrant, a novel by the Neapolitan author Giuseppe Folliero de Luna, becomes the first published in the Maltese language, as Elvira Jew Imħabba ta’ Tirann.
  - Peruvian writer Ricardo Palma begins periodical publication of his Peruvian Traditions (Tradiciones peruanas).
  - Publication begins in the U.K. of a seminal edition of The Works of William Shakespeare (the "Cambridge Shakespeare"), edited by William George Clark and William Aldis Wright, published by Macmillan and printed by Cambridge University Press.

== New books ==
=== Fiction ===
- William Harrison Ainsworth – Cardinal Pole
- Mary Elizabeth Braddon
  - Aurora Floyd
  - Eleanor's Victory
  - John Marchman's Legacy
- Nikolai Chernyshevsky – What Is to Be Done? (‹Что делать?›, Shto delat'?)
- George Eliot – Romola
- "Charles Felix" (probably Charles Warren Adams) – The Notting Hill Mystery (serialization completed, book form; considered first full-length detective novel in English)
- Elizabeth Gaskell
  - A Dark Night's Work
  - Sylvia's Lovers
- Théophile Gautier – Captain Fracasse
- Edward Everett Hale – The Man Without a Country
- Mary Jane Holmes – Marian Grey
- Jean Ingelow – "The Prince's Dream" (short story)
- Julia Kavanagh – Queen Mab
- Sheridan Le Fanu – The House by the Churchyard
- John Neal — The White-Faced Pacer, or, Before and After the Battle
- Margaret Oliphant – Salem Chapel, first of The Chronicles of Carlingford (in book form)
- Ouida – Held in Bondage
- Charles Reade – Very Hard Cash (later Hard Cash)
- Miguel Riofrío – La Emancipada (the first Ecuadorian novel)
- Anne Thackeray Ritchie – The Story of Elizabeth
- Leo Tolstoy – The Cossacks: A Caucasus Tale of 1852 (‹Казаки›, Kazaki)
- Anthony Trollope
  - Rachel Ray
  - The Small House at Allington (serialization continues)
- John Townsend Trowbridge – Cudjo's Cave
- Giovanni Verga – Sulle Lagune (In the Lagoons)

=== Children and young people ===
- Charles Kingsley – The Water-Babies, A Fairy Tale for a Land Baby (complete in book form)
- Jules Verne – Five Weeks in a Balloon

=== Drama ===
- W. S. Gilbert – Uncle Baby
- Tom Taylor – The Ticket-of-Leave Man

=== Poetry ===
- Rosalía de Castro – Cantares gallegos
- Henry Wadsworth Longfellow – Tales of a Wayside Inn, including "Paul Revere's Ride"

=== Non-fiction ===
- John Austin (posthumously, compiled by Sarah Austin) – Lectures on Jurisprudence
- Samuel Bache – Miracles the Credentials of the Christ
- William Barnes – Glossary of Dorset Dialect
- Henry Walter Bates – The Naturalist on the River Amazons.
- William Wells Brown – The Black Man: His Antecedents, His Genius and His Achievements
- Francis James Child – Observations on the Language of Chaucer's Canterbury Tales
- Gustav Freytag – Die Technik des Dramas
- Alexander Gilchrist (posthumously, edited by Anne Gilchrist) – Life of William Blake, "Pictor Ignotus"; with selections from his poems and other writings
- William Howitt – History of the Supernatural
- Fanny Kemble – Journal of a Residence on a Georgian Plantation in 1838–1839
- Abraham Lincoln – The Gettysburg Address
- Charles Lyell – Geological Evidences of the Antiquity of Man
- Ernest Renan – The Life of Jesus (Vie de Jésus)

== Births ==
- February 9 – Anthony Hope (Anthony Hope Hawkins), English novelist and playwright (died 1933)
- February 14 – Virginia Frazer Boyle, American author, poet (died 1938)
- March 3 – Arthur Machen (Arthur Llewellyn Jones), Welsh novelist and short story writer (died 1947)
- March 9 — Emelie Tracy Y. Swett, American author (d. 1892)
- March 12 – Gabriele D'Annunzio, Italian poet (died 1938)
- March 17 – Olivia Shakespear (née Tucker), British novelist, playwright and patron of the arts (died 1938)
- April 9 – Henry De Vere Stacpoole, Irish novelist (died 1951)
- April 20 — Helen Dortch Longstreet, American social advocate, librarian, and newspaper woman (died 1962)
- April 26 – Arno Holz, German Naturalist poet and dramatist (died 1929)
- April 29 – Constantine Cavafy, Greek Alexandrine poet (died 1933)
- May 27 – Matthew J. Royal, Canadian novelist and playwright (died 1900)
- June 10 – Louis Couperus, Dutch fiction writer (died 1923)
- June 20 – Florence White, English food writer (died 1940)
- July 13 – Margaret Murray, Indian-born English archeologist and historian (died 1963)
- August 7 – Gene Stratton Porter, American novelist and naturalist (died 1924)
- August 31 – Marion Foster Washburne, American author, journalist, editor, lecturer, and educator (died 1944)
- September 1 – Violet Jacob (Violet Kennedy-Erskine), Scottish historical novelist and poet (died 1946)
- September 8 – W. W. Jacobs, English short story writer (died 1943)
- September 22 – Ferenc Herczeg (Franz Herzog), Hungarian dramatist (died 1954)
- November 1
  - Charlotte O'Conor Eccles, Irish-born London writer, translator and journalist (died 1911)
  - Arthur Morrison, English writer (died 1945)
- November 18 – Richard Dehmel, German poet (died 1920)
- November 21 – Sir Arthur Quiller-Couch (Q.), English novelist and anthologist (died 1944)
- December 16 – George Santayana, American novelist and poet (died 1952)

== Deaths ==
- May 13 – August Hahn, German Protestant theologian (born 1792)
- July 3 – William Barksdale, American journalist and Confederate general (killed in action, born 1821
- July 10 – Clement Clarke Moore, American classicist and poet (born 1779)
- September 17 – Alfred de Vigny, French poet, dramatist and novelist (born 1797)
- September 20 – Jacob Grimm, German philologist and fairy-tale author (born 1785)
- October 6 – Frances Trollope, English novelist and writer (born 1779)
- October 8 – Richard Whately, English theologian and archbishop (born 1787)
- December 13 – Christian Friedrich Hebbel, German poet and dramatist (born 1813)
- December 17 – Émile Saisset, French philosopher (born 1814)
- December 24 – William Makepeace Thackeray, Indian-born English novelist and travel writer (stroke, born 1811)

== Awards ==
- Newdigate Prize – Thomas Llewellyn Thomas
