= Edward Wilkins =

Edward Wilkins may refer to:

- Edward Wilkins, namesake of Edwardsport, Indiana
- Edward Wilkins, character in A Dark Night's Work
- Edward Wilkins (cricketer) (1835–1921), later "Wilkins-Leir", English cricketer and clergyman

== See also ==
- Edward G. Wilkin, US soldier
- Edward Wilkins Waite, landscape painter
- Ted Wilkins, Edwin Wilkins, English rugby league footballer of the 1950s
- Eddie Lee Wilkins, basketball player
