= Eccles on Sea =

Village in Norfolk, England

Coordinates: 52.8070°N 1.56990°E

Eccles-on-Sea
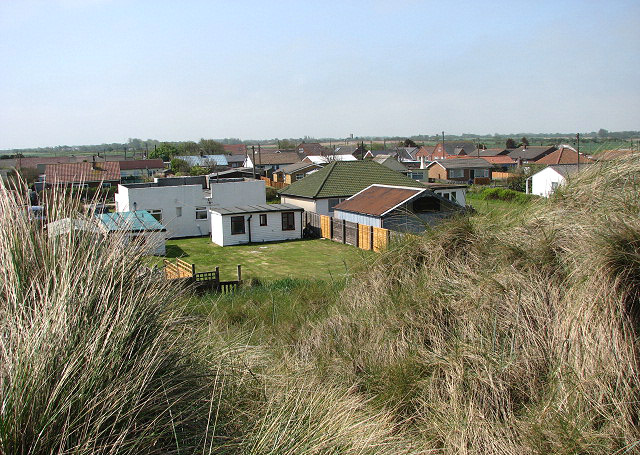
- View across the Bush Estate from the dunes

- Location within Norfolk
- OS grid reference: TG407292
- Civil parish: Lessingham
- District: North Norfolk
- Shire county: Norfolk
- Region: East
- Country: England
- Sovereign state: United Kingdom
- Post town: Norwich
- Postcode district: NR12

Eccles-on-Sea (also called Eccles-by-the-Sea) is an ancient fishing village in north-east Norfolk, now virtually all swept into the North Sea. The population is included in the civil parish of Lessingham.

== History ==
The place name Eccles comes from the Latin ecclesia meaning church, and usually indicates an early British Christian site, for ecclesia was not taken into the Anglo-Saxons' vocabulary other than in inherited place names. When the Domesday Book was compiled in 1086, Eccles-on-Sea was a thriving community of around 2,000 acres (8.1 km^{2}), but, situated in a low-lying area on the North Norfolk coast, it was prone to inundation.

In 1605, according to William White's History, Gazetteer, and Directory of Norfolk, 1883, the inhabitants petitioned for a reduction in their taxes when only 14 houses and 300 acres (120 ha) of land remained following a ferocious storm in 1604. However, this 1604 date cannot be verified by reference to the storm record, and probate evidence clearly demonstrates that by the early 17th century Eccles had been united with Hempstead for some thirty years.

By 1881 it had only 17 inhabitants and comprised 253 acres (102 ha) of land divided into two farms.

Today the majority of the area is occupied by the Bush Estate; a collection of about 200 mostly pre-war bungalows tucked in behind the sand dunes. The Bush Estate was originally a holiday retreat, with just one well between the inhabitants and no mains drainage or power.

However, over the years the properties have been improved, the utility companies subsequently laid on mains drainage, electricity and telephones, and the community took on a more permanent feel. Today about half the dwellings are occupied all year round, and many of the more temporary structures have been rebuilt as conventional bungalows.

The community at Eccles is now nestled behind concrete sea defences constructed after the North Sea flood of 1953.

== Church of St Mary ==
The circa 12th-century round-tower church of Eccles St Mary next the Sea was badly damaged by storms in 1570, with the nave and chancel dismantled soon afterward. The parish of Eccles St Mary was combined with neighbouring Hempstead St Andrew by a Deed of Union dated January 1571. The church steeple, comprising a basal round tower surmounted by an octagonal belfry, was not demolished in recognition of its usefulness as a seamark, and perhaps as a lighthouse. Thereafter Eccles became part of the combined parish of Hempstead with Eccles, although rectors continued to be appointed to St Mary's until the late 19th century as a sinecure, defined as 'a Rectory without cure of souls'.

The steeple remained close to the foreshore, often surrounded by sand dunes, for some 350 years, although coast erosion continued to affect the area throughout that time. In 1605 the villagers applied for a reduction of taxes in a document entitled 'the ruynated state of the town of Eccles' explaining that some 2,000 acres of land and 66 households had been lost to the sea by that time.

By the early 19th century the sea advanced, chewing ever more land away and the sand dunes were pushed back around the church. When Robert Ladbrooke engraved the tower for his series of illustrations of the churches of Norfolk in 1823, the tower was still, just, on the landward side of the dunes. By 1893, the church was not only on the beach, the chancel ruins had been destroyed. That the tower stood until 1895 and formed such a local landmark made it an attraction for early photographers and so we have a number of early plates, most notably the fine image taken by a Norwich photographer called Fitt, c.1890, and which was reproduced and sold in some numbers by him after the tower fell. it has been possible to show that the parish church was originally a two-celled building which had a round west tower, and a south aisle subsequently added. The tower is difficult to date, but from its size, proportions and coursed flint walling, appears to be Norman in date, probably of the 12th century. In January 1913, a large storm reportedly exposed much of the church and the village of Eccles.

It was said that in the 1960s the location of the church was obvious from two large piles of flint, but they are covered by sand today. For 15 years from the mid-1980s the site of Eccles, by then designated as the Eccles Deserted Medieval Village, was exposed by beach scours, most notably in 1991 and 1993. An archaeological watching brief undertaken at the time identified the church ruins, evidence of burials, ancient trackways and foundations of former dwellings in the vicinity of the church, including some dozen abandoned water wells. Excavation of these wells produced a wide range of metal, leather, timber and pottery all dateable to the late 16th century, indicating that the village had been abandoned at that time.

Norfolk County Council Archive has a few Victorian prints showing the tower still standing; examples can be seen on the Norfolk County Council website. A beach service is held on the last Sunday in August every year on the beach near North Gap, Eccles to remember the old church and the people who are buried there.
