= A Lost Wand =

1872 short story by Jean Ingelow

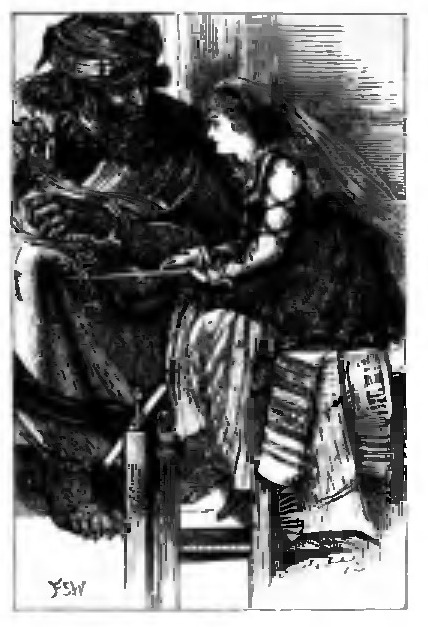
Illustration from The Little Wonder Horn by Frances Walker

"A Lost Wand" is a fairy tale written by Jean Ingelow. It was first published in 1872 as part of The Little Wonder Horn, and later republished as one of the stories in Wonder-Box Tales in 1902. The story revolves around Hulda, a lucky young girl in Norway who receives the opportunity to be granted a wish after finding a ring in her slice of cake.

== Summary ==
After finding a magical ring in her slice of cake, Hulda is given the opportunity to make a wish. A fairy appears from the flower on top of the cake, and tells Hulda she will give her anything she wishes for. Unknowing of what her wish would bring, she asks for the fairy's wand. After handing Hulda her beautiful gold wand, the fairy is stripped of her powers and will ultimately be held at the will of her enemy if she doesn't one day retrieve the wand. It could not be returned immediately, it had to be on a midsummers day. Until then, the fairy requested that Hulda keep it safe for her while she was gone. Days passed and the fairy had never returned, this left Hulda believing that the fairy had died. Then a dishonest guest paid a visit to Hulda and convinced her to trade the wand for a piece of his beautiful jewelry. After trading the wand for a bracelet with a bird clasp, Hulda realizes her visitor was actually a gnome. The gnome was the enemy the fairy had been worried about; with the wand in his possession he would make the fairy his slave. Hulda was aware she made a mistake, and did not rest until she retrieved the gold wand and returned it to the fairy. Not only did she give the fairy her powers back, but also in turn she saved her own life.

== History and origin ==
"A Lost Wand" was written in the mid-1800s. Much of Ingelow's literature was influenced by the writings of Lewis Carroll and George Macdonald. Her stories were written specifically for children, not so much to teach a lesson; but for entertainment, which was a relatively new concept during this time period.

== Characters ==
=== Hulda ===
Hulda is a young girl from Norway whose world is turned upside down after being granted a wish by a fairy. After receiving her wish, she regrets ever making it. She spends the next few years of her life trying to undo what she asked for. Her genuine, courageous attitude is what ultimately helps her catch the enemy and relieve the fairy of Hulda's unfortunate wish.

=== The Fairy ===
The reason for the fairy's existence is to better the lives of mortals, which she does by granting them one wish. After an unfortunate wish is made by a young girl Hulda, the fairy is stripped of her powers and held at the will of her enemy she goes into hiding. Her hopeful outlook on the situation however is the guidance that the little girl Hulda needed to retrieve what she had once lost for the fairy.

=== The Peddler (Gnome) ===
The gnome is a creature covered in dirt and earthly material. Although he disguised himself as "The Peddler", he was still the known enemy of the fairy. His devious, evil ways almost stripped the fairy of her powers for good. His bad intentions did not go unpunished; in the end it is always those with kindness in mind who prosper.
