= Francis S. Walker =

Irish painter, illustrator and etcher (1848–1916)

- Born: 1848; County Meath, Ireland
- Died: 17 April 1916 (aged 67–68); London
- Known for: Painting, illustrating and etching

Francis Sylvester Walker (1848–17 April 1916) was an Irish painter, illustrator and etcher.

== Life ==
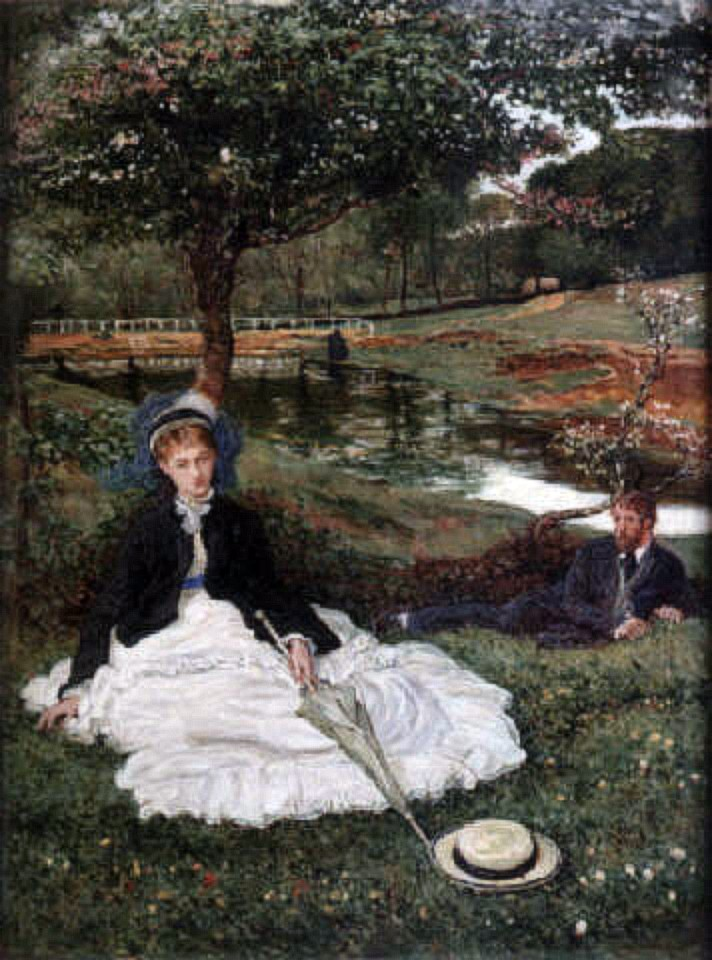
"A spring afternoon in the park"

Walker was the eldest son of Thomas Walker, Master of the Workhouse at Dunshaughlin, and Ann Delany of Clavistown Mills, Killmessan, County Meath.

He studied art at both the Royal Dublin Society (RDS) and the Royal Hibernian Academy (RHA) in Dublin, exhibiting at the RHA from 1863 until his death in 1916. In total, he exhibited 122 works with the RHA. He became an associate of the RHA in 1878, and a member in 1879. He won the Taylor Prize for his painting, The Good Samaritan, in 1864. He worked as an assistant teacher in the Dublin Metropolitan School of Art in 1867.

Walker moved to London in 1868, taking up a post as a wood engraver with the Dalziel Brothers. From around 1880, he started to produce etchings, and was elected a member to the Royal Society of Painter-Etchers in 1897. Walker painted landscapes, portraits and genre works and provided illustrations for various travel books. He worked for periodicals including The Graphic and The Illustrated London News.

In 1905, he exhibited at Burlington House, and in various cities in Britain including Birmingham, Liverpool, and Glasgow. He also became a member of the Royal Society of Painter-Etchers and Engravers (RE).

Walker died on 17 April 1916, unmarried.

His works are currently held in the collections of the National Gallery of Ireland in Dublin, the British Museum and Victoria and Albert Museum in London. The collection held by the British Museum was donated by his daughters after his death.

== Illustrated books ==
- Mathew, Frank (1905) Ireland.
- Senior, William. The Thames: from Oxford to the Tower (John C. Nimmo. 1891)
- Lang, Andrew (Ed.) Poets' country (London, Edinburgh: T.C. & E.C. Jack, 1907).
- Tynan, Katherine. Ireland (London: Adam and Charles Black, 1909).
- Hall, Mr. & Mrs. S. C. Ireland: its scenery, character and history: Volume 1, Volume 2, Volume 3, Volume 4, Volume 5, Volume 6 (Boston: Niccolls & co., 1911).
- Besant, Sir Walter. South London (London: Chatto & Windus, 1912).
- Besant, Sir Walter. "Westminster" (London: Chatto & Windus, 1895).
