= Jean Ingelow =

English poet and novelist (1820–1897)

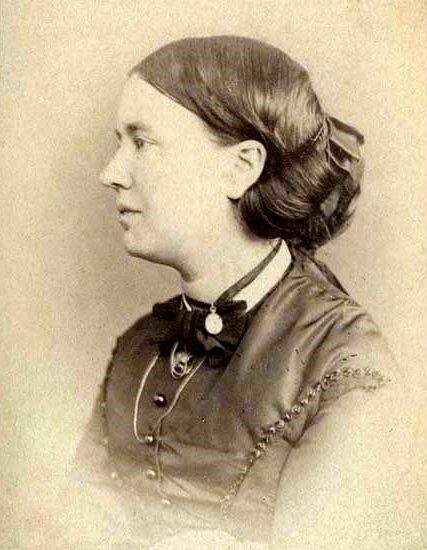
- Jean Ingelow by Elliott & Fry (1860s)
- Born: 17 March 1820; Boston, Lincolnshire, United Kingdom
- Died: 20 July 1897 (aged 77); Kensington, London, United Kingdom
- Occupations: Poet and novelist
- Writing career
- Pen name: Orris

Signature
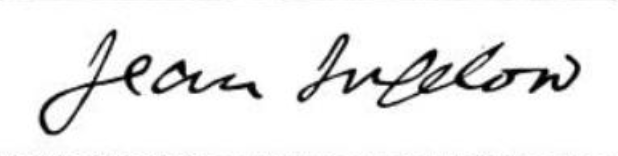

Jean Ingelow (17 March 1820 – 20 July 1897) was an English poet and novelist, who gained sudden fame in 1863. She also wrote several stories for children.

== Early life ==
Born in Boston, Lincolnshire on 17 March 1820, Jean Ingelow was the daughter of William Ingelow, a banker. The family moved to Ipswich when she was 14. Her father was manager of the Ipswich and Suffolk Banking Company, and the family lived in accommodation above the bank at 2 Elm Street. After the bank failed, her family moved out and an arch was built leading to Arcade Street. A blue plaque commemorating her has been installed and nearby Ingelow Street is named after her. A younger brother was the architect Benjamin Ingelow.

Using the pseudonym Oris, Jean Ingelow contributed verses and tales to magazines as a girl, but her first volume, A Rhyming Chronicle of Incidents and Feelings, only appeared anonymously with an established London publisher when she was in her 30th year. This was described as charming by Alfred Tennyson, who said he would like to know the author. They later became friends.

== Professional life ==
Ingelow followed this in 1851 with a story, "Allerton and Dreux", but it was the publication of her Poems in 1863 that suddenly made her popular. It ran rapidly through numerous editions and was set to music, proving popular as domestic entertainment. The collection was said to have sold 200,000 copies. Her writings often focus on religious introspection. In 1867 she edited, with Dora Greenwell, A Story of Doom and other Poems, a poetry collection for children.

Ingelow's work also gained public acclaim in the United States.

At that point, Ingelow gave up verse for a while and became industrious as a novelist. Off the Skelligs appeared in 1872, Fated to be Free in 1873, Sarah de Berenger in 1880, and John Jerome in 1886. She also wrote Studies for Stories (1864), Stories told to a Child (1865), Mopsa the Fairy (1869), and other stories for children, which were influenced by Lewis Carroll and George MacDonald. Mopsa the Fairy, about a boy who discovers a nest of fairies and discovers a fairyland while riding on the back of an albatross, was one of her most popular works (reprinted in 1927 with illustrations by Dorothy P. Lathrop). Anne Thaxter Eaton, writing in A Critical History of Children's Literature, calls it "a well-constructed tale" with "charm and a kind of logical make-believe." Her third series of Poems was published in 1885.

Jean Ingelow's last years were spent in Kensington. By then she had outlived her popularity as a poet. She died in 1897 and was buried in Brompton Cemetery, London.

== Criticism ==
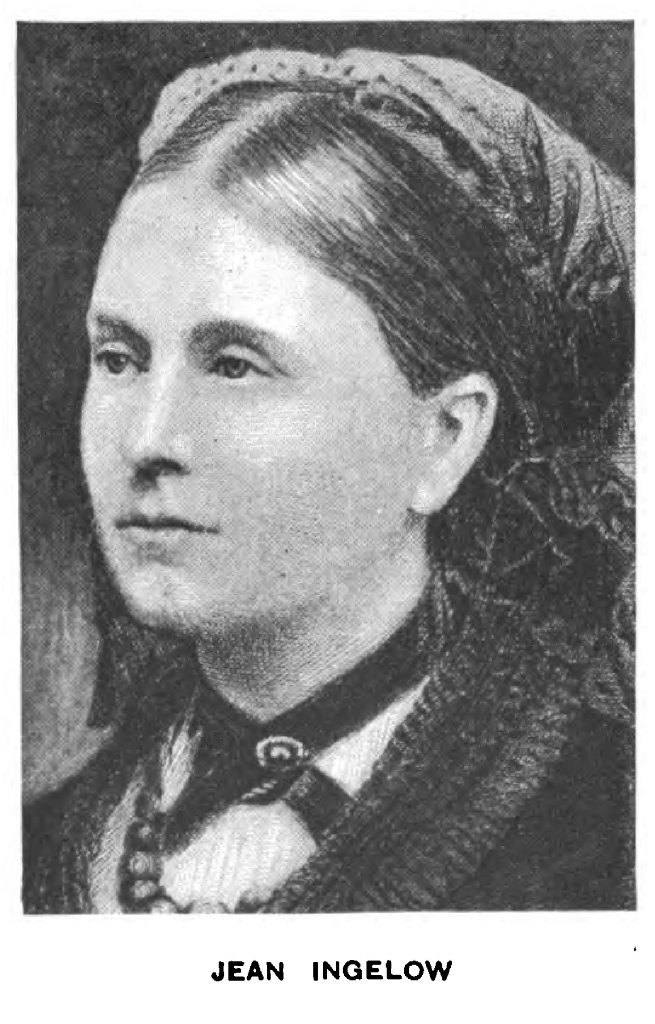

Ingelow's poems, collected in one volume in 1898, had frequently been popular successes. "Sailing beyond Seas" and "When Sparrows build in Supper at the Mill" were among the most popular songs of the day. Her best-known poems include "The High Tide on the Coast of Lincolnshire, 1571" and "Divided".

Many of her contemporaries defended her work. Gerald Massey described The High Tide on the Coast of Lincolnshire as "a poem full of power and tenderness". Susan Coolidge remarked in a preface to an anthology of Ingelow's poems, "She stood amid the morning dew/And sang her earliest measure sweet/Sang as the lark sings, speeding fair/to touch and taste the purer air." "Sailing beyond Seas" (or "The Dove on the Mast") was a favourite poem of Agatha Christie, who quoted it in two novels, The Moving Finger and Ordeal by Innocence. American composer Emily Bruce Roelofson used Ingelow’s text for her song “I Leaned Out of Windows”.

Yet the wider literary world largely dismissed her. The Cambridge History of English and American Literature, for example, wrote: "If we had nothing of Jean Ingelow’s but the most remarkable poem entitled Divided, it would be permissible to suppose the loss [of her], in fact or in might-have-been, of a poetess of almost the highest rank.... Jean Ingelow wrote some other good things, but nothing at all equalling this; while she also wrote too much and too long." Some of this criticism has overtones of dismissing her as a female writer: "Unless a man is an extraordinary coxcomb, a person of private means, or both, he seldom has the time and opportunity of committing, or the wish to commit, bad or indifferent verse for a long series of years; but it is otherwise with woman."

There have been many parodies of her poetry, noting her archaisms, flowery language and perceived sentimentality. These include "Lovers, and a Reflexion" by Charles Stuart Calverley and "Supper at the Kind Brown Mill", a parody of her "Supper at the Mill", which appears in Gilbert Sorrentino's satirical novel Blue Pastoral (1983).

== Works ==
- Works by Jean Ingelow at Project Gutenberg
- Mopsa the Fairy at A Celebration of Women Writers
- A Lost Wand
- The Prince's Dream
- Gems From Jean Ingelow

== Legacy ==
Rudyard Kipling's short story "My Son's Wife" refers to "The High Tide on the Coast of Lincolnshire, 1571". A reading of the same poem forms a scene in chapter 7 of D. H. Lawrence's Sons and Lovers.

The novelist Maureen Peters wrote Jean Ingelow: Victorian Poetess (1972).

The city of Enderby, British Columbia, in Canada was named in 1887 after a reading of "The High Tide on the Coast of Lincolnshire, 1571", and Ingelow, Manitoba, is named for her. There is an Ingelow Road in Battersea, London.
