= St Andrew's Church, Hempstead =

St Andrew, Hempstead
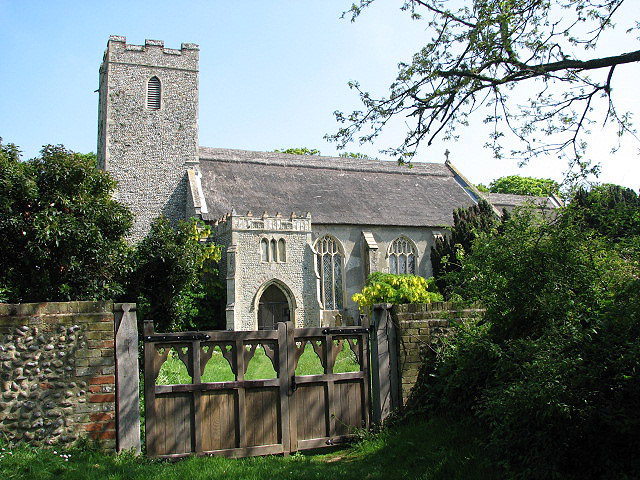
- St Andrew's seen from the southwest

- Location within Norfolk
- 52.7996°N 1.5637°E
- OS grid reference: TG 40334 28407
- Location: Hempstead, near Stalham, Norfolk
- Country: England
- Denomination: Church of England

History
- Status: parish church
- Dedication: St Andrew

Architecture
- Functional status: Active
- Heritage designation: Grade II*
- Designated: 16 April 1955
- Style: Gothic
- Years built: 13th–15th centuries

Specifications
- Materials: flint walls, ashlar quoins, thatched roofs

Administration
- Province: Canterbury
- Diocese: Norwich
- Deanery: St Benet at Waxham & Tunstead

St Andrew's Church, Hempstead is the Church of England parish church of Hempstead, near Stalham, Norfolk, England. Hempstead is in Lessingham civil parish about 7 1/2 miles (12 km) east of North Walsham and 1/2 mile (800 m) from the North Sea coast.

The church is a Grade II* listed building.

== History ==
The oldest part of the church is the chancel, which was built in the 13th century. The nave was built in the 14th century. The nave used to have aisles, but these were demolished in the 15th century. In the 15th century the west tower was built and a wooden tracery screen was inserted in the chancel arch.

The upper part of the chancel screen has Perpendicular Gothic tracery of an unusual type. The lower part has two rows of eight panels which had 15th-century paintings of saints, most of which survive. In February 1982 a thief using a screwdriver removed a panel bearing a painting of Saint Eligius from the screen. The panel has never been recovered.

The pulpit and reading desk are 17th-century.

The west tower has three bells. The second bell was cast by an unknown founder at the end of the 14th century. Brasyers of Norwich cast the tenor bell at the end of the 15th century. Thomas Newman of Norwich cast the treble bell in 1707.
