= Boston Hymn =

Poem

"Boston Hymn" (full title: "Boston Hymn, Read in Music Hall, January 1, 1863") is a poem by the American essayist and poet Ralph Waldo Emerson. Emerson composed the poem in late 1862 and read it publicly in Boston Music Hall on January 1, 1863. It commemorates the Emancipation Proclamation issued earlier that day by President Abraham Lincoln, tying it and the broader campaign for the abolition of slavery to the Puritan notion of sacred destiny for America.

== Political context ==
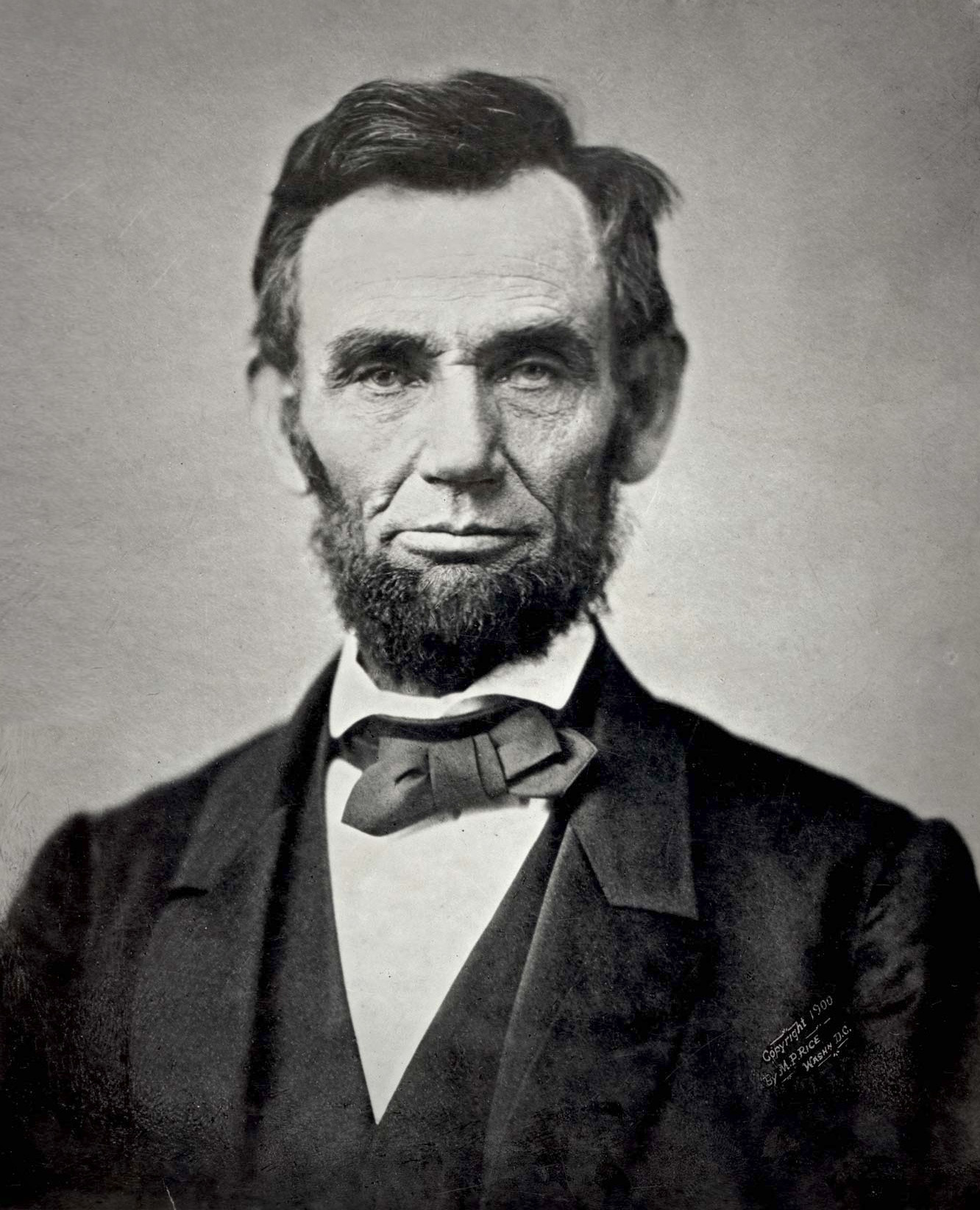
Abraham Lincoln in 1863, the year he issued the Emancipation Proclamation

In 1861 the American Civil War began, with a number of Southern states rebelling against the United States government (known as the Union) led by President Abraham Lincoln. The primary issue was slavery, which was endemic in the South but which Lincoln's Republican Party sought to abolish. In September 1862, Lincoln warned that he would declare free all slaves held in any state still in rebellion at the start of the next year. He accomplished this on January 1, 1863, with the Emancipation Proclamation.

In the years leading up to the war's outbreak, Emerson's home city of Boston was a "hotbed" of abolitionism in the United States. In one incident in 1854, an angry mob protested federal troops as they marched Anthony Burns, a fugitive slave, out of Boston to be returned to bondage in Virginia. Emerson came to identify publicly with the cause of abolitionism following the passage of the Fugitive Slave Act of 1850. By 1851 he was numbered among the prominent "Free Soiler" poets.

== History ==
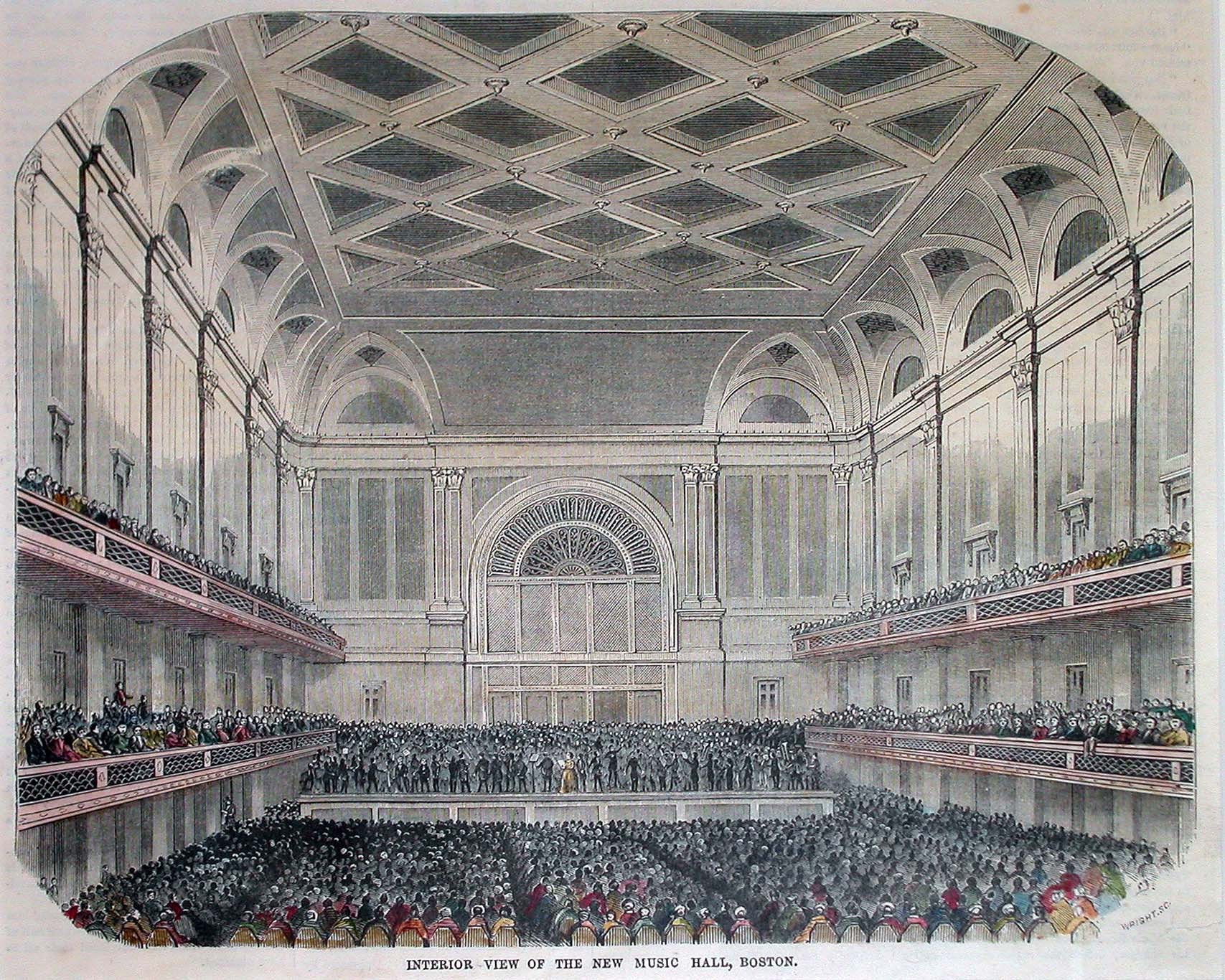
An artist's rendering of Boston Music Hall, where Emerson first read "Boston Hymn"

In December 1862, as Lincoln's deadline approached, John Sullivan Dwight approached Emerson, asking him to compose and read a poem as part of a concert planned for January 1 to celebrate the proclamation. Emerson was initially noncommittal, citing scheduling conflicts, but ultimately relented. His work on the poem was rushed, due to the short time frame and the poet's many other commitments. The bulk of the work of the poem came on December 31, the day before its debut.

On January 1, a crowd of 3,000 gathered at Boston Music Hall for the concert. By Emerson's request his name was not in the program, and his participation in the event was a surprise to the audience. Contemporary accounts indicate that his reading was well received. Emerson read the poem again that day at a private gathering at the home of George Luther Stearns in Medford, Massachusetts. Other guests included Wendell Phillips, Amos Bronson Alcott, Louisa May Alcott, and Julia Ward Howe, who read her "Battle Hymn of the Republic".

"Boston Hymn" was first published in the January 24, 1863, issue of Dwight's eponymous Dwight's Journal of Music. It was reprinted in the following month's edition of The Atlantic. It also appeared in the 1867 Emerson anthology May-Day and Other Pieces. The poem "became famous immediately" and was adopted as an anthem by the 1st South Carolina Volunteers, an all-black regiment of the Union Army.

== Content ==
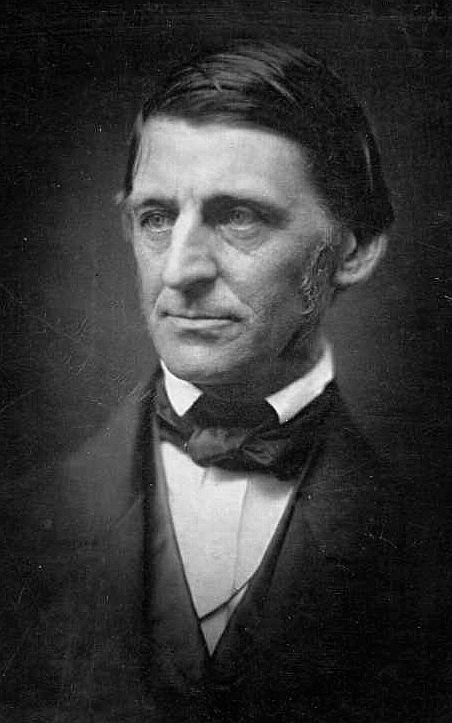
Emerson, ca. 1857

"Boston Hymn" consists of 22 rhyming quatrains. The edition printed in The Atlantic omits a quatrain Emerson accidentally left out of the manuscript he sent to the printer.

The poem recalls the conception of Boston as a "city upon a hill" that originated with Massachusetts Colony's Puritan founders, also called Pilgrims. According to a modern critic, the poem connects this history to the contemporary moment by "imagining wartime Boston as the legitimate inheritor of Puritan militance, severity, iconoclasm, and singleness of purpose, if not necessarily its literal theology." (Indeed, Emerson's early working title was "The Pilgrims".) In this way, the poem places the Emancipation Proclamation within the history of the Puritans' mission in America and a fulfillment of America's sacred destiny. It conceives of a covenant between God and America, parallel to the covenant with Israel, in which adoption of the Puritan ideals of equality and democracy are rewarded with prosperity. The poem is narrated by God, suggesting divine authority behind the Emancipation Proclamation.

"Boston Hymn" has specific earthly political messages, as well. It hails the Emancipation Proclamation as a more successful liberating document than the Declaration of Independence. It rejoins some of Emerson's contemporaries who called for emancipation strictly as a matter of military necessity. In one stanza, the poem calls for reparations to be paid to freed slaves for their labor:

Pay ransom to the owner,
And fill the bag to the brim.
Who is the owner? The slave is the owner,
And ever was. Pay him.

This amounts also to a repudiation of the proposal that slaveowners be compensated for "property" lost in emancipation, a proposal Emerson himself once endorsed.

In composing the poem, Emerson drew on ideas he had developed in his previous works, including essays, speeches, and other poems. He was influenced in particular by the Burns case.

== See also ==
- Concord Hymn
