= Mark Twain at the Territorial Enterprise =

From 1862 to 1865, Samuel Clemens wrote for the leading newspaper of Virginia City, Nevada, Territorial Enterprise. There, his literary skills were first realized and he first used the pen name "Mark Twain."

== Background ==
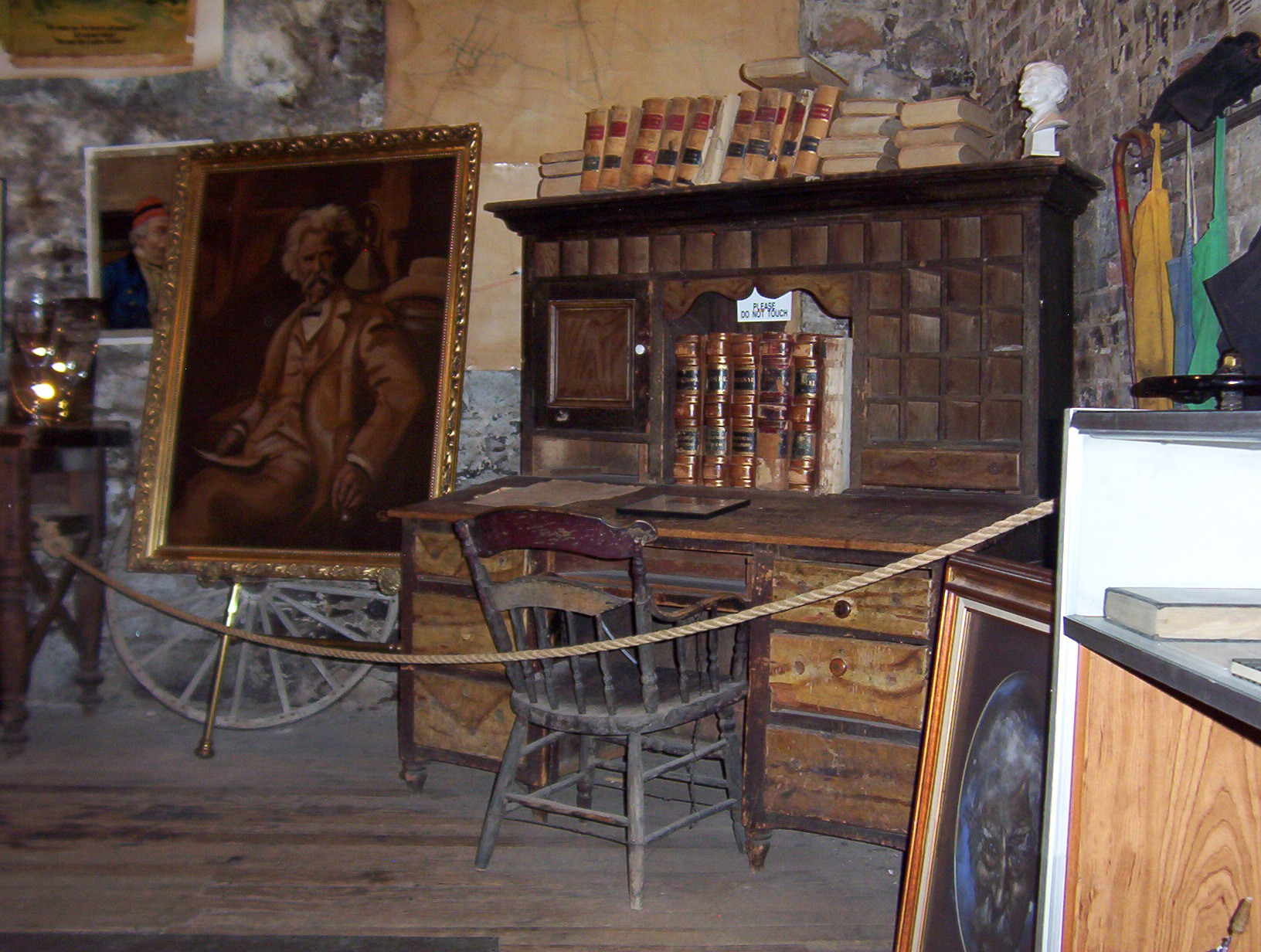
Mark Twain's editor's desk preserved at the Mark Twain Territorial Enterprise Museum, Virginia City, Nevada

Having stumped for Abraham Lincoln's presidential bid in 1860, Orion Clemens was appointed Secretary of the Nevada Territory in March 1861. Although the position carried a significant salary, it did not include any funds to relocate to Nevada. Without the funds to pay for the trip, Orion struck a deal with his brother Samuel whereby Samuel would pay for the move in exchange for a job as Orion's private secretary.

Once in Nevada, the job was unable to maintain Samuel Clemens's interest, and he soon moved on to other things. In February 1862, he began to send occasional letters to the territory's major paper, Virginia City's Territorial Enterprise. By July, he was asking Orion if he could assist him in finding a job as a correspondent. The Enterprise staff, led by its founding editor Joseph T. Goodman, had enjoyed Clemens's letters that he had signed as "Josh", especially one that satirized the oratory of the territory's chief justice. In the fall, he was offered twenty-five dollars a week to become the city editor of the paper, which he accepted.

It was during that period, on February 3, 1863, that Clemens first used his famous pen name in signing a letter complaining about a lavish party that kept him "awake for forty-eight hours" with "yours dreamily, MARK TWAIN". Twain moved to San Francisco in 1864 but in 1865 got a correspondence job with the Territorial Enterprise to help cope with his financial problems. From February 1865 to March 1866, when Twain left for Hawaii, he composed five or six "San Francisco Letters" to the Enterprise. Each letter consisted of about 2,000 words and Twain was paid $100 a month for the stories.

== Rediscovery ==
Much of the Enterprise historical catalog was lost in a fire. After several years of effort, researchers at the University of California at Berkeley announced they had recovered about 110 of Twain's Enterprise columns by looking through the archives of other Western newspapers that often republished his stories. The collection was unveiled in May 2015 and also contained private correspondence between Twain and his brother. In one 1865 letter to Orion, Twain wrote that he was contemplating suicide: "If I do not get out of debt in three months—pistols or poison for one—exit me." Bob Hirst, who heads the project, said that he expects the recovered stories to be put into book form for release in early 2017. The book will contain about 65,000 words, or roughly 25% of Twain's correspondence from 1865–66.

== Writings ==
Clemens began covering "vice, the mines, ghost stories, social functions, and other intrigues (sometimes imaginary) in his local columns" for the Enterprise. By December 1862, he was reporting on the territorial legislature and courts in Carson City. He often got his letters republished in papers throughout the region and near the end of 1863 began contributing to The Golden Era, a San Francisco literary journal.

=== "Petrified Man" hoax ===
One of Clemens's more popular pieces in 1862 was the unsigned "Petrified Man." Clemens claimed that a petrified man who had lived "close about a century ago" had been found "south of Gravelly Ford" and was perfectly "stony" except for his missing left leg "which has evidently been a wooden one during the lifetime of the owner." Clemens described the figure: "the attitude was pensive, the right thumb resting against the side of the nose; the left thumb partially supported the chin, the fore-finger pressing the inner corner of the left eye and drawing it partly open; the right eye was closed, and the fingers of the right hand were spread apart." Clemens declared that it had been taken to a local bureaucrat, named Sewall, who, along with a crowd, both marvels at and does not understand the gesture. Historian Bruce Michelson concludes that by means of the hoax, Twain both ridiculed the local politician Sewall and, with a story about a jeering hunk of stone winking and thumbing its nose at the world, mocked a gullible public, which was too quick to accept a mass of petrification reports. The humorous story was quickly picked up by other newspapers and spread east.

=== Empire City massacre hoax ===
Twain's humor was not always appreciated, such as his October 28, 1863 hoax "A Bloody Massacre near Carson" (alternatively, the "Empire City Massacre Hoax"), purporting to detail the story of a man who loses "an immense amount in the Spring Valley Water Company of San Francisco" who in a deranged fit kills and scalps his wife and nine children. Historian Leland Krauth lists some of the grotesque details that were used by Twain in the piece: "six of the nine children dead on the bedroom floor, battered by a 'blunt instrument,' their brains 'dashed out with a club'; two more collapsed askew in the kitchen, 'bruised and insensible'; and the last dead in the garret, her body 'frightfully mutilated,' the knife with which her 'wounds had been inflicted' still 'sticking in her side.' The mother also lies dead and mutilated: 'scalpless,' her head 'split open'; and her right hand 'almost severed from the wrist'."

While the regular indicators were present that the piece was a joke, it was so bloody that it shocked the Enterprise readership and later caused the paper's trustworthiness to be brought into question. Other newspapers in the region, including the Gold Hill News and the San Francisco Bulletin, had picked up the story and presented it as factual. Twain was stunned that few had picked up that neither a mansion nor a forest existed near Empire City, where the piece claimed to have occurred. Despite Twain's retraction of the piece the next day, his critics held it against him for over a year. Many subscribers to the Enterprise canceled their subscriptions and turned to their rival, the Union. The newspapers that had reprinted it were outraged, with the Bulletin demanding for Twain to be fired. However, Twain's offer to resign from the paper was refused by Goodman, and his reputation continued to grow.

=== Rawhide Ranch ===
In a letter recovered in 2015, "A Scene at Rawhide Ranch", Twain tells the story of two Tuolumne County miners named John W. Gashwiler and Johnny Skae. In the story, the two men are lowered into a shaft they are investigating in a bucket tied to a rope, which is tied to an old horse named Cotton. The horse has a tendency to take breaks for "profound meditation" and unfortunately decides to take one right after the bucket breaks free of the rope, which leaves the men dangling with their lives in jeopardy. "The bucket broke loose and went thundering down to the bottom, apparently 70 or 80 feet, leaving the two adventurers clinging desperately to the rope and glaring in each other's faces", Twain wrote. "Just then, Cotton stopped to meditate." After some time and much shouting by the men, Cotton decides it has nothing better to do and saves the men. They then proceed to buy the mine, horse included.

Hirst describes the story as "quite characteristic" of Twain's later writing. "[Twain] can't possibly have heard the conversation that was going on between Gashwiler and Skae, as they're dangling above the bottom of this mine and worrying about dying. He imagined that—and he creates it, whole cloth, not from documents. BUT … the whole story is factual. These guys are really inspecting the mine. They really, eventually, do buy it … I'm sure Cotton is real. That is almost the epitome of the way Mark Twain will work—for the rest of his literary career. He likes to get a hold of true stories and tell them in his own fashion."

=== Other San Francisco writings ===
After moving to San Francisco, Twain often used his column to mock the San Francisco government and police department. For example, in one piece, he compared the police force to wax figurines and says that they do about the same amount of crime-stopping. "Blackmail, corruption and bribery is the rule, and not the exception, among the municipal body … The correspondent suggests the necessity of hanging half the policemen." In another piece, he wrote about the San Francisco Opera and implied that it put him to sleep.

In one letter, Twain picks a fight with the San Francisco police chief, Martin Burke. He describes Burke as like a dog chasing its own tail to "show off before his mistress." When Burke supporters complained about the piece, Twain wrote another to explain the mistress was that of the dog, not the chief. "Chief Burke don't keep a mistress", he explains. "On second thoughts, I only wish he did … Even if he kept a mistress, I would hardly parade it in the public prints. Nor would I object to his performing any gymnastic miracle … to afford her wholesome amusement."
