= The Prince's Dream =

- Short story by Jean Ingelow
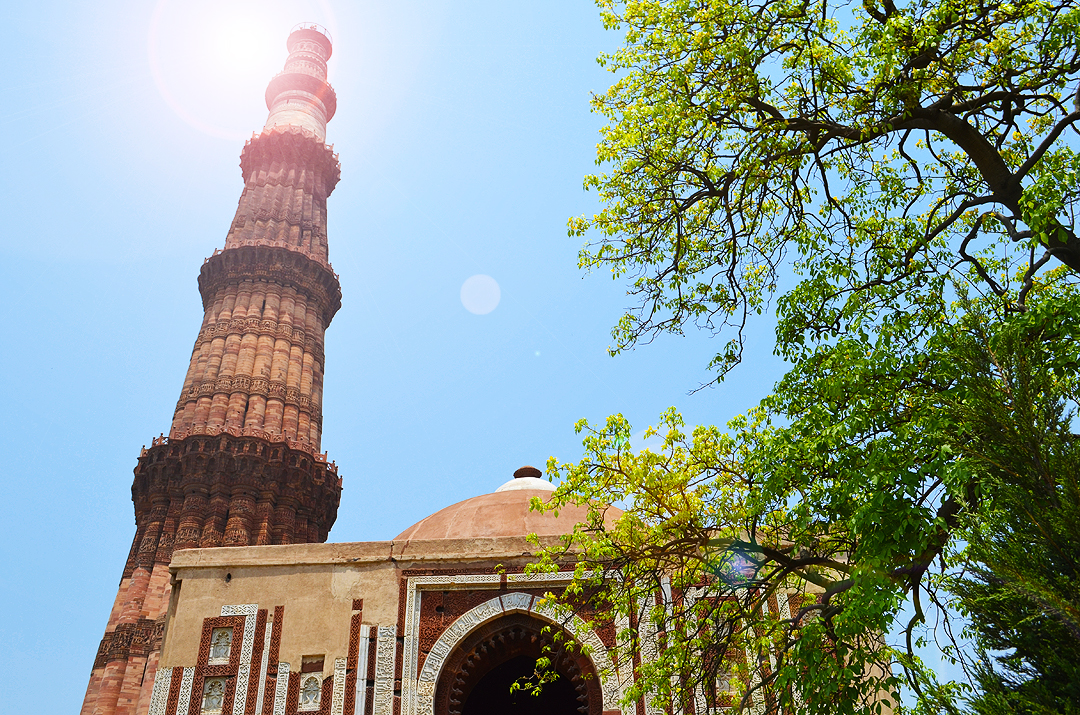
- Qutub Minar, Delhi, India. Note: This is not particularly the tower from the tale.
- Country: The United Kingdom
- Language: English
- Genre(s): Literary fairy tale

Publication
- Published in: "The Wonderbox Tales"
- Publication date: 1863

The Prince's Dream is a fable written by Jean Ingelow as part of The Wonderbox Tales collection. The story is a tale of a prince living in seclusion within a far-off tower filled with many luxuries, in Southern Asia (India). The story focuses on his encounter with an old man, who comes to the prince in a dream and offers a view of what the ‘outside world’ is truly about. This encounter shapes the prince's view of the outside world, as well as his developing views on morality and the importance and reason of life.

== Synopsis ==
A young prince, who is raised from infancy in a large tower, has been brought up in a world of luxuries, decadence, but is also brought up without a sense of the true worth of money and material goods. He is brought up with many slaves, companions and attendants, but has never set foot outside the tower. Everything the Prince knows about the world comes from the stories and tales that his slaves and attendants, who are replaced over and over again, have told him.

The Prince believes that he knows what is going on outside the tower thanks to these stories until one day, a new man arrives at the tower. The newcomer, an old man, begins to discuss what is happening in the 'outside world' and about what the meaning of “gold” is and what having wealth truly means. At first, being exposed to nothing but luxury his whole life, the young Prince focuses on the importance of gold in the world. But he later realizes through a dream that gold and luxuries are not as important as hard work, charity, empathy and ethics. The danger of gold and greed is revealed to the Prince when he realizes the importance of work and charity after seeing the people in his dream torn apart by avarice. Upon waking, the Prince suddenly understands the implications of putting too much importance on material things. Upon realizing this, the old man disappears, leaving the Prince with a humbling perspective about the world around him.

== Author ==
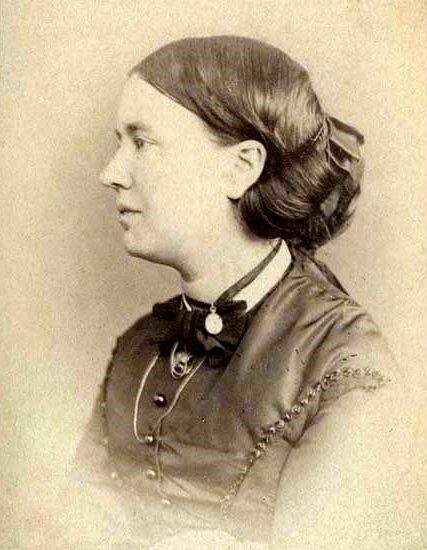
Jean Ingelow by Elliott and Fry

Jean Ingelow (March 17, 1820 and died on July 20, 1897) was an English poet and novelist. Her published works first became recognized in the 1860s and focused mainly on poems and children's literature.
