= Ted Wilkins =

English rugby league footballer

Personal information
- Full name: Edwin J. R. Wilkins
- Born: third ¼ 1936 (age 89–90) Wakefield district, England

Playing information
- Position: Fullback
Club
| Years | Team | Pld | T | G | FG | P |
|---|---|---|---|---|---|---|
| 1955–56 | Wakefield Trinity | 4 | 0 | 1 | 0 | 2 |

Edwin "Ted" J. R. Wilkins (third ¼ 1936) is an English former professional rugby league footballer who played in the 1950s. He played at club level for Wakefield Trinity, as a fullback.

== Background ==
Ted Wilkins' birth was registered in Wakefield district, West Riding of Yorkshire.

== Playing career ==
=== Notable tour matches ===
Ted Wilkins played fullback in Wakefield Trinity's 17-12 victory over Australia in the 1956–57 Kangaroo tour of Great Britain and France match at Belle Vue, Wakefield on Monday 10 December 1956.

=== Club career ===
Ted Wilkins made his début for Wakefield Trinity during April 1955.
