= Lessingham =

Village in Norfolk, England

Coordinates: 52.799°N 1.543°E

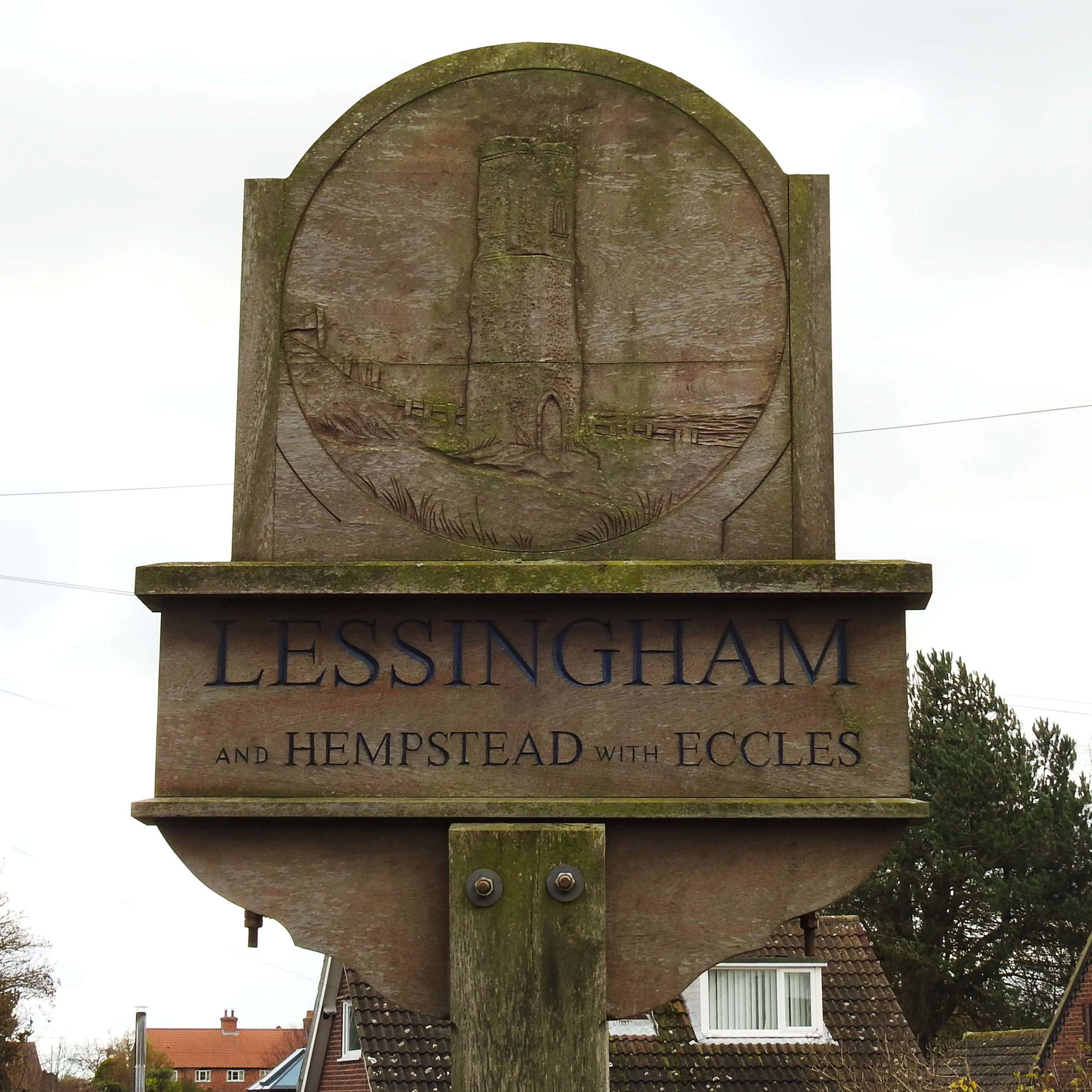
- Lessingham Village Sign

- Location within Norfolk
- Area: 2.88 sq mi (7.5 km^{2})
- Population: 505 (2021 census)
  - Density: 175/sq mi (68/km^{2})
- OS grid reference: TG3928
  - London: 136 miles (219 km)
- Civil parish: Lessingham
- District: North Norfolk
- Shire county: Norfolk
- Region: East
- Country: England
- Sovereign state: United Kingdom
- Post town: NORWICH
- Postcode district: NR12
- Dialling code: 01692
- UK Parliament: North Norfolk

Lessingham is a village and a civil parish in the English county of Norfolk. The civil parish also includes the village of Eccles on Sea and the hamlet of Hempstead.

Lessingham is located 16.3 miles (26.2 km) south-east of Cromer and 17.6 miles (28.3 km) north-east of Norwich.

== History ==
Lessingham's name is of Anglo-Saxon origin and derives from the Old English for the homestead of Leofsige's people.

In the Domesday Book, Lessingham is listed as a settlement of 45 households in the hundred of Happing. In 1086, the village was part of the East Anglian estates of King William I.

During the Second World War, several structures were built in Lessingham to defend against a possible German invasion, including pillboxes, mortar emplacements and anti-tank obstacles.

== Geography ==
According to the 2021 census, Lessingham has a population of 505 people which shows a decrease from the 566 people recorded in the 2011 census.

== All Saints' Church ==
Lessingham's parish church dates from the Thirteenth Century. All Saints' is located on Star Hill and has been Grade II listed since 1955. The church is no longer open for Sunday service.

All Saints' was re-built and restored by Herbert John Green in the 1890s and a set of stained-glass windows designed by James Powell and Sons depicting Saint Andrew, Saint George and King Richard I.

== Governance ==
Lessingham is part of the electoral ward of Happisburgh for local elections and is part of the district of North Norfolk.

The village's national constituency is North Norfolk, which has been represented by the Liberal Democrat Steff Aquarone MP since 2024.
